= Christian Skredsvig =

Norwegian painter and writer (1854–1924)

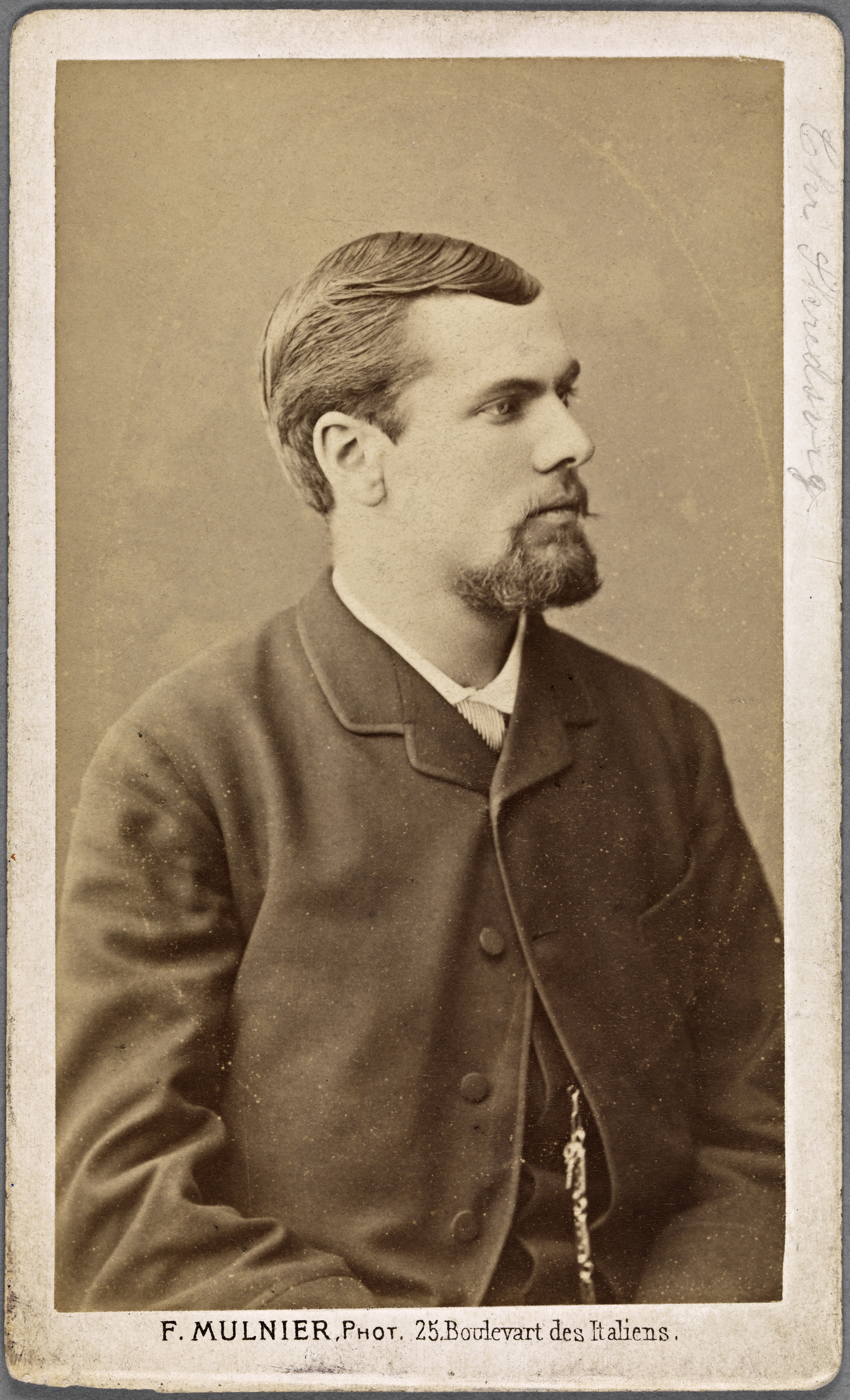
- Christian Skredsvig
- Born: 2 March 1854; Modum, Buskerud, Norway
- Died: 19 January 1924 (aged 69); Eggedal, Buskerud, Norway
- Education: Johan Fredrik Eckersberg; Julius Middelthun; Vilhelm Kyhn; Léon Bonnat
- Known for: Painting
- Notable work: Seljefløiten (1889); Une ferme à Venoix (1881)
- Movement: neo-romantic

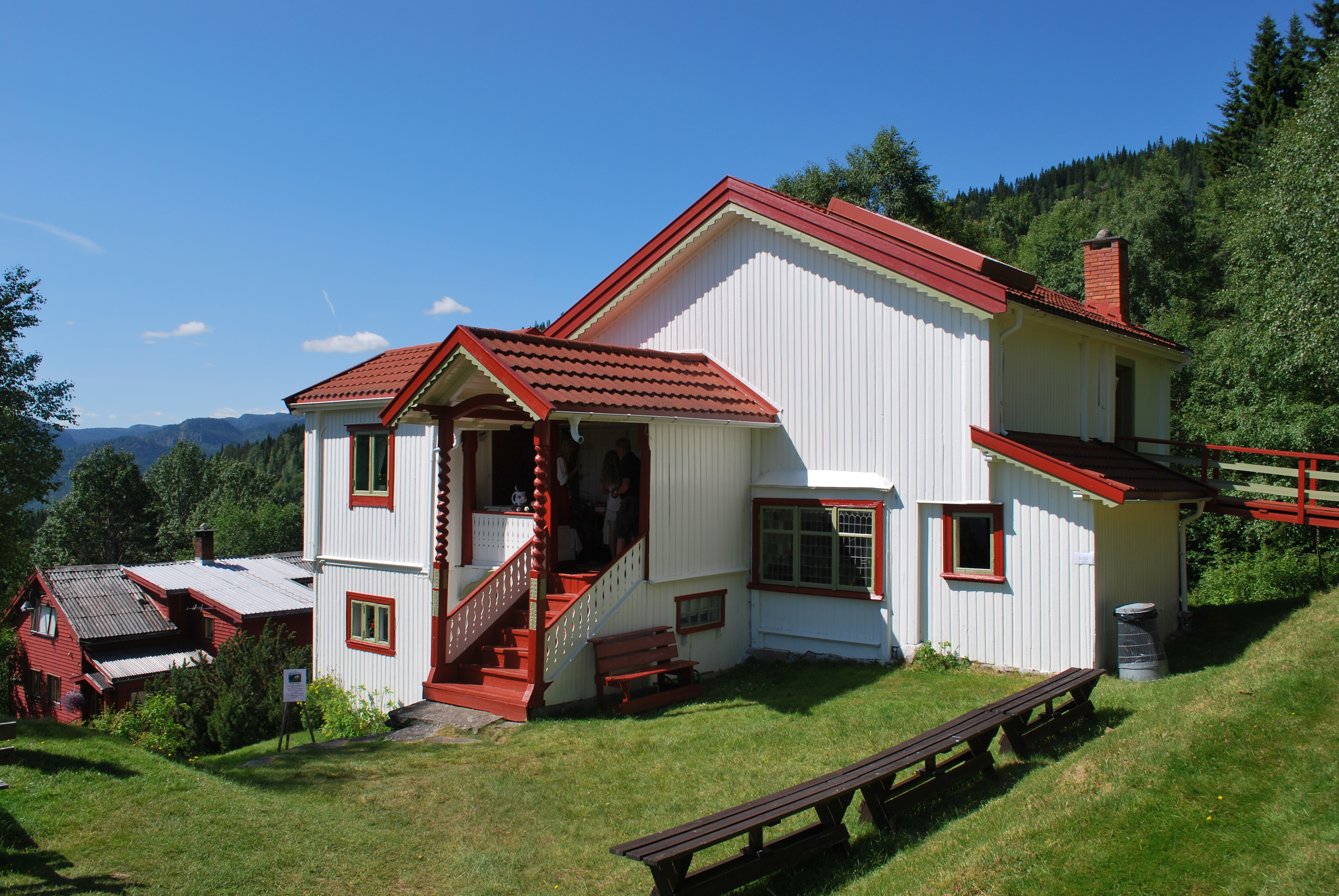
Hagen in Eggedal

Christian Skredsvig (12 March 1854 – 19 January 1924) was a Norwegian painter and writer. He employed an artistic style reflecting naturalism. He is especially well known for his picturesque and lyrical depictions of the landscape.

== Biography ==
Christian Erichsen Skredsvig was born and grew up on the Skredsvig farm in the parish of Modum in Buskerud, Norway.

When he was 15 years old he became a pupil at the drawing and paint school of Johan Fredrik Eckersberg in Christiania (now Oslo). After Eckersberg's death in 1870 he studied with Julius Middelthun at Norwegian National Academy of Craft and Art Industry (Den kgl. Tegneskole) in Kristiania (now Oslo). He followed with four years of apprenticeship (1870–1874) in Copenhagen under the supervision of landscape painter Vilhelm Kyhn at the Royal Danish Academy of Fine Arts.

Skredsvig was awarded the Schäffer's legacy in 1872 and received a Government sponsored travel allowance during 1876, 1877 and 1880. He settled in 1875 at Munich where he developed lifelong friendships with several the Norwegian artists. He next relocated to Paris where for a time he was a student of Léon Bonnat. He exhibited at the Exposition Universelle at Paris in 1878. In 1881, as the only Norwegian artist, he won the gold medal for his painting Une ferme à Venoix (1881) at the Salon of the Académie des Beaux-Arts in Paris.

After several years in Paris he moved back to Norway in 1886 and settled at the Fleskum farm in Bærum. His new home became a gathering place for painters, poets and musicians. Eilif Peterssen, Kitty Kielland, Harriet Backer and Erik Werenskiold all made trips to the farm. Skredsvig's famous neo-romantic painting Seljefløiten (1889) was painted by the Lake Dælivannet in Bærum. He also conducted study trips, to Corsica in 1888 and to southern France in 1891.

In 1894, he moved to Eggedal in Sigdal municipality where he built his home Hagan. In the natural landscape of Eggedal, Skredsvig found inspiration and motives to paint. The most famous from this period are perhaps Idyll (1888) and Jupsjøen (1904). In 1896 Skredsvig's good friend and fellow student from the years in Munich, the painter Theodor Kittelsen, also settled in Sigdal, shortly after having visited Skredsvig in his new home.

Skredsvig also became an author. His written works include his autobiography Dage og Nætter blandt Kunstnere (1908) and novels Møllerens Søn (1912) and Evens hjemkomst (1916).

== Hagan in Eggedal ==
Hagan lies high up in Eggedal with a view over the Lake Solevann and the mountain Andersnatten. Skredsvig's former home has been a museum since 1970. The furnishings and artifacts are preserved as they were when Skredsvig lived there. His own work and paintings by his friends still hang on the walls, all together about 150 originals pieces of art. The former residence still belongs to members of the Skredsvig family. The municipality of Sigdal is responsible for maintenance and management of the museum. Hagan is operated in associated with Buskerud Museet.

== Personal life ==
In 1882, he was married to Maggie Plahte (1863–1955), a daughter of Frithjof M. Plahte (1836–1899) who was a merchant and patron of the arts. They separated and were divorced in 1894. In 1898, Skredsvig married Beret Berg (1877–1969) with whom he had four children. In 1908, Skredsvig was appointed a Knight 1st Class in the Order of St. Olav. Skredsvig lived at Hagan in Eggedal until his death in 1924.

== Public displays of art ==
- The Tarn (1879) National Gallery, Oslo
- Ferme à Venoix (1881) Musée de Caen, France
- Oktobermorgen ved Grez (1881–82) National Gallery, Oslo
- Sankthansaften (1886) National Gallery of Denmark, Copenhagen
- Villa Baciocchi (1888) Musée de Corte, Corsica
- Menneskens Søn (1891) National Gallery, Oslo
- Jørgen Moe på fisketur (ca. 1898) National Gallery, Oslo

== Select written work ==
- Dage og Nætter blandt Kunstnere, 1908
- Møllerens Søn, 1912
- Glæas Juleaften, 1913
- Evens Hjemkomst, 1916
- Det gamle skilderi, 1921

== Gallery ==
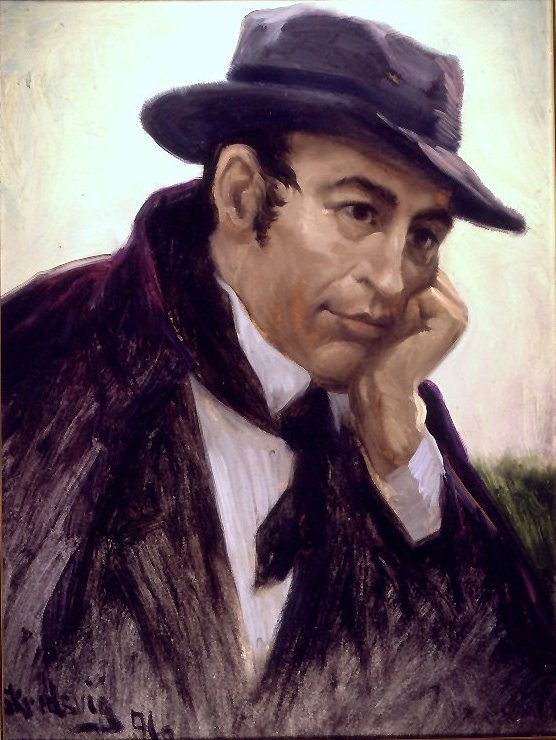
Jørgen Moe (1896)

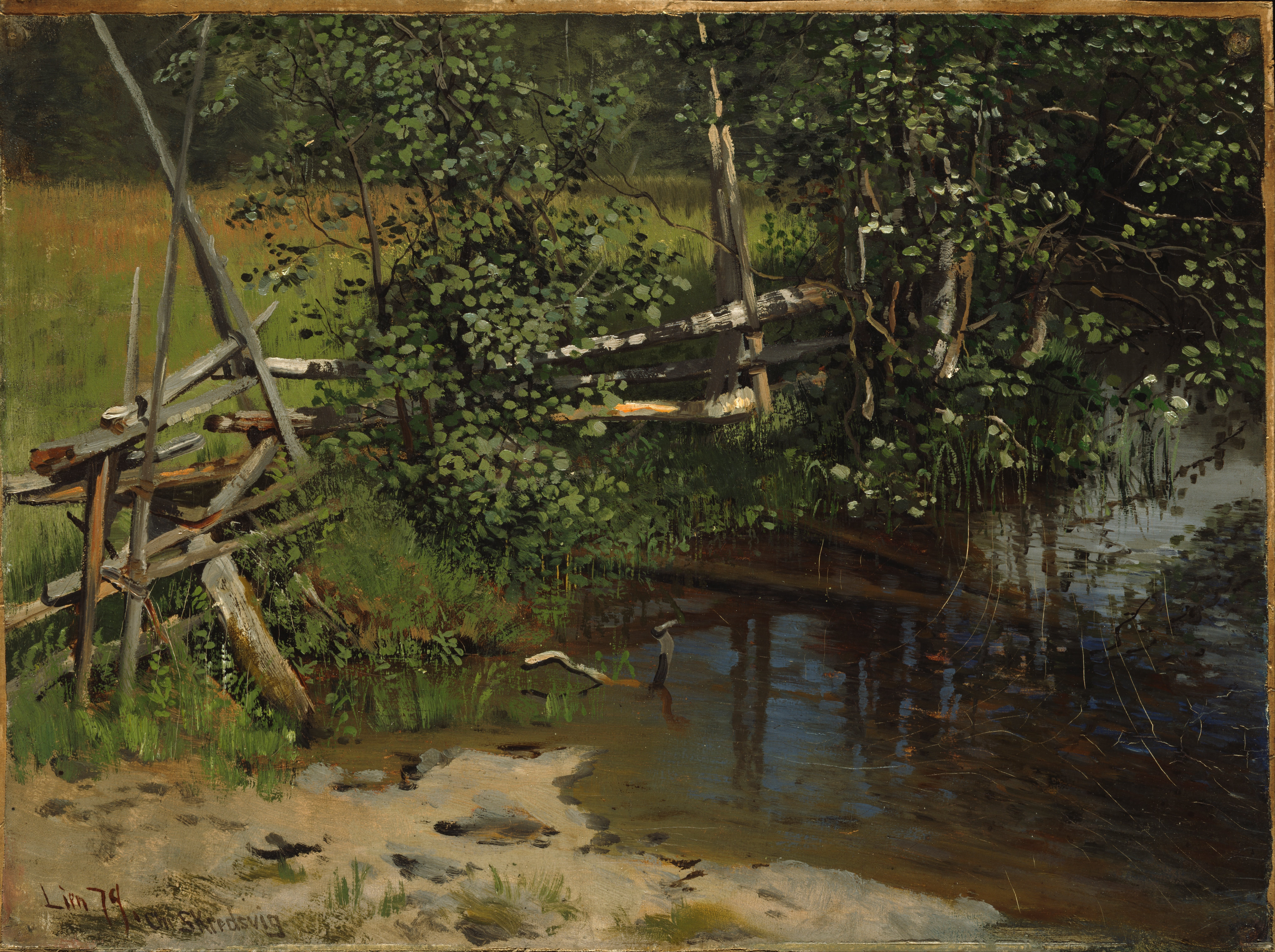
The Tarn (1879)

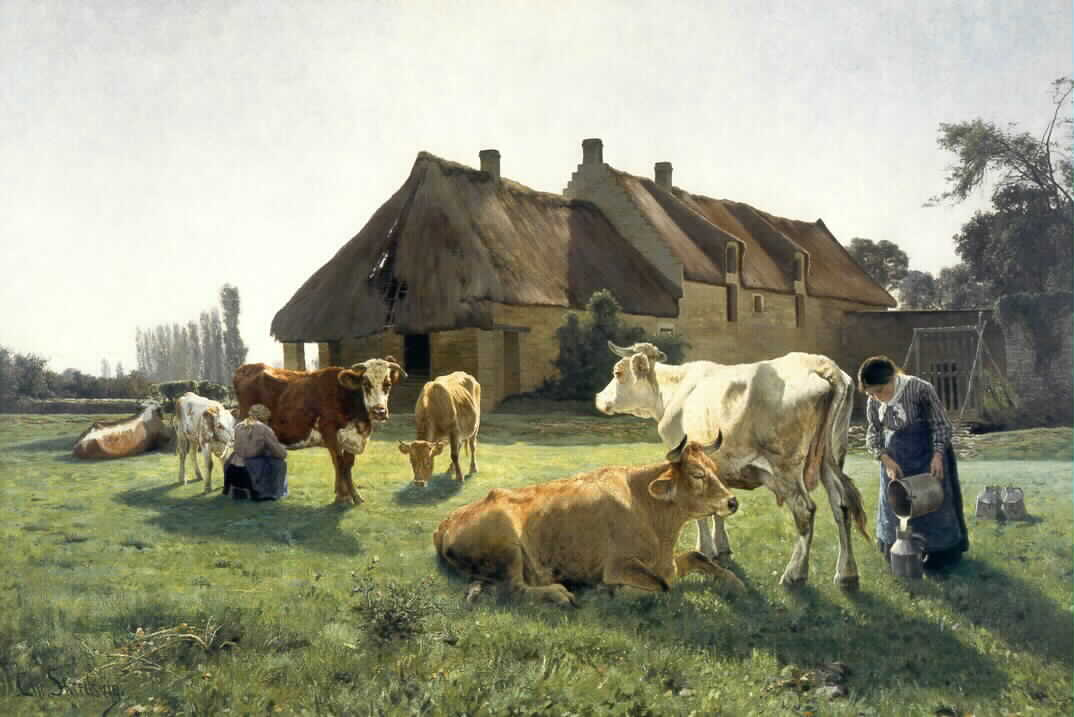
Une ferme à Venoix (1881)

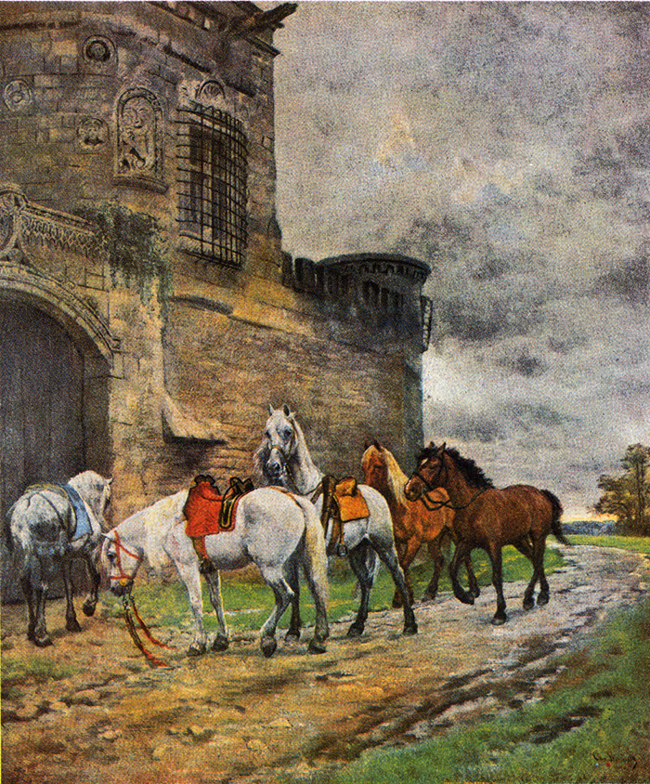
Ballade (1881)

== Other Sources ==
- Thomsen, Ingrid Reed (1995) Chr. Skredsvig (Oslo: Grøndahl Dreyer) ISBN 9788252527926
- Sørensen, Einar: Kjersti Sissener Munthe; Anne Vira Figenschou (2009) Christian Skredsvig. Virkelighet og fortelling (Oslo: Labyrinth Press) ISBN 9788273930873
