= Andersnatten =

Mountain in Norway

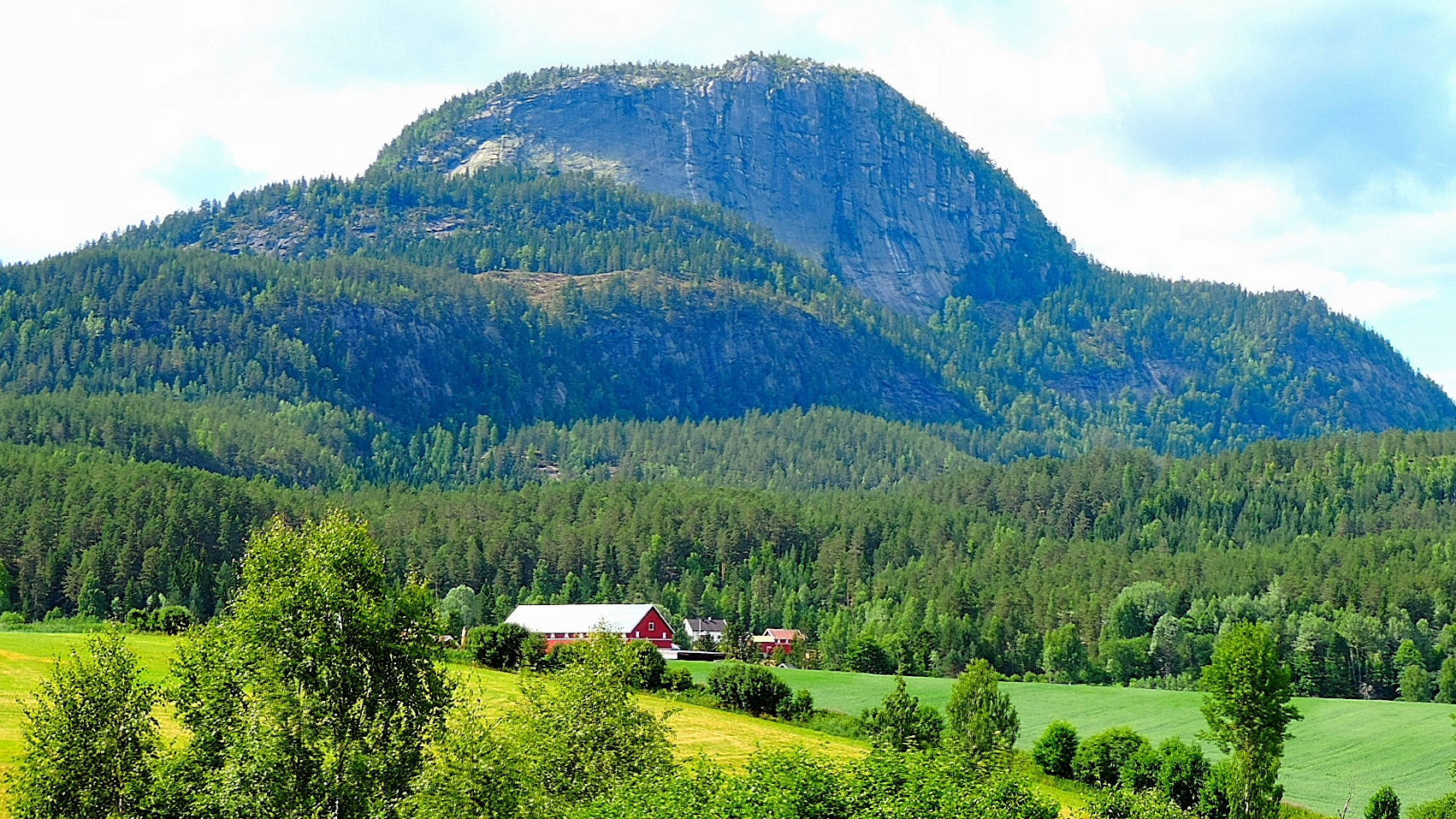
- Andersnatten

Highest point
- Elevation: 733 m (2,405 ft)
- Coordinates: 60°7′1.38″N 9°25′9.65″E

Geography
- Location: Sigdal, Buskerud, Norway
- Topo map: 1715 III Eggedal

Andersnatten is a mountain located at Eggedal in the municipality of Sigdal in Buskerud, Norway.

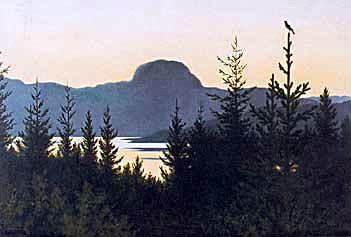
Andersnatten by Theodor Kittelsen (1857-1914)

Andersnatten is a distinctive, round-topped mountain that rises out of the valley floor. Norwegian artists Theodor Kittelsen and Christian Skredsvig both made paintings of the mountain.

Andersnatten has a height of 733 meters above sea level. The southeast wall is popular among climbers, both summer and winter. The first route was established in 1942 by mathematician and mountaineer Einar Hoff Hansen (1923-1944) together with businessman, mountaineer and resistance fighter, Egmont Victor Boeck Nørregaard (1917-2014).
