= Sigdal =

Sigdal Municipality Sigdal kommune
- Municipality
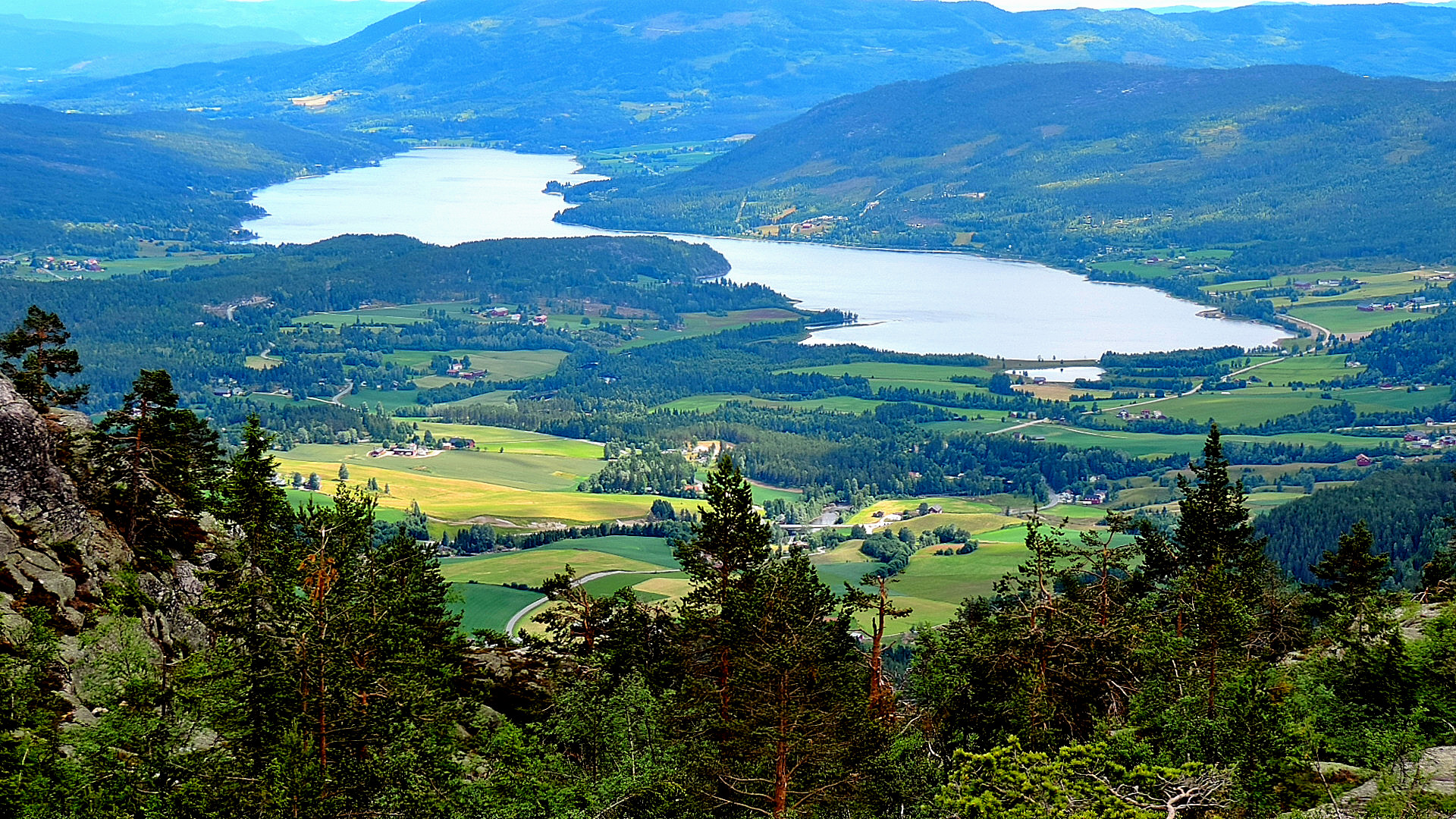

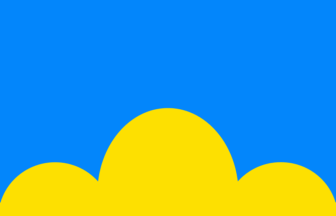
- Flag Coat of arms

- Buskerud within Norway

- Sigdal within Buskerud
- Coordinates: 60°3′9″N 9°36′4″E
- Country: Norway
- County: Buskerud
- District: Ringerike
- Administrative centre: Prestfoss

Government
  - Mayor (2015): Anne Kristine (Tine) Norman (Sp)

Area
  - Total: 842 km^{2} (325 sq mi)
  - Land: 811 km^{2} (313 sq mi)
  - Rank: #130 in Norway

Population (2004)
  - Total: 3,530
  - Rank: #244 in Norway
  - Density: 4/km^{2} (10/sq mi)
  - Change (10 years): ▼ −3.9%
- Demonym: Sigdøl or Sigdøling

Official language
  - Norwegian form: Bokmål
- Time zone: UTC+01:00 (CET)
  - Summer (DST): UTC+02:00 (CEST)
- ISO 3166 code: NO-3332
- Website: Official website

Sigdal is a municipality in Buskerud County, Norway. The administrative centre of the municipality is the village of Prestfoss.

The municipality of Sigdal was established on 1 January 1838 (see formannskapsdistrikt). The area of Krødsherad was separated from Sigdal on 1 January 1901. The municipality has common borders with the municipalities of Flå, Krødsherad, Modum, Øvre Eiker, Flesberg, Rollag, and Nore og Uvdal.

== Name ==
The Old Norse form of the name was Sigmardalr or Sigmudalr. The first element is the genitive case of a river name Sigm(a) (now called the Simoa) and the last element is dalr which means "valley" or "dale". The Simoa river runs through Sigdal, flowing in a south-easterly course until it flows into Drammenselva at Åmot in Modum Municipality. The meaning of the river name is unknown, but is maybe derived from síga which means to "ooze" or "slide".

Number of minorities (1st and 2nd generation) in Sigdal by country of origin in 2017
Ancestry	Number
Poland	83
Syria	50
Lithuania	47
Germany	22
Latvia	17

== Coat-of-arms ==
The coat-of-arms is from modern times. They were granted on 18 November 1983. The arms show a heraldic image of the mountain that dominates the view around the village, the Andersnatten. The profile of the mountain is yellow with a blue-colored sky above.

== Geography and population ==
Most of the citizens live in the village of Eggedal or the administrative centre of Prestfoss. Sigdal is densely populated, dominated by mountains and valleys.

About 72% of the area is covered with forest, 20% is mountain areas, and 4% of the area is cultivated. Agriculture, forestry, and the kitchen-producing enterprise of Sigdal Kjøkken are still important industries.

== Climate ==
Sigdal has a humid continental (Dfb), near subarctic climate (Dfc), Dsb, and Dsc (the dry-summer versions, respectively) at once. The average summer high is 69 F, and the average winter low is 20 F. Snowfall in winter is fairly reliable, at 68 days per year on average, and rainfall peaks in summer and early fall. The highest and lowest temperatures ever recorded in Sigdal are 93 F (34 C) in July and-11 F (-24 C) in February, respectively.

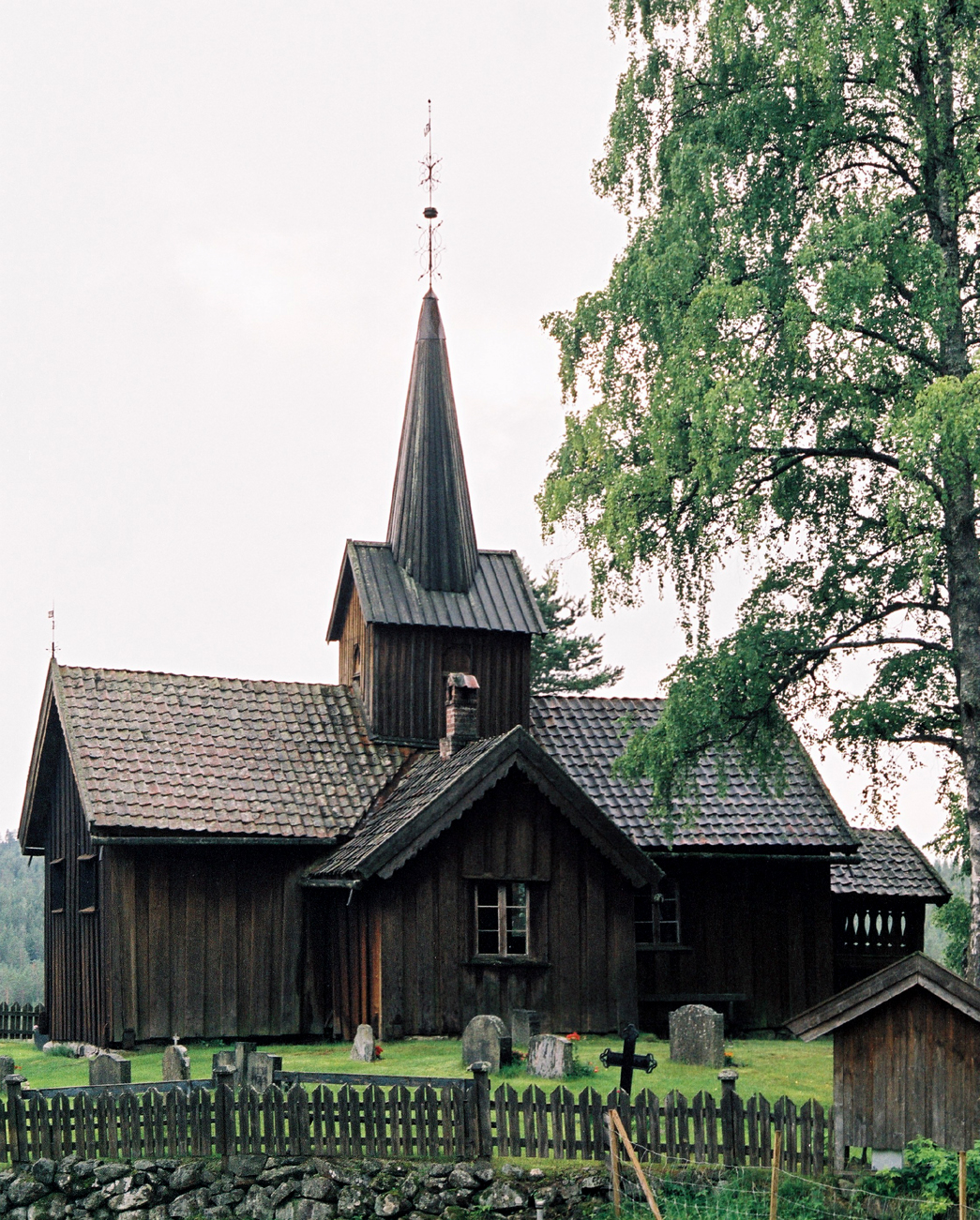
Vatnås Church

== Local attractions ==
- Folk Music Center (Folkemusikksenteret) is a cultural heritage museum offering a good image of the building style and traditions of the district. The Folk Music Center is principally responsible for collecting, storing and promoting local folk music and dance.
- Sigdal-Eggedal Museum is a regional museum for Krødsherad, Modum and Sigdal. This museum dedicated to the region's culture and history is arranged particularly authentically.
- Vatnås Church (Vatnås kirke) is a historic church dating from 1660.
- Lauvlia is the former home of Theodor Kittelsen, one of the most popular artists in Norway, who settled near Prestfoss during 1899. Today Lauvlia is a private museum featuring an exhibition of Kittelsen’s original work
- Andersnatten is a well-known mountain and landmark. The mountain has inspired painters visiting or living in Sigdal, notably Theodor Kittelsen and Christian Skredsvig. It is recognized by mountain climbers as a tough challenge.

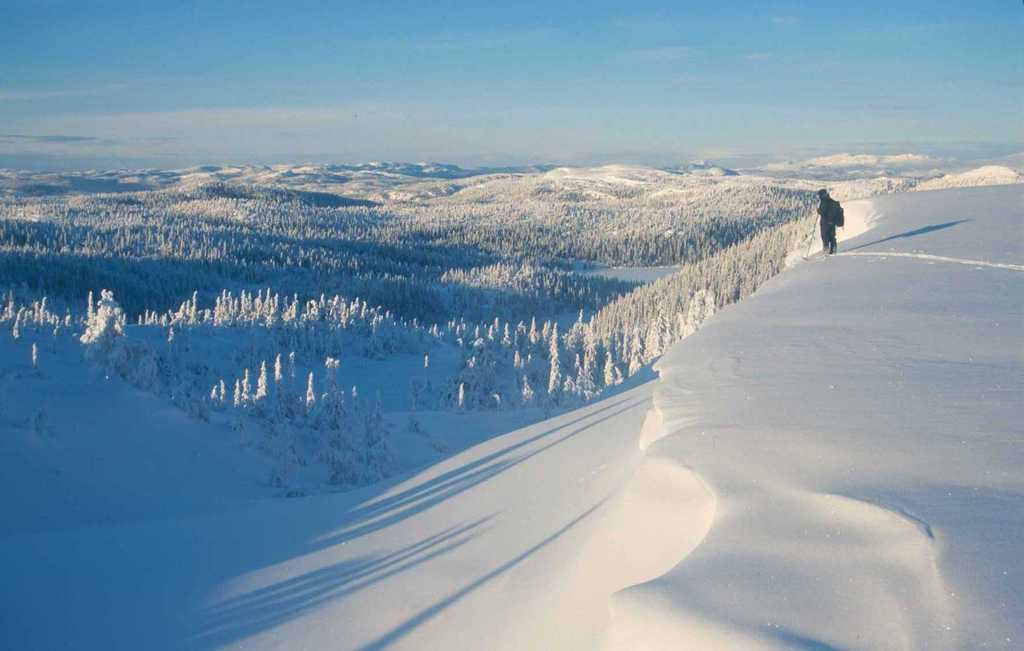
Trillemarka nature reserve

== Protected areas in Sigdal Municipality ==
- Heimseteråsen nature reserve, established on 13 December 2002, 2,515 acres
- Solevatn nature reserve, established 20 June 1986, 538 acres
- Trillemarka nature reserve, established on 13 December 2002, 43,285 acres

== Notable residents ==
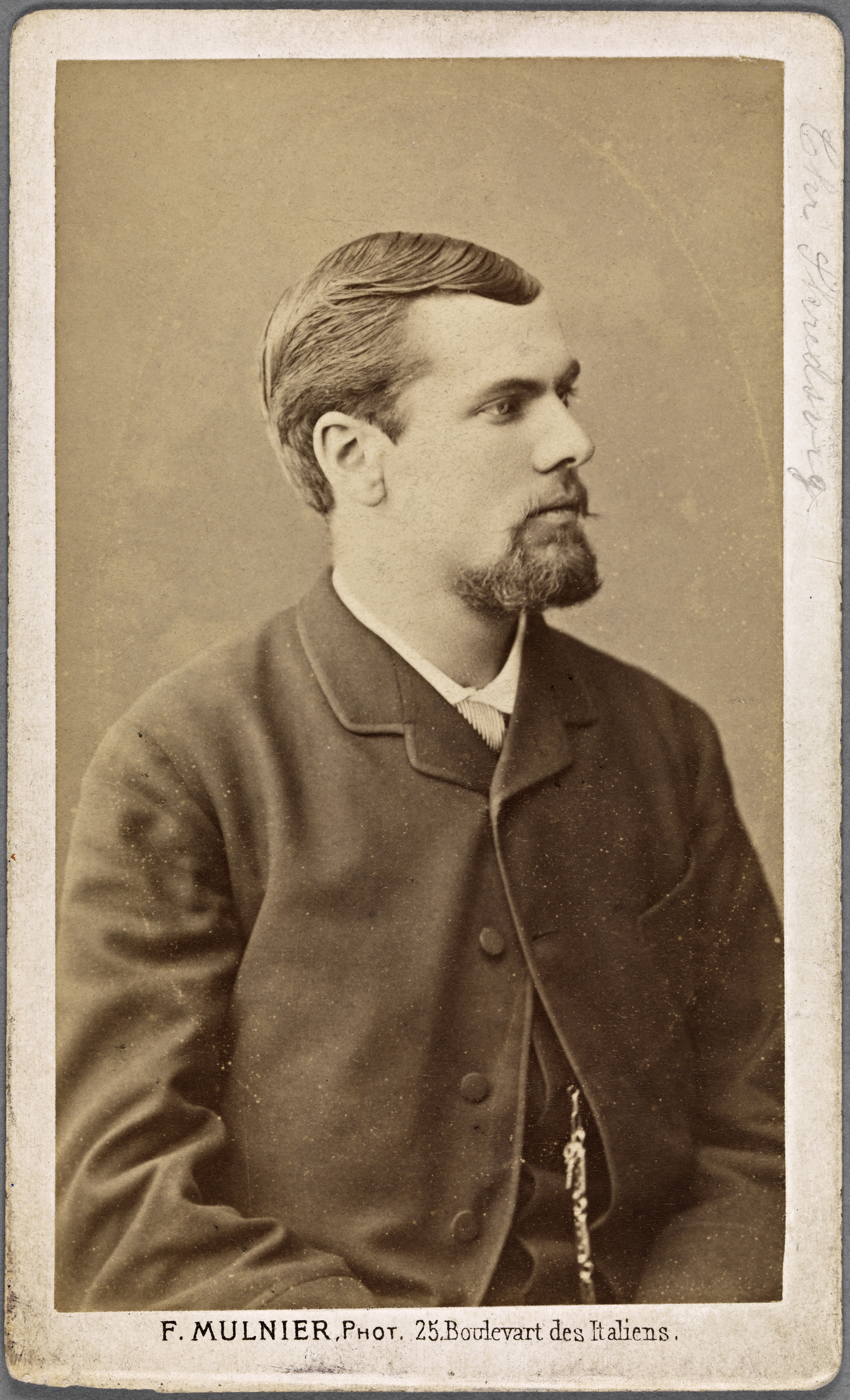
Christian Skredsvig

- Christian Skredsvig (1854 - 1924) Norwegian artist and painter
- Theodor Kittelsen (1857 - 1914) Norwegian artist and painter
- Erik Ramstad (1860 - 1951) Norwegian-American founder of Minot, North Dakota
- Eileif Kolsrud (1873 – 1953) a Norwegian educator and politician, Mayor of Kristiansund
- Gulbrand Hagen (1864 - 1919) Norwegian-American newspaper editor and writer
- Olaf Solumsmoen (1896 - 1972) a Norwegian newspaper editor and politician
- Olaf Knudson (1915 – 1996) politician, deputy mayor of Sigdal in the 1950s
- Erling Kroken (1928-2007) a Norwegian ski jumper
- Dag Aabye (born 1941) an endurance runner in British Columbia, "Father of Freeride Skiing"
- Anne-Lise Berntsen (1943-2012) a Norwegian soprano
- Grete Kummen (born 1952) a cross-country skier, competed at the 1976 Winter Olympics
- Josefine Frida Pettersen (born 1996) actress, played Noora Amalie Sætre in NRK drama series Skam

== Sister cities ==
The following cities are twinned with Sigdal:

- Äänekoski, Central Finland, Finland
- Hveragerði, Iceland
- Örnsköldsvik, Västernorrland County, Sweden

== Gallery ==
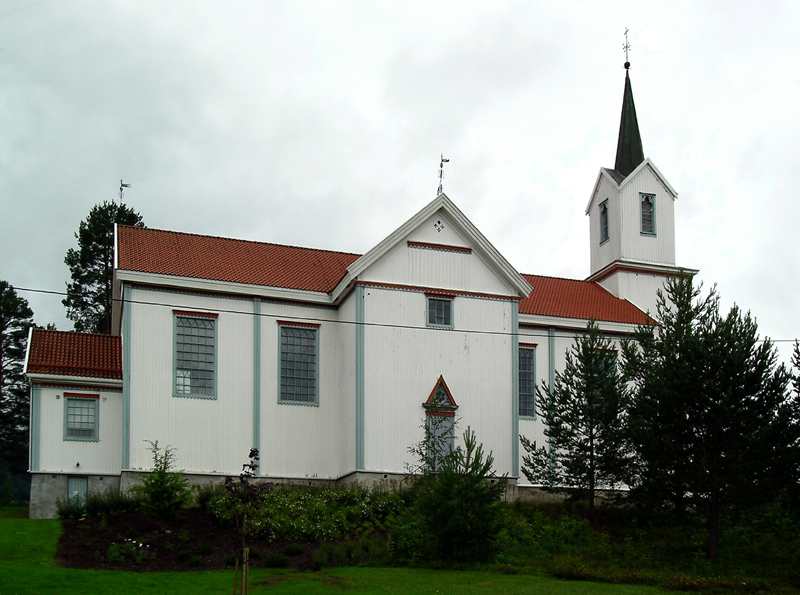
Holmen Church

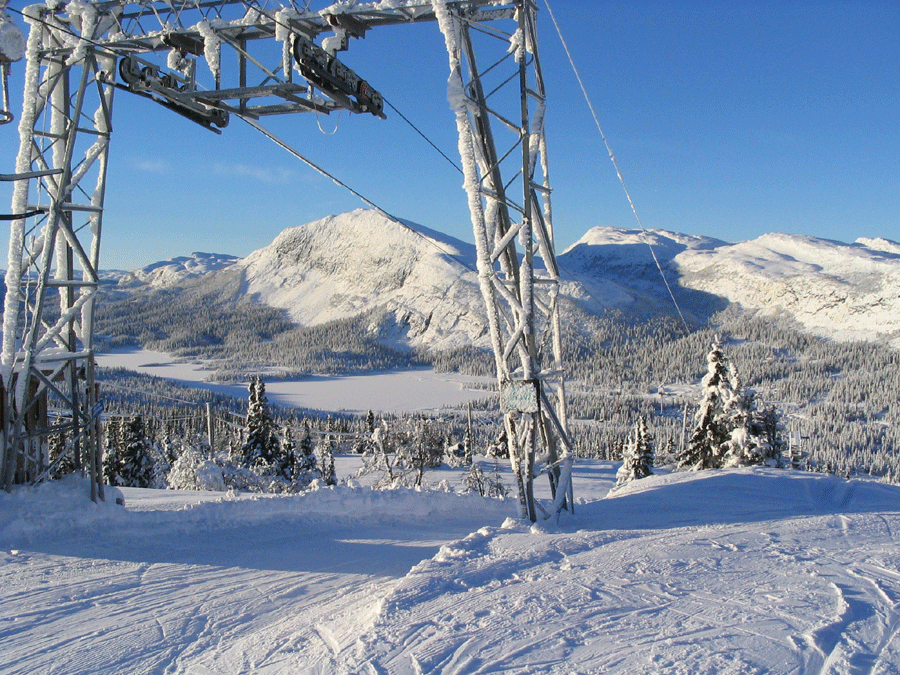
Haglebunatten

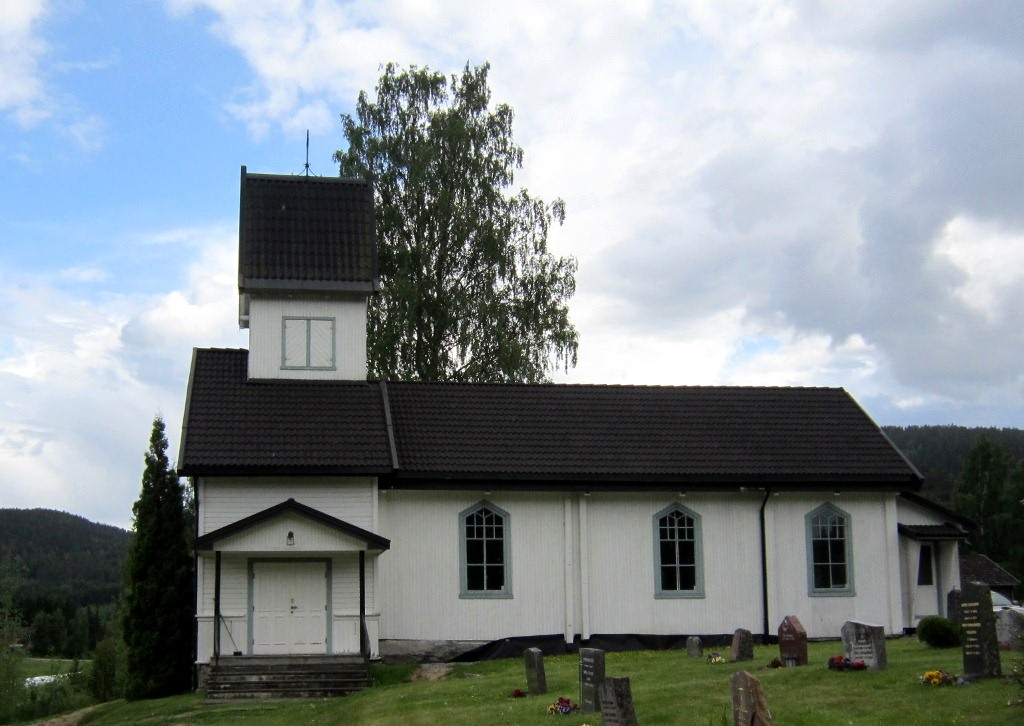
Solumsmoen Chapel

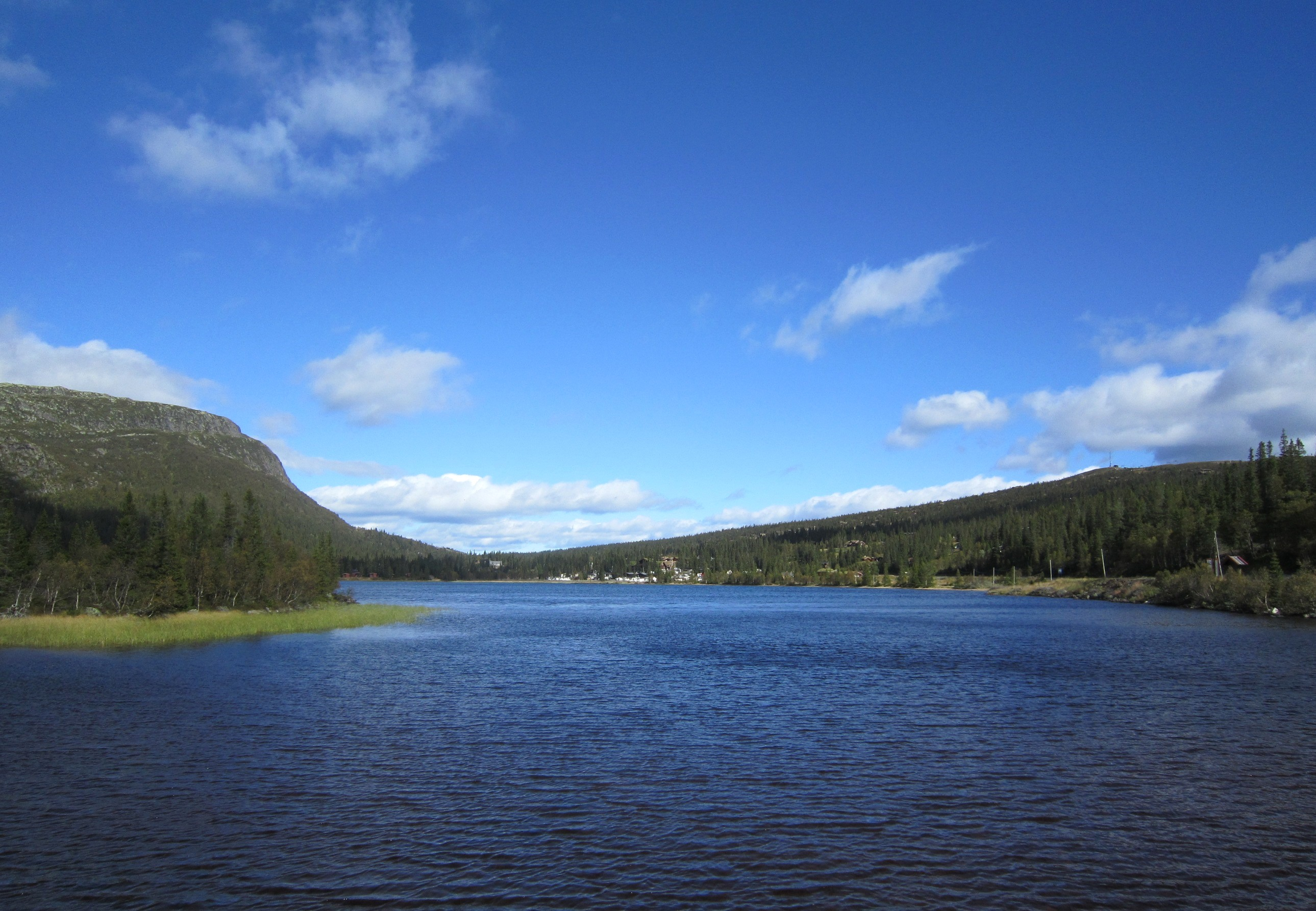
Haglebuvatna

== See also ==
- Sigdal House

== Other sources ==
- Mørch, Andreas & Thormod Skatvedt Sigdal og Eggedal (Sigdal og Eggedal, 1914)
- Mørch, Andreas Frå gamle dagar. Folkeminne frå Sigdal og Eggedal (Norsk Folkeminnelag: 1932)
