= Dag Aabye =

Norwegian-Canadian endurance runner (born 1941)

Personal information
- Nationality: Norwegian
- Citizenship: Norwegian
- Born: May 15, 1941 (age 85) Sigdal, Reichskommissariat Norwegen
- Home town: Sigdal, Norway
- Occupation: Logger

Dag Aabye (born 1941) is an endurance runner known for competing in the 125-kilometer Canadian Death Race, held yearly in August in Grande Cache, Alberta. The race is extremely grueling, with over 17,000 feet of climbing. He is also known for his reclusive lifestyle, as he lives in a renovated bus not far from Silverstar Road in British Columbia, Canada. In 2018, filmmakers Justin Pelletier and Adam Maruniak released a documentary on him entitled Never Die Easy: The Dag Aabye Story. A book-length profile of Aabye by Brett Poppelwell, "Outsider," was published in 2023.

== Early life ==
Dag was born in 1941 in Nazi-occupied Norway, then lived in Argentina before moving to British Columbia.

In the 1960s, Aabye was a ski instructor in Britain and worked as a movie stuntman, including working as an extra in the 1964 James Bond film Goldfinger. He soon after moved to the Whistler Mountain area of Canada where he worked as a ski instructor and became known for his first ski descents of the mountain, sometimes 20 to 30 years before anyone else. He was also known for stunts, skiing off man-made structures and building a ski jump for backflips, and appearing in a number of ski movies by filmmaker Jim Rice. Pelletier and Maruniak assert that "Dag is widely regarded as the founding father of freeskiing." He has been described as "the Father of Free Ride" and "The Last Ski Bum".

== Running career ==
Aabye began running marathons in his early thirties, running ten more by age 50. He took up competitive cross-country skiing, placing fourth in his age group at the 2002 Masters World cup race in Quebec at age 61.

Aabye ran his first Death Race when he was 62 years old, the oldest in that race. Brett Popplewell, author of a 2023 biography, calls Aabye "the world's oldest ultramarathon runner." Like other ultramarathons, the Canadian Death Race is a challenge for even experienced runners, with some needing to be rescued from hypothermia or treated for exhaustion. Racers are known to experience vomiting, loss of vision due to corneal swelling, and hallucinations. Aabye completed his first Death Race in 2003 in 20 hours, 58 minutes, and 16 seconds, but his fastest time was his third attempt in 2005, at 20:56:22. He last finished a Death Race within the 24-hour cutoff in 2009. He was consistently the oldest competitor in the Death Race, and has completed it a record-setting seven times. He continued participating in the Death Race every year; though he failed to finish the full 125-kilometre 24-hour race in those later years, he continued to complete the starting segment, the 49-kilometre (30 mi) Near Death Marathon, which has a cutoff of 9.5 hours. His final Death Race attempt was in 2016, when he was 75.

Aabye cites centenarian marathoner Fauja Singh as an inspiration. Aabye describes running as a way to push his limitations and mortality; though he has slowed with age, he has attempted to maintain his total yearly running distance, about 8,000 kilometres (5,000 mi), by spending longer doing so, stating that "If it's difficult, I'll do it right away. If it's impossible, it will take a little longer." in a paraphrase of his childhood hero, Fridtjof Nansen.

== Personal life ==
Aabye is famously reclusive, living in a school bus that was given to him, on his friends property not far from Silverstar Road, in Vernon BC, it is well known by locals where he can be located. Vernon, British Columbia. Filmmakers Justin Pelletier and Adam Maruniak spent weeks in 2018 attempting to contact Aabye before he called them from a payphone. Journalist Charlotte Helston spent months. Aabye eschews most modern technology, living without electricity, running water, cell phone service, or an Internet connection. He collects water from and washes his clothes in a creek, cooking meals over a campfire. He returns by public transit and running to Vernon several times every week to fill a backpack with supplies, including coffee, potatoes, and eggs.

A 2023 profile described Aabye spending the winters in his converted school bus and summers in a mountainside campsite in the forest. A portable garden shed, which he carried to the site in pieces, serves as the sleeping shelter in his campsite, which is located halfway up a mountain along a secret trail roughly an hour's hike from the nearest highway. In 2017 he was described planning to eventually stay at the mountain campsite year-round in order to train on the trails he built nearby without danger from car traffic.

No longer a ski instructor, Aabye lives on a small pension. A friend describes him as unconcerned with money beyond food and some beer. Rising at 4:30 every morning, he spends his time running, chopping firewood, clearing trails, and reading. He trains every day. He lives simple.

Aabye was married once; he has four children.
