= Dælivannet =

Lake in Bærum, Norway

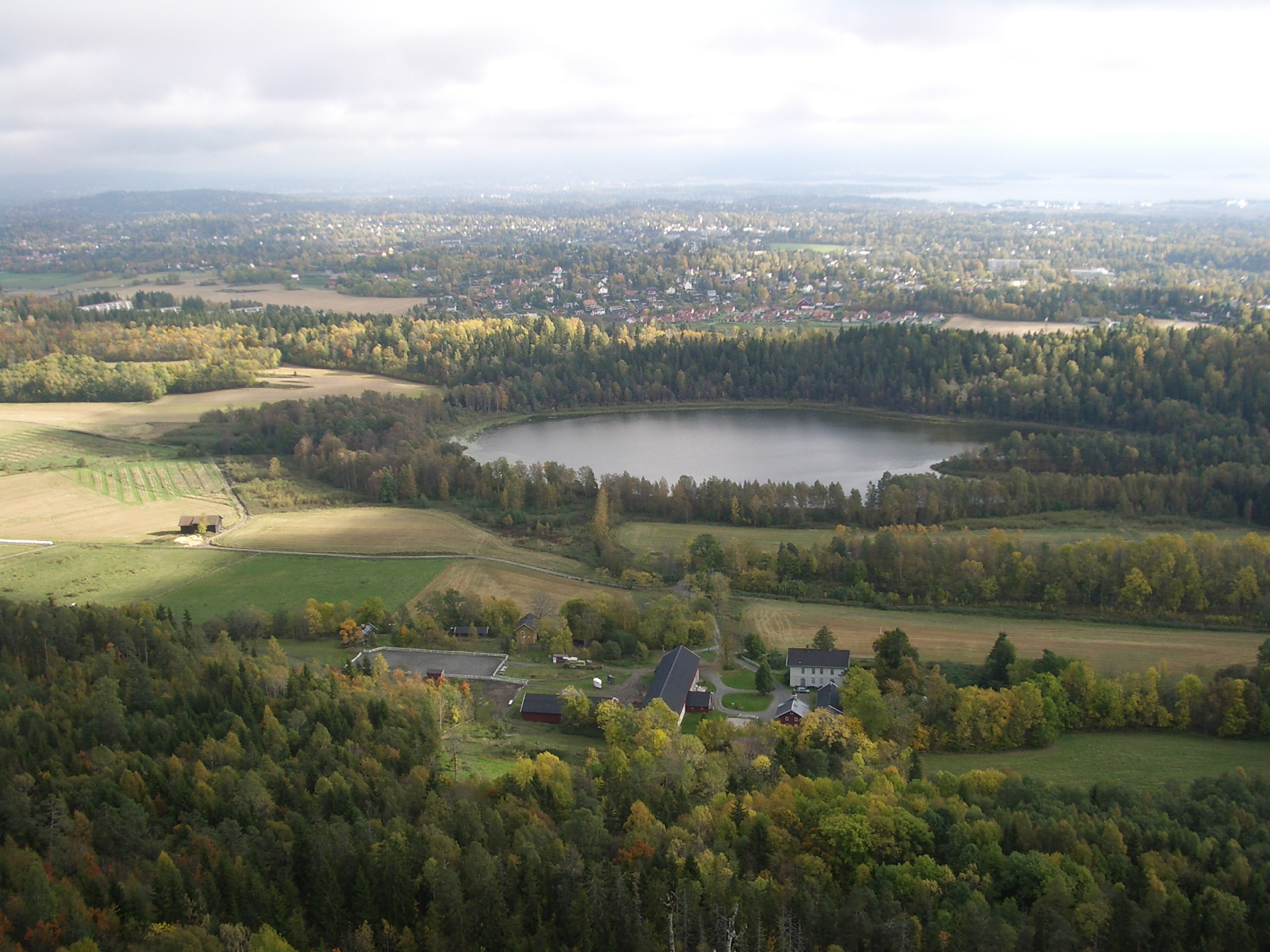

- Location within Akershus Location within Norway
- Location: Bærum, Akershus, Norway
- Coordinates: 59°55′17″N 10°32′25″E
- Basin countries: Norway
- Surface area: 11 ha (27 acres)
- Surface elevation: 99 m (325 ft)

Dælivannet is a lake in Bærum, Akershus county, Norway. It lies just beneath the Kolsås hill on the East side. The lake contains perch and pike and has a rich bird life.

The lake has been the subject of paintings and sketches by many significant artists including, Claude Monet, Eilif Peterssen and Christian Skredsvig (1854–1924), whose painting Seljefløiten shows a boy playing the flute by the South-East side of Dælivannet.
