= Gulbrand Hagen =

American newspaper editor, writer and photographer

Gulbrand Torsteinson Hagen (March 20, 1865 – February 25, 1919) was an American newspaper editor, writer and photographer in Minnesota and North Dakota at the end of the 19th century and beginning of the 20th.

== Biography ==
G. T. Hagen was born at Eggedal parish in Sigdal, Buskerud, Norway and immigrated at age 17 to the United States in 1882. He continued his education at the Minnesota Lutheran Seminary and Institute in Willmar, Minnesota. In 1894, Hagen purchased a Norwegian language newspaper and moved the paper to Mayville, North Dakota and then to Crookston, Minnesota.

The 1895 Minnesota State Census (not Federal) shows Gilbert Hagen living in Elbow Lake, Grant County, Minnesota, enumerated on June 1, 1895, having lived in the state for 6 years. Employment was Photographer.

Gilbert (Gudbrand or Gulbrand) T. Hagen is also listed in the Minnesota Historical Society Directory of Minnesota Photographers.

== Writing and Editing ==
Hagen edited and published Vesterheimen from 1894 to 1919. Vesterheimen was a reform-friendly weekly with most of the subscribers in northwestern Minnesota. Hagen continued to write and edit Vesterheimen (a weekly) when the English-only movement and the coming war created a chilling effect on German and Scandinavian language use. In 1917, Congress passed a law requiring all non English newspapers and journals to translate and submit for review any political texts or commentary for governmental review. Some papers were exempted. Hagen's Westerheimen and other reform-minded (or radical) papers were not.

In addition to his newspaper and career, Hagen wrote several Norwegian language books and short stories. In 1903, Hagen wrote and published the novella Per Kjolseth, eller Manden til Marit, a comic sequel to Allan Saetre's popular Norwegian-American novella Farmerkonen Marit Kjølseths erfaringer i Chicago (Chicago, Ill.: J. Anderson Pub. Co., 1904). In both books, Marit's husband Per is represented as a striver, eager (perhaps too eager) to be Americanized.

== Hagen Children ==
GT Hagen and his wife, Anna (Vik) had eight children. Their son Harold Hagen was a publisher and editor of a Norwegian language newspaper and publisher of the Polk County Leader in Crookston. Harold Hagen was elected as a candidate of the Farmer-Labor Party to the House of Representatives, representing Minnesota's 9th congressional district. He was subsequently re-elected as a Republican U.S. Representative from 1943 to 1955. Altogether, he served in the 78th, 79th, 80th, 81st, 82nd, and 83rd congresses (January 3, 1943 – January 3, 1955). Harold Hagen.

George Hagen (b. 1903) served in the United States Bureau of the Census; 1924 to 1928, the US Department of Justice Federal Bureau of Investigation (Special Agent); 1929 to 1930. He was County Attorney: Polk County, Minnesota; 1931 to 1934. George Hagen also served in the 50th, 51st and 52nd Minnesota legislature.

Hagen's eldest daughter Ida Hagen Kirn studied with, and served as a secretary to, Norwegian-American novelist Ole Edvart Rolvaag while attending St. Olaf College in the early part of the 20th century. Ms. Hagen taught Norwegian at St Olaf in 1919 to 1920; she maintained a correspondence with Rolvaag until his death in 1931. An endowed scholarship (the Ida Hagen Kirn Endowed Scholarship) was set up at her alma mater (St. Olaf College) after her death. (St. Olaf College website, 2022.

== Death ==
G. T. Hagen died February 24, 1919, from complications following Spanish flu. 1918 flu pandemic.

== Selected works ==
- Bruden fra fjeldet. (Mayville, North Dakota: Vesterheimen. 1898)
- Fra Snelandets Hytter. Fortællinger og gamle Sagn fra Norge. (Mayville, North Dakota. Vesterheimen. 1898)
- Per Kjolseth, eller "Manden til Marit. (Crookston, Minnesota: Vesterheimen. 1903), cover and first pages in translation only.

== Other sources ==
- Hervin, S. ("Review of "Per Kjolseth," in Smuler. November, 1903)
- Wist, Johan B., (Norsk-Amerikanernes Festskrift, Sigdalsaget, 1914)

== Related Reading ==
- Øverland, Orm. The Western Home: A Literary History of Norwegian America. (Northfield, MN: Author Series Norwegian American Historical Association, 1996)
- Lovoll, Odd Sverre (2010) Norwegian Newspapers in America: Connecting Norway and the New Land (Minnesota Historical Society) ISBN 9780873517966
- Ager, Waldemar. Norsk-amerikanernes festskrift. 1914 Decorah, Iowa : Symra Co.)
