= Eggedal =

Municipality in Norway

Coordinates: 60°14′N 9°22′E

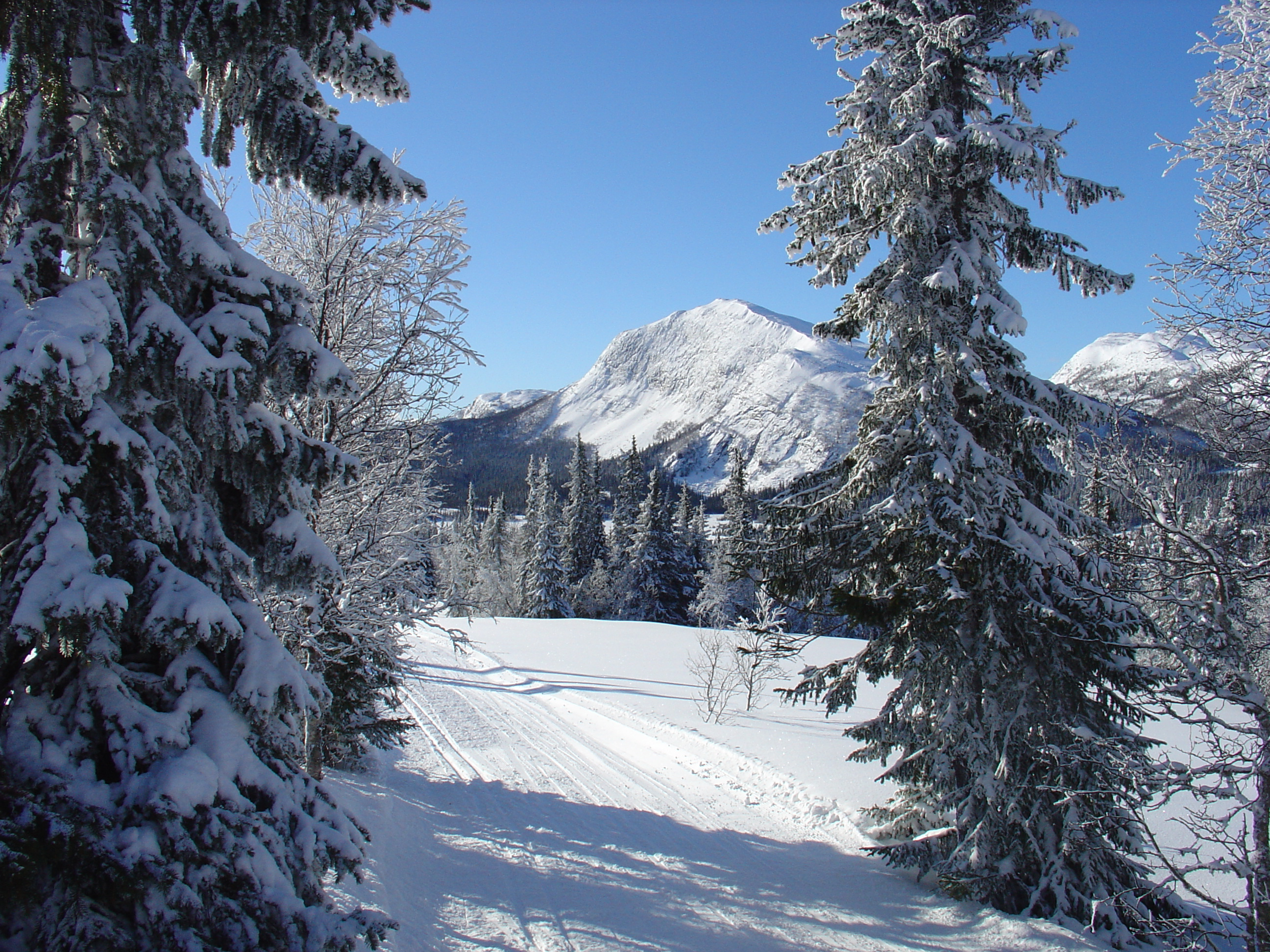
Haglebunatten in Eggedal

Eggedal is a valley and parish in Buskerud county, Norway. It consists of the northwestern half of the municipality of Sigdal.

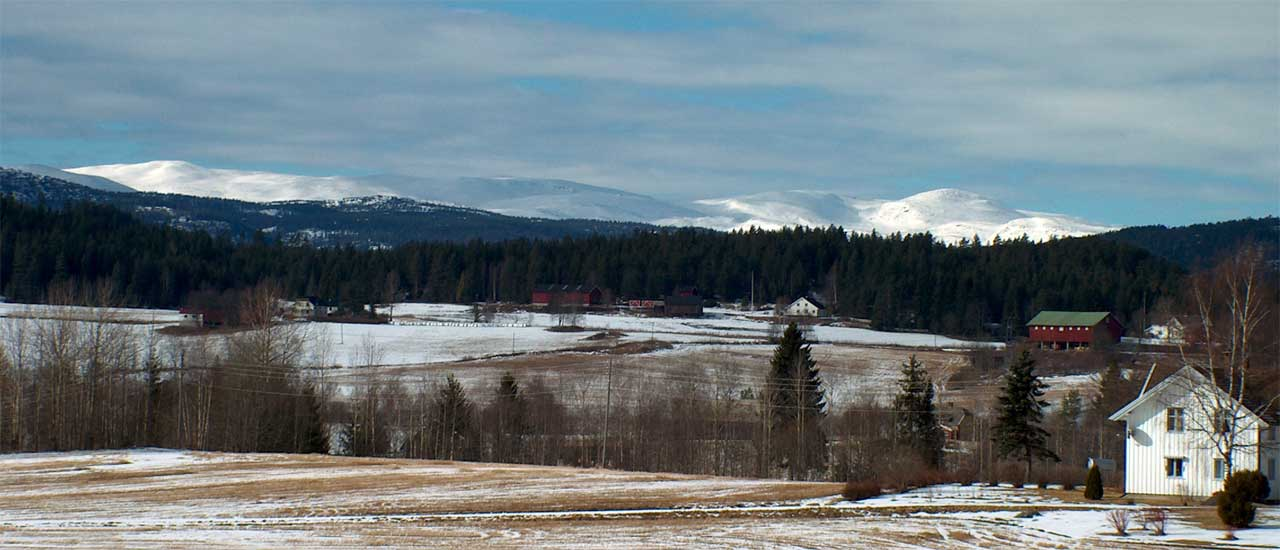
Norefjell mountain range seen from Sokna

== Location ==
Eggedal is located between Numedalsfjellene in the west and Norefjell in the east, stretching northwards from the mountain Andersnatten, and borders in the north to Flå in Hallingdal. Eggedal is situated to the west of the Norefjell mountain range. There is farmland on the valley floor. In all other directions, the terrain rises quite steeply. The sprawling valley of Eggedal was formed by the meandering Eggedøla River. It begins as the Haglebu river a few miles north of Lake Haglebuvatna with top sources in the regions bordering Nes and Nore og Uvdal. As it passes through Eggedal, the river is known as the Eggedøla until it reaches Lake Soneren. As it exits the lake, the name is changed to the Simoa river.

== Attractions ==
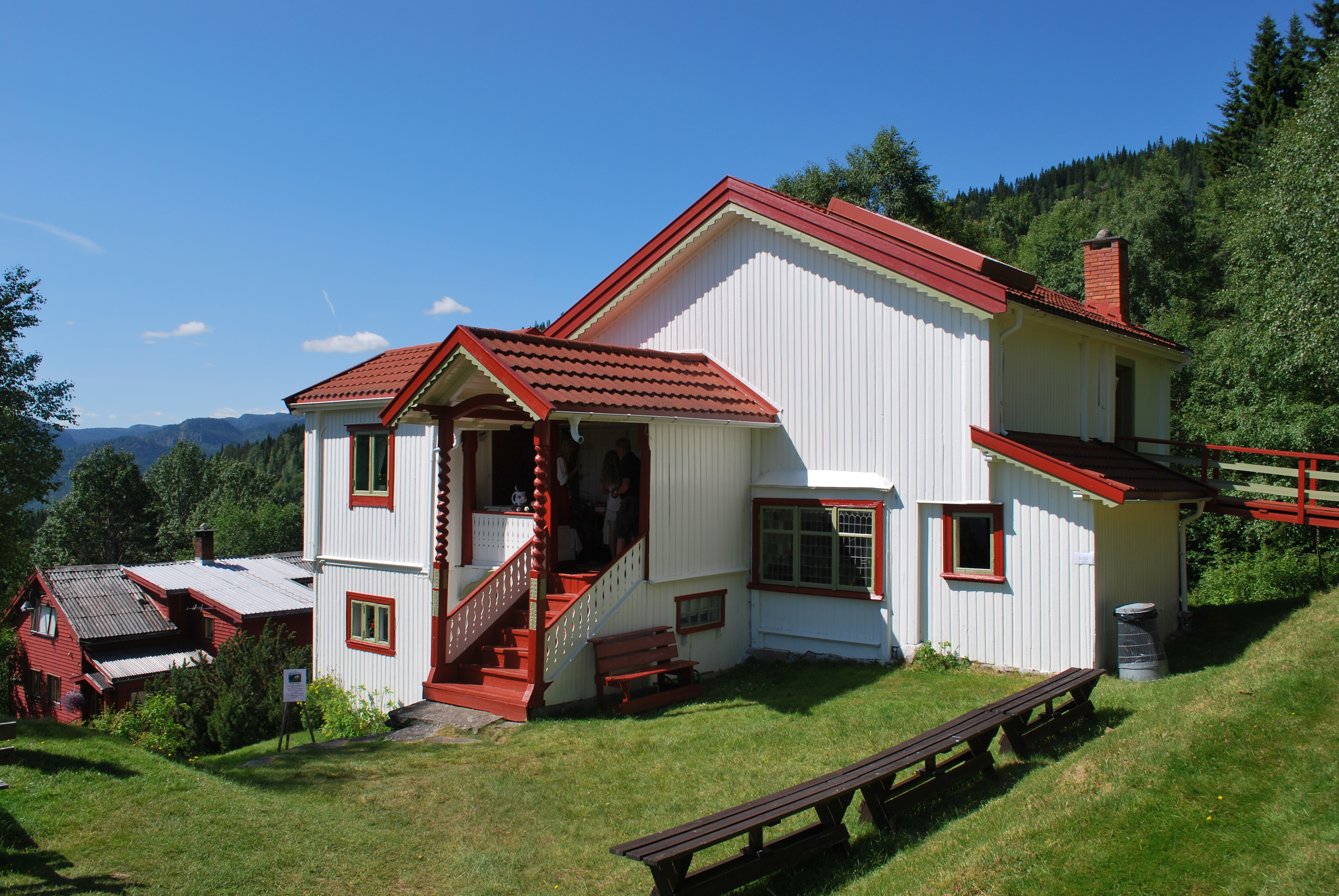
Hagan in Eggedal

Eggedal Vestfjell has hiking and skiing in large undisturbed natural areas. The cabin area is bordered to the south by the largest nature reserve Trillemarka. These trails are in hiking country in the main from 700 and up to 1100m. The tracks are also associated with the trail at Norefjell where the highest point is 1,460 m.

Hagan, the former home of Norwegian painter and writer Christian Skredsvig, is situated in Eggedal with a clear view of the valley. Hagan, which was for many years an artist studio, is now a museum. Both the house and the studio are still much the same as they were when Christian Skredsvig lived here.

Eggedal Mølle is a museum in Eggedal. Previously, it had been a small water mill and is the only water-powered mill left in Norway. The mill was built in 1912 and was in operation until 1965. The mill was restored and put into operation again with hydropower.

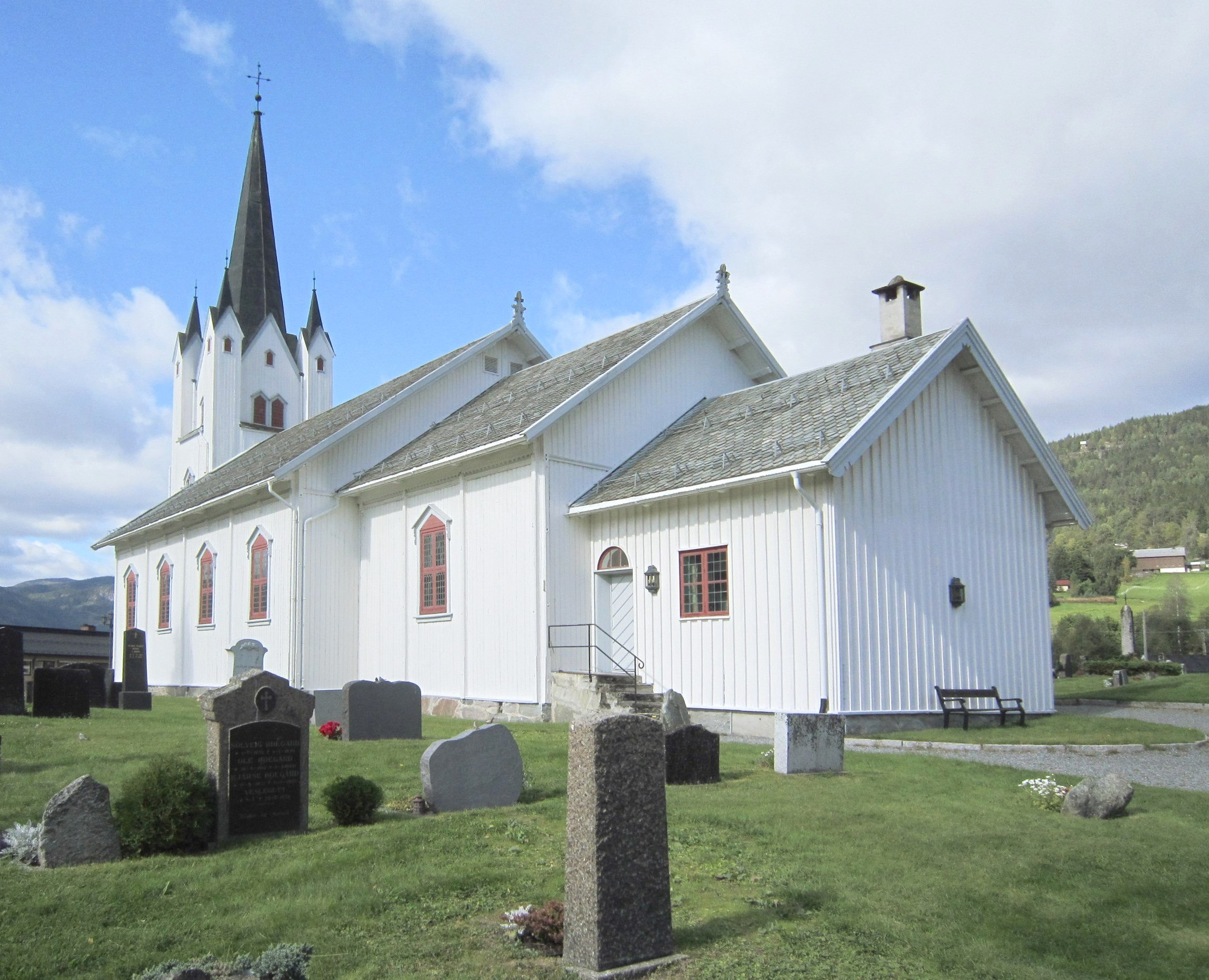
Eggedal Church

== Eggedal Church ==
Eggedal is a parish, an ecclesiastical division rather than a political division. It consists of the portion of the municipality Sigdal served by the Eggedal Church. The church is located near the center of the parish. Eggedal Church dates from 1878. The church was designed by the Norwegian architectural firm of Støren og Steenstrup. It is built of wood and has 300 seats. Access to the site is via Norwegian county road 287 (Fv287). Eggedal Church is an annex of Sigdal in Eiker prosti within the Diocese of Tunsberg.
