= Erik Ramstad =

Norwegian-American pioneer (1860–1951)

Erik Reiersen Ramstad (January 17, 1860 – January 21, 1951) was one of the founders of Minot, North Dakota.

== Biography ==
Ramstad was the son of tenant farmer Reier Pedersen and Anne Ellefsdatter. He was born at Køsahaugen in Sigdal in Buskerud, Norway. Erik left Norway in 1879. His brother Peder followed him to America in 1880, and his mother Anne and sister Berte followed in 1885.

The brothers were early settlers in the Souris River Valley of North Dakota, arriving in May 1883. They staked a claim to property on both the north and south sides of the Souris River. With the coming of the Great Northern Railway during the summer of 1886, Erik Ramstad agreed to relinquish 40 acres (16 ha) of land on the south side of the Souris River, retaining sites north of the river. The Great Northern roundhouse and the Minot business district were both built on this southern acreage.

Both Erik and Peter Ramstad remained active in the development of Minot. In 1886, the first Lutheran church service within Minot was held at the Peter Ramstad home. The first Lutheran Church in Minot was built in the early 1900s on land originally belonging to Erik Ramstad. Erik was also involved in local politics for many years, served as president of the Scandinavian American Bank, and was co-owner of the Great Northern Lumber Company.

Erik Ramstad later donated part of his remaining property, which became the site of Minot State University. Erik Ramstad Middle School, originally south of the MSU campus, but now on the north end of Minot, is named after him. The original school was destroyed by the 2011 Souris River flood and was razed; the new campus opened in December 2013.

== Personal life ==
On February 3, 1883, Erik Ramstad married Oline "Lena" Oleson from Grafton. Peter Ramstad died at age 74 on July 14, 1930, and Erik Ramstad died at age 91 on January 21, 1951. Both brothers died in Minot and were buried in the First Lutheran Church Cemetery next to Minot State University.

== Other Source ==
- Keillor, Steven J. (2002) Erik Ramstad and the Empire Builder (North American Heritage Press, Minot, ND)
