= Sigdal House =

Building in North Dakota, United States

Coordinates: 48°13′34″N 101°17′51″W

Sigdal House is an historic Norwegian log home which was relocated to Minot, North Dakota.

The Sigdal House is a 230-year-old house originally from the Vatnas area of Sigdal, Norway. It is located in the Scandinavian Heritage Park situated in the Upper Brooklyn neighborhood of Minot, North Dakota. It is typical of houses common to rural Norway during the 19th century. The decorations on the doors inside the house as they were painted about 1800 and were restored prior to the house coming to America. The house was purchased by the Scandinavian Heritage Association and restored to museum standards. The house had been dismantled in Norway, shipped to and reassembled on site at the park. The completed house was dedicated on October 15, 1991, during the annual Norsk Høstfest.

== Related reading ==
- Dregni, Eric (2014) Vikings in the Attic: In Search of Nordic America (University of Minnesota Press) ISBN 9781452931371
- Dregni, Eric (2006) Midwest Marvels: Roadside Attractions Across Iowa, Minnesota, the Dakotas, and Wisconsin (University of Minnesota Press) ISBN 9780816642908
