= Trillemarka =

Nature reserve in Buskerud, Norway

Trillemarka Nature Reserve
- IUCN category Ia (strict nature reserve)
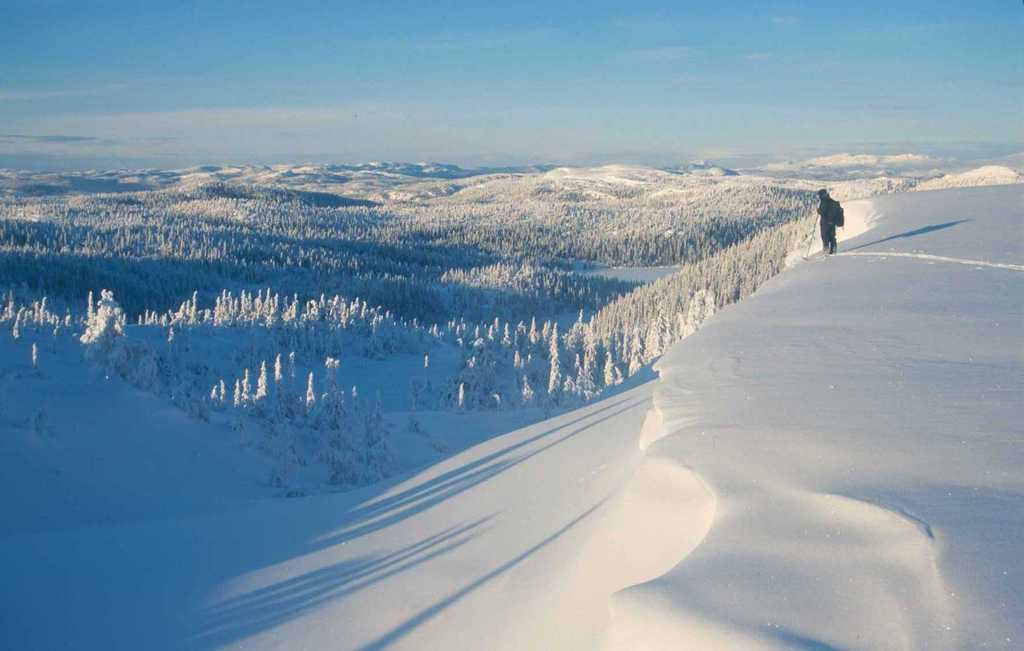
- Trilledalen seen from Langseterfjell

- Location within Norway
- Location: Sigdal, Buskerud, Norway
- Nearest city: Drammen
- Coordinates: 60.096°N 9.23°E
- Area: 147 km^{2} (57 mi^{2})
- Established: 2008
- Governing body: Directorate for Nature Management

Trillemarka (Trillemarka-Rollagsfjell) is a 147 km^{2} (57 mi^{2}) nature reserve located in Buskerud, Norway. It was created on December 13, 2002, and is located in the hilly and mountainous areas between Nore in Numedal and Solevann in Sigdal, partially in the municipalities of Sigdal, Nore og Uvdal, and Rollag. The nature reserve consists of one of the largest natural forest areas in central Østlandet and includes virgin forest and 93 red list species.

The Norwegian government decided on January 8, 2008, that 147 km^{2} (57 mi^{2}) were to be protected. The landowners received NOK 100 million in compensation.

== Controversy ==
There has been a large controversy between environmentalists and the owners of the forest. As a consequence of the debate there has been suggested four different sizes for an expansion of the nature reserve:

1. 205–210 km^{2} (suggested by the Norwegian Institute for Nature Research, supported by environmentalists)
2. 169 km^{2} (suggested by the governor)
3. 147 km^{2} (suggested by the governor)
4. 99 km^{2} (suggested by the forest owners)

Among the environmentalist organizations that have taken an interest in Trillemarka, are Natur og Ungdom, WWF, and Friends of the Earth, Norway.
