= Theodor Kittelsen =

Norwegian artist (1857–1914)

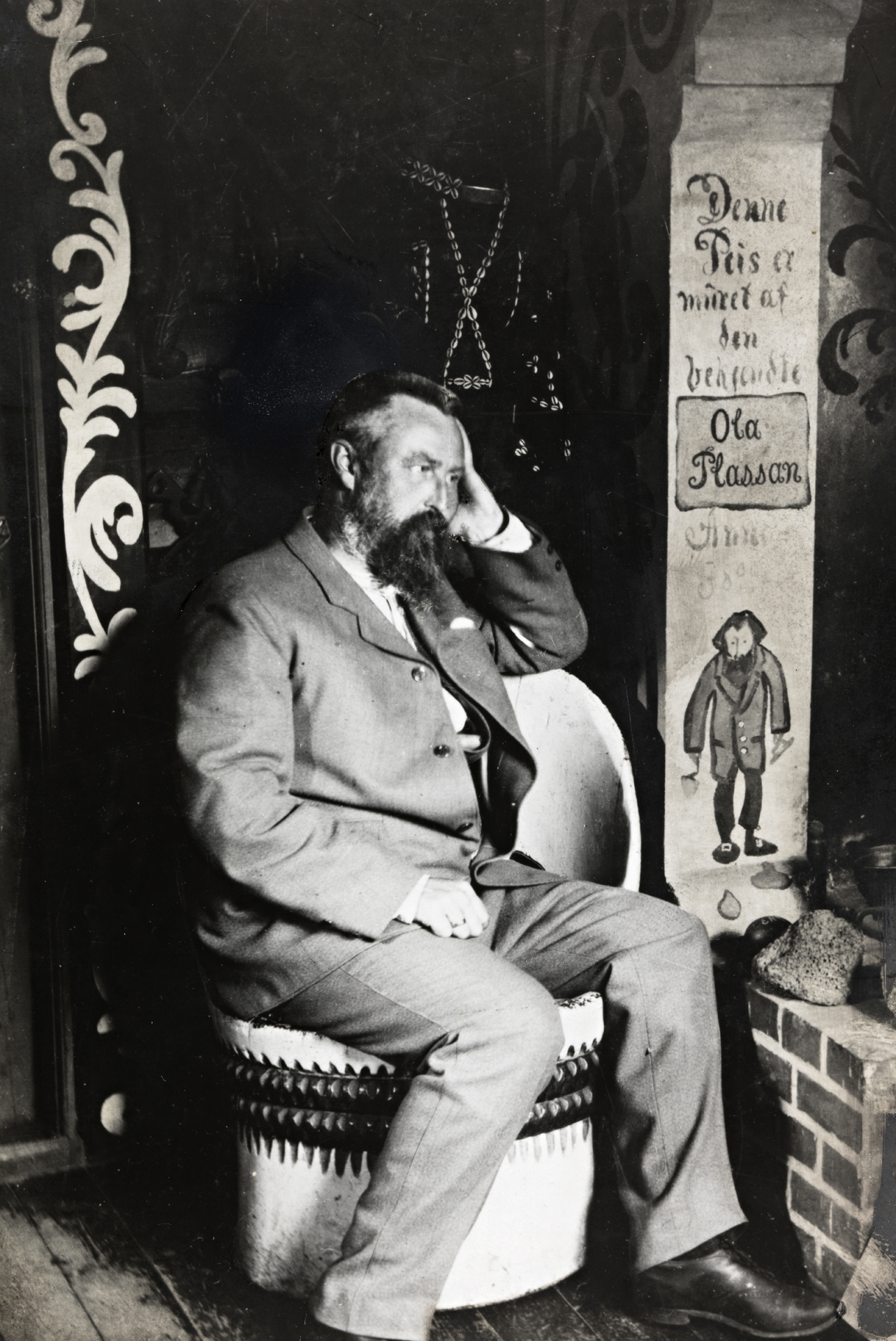
- Kittelsen in 1908
- Born: 27 April 1857; Kragerø, Grenland, Norway
- Died: 21 January 1914 (aged 56); Jeløya, Østfold, Norway
- Occupations: Artist, illustrator
- Awards: Royal Norwegian Order of St. Olav

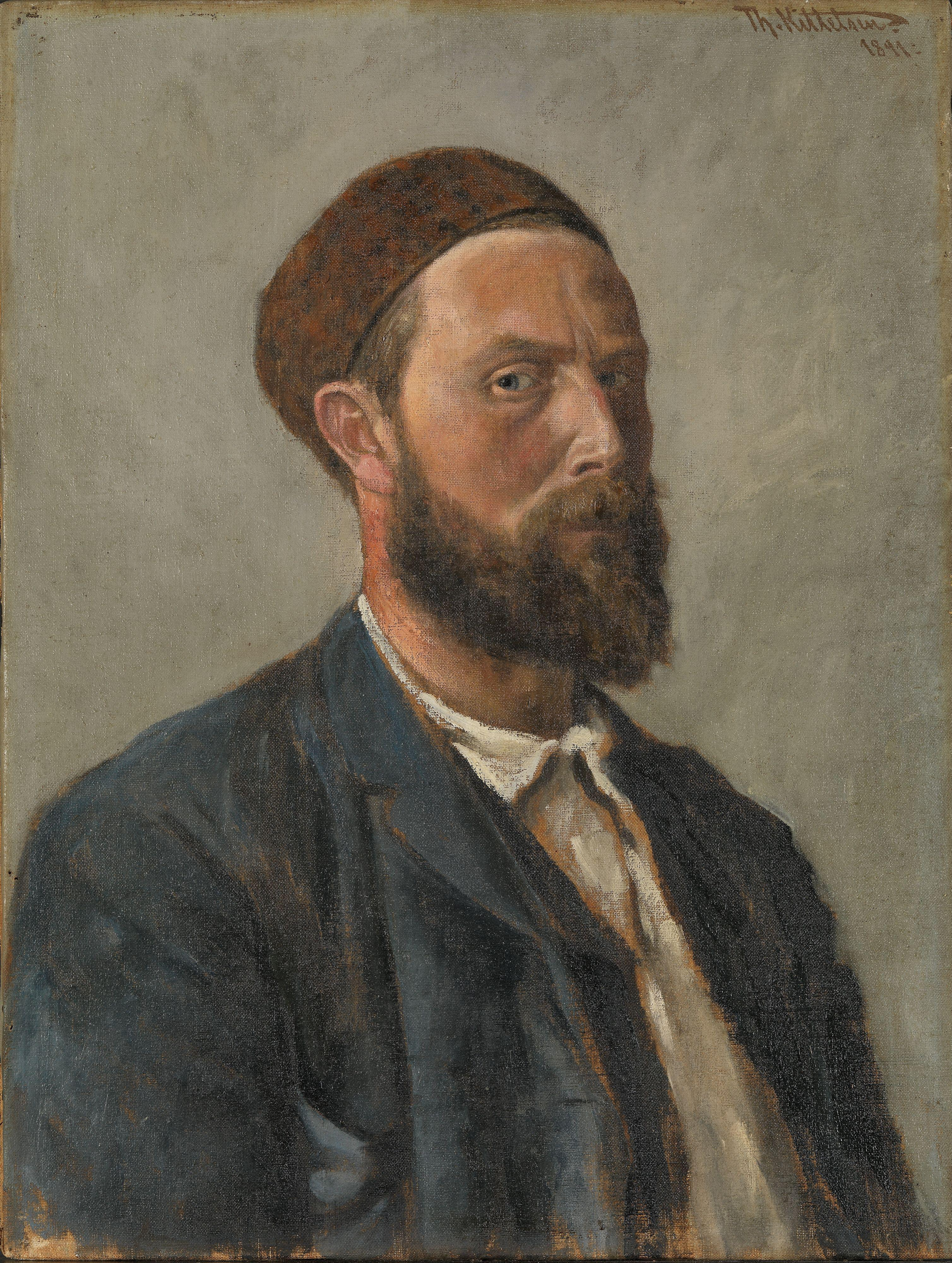
Self-portrait (1891)

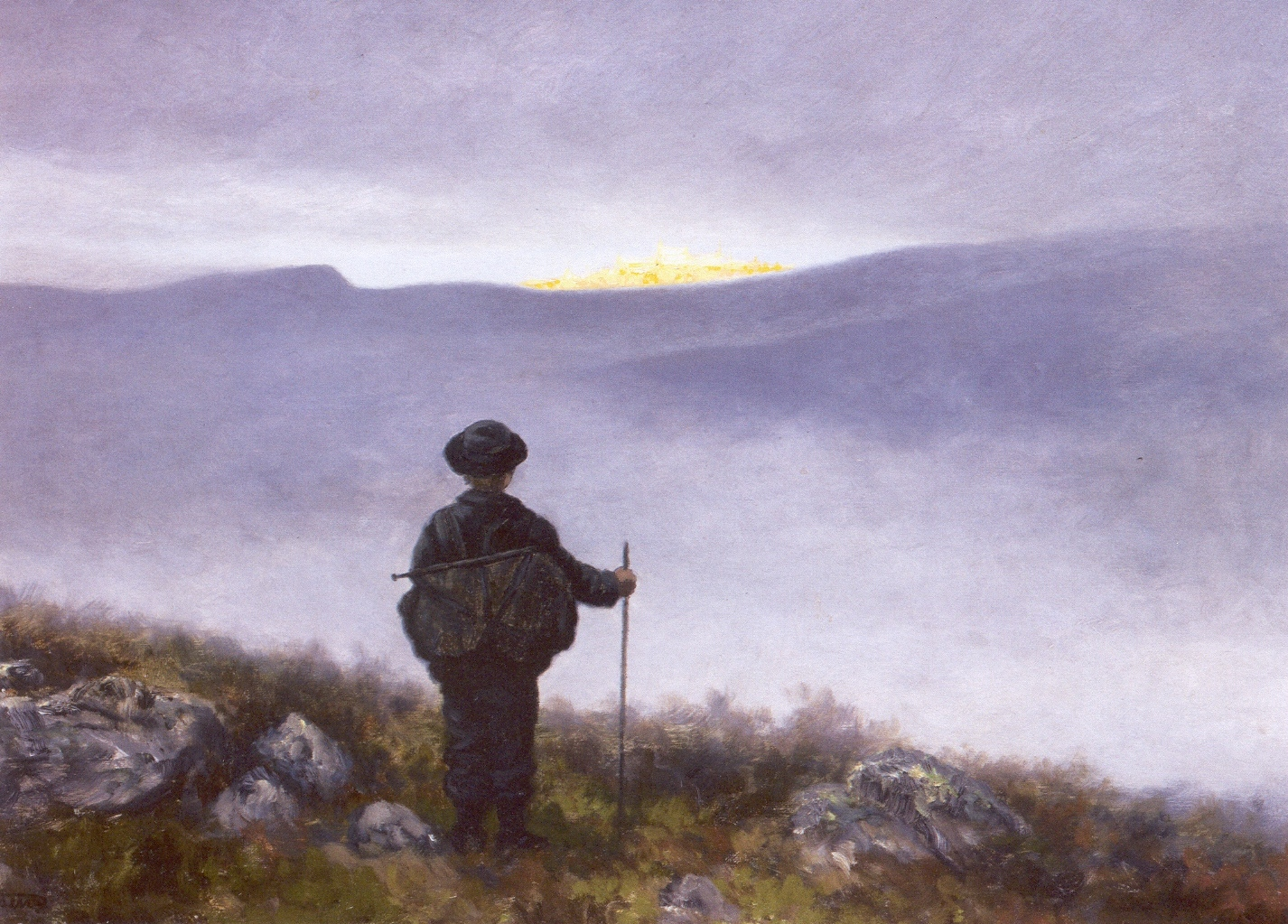
Soria Moria from Norske Folkeeventyr

Theodor Severin Kittelsen (27 April 1857 – 21 January 1914) was a Norwegian artist. Kittelsen was highly admired and popular during his career and became famous for his nature paintings, as well as for his illustrations of fairy tales and legends, especially of trolls.

== Early life ==
Kittelsen was born in the coastal town of Kragerø in Grenland, Norway. His father died when he was young, leaving a wife and eight children in difficult circumstances. Theodor was only 11 years old when he was apprenticed to a watchmaker. When at the age of 17 his talent was discovered by Diderich Maria Aall, he became a pupil at Wilhelm von Hannos drawing school in Christiania (now Oslo). Because of generous financial support by Aall, he later studied in Munich. However, in 1879 Diderich Aall could no longer manage to support him, so Kittelsen had to earn his money as a draftsman for German newspapers and magazines.

== Career ==
In 1882, Kittelsen was granted a state scholarship to study in Paris, though he would return to Munich at his own expense by the following year. In 1887, he returned to Norway for good, where he would find inspiration in the surrounding nature. He spent the next two years in Lofoten, where he lived with his sister and brother-in-law at Skomvær Lighthouse. Kittelsen also started to write texts to his drawings there.

Kittelsen and his family settled in a home and artist studio, which he called Lauvlia, near Prestfoss during 1899, where he would spend his best artistic years. During this period, Kittelsen was hired to illustrate Norwegian Folktales (Norwegian: Norske Folkeeventyr) by the Norwegian folklore collector Peter Christen Asbjørnsen and Jørgen Moe. In 1908 he was made Knight of The Royal Norwegian Order of St. Olav. However, he was forced to sell and leave Lauvlia in 1910 due to failing health. Kittelsen was granted an artist's stipend in 1911; he died in Jeløya in 1914. After his death, his widow, Inga Kittelsen, was granted an annual salary from the Storting.

== Style ==
Kittelsen's style had elements of Neo-Romantic and naïve painting. As a national artist, he is highly respected and well-known in Norway but does not receive much international attention, which is the reason that his name is often not included in registers of internationally recognized painters and artists.

== Dedicated museums ==
- Lauvlia, his home from 1899 to 1910, is located in Sigdal north of Prestfoss along Highway Fv287, with a scenic view of Lake Soneren. The surrounding area, in particular Mount Andersnatten which overlooks the lake a few kilometres north, inspired some of Kittelsen's most famous landscapes. Today Lauvlia is a private museum featuring an exhibition of Kittelsen's original work. Lauvlia is decorated with Kittelsen's own woodcarvings and murals. A new exhibition of original Kittelsen works is opened each year with painting and drawing activities arranged for children. The paintings exhibited are rotated each year.
- Theodor Kittelsen Museum at Blaafarveværket is at the Skuterudhøyden ridge by the Cobalt Mines. Kittelsen's poetical interpretations of nature, the forest, the mountains, and trolls are presented in the form of carved furniture, oil paintings, watercolours, and drawings. There are new exhibitions each year.
- The house where the artist grew up in Kragerø is also currently a museum devoted to his legacy.

== Cultural references ==
Black metal and folk metal bands such as Burzum, Empyrium, Otyg, and Satyricon have used some of his pictures as album art, notably illustrations taken from Kittelsen's book Svartedauen (The Black Death). Musician Phil Elverum named the tenth song on his 2017 album A Crow Looked at Me after Kittelesen's painting "Soria Moria" specifically, using it as an illustration of his grief. Kittelsen's 160th birthday was celebrated in a Google Doodle on 27 April 2017, giving him some exposure outside of Norway.

== Paintings and drawings ==
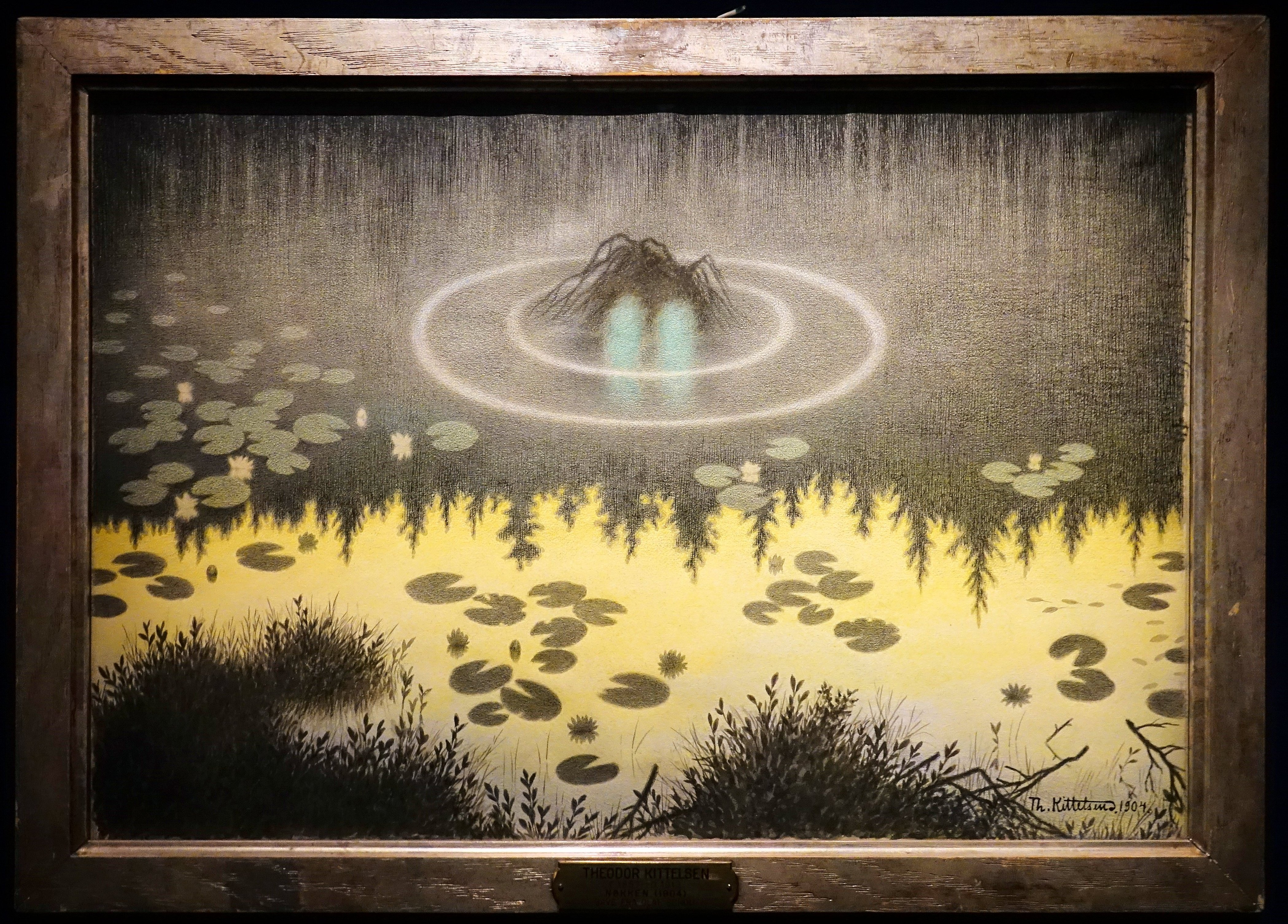
Nøkken, 1887–92 (The Nix)

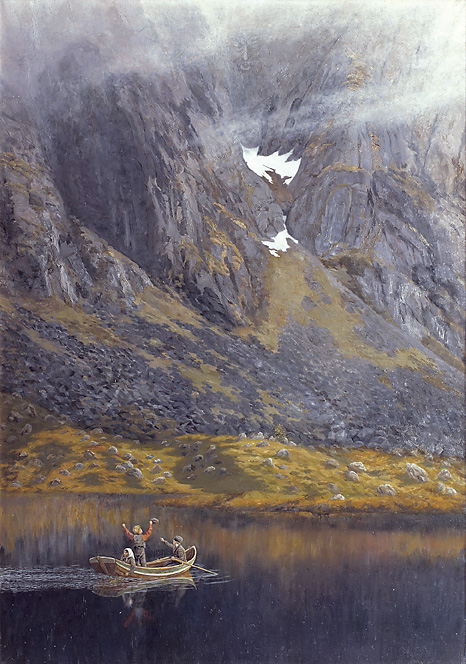
Ekko (Echo), 1888

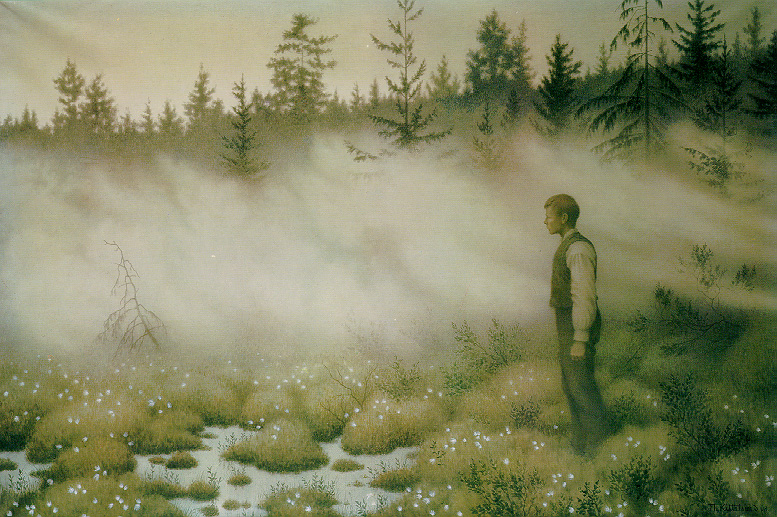
Huldra forsvant (The Hulder That Disappeared)

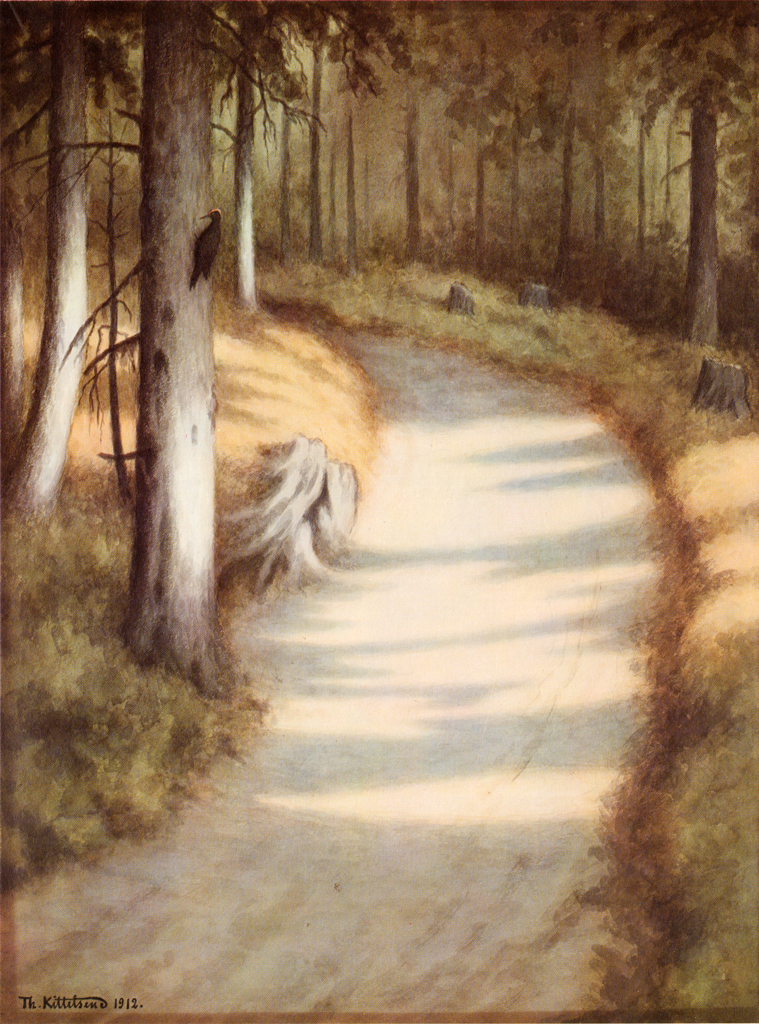
Hakkespett, 1912 (Woodpecker)

Kornstaur i måneskinn, c. 1900 (Stooks of Grain in Moonlight)

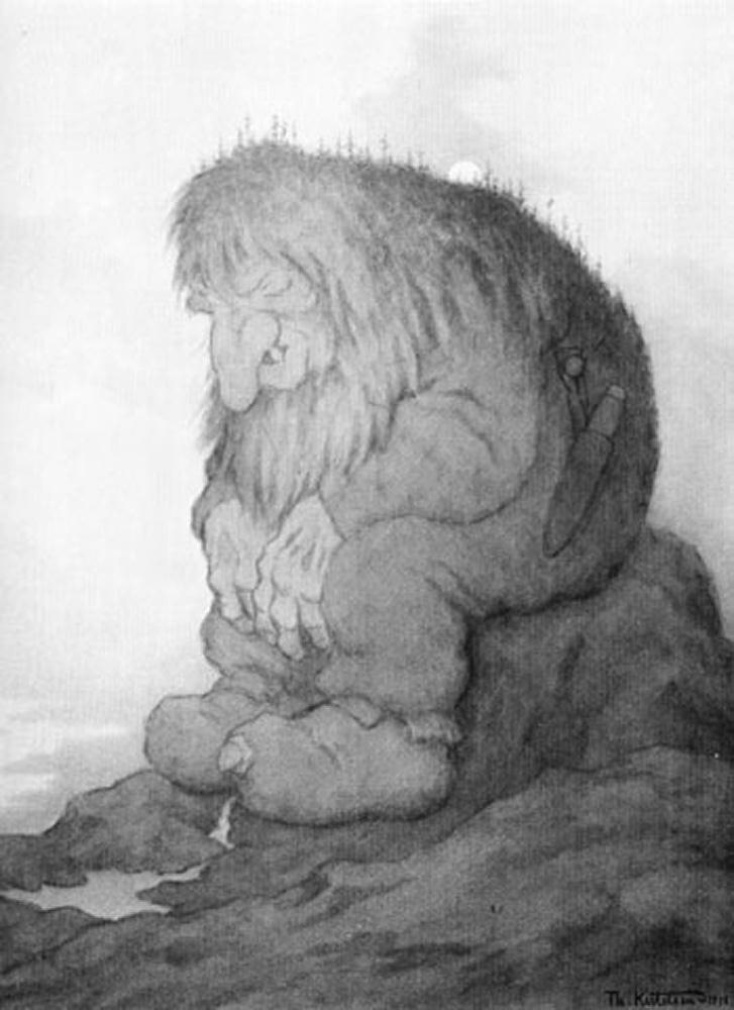
Trollet som grunner på hvor gammelt det er, 1911 (The troll who wonders how old he is)

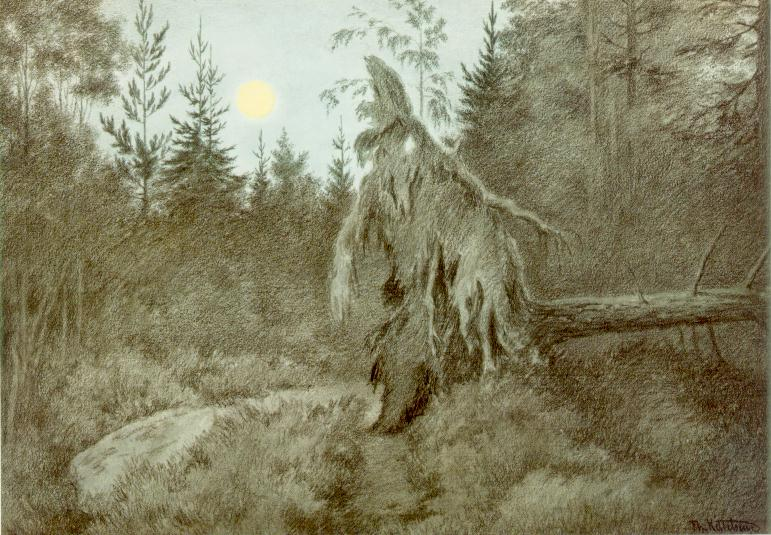
Det rusler og tusler rasler og tasler, 1900 (Creepy, Crawly, Rustling, Bustling)

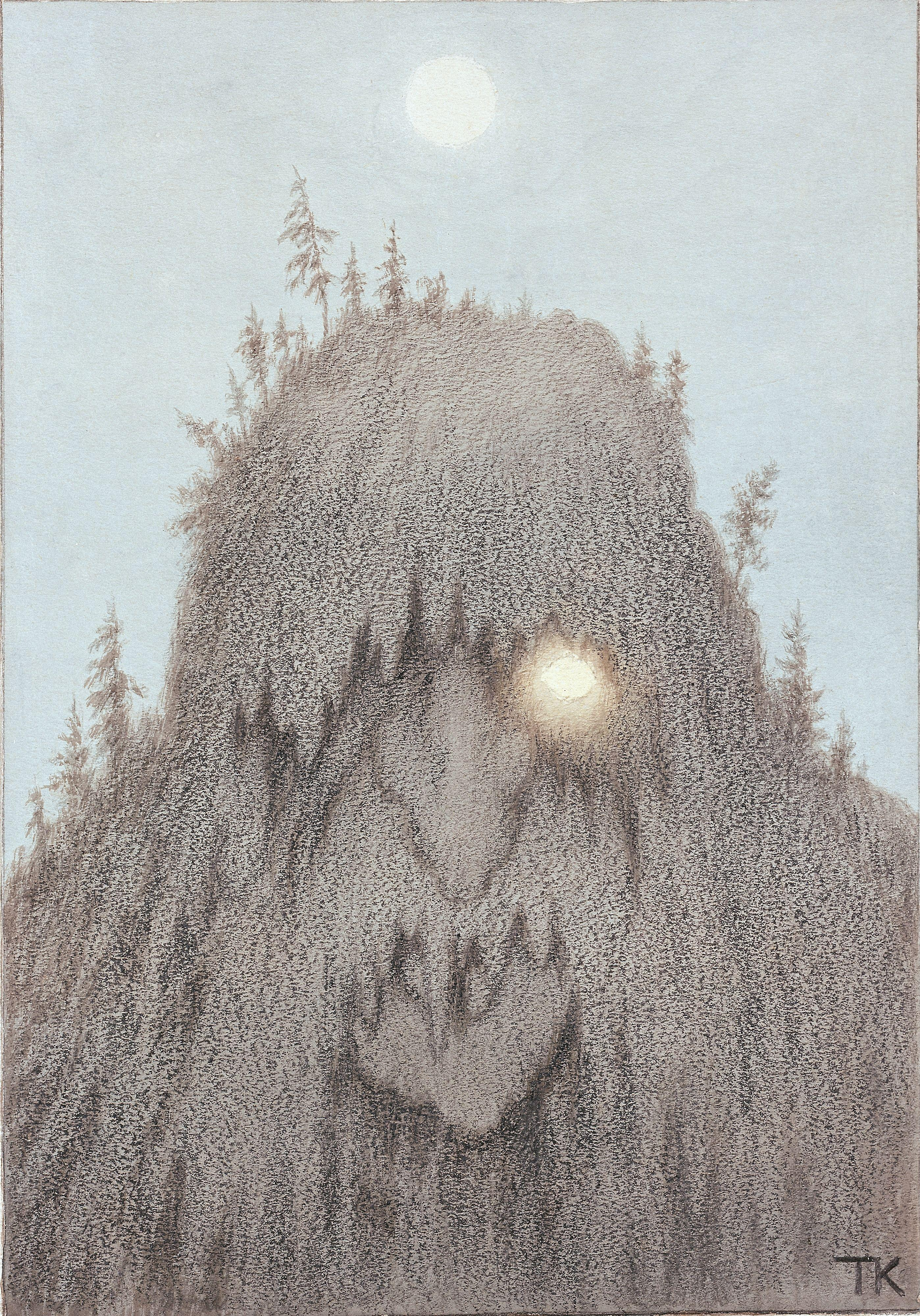
Skogtroll, 1906 (Forest Troll)

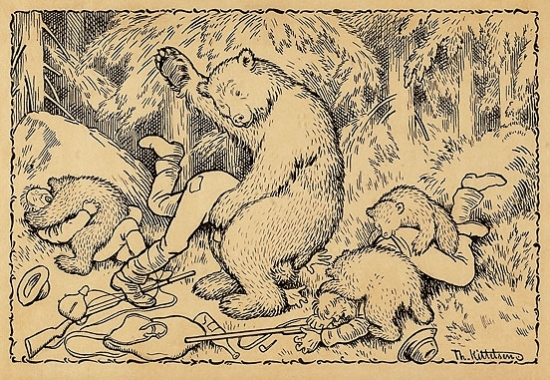
En uheldig bjørnejakt (An Unfortunate Bear Hunt)

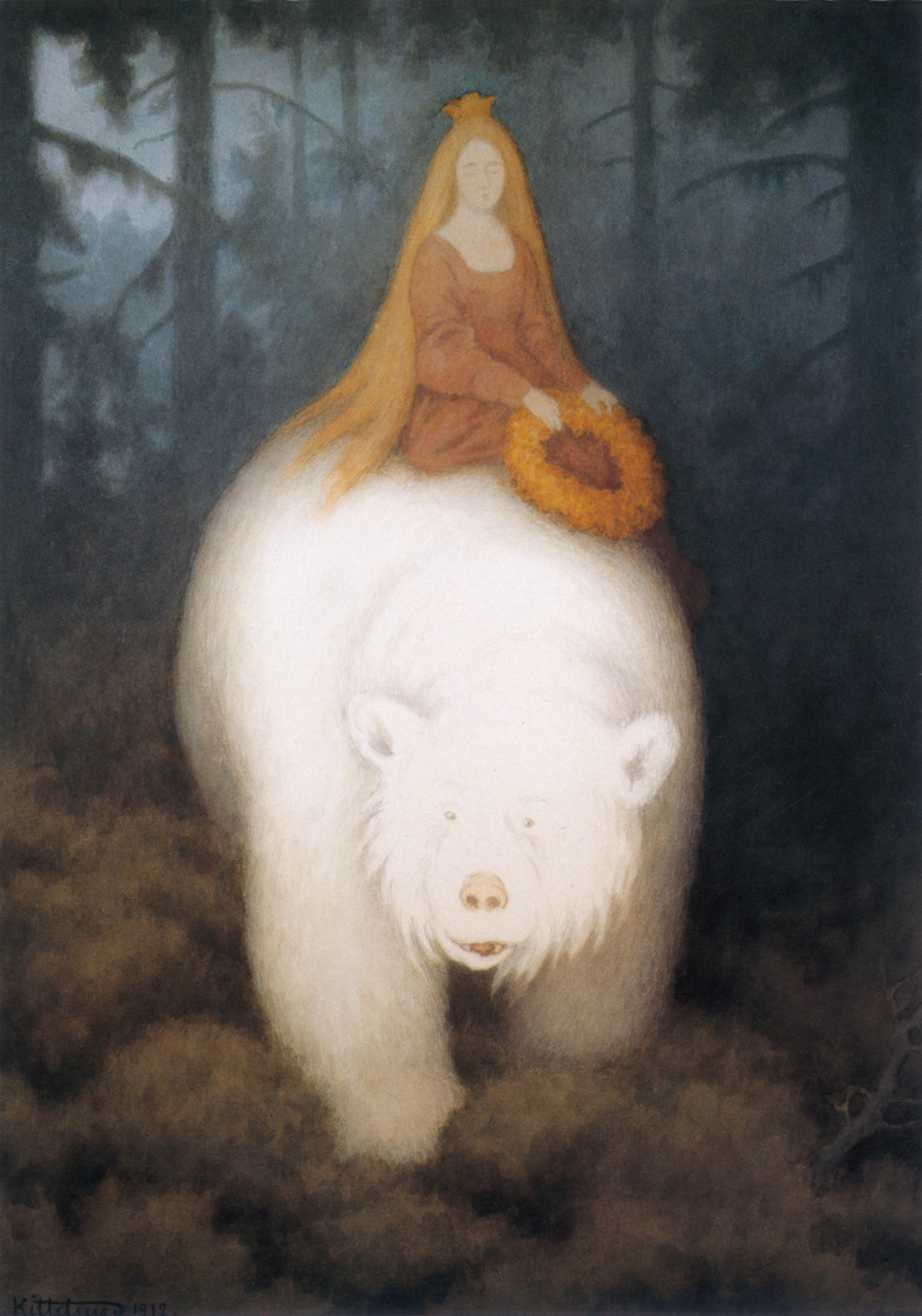
Kvitebjorn Kong Valemon, 1912 (White-Bear-King-Valemon)

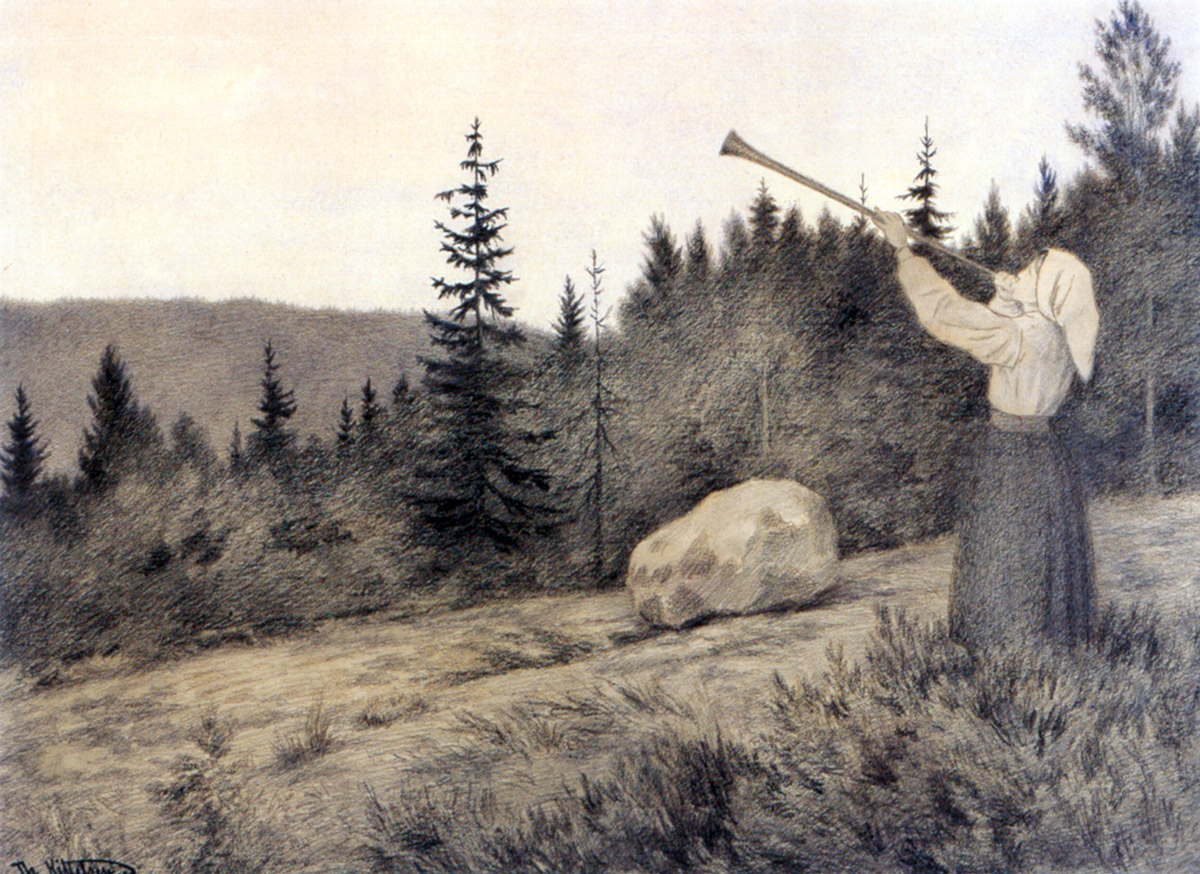
Op under Fjeldet toner en Lur, 1900 (Up in the Hills a Clarion Call Rings Out)

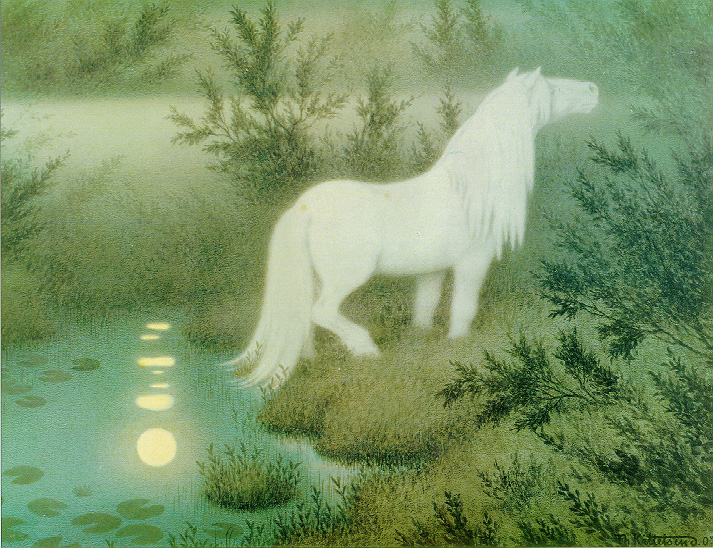
Nøkken som hvit hest, 1909 (The nix as a white horse)

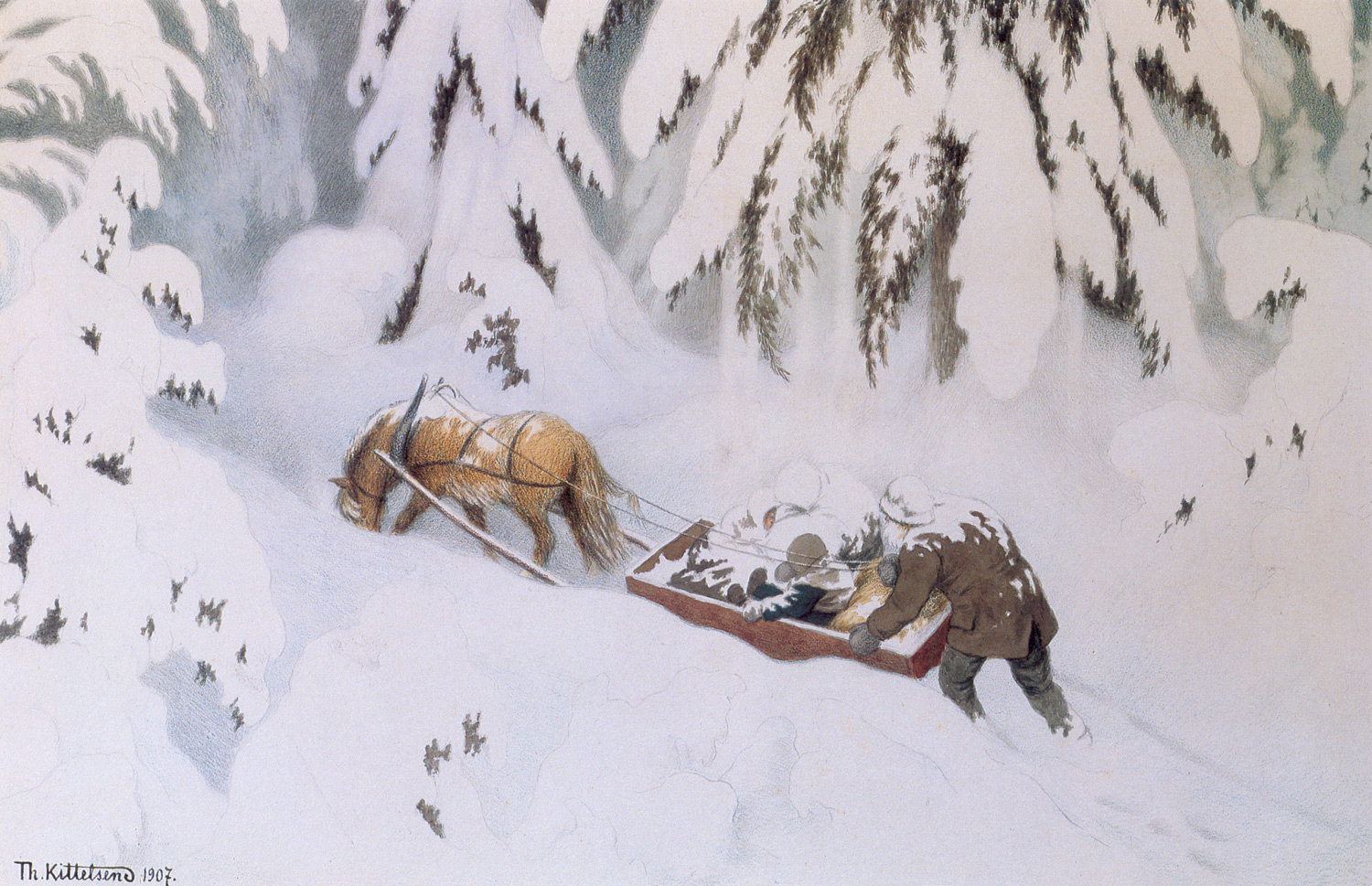
Juletroll, 1907 (Christmas Troll)

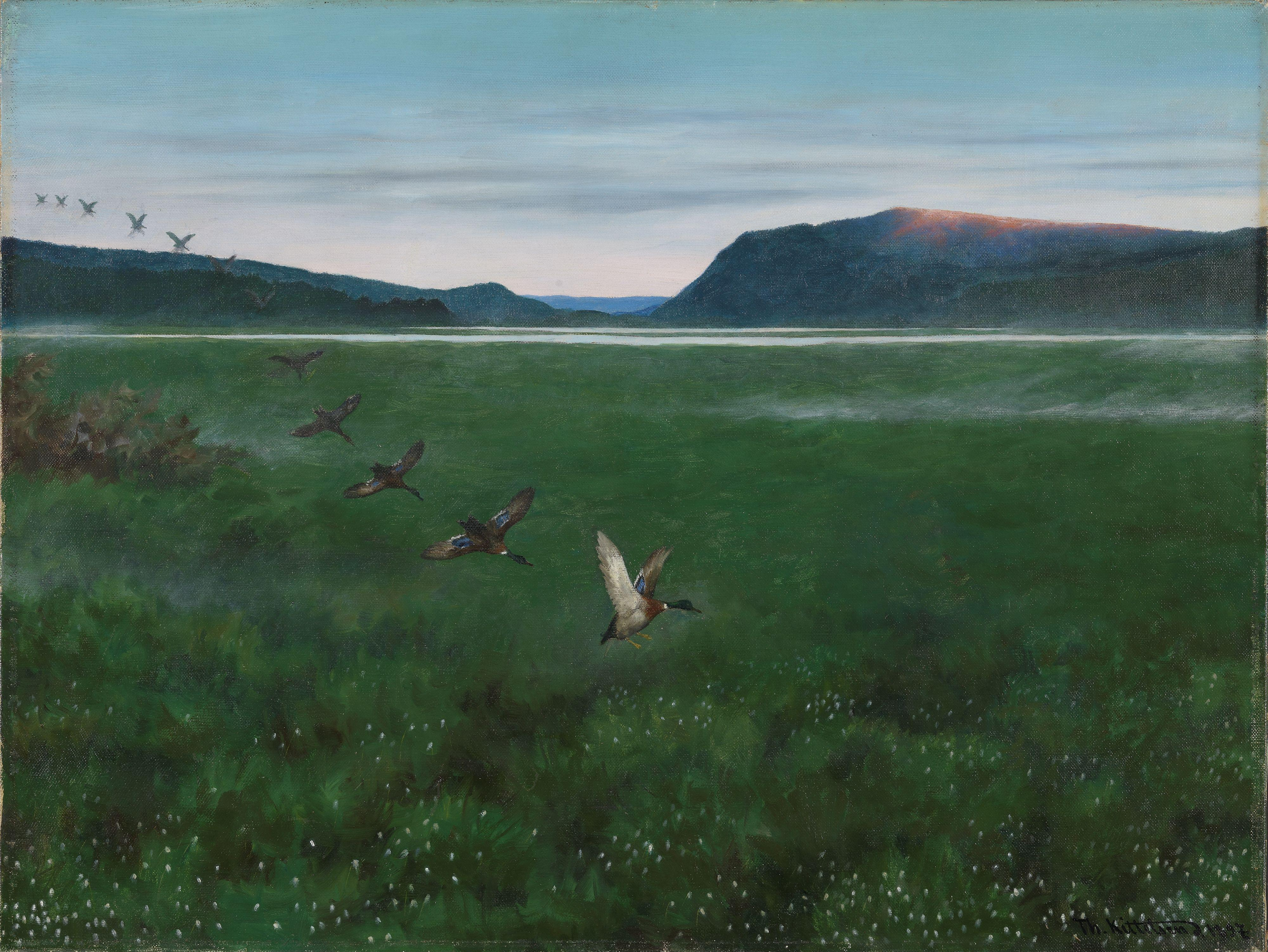
12 villender, 1897 (The 12 wild ducks)

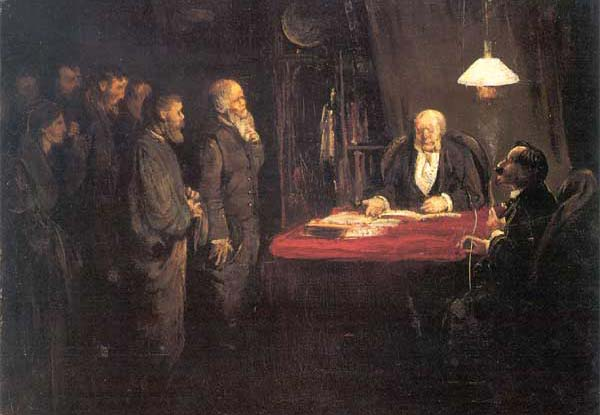
Streik, 1879 (Strike action)

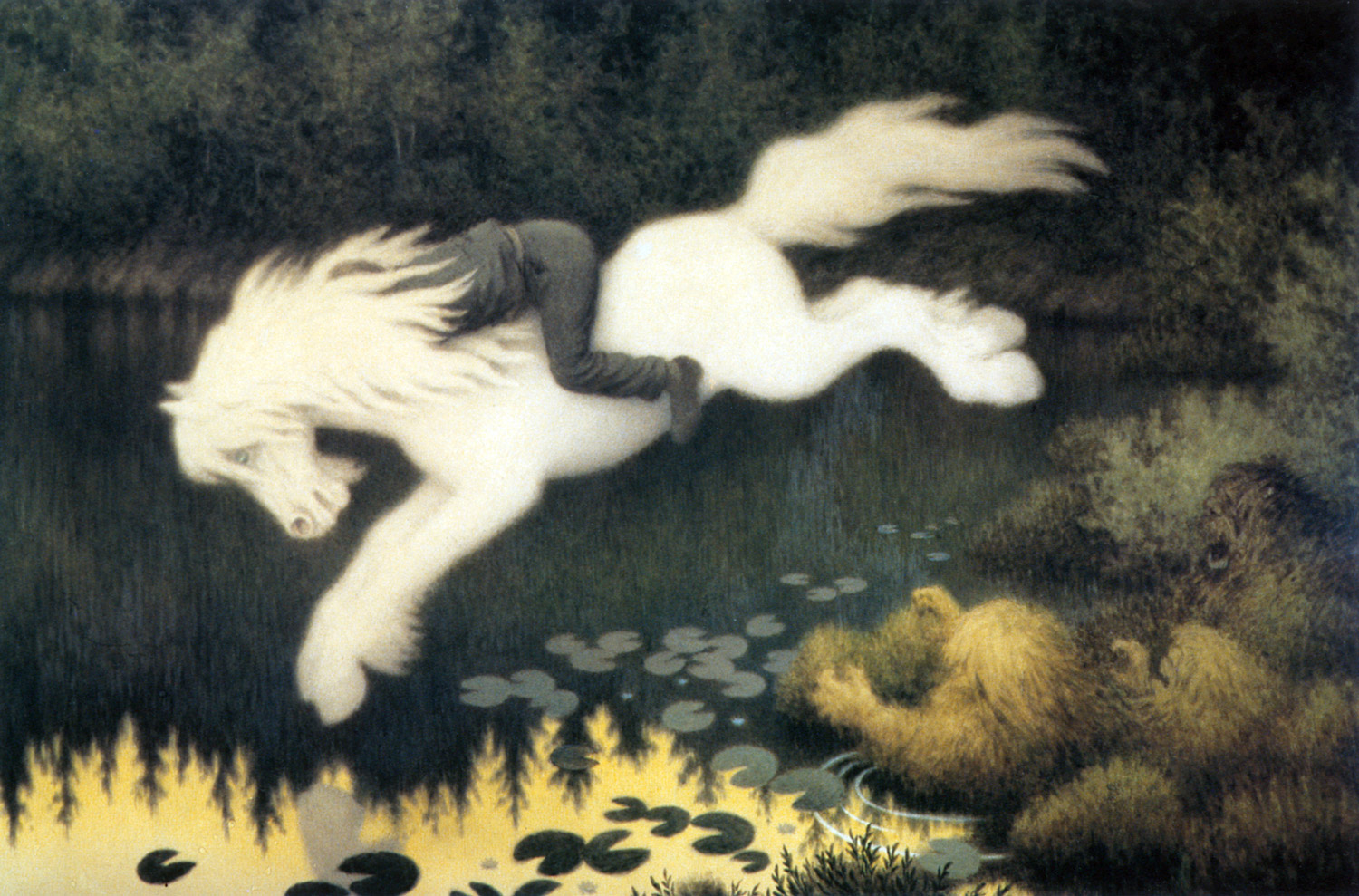
Gutt på hvit hest (Boy on white horse)

=== Illustrations for Svartedauen (Black Death) ===
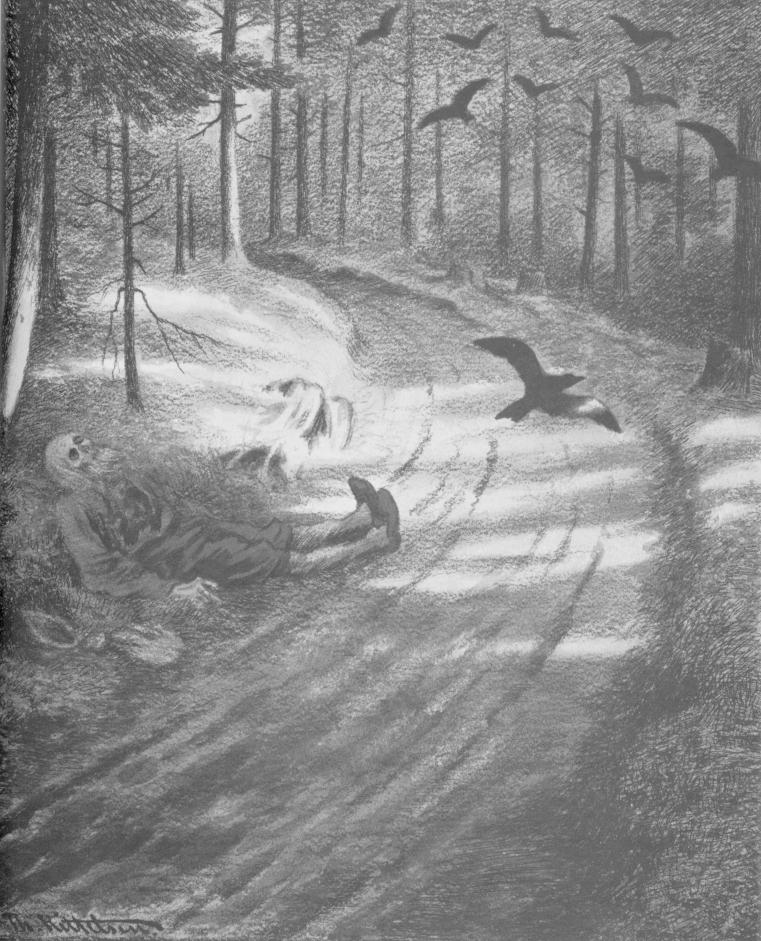
Fattigmannen, 1894–95 (The Pauper)

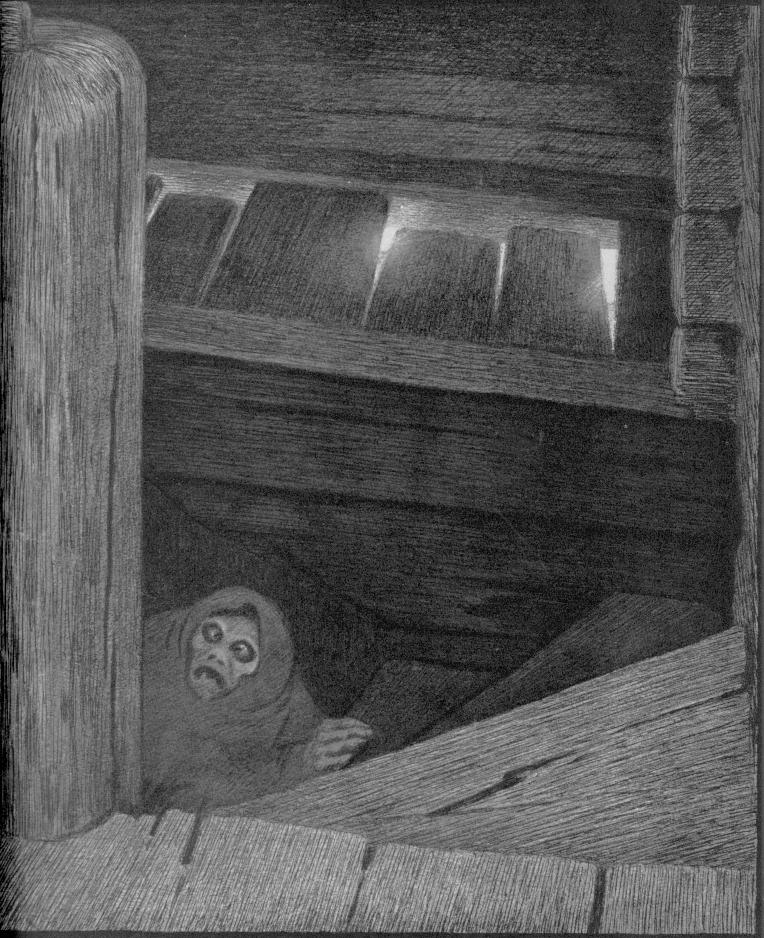
Pesta i trappen, 1896 (Plague on the Stairs)

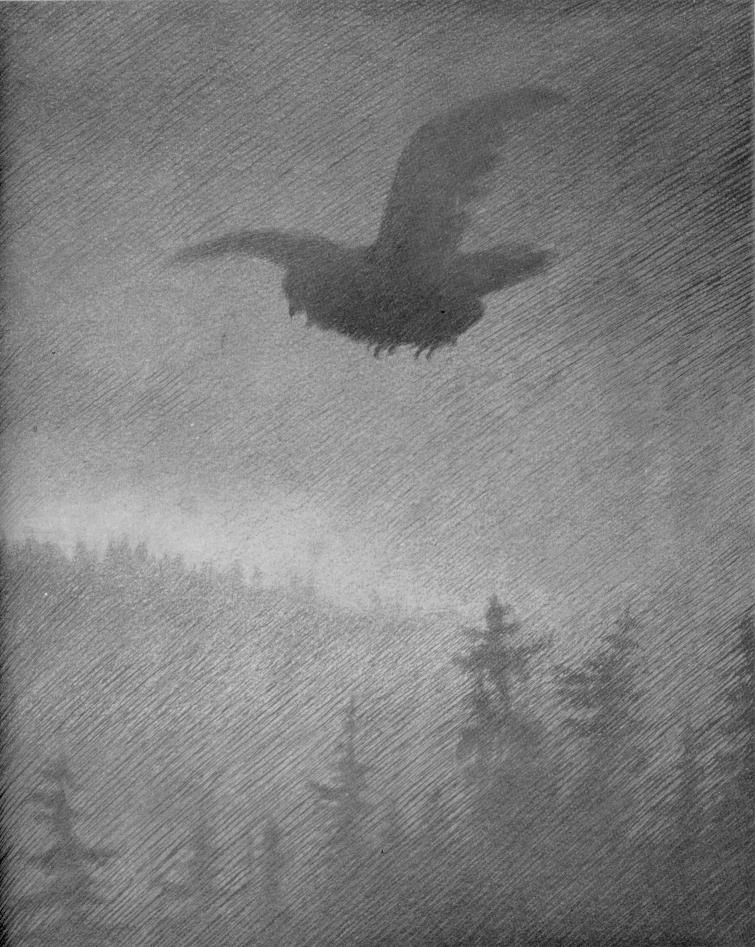
Pesta Kommer, 1894–95 (Plague's Coming)

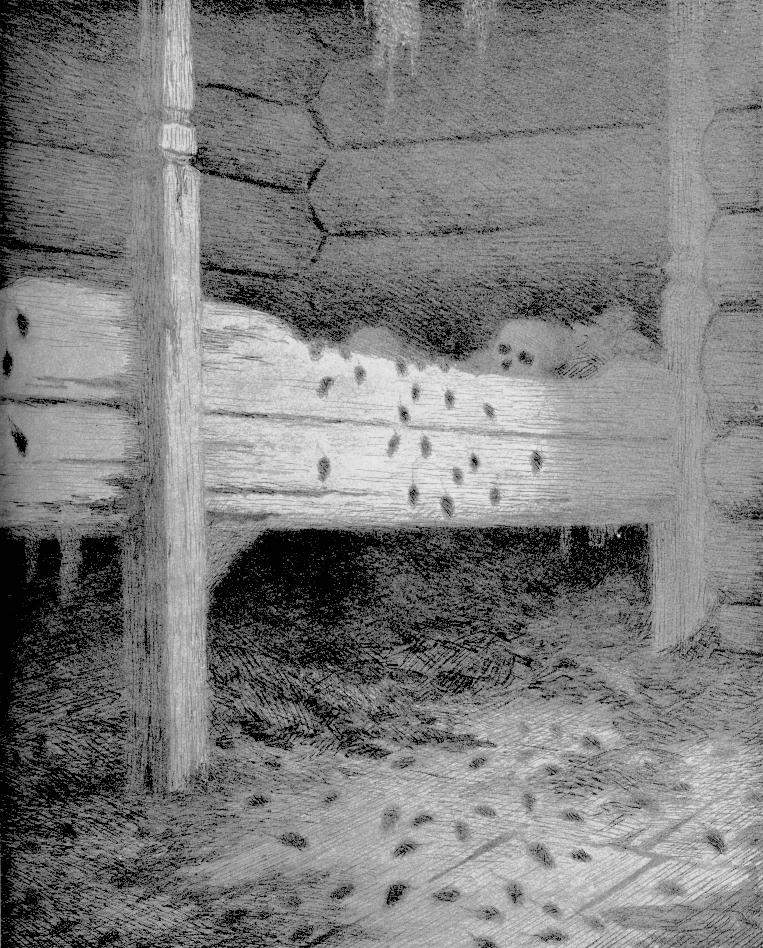
Musstad, 1896 (Mouse town)

== Bibliography ==
Books illustrated by Theodor Kittelsen:

- Fra Livet i de smaa Forholde I-II (1889–1890)
- Fra Lofoten I-II (1890–1891)
- Troldskab (1892)
- Glemmebogen (1892)
- Har dyrene Sjæl? (1894)
- Kludesamleren (1894)
- Im Thierstaate (1896)
- Ordsprog (1898)
- Svartedauen (1900)
- Billeder og Ord (1901)
- Folk og trold. Minder og drømme (1911)
- Soria Moria slot (1911)
- Løgn og forbandet digt (1912)
- Heimskringla (1914)

== Other sources ==
- Holger Koefoed (1994) Møter med Th. Kittelsen (Oslo: Gyldendal Tiden) ISBN 9788205226296
