= List of rivers of Norway =

The following are the 19 longest rivers of Norway, ranked by length:

1. Glomma, 623 km (387 mi)
2. Tana, 361 km (224 mi)
3. Pasvikelva and Ivalo, 360 km (224 mi) (109 km in Norway)
4. Numedalslågen, 356 km (221 mi)
5. Gudbrandsdalslågen and Vorma, 349 km (217 mi)
6. Drammensvassdraget or Drammenselva, 308 km (191 mi)
7. Hallingdalselva and Snarumselva, 258 km (160 mi)
8. Skiensvassdraget, 252 km (157 mi)
9. Otra, 245 km (152 mi)
10. Altaelva, 240 km (149 mi)
11. Namsen, 228 km (142 mi)
12. Arendalsvassdraget or Nidelva in Aust-Agder, 221 km (137 mi)
13. Trysilelva, 213 km (132 mi)
14. Orkla, 172 km (107 mi)
15. Vefsna, 163 km (101 mi)
16. Nea-Nidelvvassdraget or Nidelva in Trøndelag, 163 km (101 mi)
17. Karasjohka, 155 km (96 mi)
18. Gaula, 153 km (95 mi)
19. Renaelva, 152 km (94 mi)

== Other rivers ==
Other rivers include:

- Akerselva
- Eira
- Flakstadelva
- Gaula
- Tista
