= Flå =

Flå Municipality Flå kommune
- Municipality
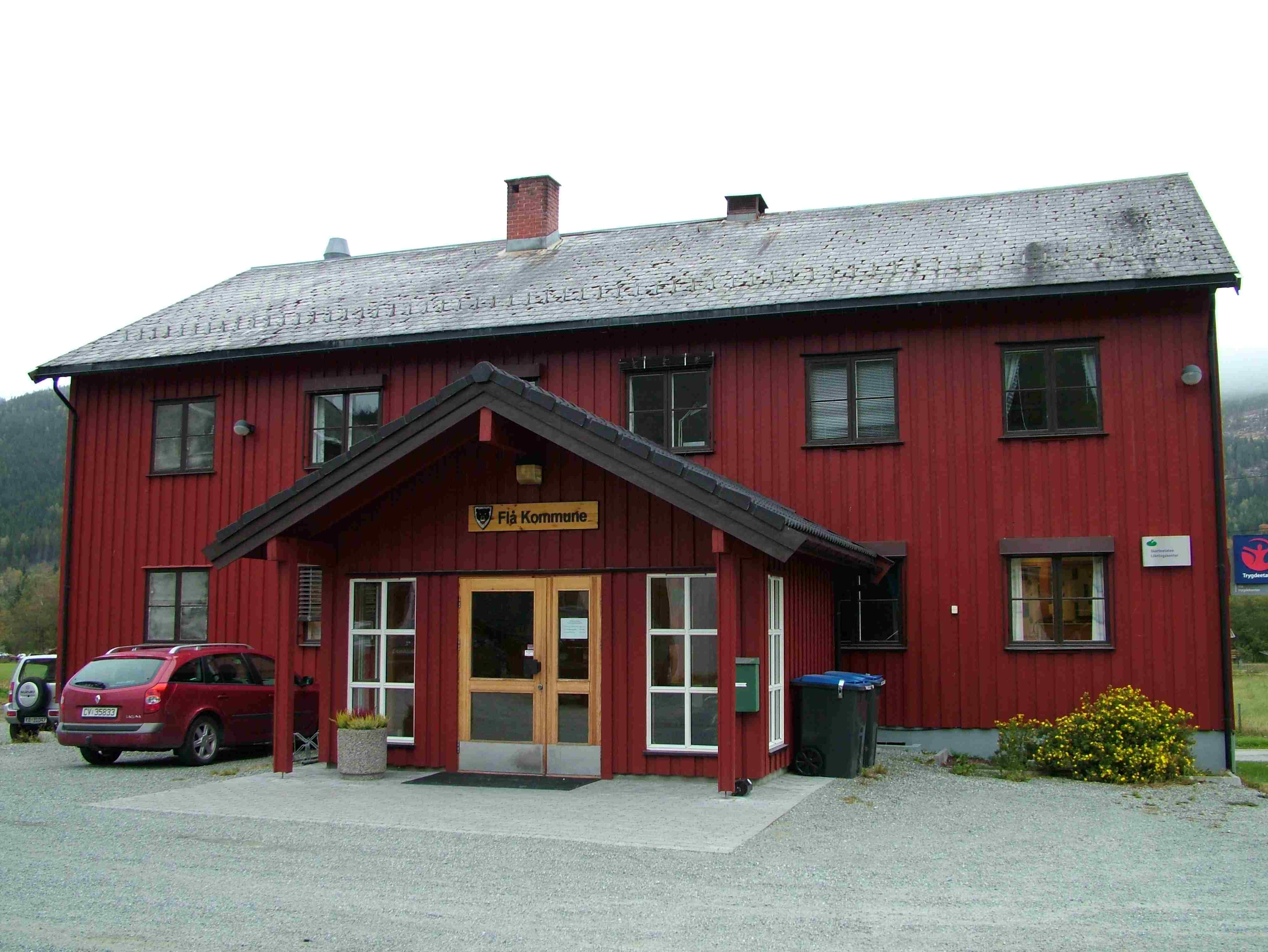
- Flå Municipality Office

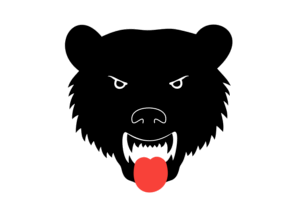
- Flag Coat of arms

- Buskerud within Norway

- Flå within Buskerud
- Coordinates: 60°24′31″N 9°29′3″E
- Country: Norway
- County: Buskerud
- District: Hallingdal
- Administrative centre: Flå

Government
  - Mayor (2003): Tor Egil Buøen (LL)

Area
  - Total: 704 km^{2} (272 sq mi)
  - Land: 670 km^{2} (260 sq mi)
  - Rank: #159 in Norway

Population (2008)
  - Total: 974
  - Rank: #405 in Norway
  - Density: 1.5/km^{2} (3.9/sq mi)
  - Change (10 years): ▼ −12.9%
- Demonym: Fløværing

Official language
  - Norwegian form: Bokmål
- Time zone: UTC+01:00 (CET)
  - Summer (DST): UTC+02:00 (CEST)
- ISO 3166 code: NO-3320
- Website: Official website

Flå is a municipality in Buskerud county, Norway. The administrative centre of the municipality is the village of Flå. The municipality of Flå was established when it was separated from Nes Municipality on 1 January 1905. The municipality lies at the most southeasterly point in the valley and traditional region of Hallingdal.

== General information ==
=== Name ===
The Old Norse form of the name was Flóða sokn (sokn means parish). This is the plural genitive case of flœð meaning "flood" (probably because flooding has been a problem for many farms in the river valley). Prior to 1921, the name was written "Flaa".

=== Coat-of-arms ===
The coat-of-arms is from modern times. They were granted on 1 March 1985. The arms show a black bear on a gray/silver background. This was chosen because there used to be many bears in the Vassfaret area. Prior to 1985, the municipality used a logo with a bear walking through the area.

Number of minorities (1st and 2nd generation) in Flå by country of origin in 2017
Ancestry	Number
Poland	28
Syria	28
Thailand	12

== History ==
Ancient routes went to Vestlandet through Valdres and Hallingdal and down Røldal to Odda. Reflecting this route, Hallingdal and its neighboring valley of Valdres in Oppland to the north were originally populated by migrants from Vestlandet and spoke a western dialect. In recognition of this, Cardinal Nicholas Breakespear, who was in Scandinavia as papal legate in 1153, included Hallingdal in the diocese of Stavanger.

== Geography ==
Flå Municipality is the southernmost municipality within Hallingdal and forms the gateway to Hallingdal from the south. Flå Municipality is bordered in the north by Sør-Aurdal Municipality, in the east by Ringerike Municipality, in the south by Krødsherad Municipality and Sigdal Municipality, in the west by Nore og Uvdal Municipality, and in the northwest by Nesbyen Municipality. Travelers from the south pass through the 65-metre (213 ft) long Hallingporten tunnel on Norwegian National Road 7 (Riksvei 7) just located north of Gulsvik.

Vassfaret is a forested mountain valley bordering Flå. The Norefjell mountain range also includes parts of Flå Municipality as well as Nesbyen Municipality, Ringerike Municipality, and Sør-Aurdal Municipality. Lake Krøderen (Krøderfjord) stretches about 41 km north from the village of Krøderen and reaches to Gulsvik. The Hallingdalselva river flows into the lake from the north. The area includes the Vassfaret and Vidalen Conservation area which includes Festningen Nature Reserve and Bukollen Nature Reserve as well as the Inner Vassfaret Conservation area which includes Bringen Nature Reserve. .

=== Climate ===
Climate data for Gulsvik II 1991–2020 (142 m, avg high/low 2008-2025)
Month	Jan	Feb	Mar	Apr	May	Jun	Jul	Aug	Sep	Oct	Nov	Dec	Year
Mean daily maximum °C (°F)	−2.4 (27.7)	0.3 (32.5)	6.3 (43.3)	12.2 (54.0)	17.9 (64.2)	22.2 (72.0)	23.9 (75.0)	21.2 (70.2)	16.8 (62.2)	9.5 (49.1)	3.2 (37.8)	−1.7 (28.9)	10.8 (51.4)
Daily mean °C (°F)	−5.2 (22.6)	−4.2 (24.4)	0 (32)	5 (41)	10.2 (50.4)	14.7 (58.5)	17.1 (62.8)	15.3 (59.5)	11.1 (52.0)	5 (41)	0 (32)	−4.4 (24.1)	5.4 (41.7)
Mean daily minimum °C (°F)	−9.2 (15.4)	−7.7 (18.1)	−3.8 (25.2)	0.2 (32.4)	5 (41)	9.9 (49.8)	12.2 (54.0)	10.7 (51.3)	7.5 (45.5)	2.4 (36.3)	−2 (28)	−7.5 (18.5)	1.5 (34.6)
Average precipitation mm (inches)	61.5 (2.42)	38.4 (1.51)	40.3 (1.59)	44.3 (1.74)	65.6 (2.58)	73.7 (2.90)	94.4 (3.72)	102.6 (4.04)	78 (3.1)	89.7 (3.53)	83.6 (3.29)	52.7 (2.07)	824.8 (32.49)
Average precipitation days (≥ 1.0 mm)	9	7	7	7	8	9	11	11	8	10	10	9	106
Source 1: NOAA
Source 2: Seklima (avg highs/lows)

== Notable people ==
- Kolbjørn Buøen (1895–1975) a Norwegian actor
- Fredrik Gulsvik (born 1989) a Norwegian former footballer with over 100 club caps

== Attractions ==
Bjørneparken is located on Vikberget in Flå. The park is a sanctuary featuring various animals including bears, elk, deer, wolf, and lynx.

== Protected areas ==
- Bringen Nature Reserve, established 28 June 1985
- Bukollen Nature Reserve, established 28 June 1985
- Festningen Nature Reserve, established 28 June 1985
- Flenten Nature Reserve, established 24 September 1993
- Stavnselva Nature Reserve, established 13 December 2002

== See also ==
- Protected areas of Norway

== Gallery ==
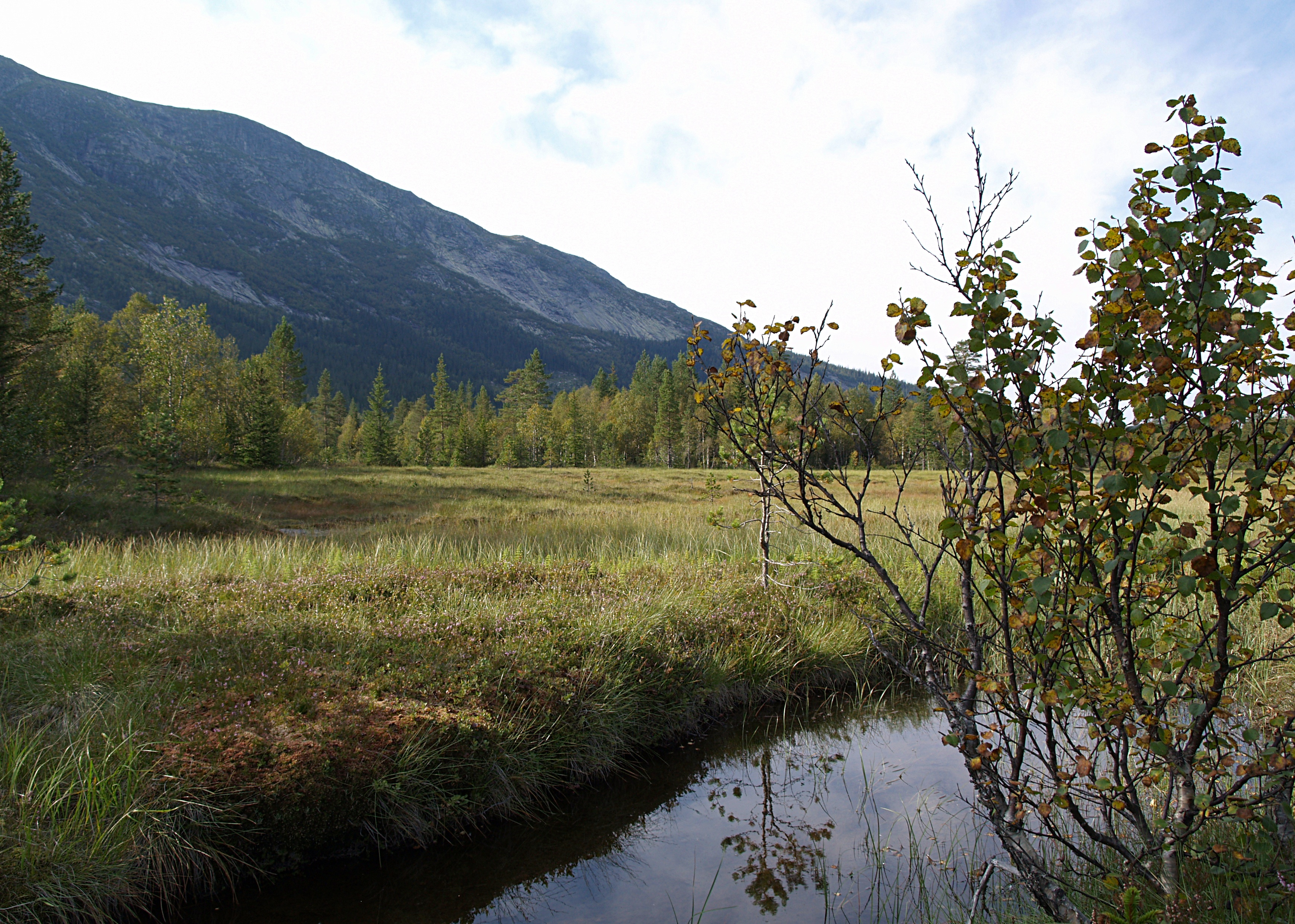
Vidalen

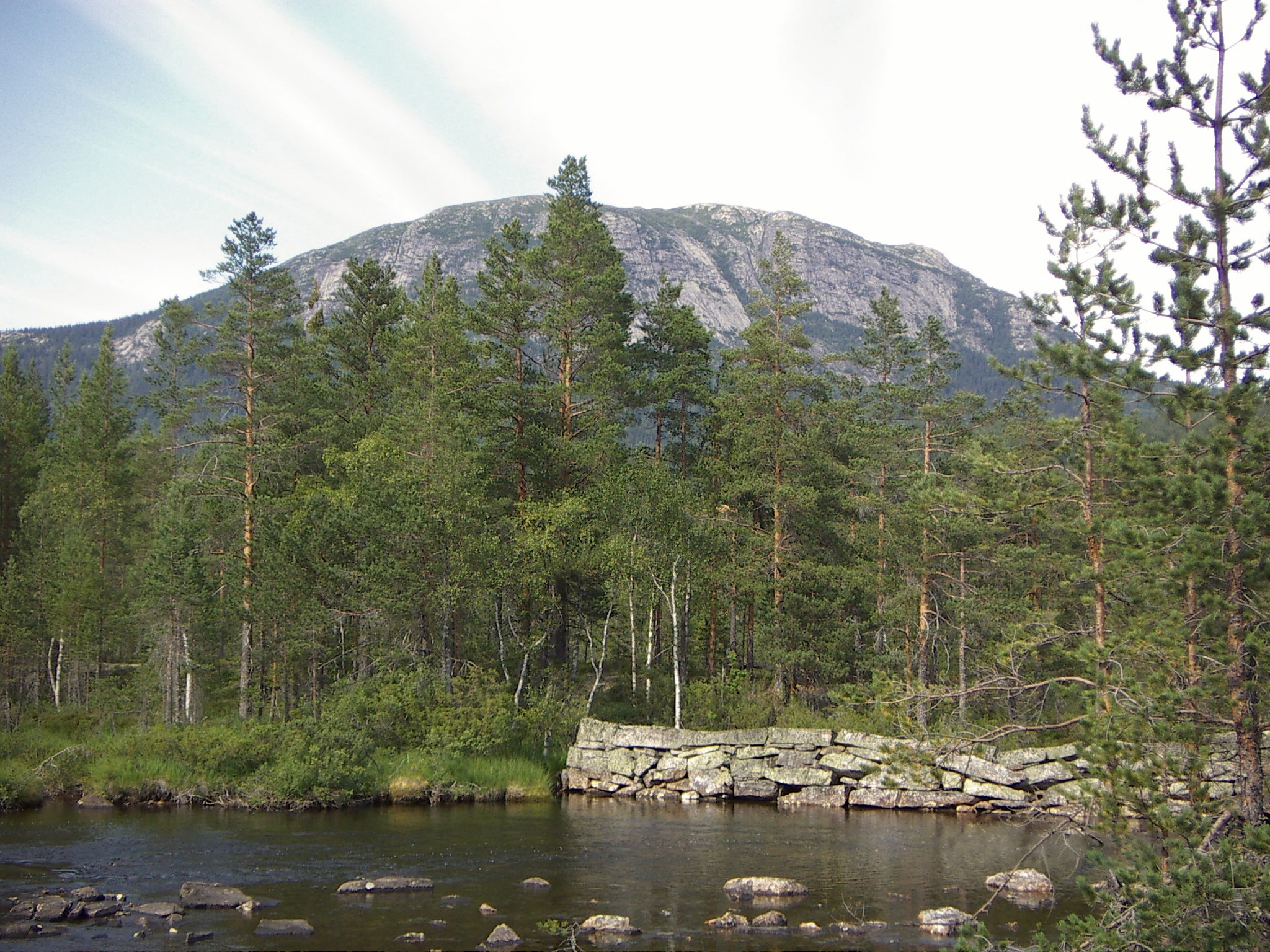
Bukollen

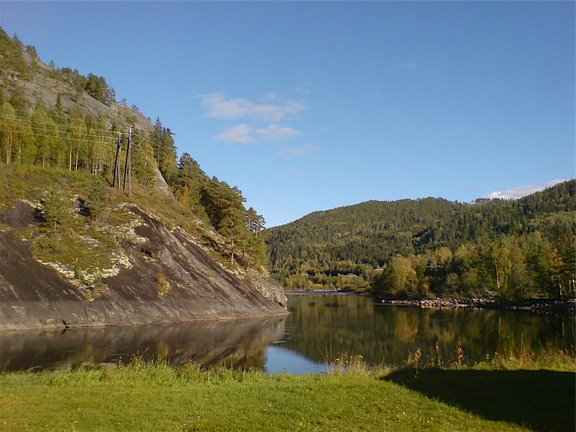
Stavnselva

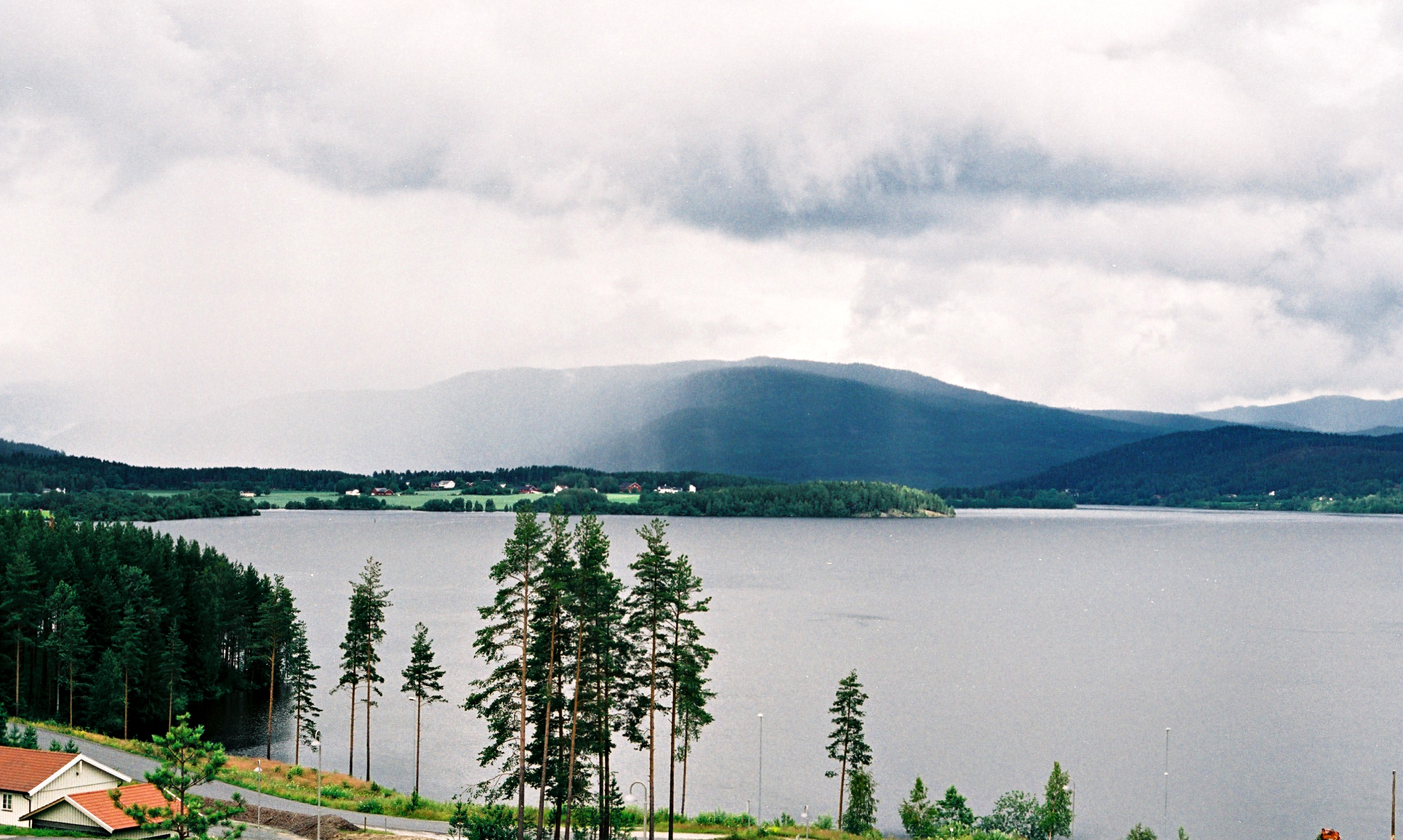
Lake Krøderen

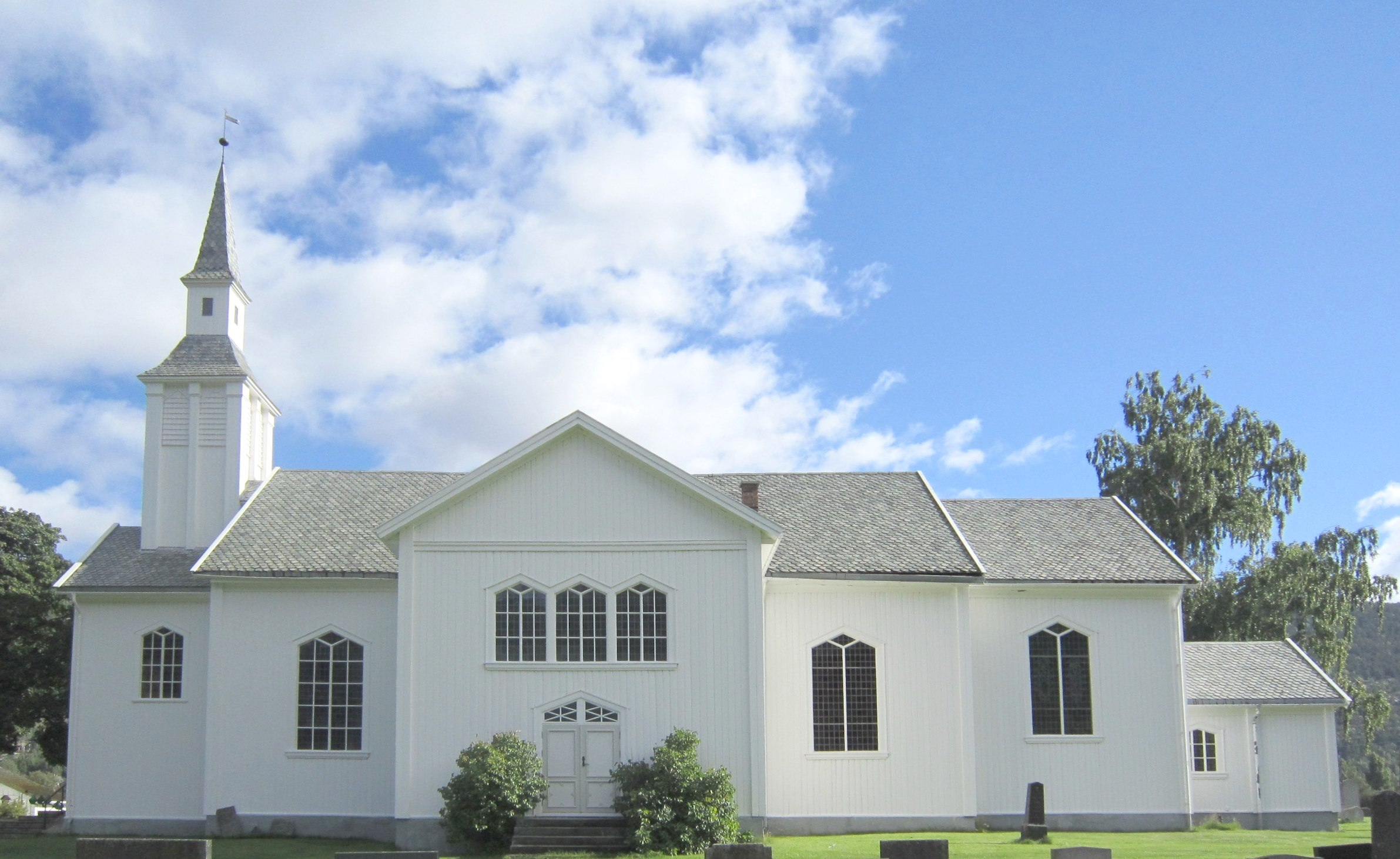
Flå Church

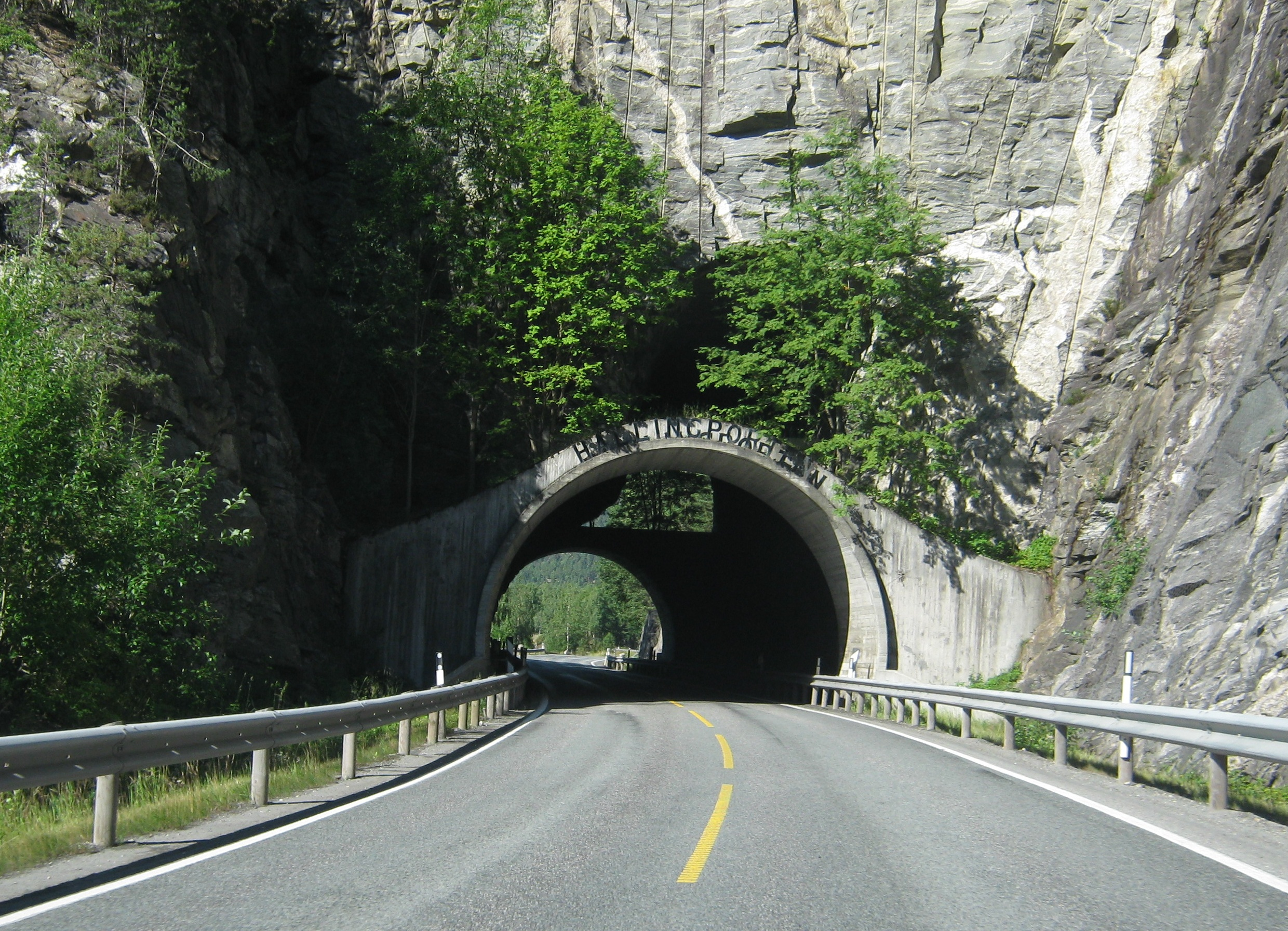
Hallingporten road tunnel

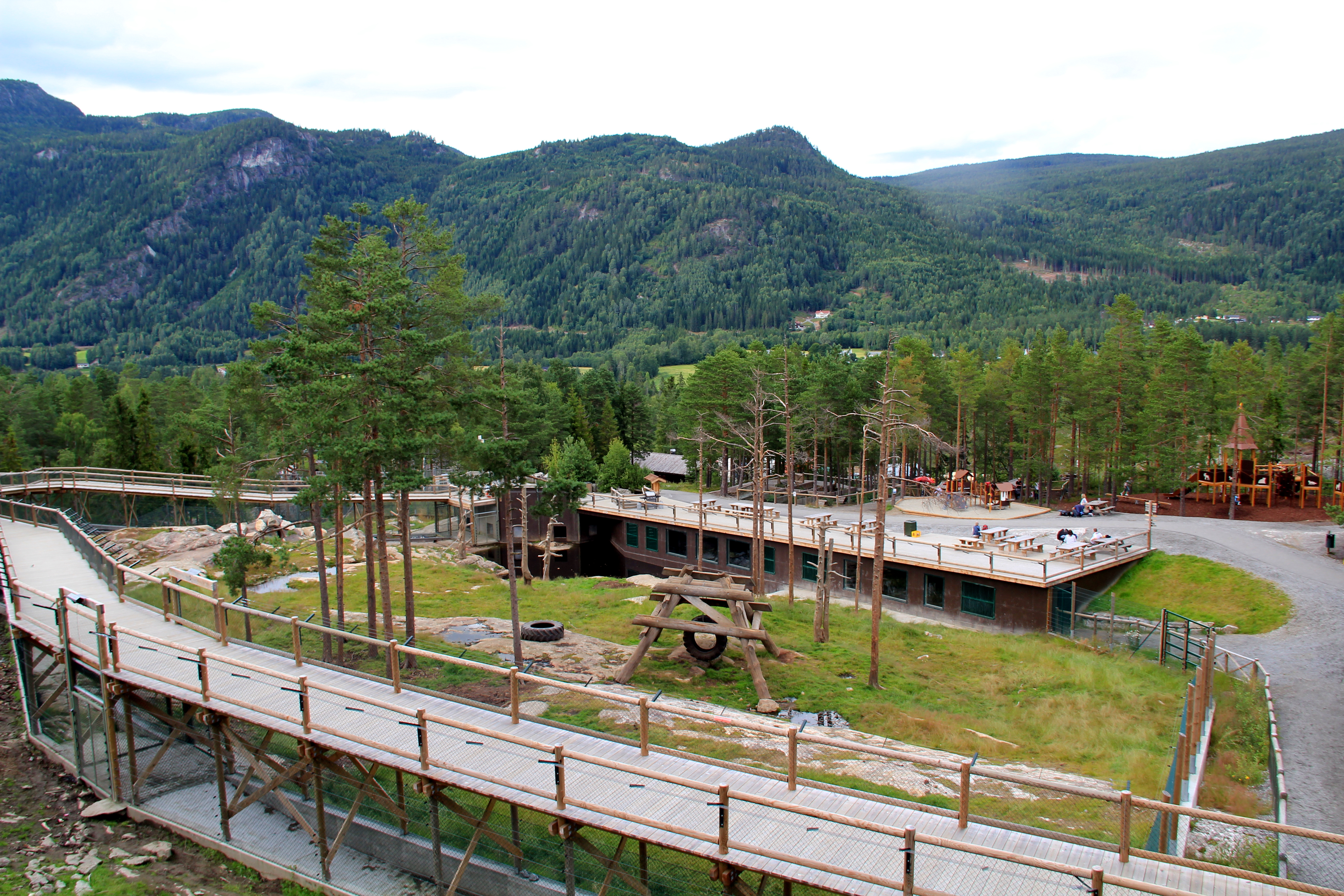
Bjørneparken
