= Flå Church, Buskerud =

Church in Buskerud, Norway

Flå Church
- Flå kirke
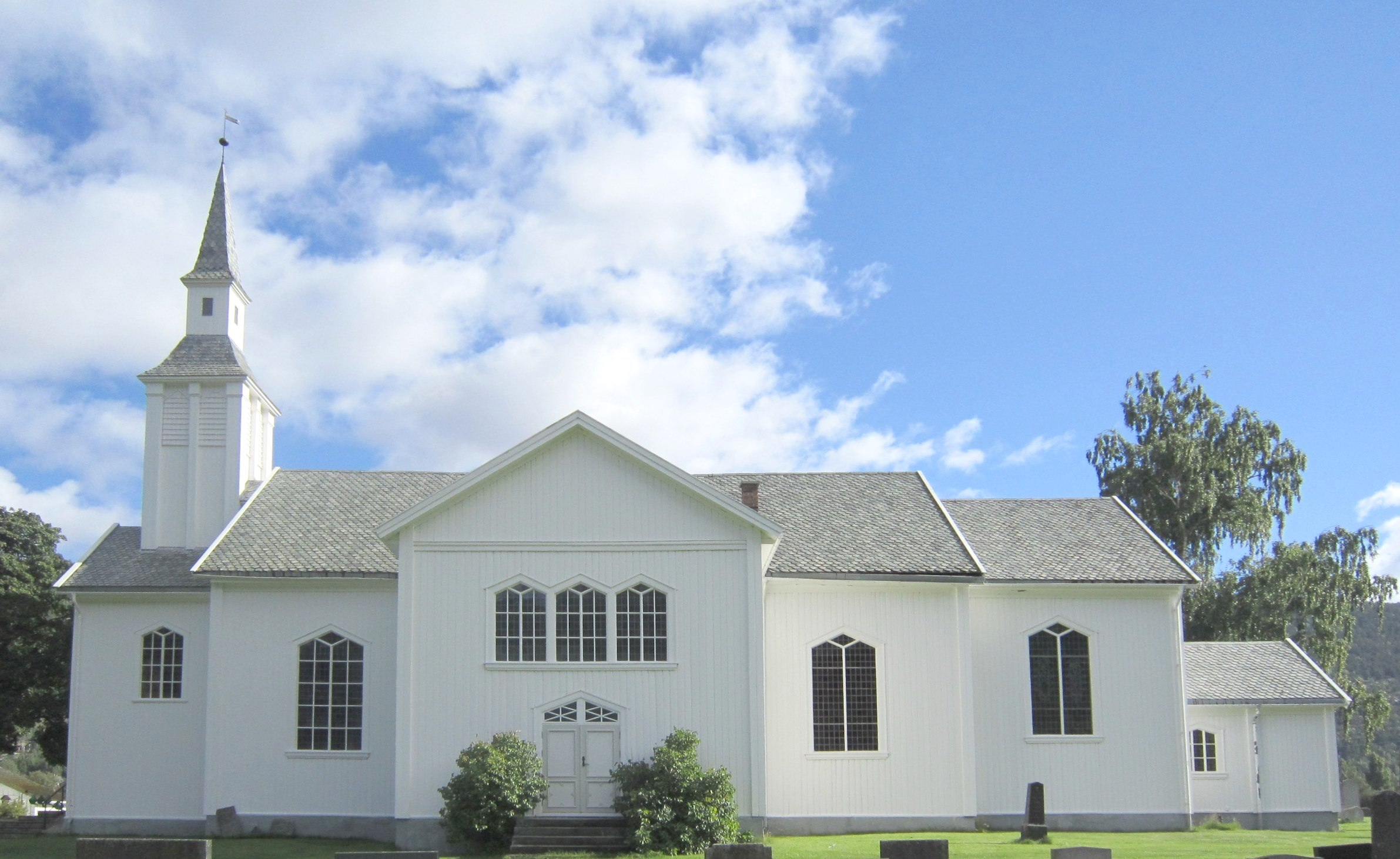
- View of the church
- Flå Church
- 60°25′42″N 9°27′58″E
- Location: Flå Municipality, Buskerud
- Country: Norway
- Denomination: Church of Norway
- Previous denomination: Catholic Church
- Churchmanship: Evangelical Lutheran

History
- Status: Parish church
- Founded: 12th century
- Consecrated: 15 Sept 1858

Architecture
- Functional status: Active
- Architect: Christian Grosch
- Architectural type: Cruciform
- Completed: 1858 (168 years ago)

Specifications
- Capacity: 350
- Materials: Wood

Administration
- Diocese: Tunsberg
- Deanery: Hallingdal prosti
- Parish: Flå
- Norwegian Cultural Heritage Site
- Type: Church
- Status: Listed
- ID: 84170

Flå Church (Norwegian: Flå kirke) is a parish church of the Church of Norway in Flå Municipality in Buskerud county, Norway. It is located in the village of Flå. It is the church for the Flå parish which is part of the Hallingdal prosti (deanery) in the Diocese of Tunsberg. The white, wooden church was built in a cruciform design in 1858 using plans drawn up by the architect Christian Heinrich Grosch. The church seats about 350 people.

== History ==
The earliest existing historical records of the church date back to the year 1499, but the church was not built that year. The first church in Flå was a wooden stave church that was likely built around the year 1200 on a site about 500 metres (0.31 mi) east of the present church site. It sat on the eastern shore of the river Hallingdalselva. The church had a rectangular nave and a narrower choir with an apse. The nave was about 6.55 metres (21.5 ft) long and about 5.25 metres (17.2 ft) wide. In 1685, the apse and the east wall of the choir and the exterior open-air passageway that surrounded it were demolished, and the choir was extended eastwards. The old choir was demolished in 1707, and the church was rebuilt as a cruciform church and given a new choir. The church, like most other churches in Norway, was sold into private ownership during the Norwegian church sale in 1723 to help the King pay off war debts. The church was sold to the people of the parish in 1816.

The church was located along the Hallingdalselva river, and due to its close proximity to the river, there were a number of issues over the years, both with the foundation of the building and with the graves surrounding the church. Over time, the river had eroded the land so that the river bank continued to get closer and closer to the building. Due to this, in 1838, the parish requested permission from the government to build a new church on the other side of the river about 500 metres (1,600 ft) to the west, in the village of Flå. In 1854, permission was finally granted to build the new church. The new church was designed by Christian Grosch and it was built by master carpenter Hansen in 1858. The new church was consecrated by the bishop on 15 September 1858. It was a wooden cruciform building that is surrounded by a graveyard. The church was built with the choir to the south and the main entrance to the nave to the north. It consists of a long and wide main nave. In the middle of each of the long walls there are narrower, short cross arms with a gable. There is a small sacristy off the south end of the choir. The old church was torn down the following spring and in 1879, the area where the old church and graveyard stood was cleared and converted to farmland.

== Media gallery ==
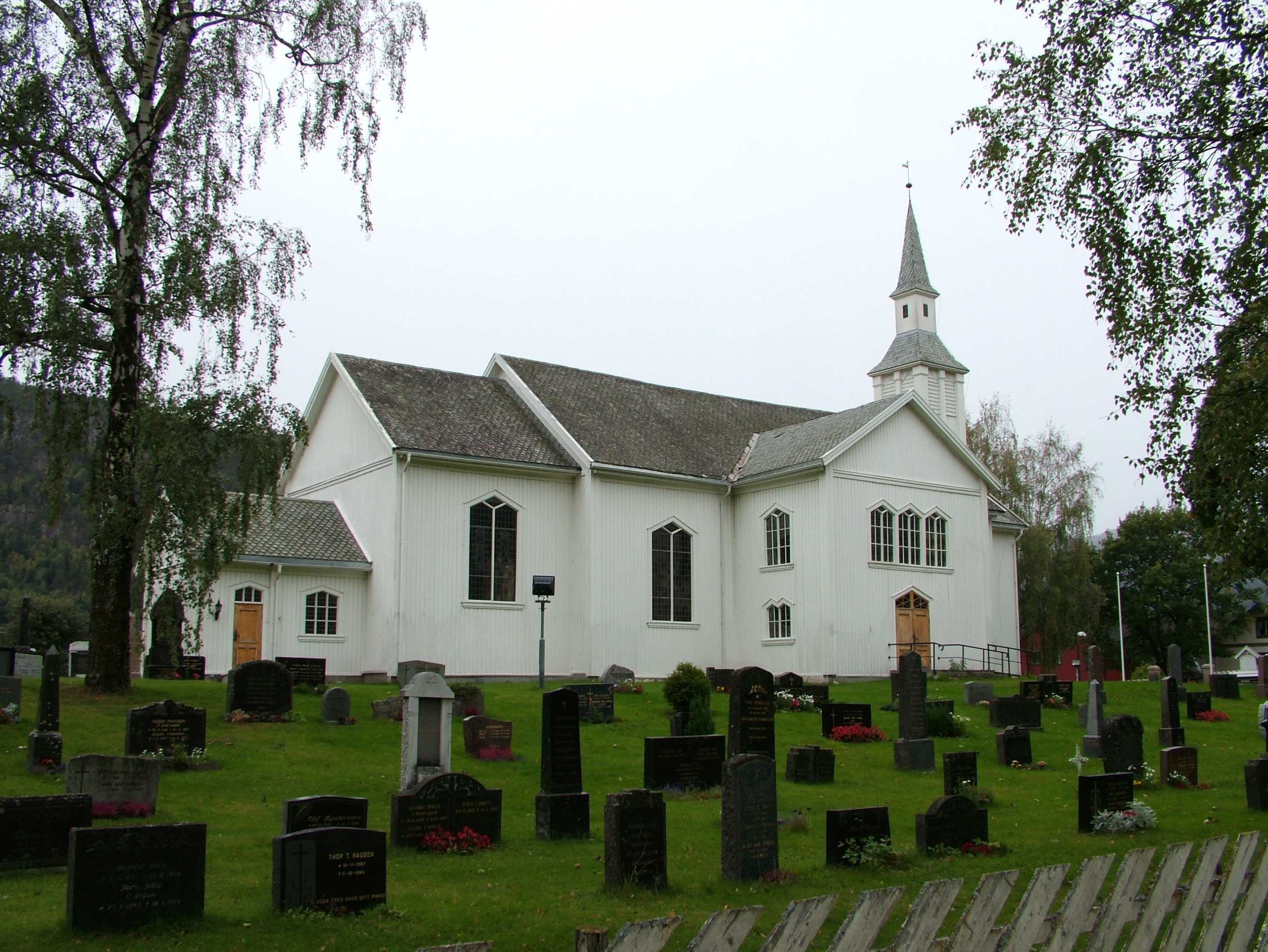

Old stave church

== See also ==
- List of churches in Tunsberg
