= Krøderen (village) =

Coordinates: 60°09′N 9°49′E

- Village
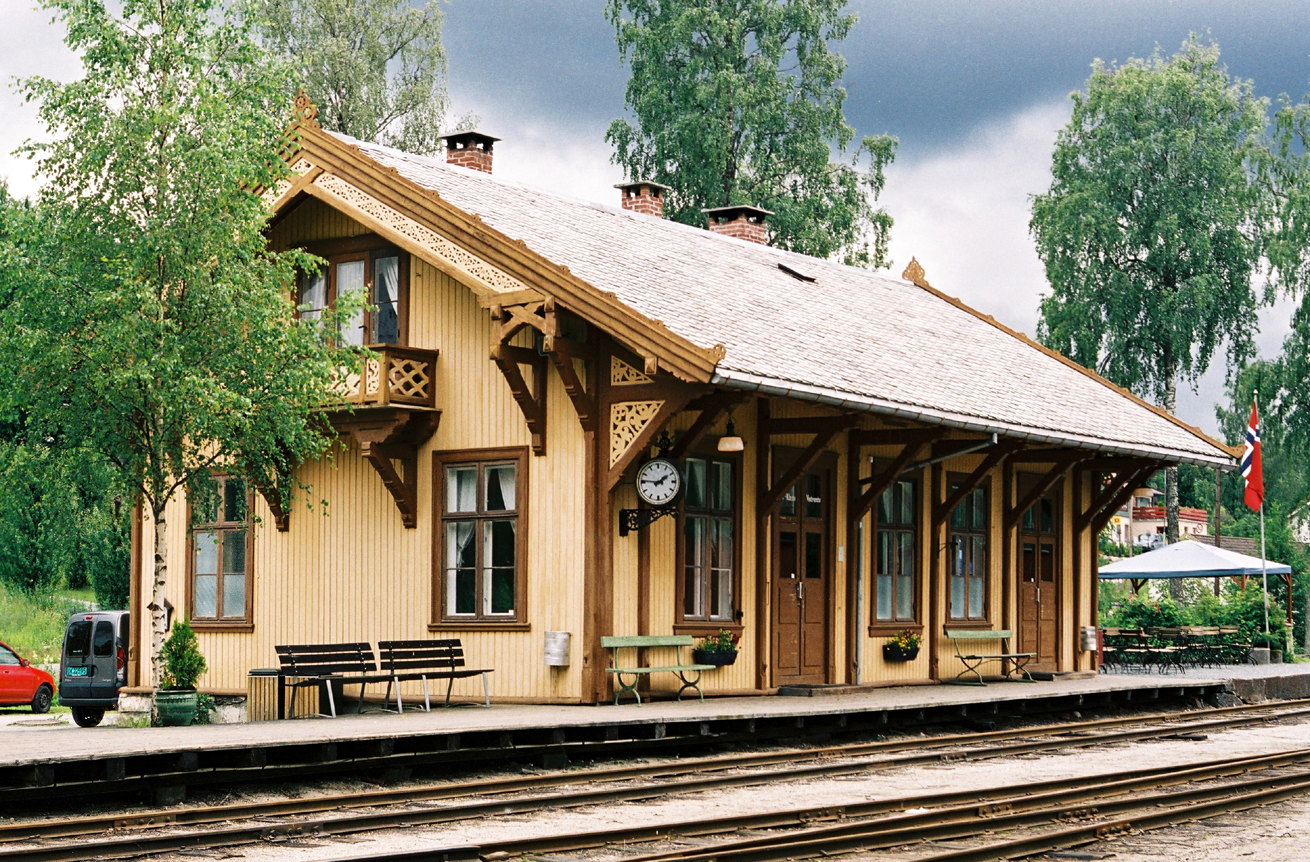
- Krøderen Rail Station
- Interactive map of Krøderen
- Country: Norway
- Region: Østlandet
- County: Buskerud
- Municipality: Krødsherad
- Time zone: UTC+01:00 (CET)
  - Summer (DST): UTC+02:00 (CEST)
- Post Code: 3535

Krøderen is a village in Krødsherad, Buskerud, Norway.

The village of Krøderen is located at the point where Snarumselva drains out of the south end of Lake Krøderen. Krøderen is approximately 100 km northwest of Oslo. Norwegian county road Fylkesvei 285 (Fv285) passes through the village, providing the shortest link between Hallingdal and Drammen.

Since 1872, Krøderen Rail Station has been the terminus of the Krøder Line. Today this is a popular heritage railway which runs between Vikersund and Krøderen, a distance of about 26 km.
