= Høgevarde =

Mountain in Norway

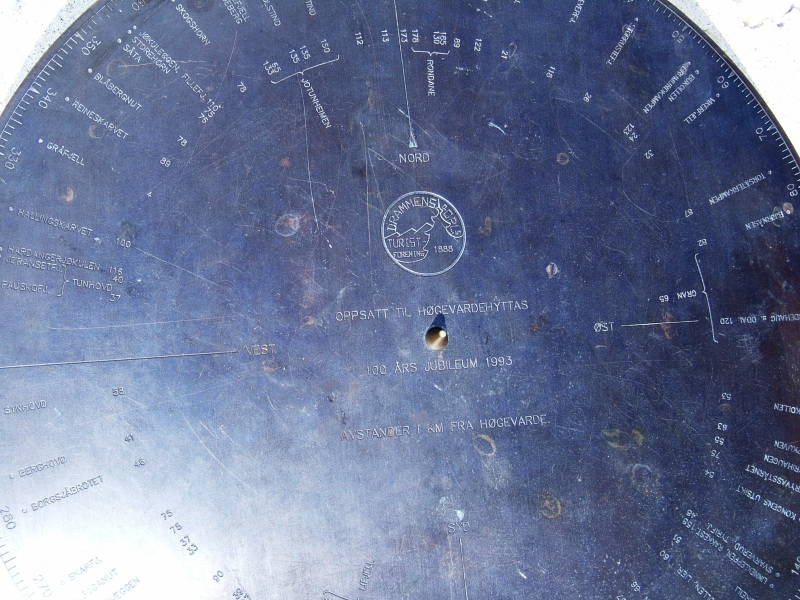
- Aiming plate at the summit

Highest point
- Elevation: 1,459 m (4,787 ft)
- Prominence: 209 m (686 ft)
- Isolation: 4.5 to 4.7 km (2.8 to 2.9 mi)
- Coordinates: 60°17′26.50″N 9°27′31.75″E

Geography
- Location: Krødsherad, Buskerud, Norway
- Parent range: Norefjell

Høgevarde or Høgevard is the second highest peak (1,459 metres, 4,787 feet) on the Norefjell mountain range and the highest point in the municipality of Krødsherad in Buskerud, Norway. It is known for its vast view of an estimated 40,000 km^{2} (15,000 sq mi) over eastern Norway. At the top there is an iron plate giving names and directions to mountains along the horizon. Near the peak is Høgevardehytta, a self-service cabin maintained by the DNT (Den Norske Turistforening).
