= Norefjell =

Mountain in Norway

Coordinates: 60°16′N 9°29′E

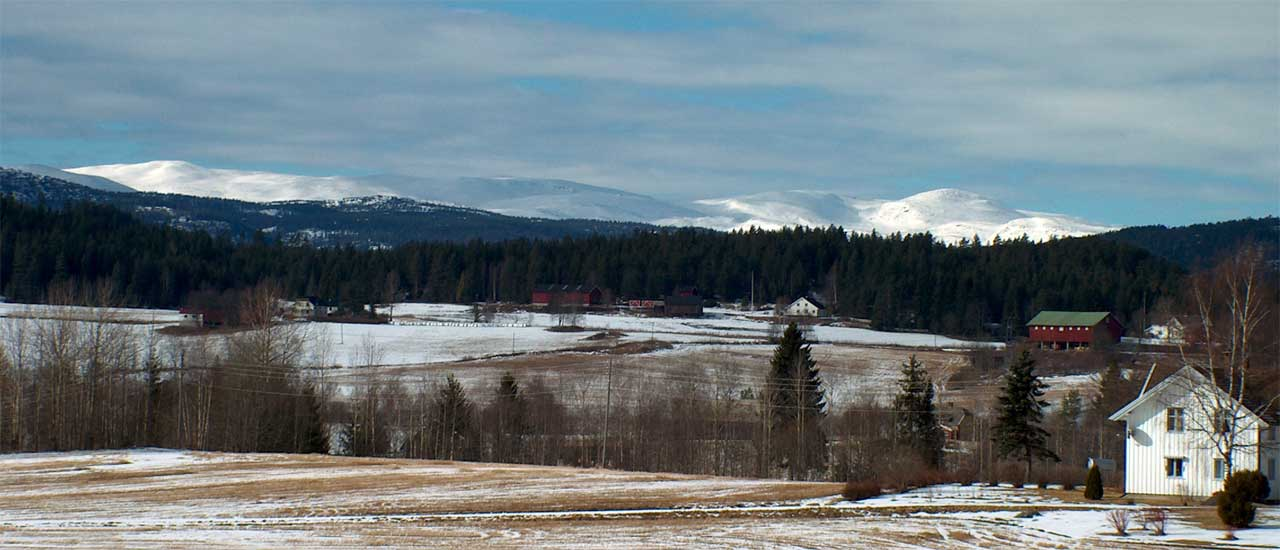
Norefjell seen from Sokna in Ringerike

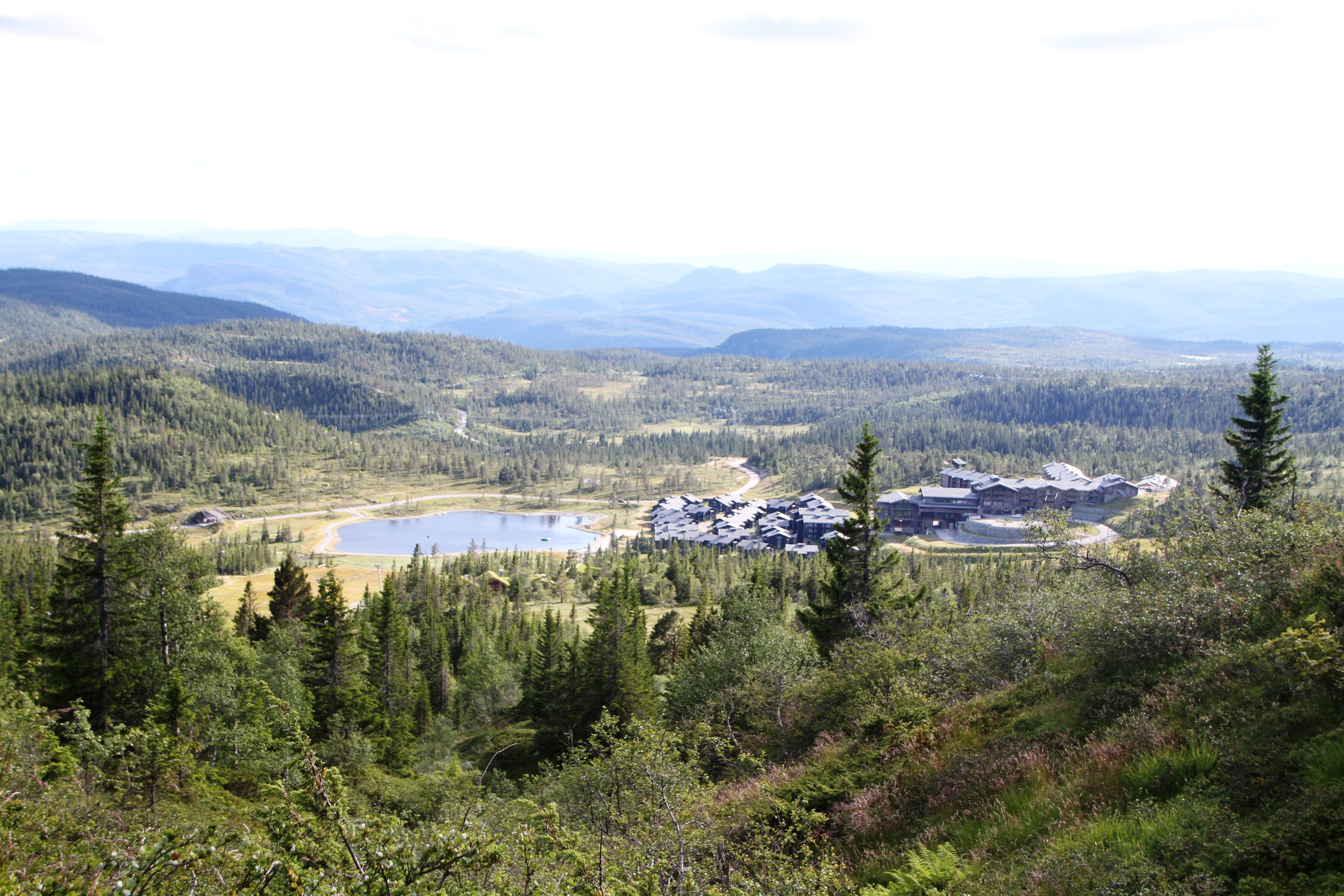
Norefjell Ski Resort and Krøderen

Norefjell is a mountain range in the Scandes Mountains system in Norway. It stretches between the valleys of Eggedal (west) and Hallingdal (east). It covers parts of the municipalities Flå, Sigdal, and Krødsherad, all in the county Buskerud.

The highest peaks within the mountain range are:

- Gråfjell, 1,468 m (4,816 ft)
- Høgevarde, 1,459 m (4,787 ft)

Norefjell Ski Resort is an alpine ski resort located in the municipality Krødsherad. It is about one and a half hours drive north of Oslo. Norefjell was host to the downhill and giant slalom competitions of the 1952 Winter Olympics.

The Norefjell mountain range is named after the old farm Nore (see Noresund). The last element is fjell meaning 'mountain'.

== See also ==
- "Theme from Norefjell", an electronic instrumental composition by DJ Tiësto
