= Fredrik Gulsvik =

Norwegian footballer (born 1989)

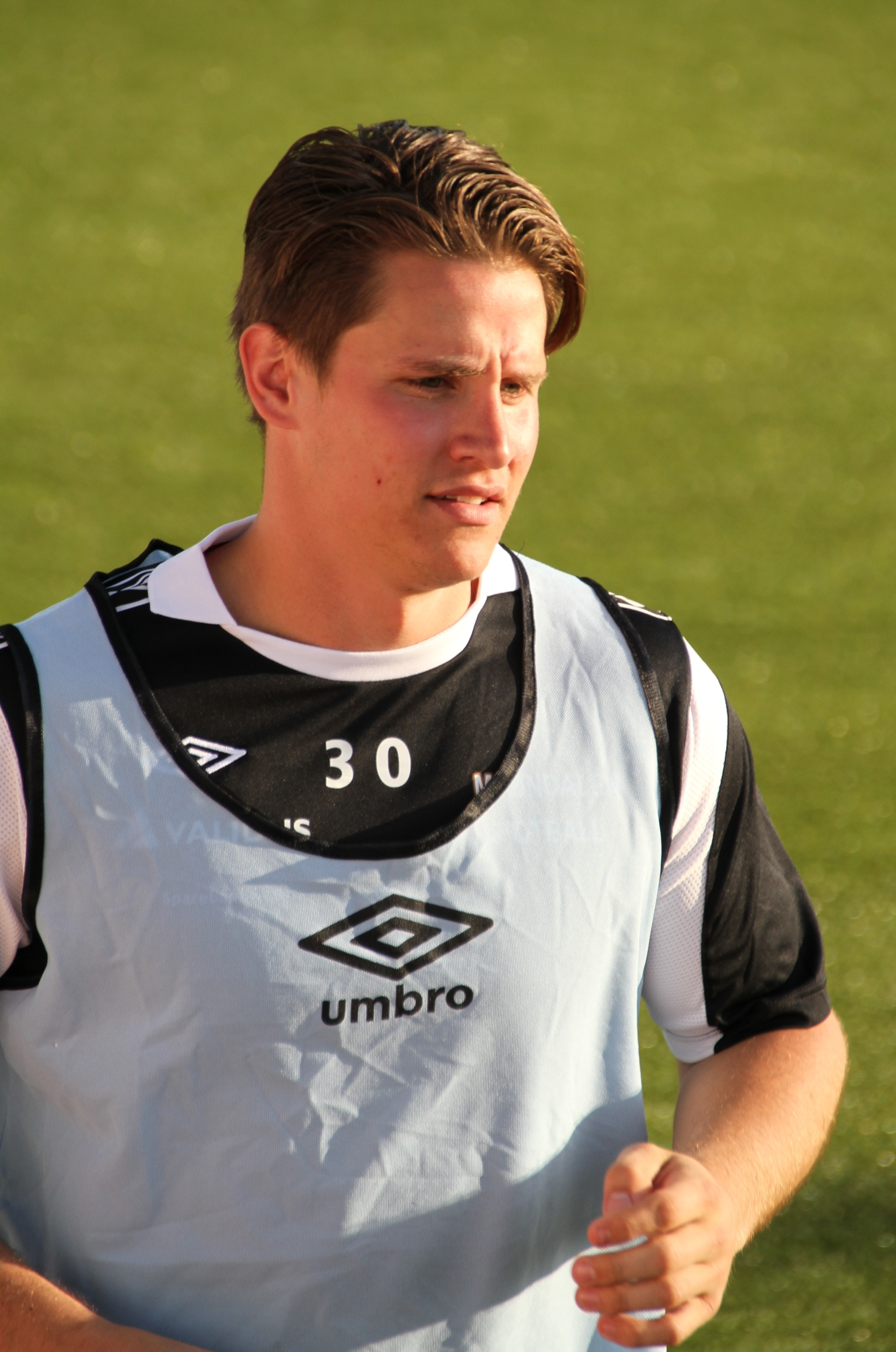

Personal information
- Full name: Fredrik Gulsvik
- Date of birth: 29 August 1989 (age 37)
- Place of birth: Flå, Norway
- Height: 1.90 m (6 ft 3 in)
- Position: Forward

Team information
- Current team: Simensbråten

Youth career
- Flå
- Las Palmas
- Maspalomas

Senior career*
Years	Team	Apps	(Gls)
2007–2010	Odd Grenland	72	(13)
2010–2011	Sandefjord	24	(3)
2011–2012	Mjøndalen	8	(1)
2012	Funnefoss/Vormsund	6	(1)
2013	Fjellhamar	10	(4)
2014–	Simensbråten		

International career^{‡}
2005–	Norway U-16/U-17/U-18/U-19		
- * Club domestic league appearances and goals as of 19 July 2012 ‡ National team caps and goals as of 29 June 2008

Fredrik Gulsvik (born 29 August 1989) is a Norwegian former footballer. He played in Tippeligaen with Odd Grenland and Sandefjord, in addition to Mjøndalen before he decided to retire at the age of 22.

== Club career ==
Gulsvik was born in Flå and began his career with local side Flå before he transferred to Spanish club UD Las Palmas. Accompanied by his mother and sister, Gulsvik stayed in Spain for four years, playing for Las Palmas and CD Maspalomas. He signed a three-year contract with Odd Grenland in 2007, then in the Tippeligaen, and was considered by the club to be one of their more promising players. He played for Odd's junior side until the club promoted Gulsvik to the senior team after he impressed his manager while training in Cyprus. He debuted in a 2-1 defeat to Strømsgodset on 9 April 2007.

He became noted for possessing a powerful shot. In his inaugural season, Gulsvik converted a long-range strike against Lyn which was named goal of the year for 2007. His assistant manager, Morten Rønningen, compared him to John Carew and remarked positively on his strength and pace. Gulsvik acquired the nickname "Super-Mac" in reference to a character that appeared in the magazine Buster.

After some time at Sandefjord, Gulsvik joined Mjøndalen IF in 2011. He scored on debut for Mjøndalen, but that was also his only goal for the club. In July 2012 he decided to retire from professional football. He did, however, continue to play football in the lower leagues, and the last team he played on was the 6th Division club Simensbråten as of 2015. In 2016 he was arrested for being in possession of cocaine at a club in Oslo.

== Personal life ==
On 13 January 2024, Gulsvik smuggled 16 kg of cocaine from the Netherlands to Norway. This was due to the fact that he had been struggling with gambling debt for many years. He was investigated by the Norwegian police. Gulsvik has been linked to the criminal underworld and to a known convicted felon and accomplice, Marius Borg Høiby, son of Crown Princess Mette-Marit.

== International career ==
Gulsvik represented the Norwegian Football Team at the U-16, U-17, U-18, and U-19 levels, scoring his first goal in a 3-1 defeat of Portugal's U-18s.

== Career statistics ==
Season	Club	Division	League		Cup		Total	
Season	Club	Division	Apps	Goals	Apps	Goals	Apps	Goals
2007	Odd Grenland	Tippeligaen	21	3	6	2	27	5
2008	Odd Grenland	Adeccoligaen	23	6	3	0	26	6
2009	Odd Grenland	Tippeligaen	20	3	5	1	25	4
2010	Odd Grenland	Tippeligaen	8	1	3	2	11	3
2010	Sandefjord	Tippeligaen	9	1	0	0	9	1
2011	Sandefjord	Adeccoligaen	15	2	2	1	17	3
2011	Mjøndalen	Adeccoligaen	8	1	0	0	8	1
2012	Mjøndalen	Adeccoligaen	0	0	0	0	0	0
2012	Funnefoss/Vormsund	3. divisjon	6	1	0	0	6	1
2013	Fjellhamar	3. divisjon	10	4	0	0	10	4
2014	Simensbråten	6. Divisjon	15	14	0	0	15	14
Career Total			120	22	19	6	139	28
