= Noresund =

Village in Krødsherad Municipality, Norway

Coordinates: 60°10′N 9°37′E

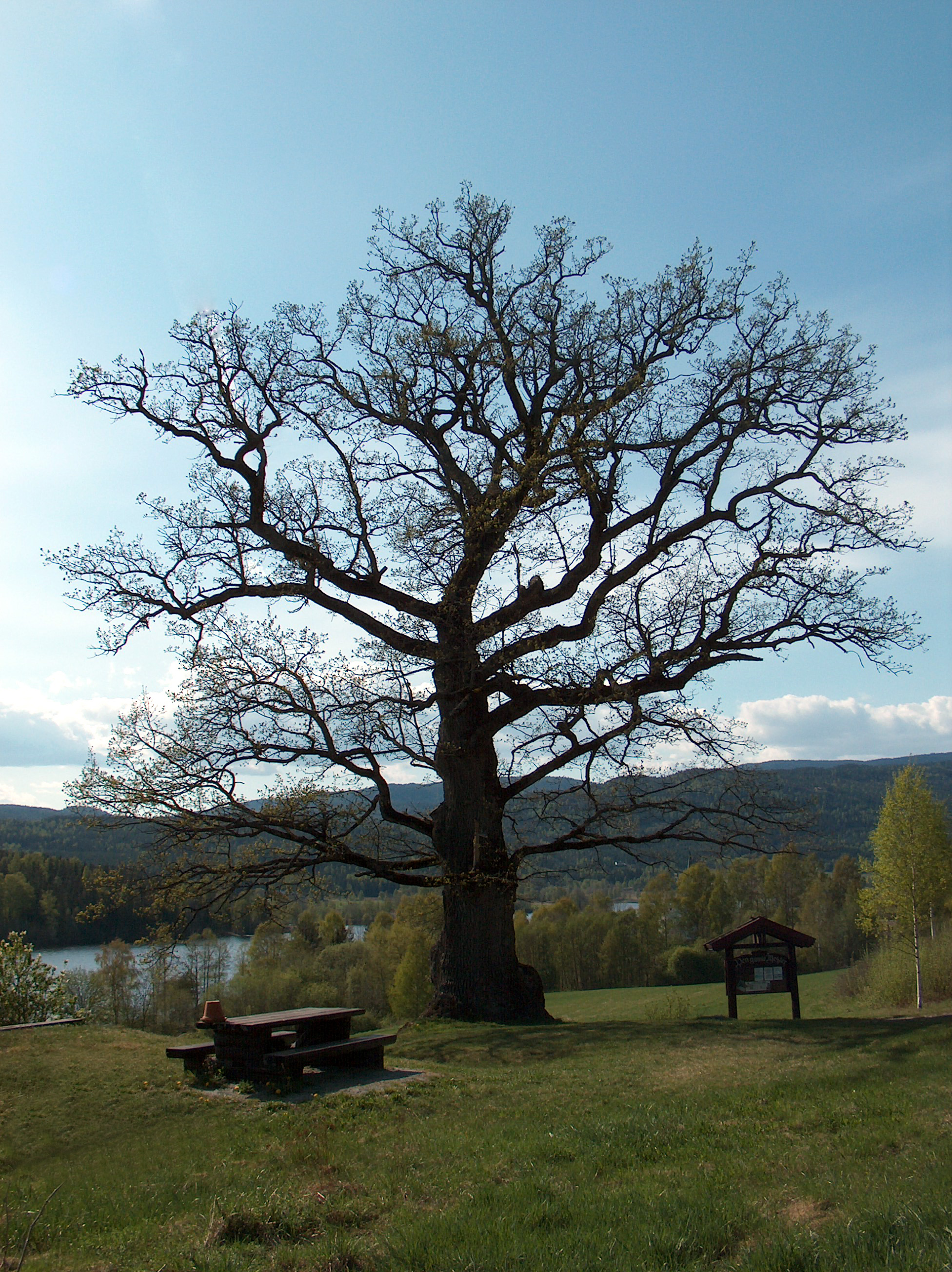
The Old Master

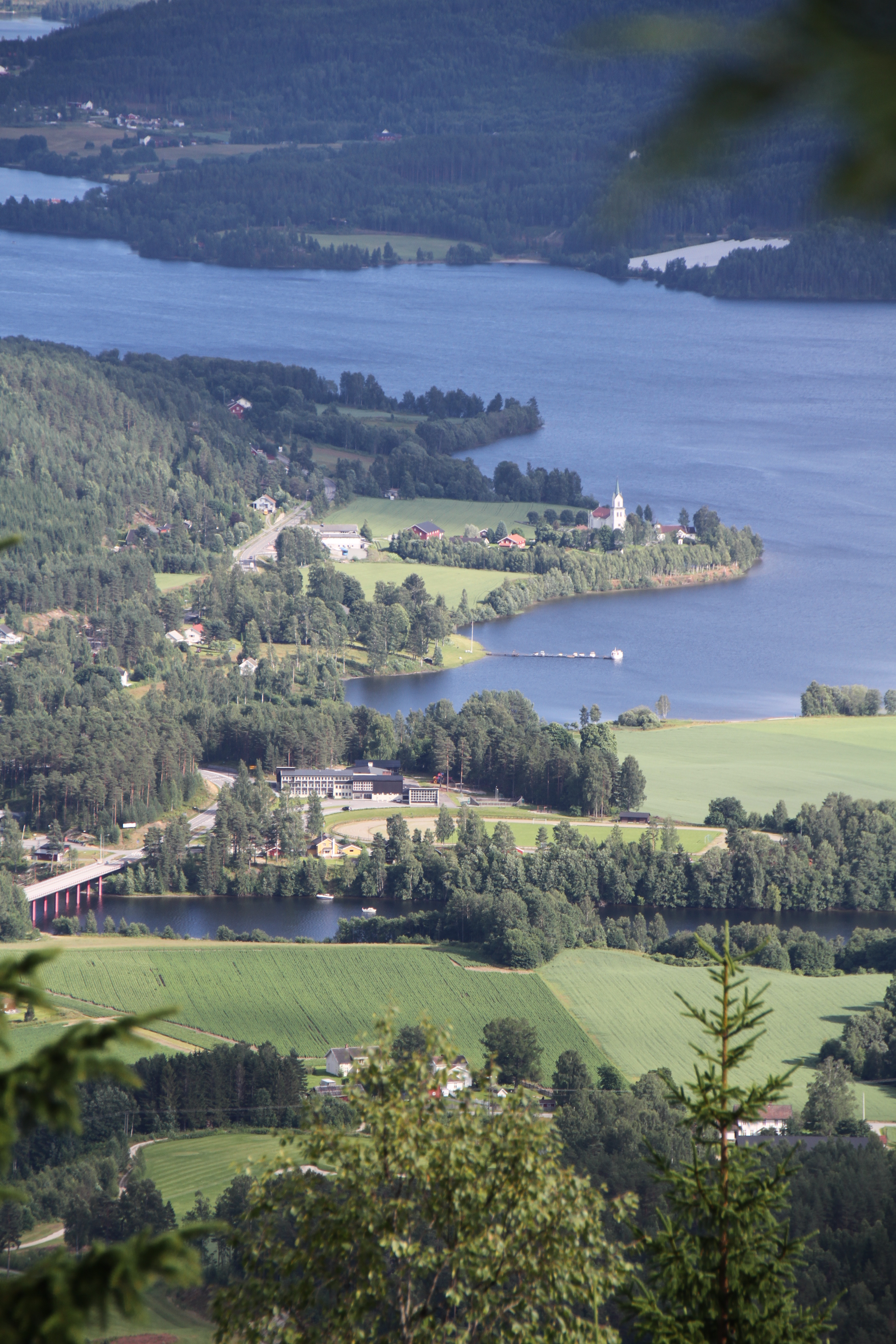
Lake Krøderen

Noresund is a small village in Krødsherad in the county of Buskerud, Norway.

Noresund is located on Lake Krøderen. Highway 7 (Riksvei 7) passes through the village. Norefjell Ski Area is located 3 kilometers northwest of Noresund. The population of Noresund is 331 (2006).

Noresund is the location of the Krødsherad Rectory Natural Monument (Krødsherad prestegård naturminne), holding an oak tree known as The Old Master. This tree was made famous by the poetry of Jørgen Moe, who was inspired to write "The Old Master" (den gamle Mester) during his time as a chaplain in the village.

== The name ==
The first element is the name of the farm Nore (Norse Nórar), the last element is sund n 'sound, strait'. The name of the farm is the plural of nór n 'narrow strait' - so the meaning of the name Noresund is 'strait-strait'. The actual strait divides Lake Krøderen in two parts (Upper K. and Lower K.). The farm Nore has also given name to the mountain Norefjell.
