= Krøderen (lake) =

Lake in Flå and Krødsherad, Buskerud, Norway

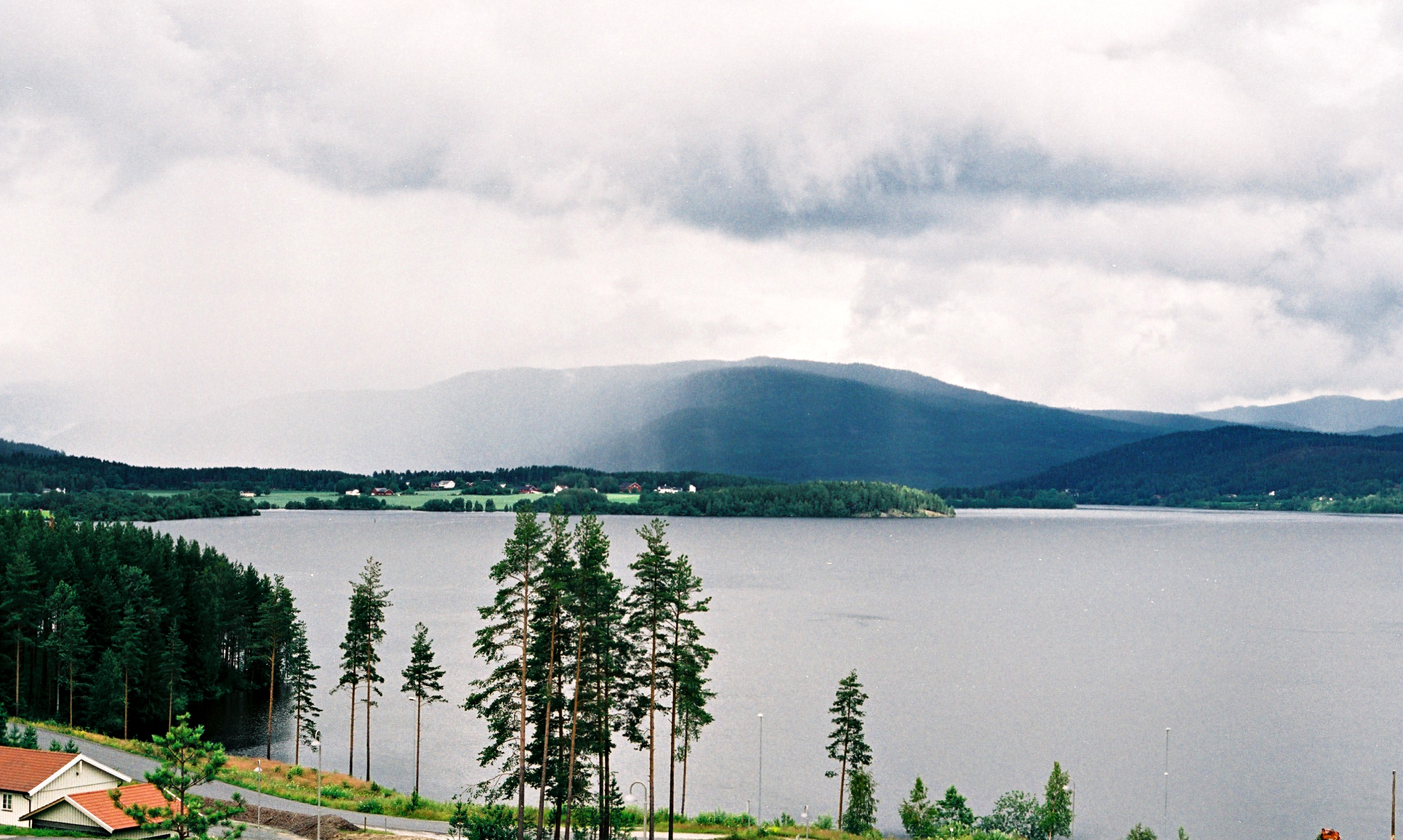

- Location within Buskerud
- Location: Krødsherad, Buskerud
- Coordinates: 60°15′N 9°38′E
- Type: glacier fjord lake
- Primary inflows: Hallingdalselva
- Primary outflows: Snarumselva
- Basin countries: Norway
- Max. length: 41 km (25 mi)
- Surface area: 43.91 km^{2} (16.95 sq mi)
- Average depth: 33 m (108 ft)
- Max. depth: 130 m (430 ft)
- Water volume: 1.449 km^{3} (0.348 cu mi)

Krøderen (also Krøderfjorden) is a lake in the municipality of Krødsherad in Buskerud, Norway.

== Summary ==
The lake stretches about 41 kilometers (25 mi) north from the village of Krøderen in Krødsherad on its southern end and reaches north to the village of Gulsvik in Flå municipality in the valley of Hallingdal. The lake has a surface area of about 44 km^{2}; and a maximum depth of 130 m (430 ft). The primary river flowing into it is Hallingdalselva to the north. Its outlet is via the Snarumselva at the south end of the lake. Snarumselva flows into the Drammen River by Geithus in Modum.

At Noresund, along Norwegian National Road 7 (Rv7), there is a bridge over the lake. Krøderen is only about 200 meters (660 ft) wide at a point. Sole Hotel (Sole Hotell Krødsherad) is located along the national road between Krøderfjorden and Norefjell. Sole Hotel was originally a former doctor's home dating back to the beginning of the 1900s. In 1966, the facility opened as Norway's first conference hotel.

== Etymology ==
The Old Norse form of the name must have been *Krœðir. This name is probably derived from the verb kryda 'stream/press together' related to Old English crudan 'to press, push'. In that case the name is probably referring to the narrow strait of Noresund.

== Gallery ==
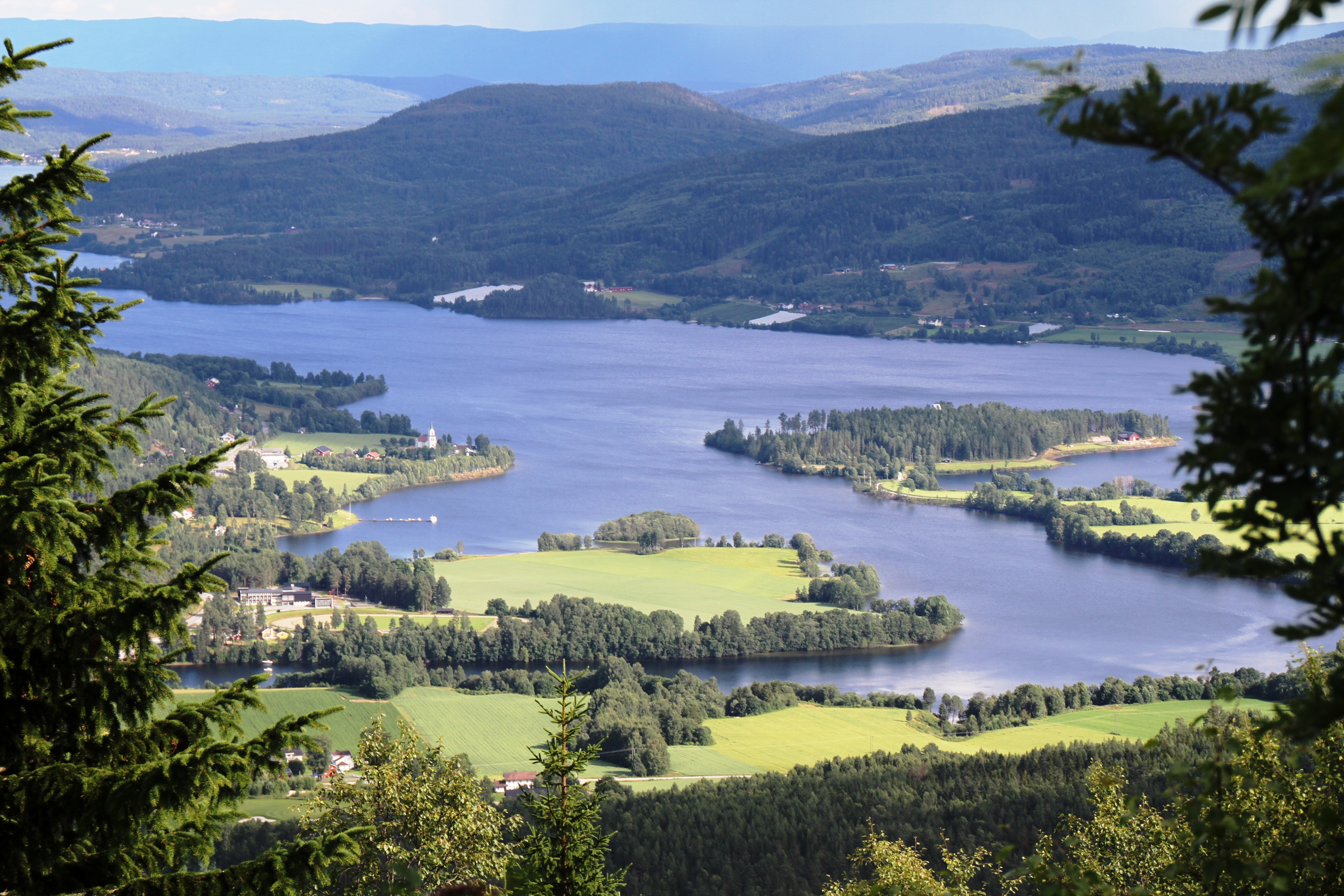
Krøderen from the Norefjell

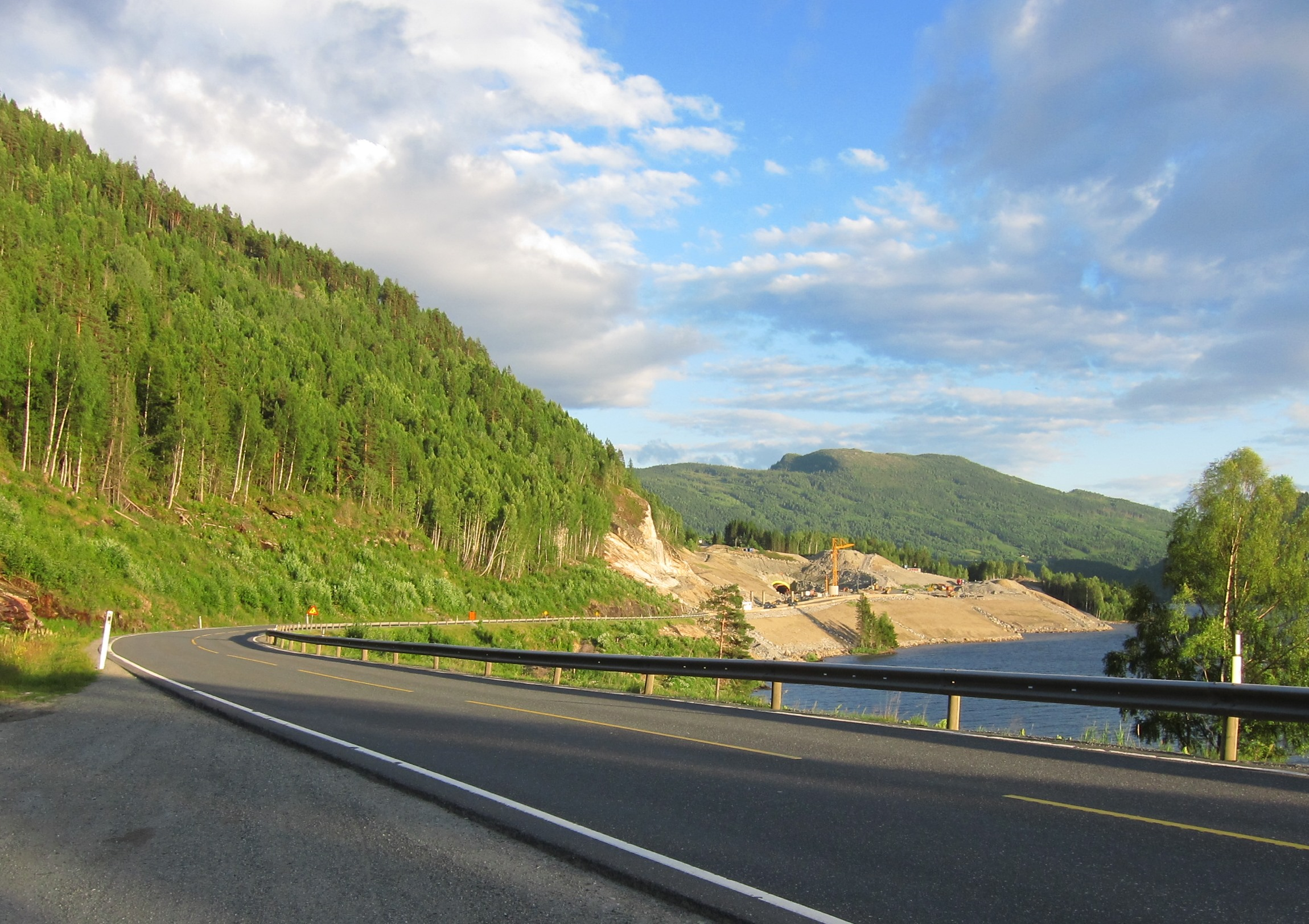
Krøderen at Ørgenvika

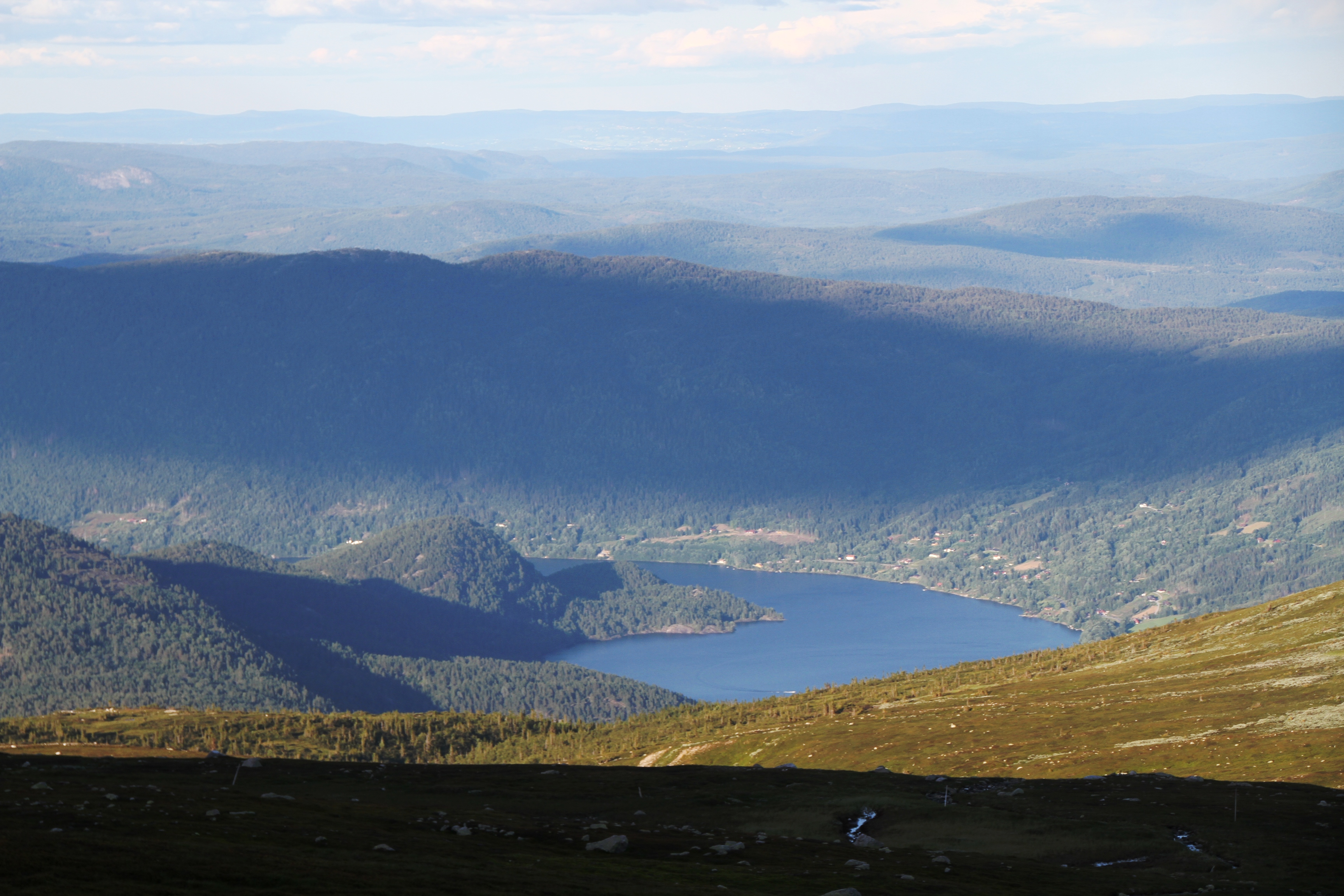
Distance view of Krøderen

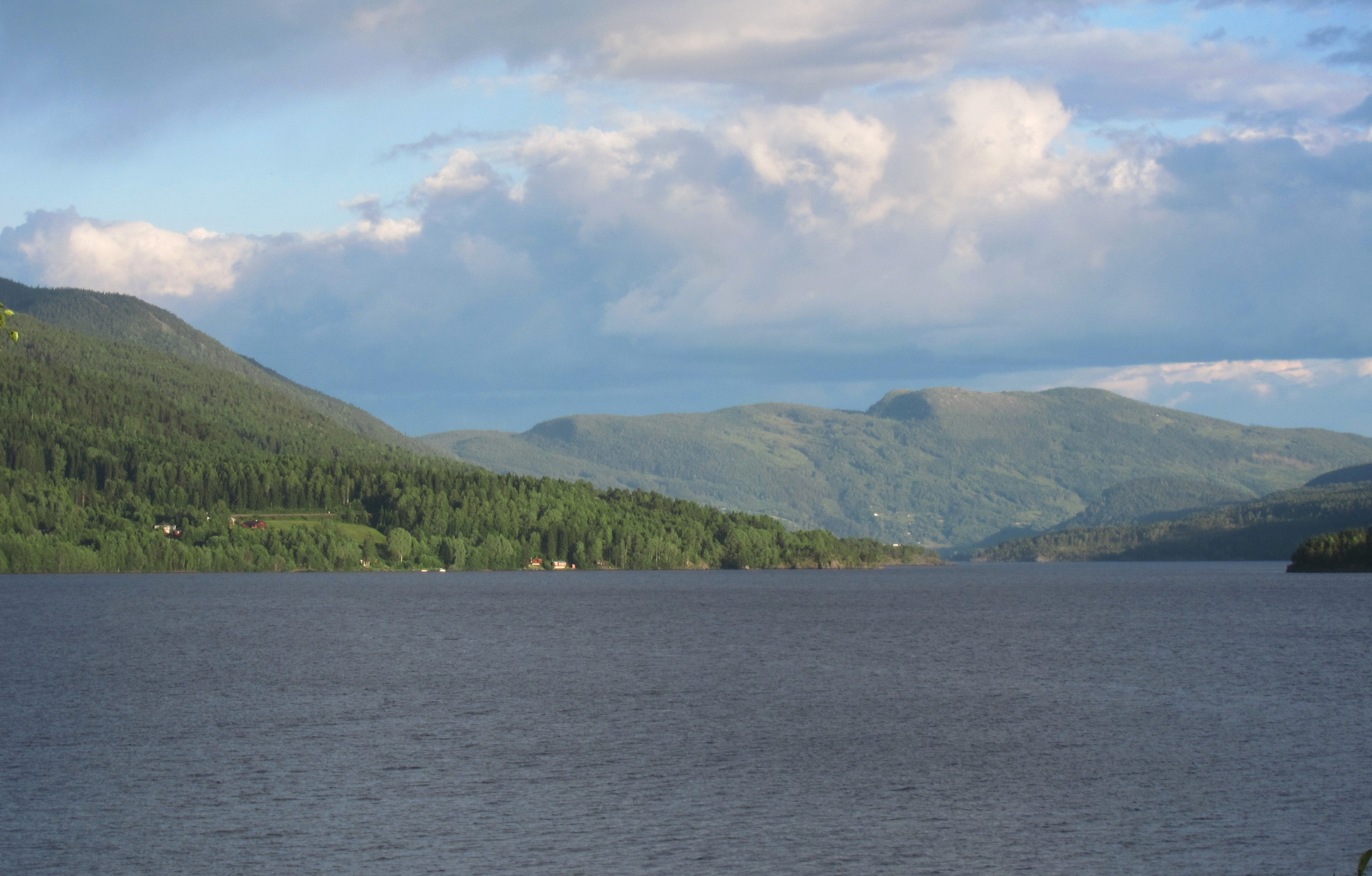
Krøderen near Gulsvik

== See also ==
- Krøderen Line
