= Protected areas of Norway =

Protected areas of Norway include:

- National parks of Norway
- Category:Nature_reserves_in_Norway

About 17 percent of the mainland of Norway is protected. Of this, ca. 8.3 percent is national parks, 1.3 percent is nature reserves and 4.7 percent otherwise protected.

IUCN aims to protect at least 15 percent of all types of nature.
