= Snarumselva =

River in Norway

Coordinates: 59°55′48″N 9°56′41″E

Snarumselva is a river in Buskerud county, Norway. It flows north to south from Krøderen, a lake in Krødsherad municipality, to Geithus, a village in Modum municipality, where it joins the Drammenselva river. The total length of Snarumselva is about 50 km (31 mi) and the total altitude loss is about 100 m (330 ft).

There are two hydroelectric power plants along Snarumselva, both located on natural waterfalls. The first is Ramfoss Power Plant, located on Ramfoss approximately 4.5 km (2.8 mi) south of the head of the river at Krøderen. The second, Kaggefoss Power Plant, is located on Kaggefoss, approximately two kilometres north of the terminus at Geithus. The portion of the river that runs from Kaggefoss to the terminus at Geithus is also sometimes called Kista.

== Ramfoss ==
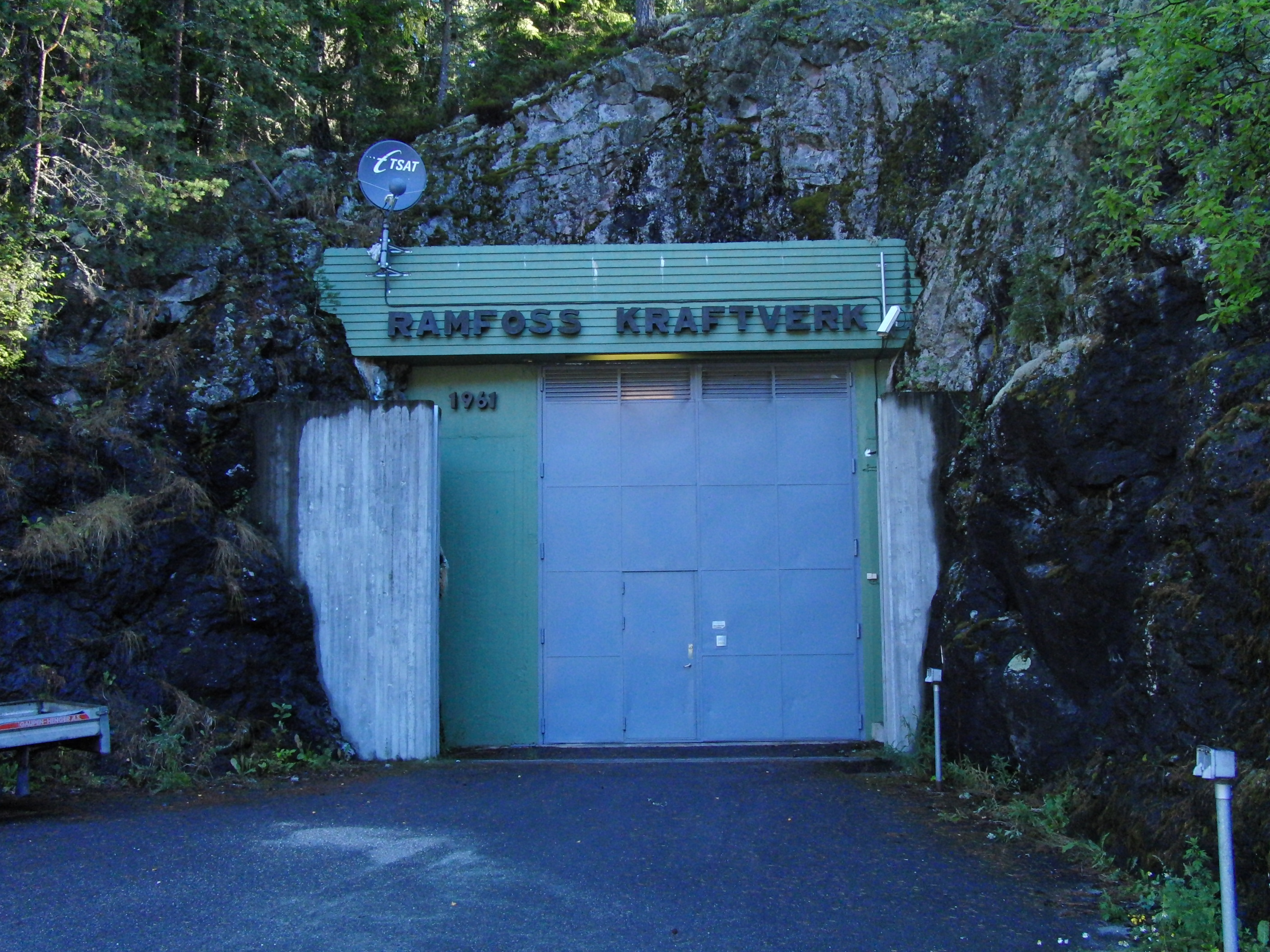
Ramfoss Power Station, located along Snarumselva

Ramfoss Power Station utilizes a fall of 23.6 m (77 ft). Operation began on July 27, 1961, and the plant was expanded June 20, 1970.

The power plant is operated by Midt Nett Buskerud AS and is owned by Modum municipality (36.35%), Krødsherad municipality (18.17%), Sigdal municipality (9.48%) and Buskerud county (36%).

== Kaggefoss ==
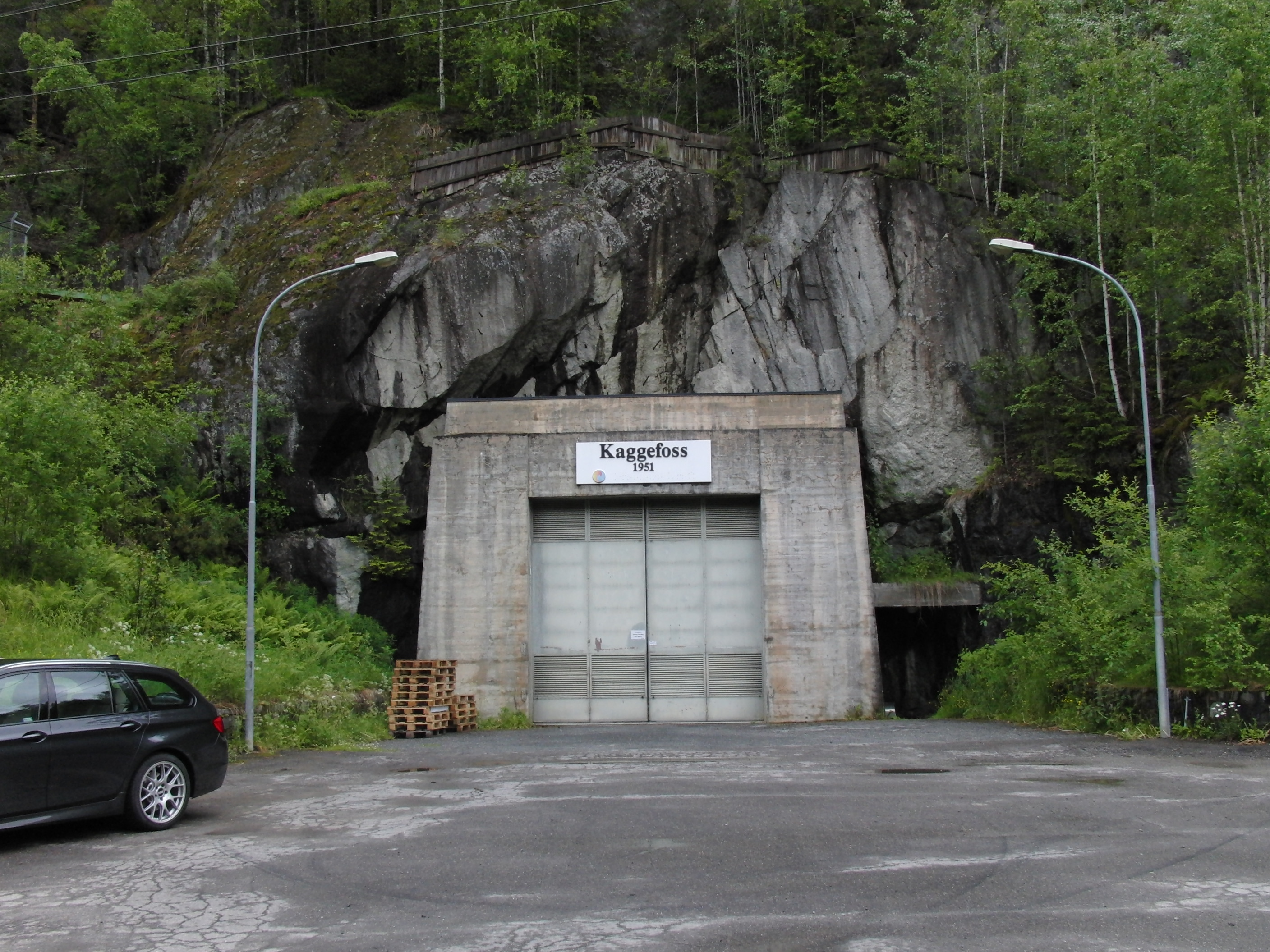
Kaggefoss Power Plant, located on Kaggefoss waterfall

The Kaggefoss waterfall is 22 m (72 ft) tall, at 120 m (390 ft) above sea level. The terrain nearby mostly consists of closed broad-leaved deciduous forests.

Kaggefoss Power Plant (Kaggefoss kraftstasjon) is located on the falls. It became operational in 1951 and was upgraded in 1999. The power station belongs to EB Power AS, a subsidiary of Energy Buskerud.
