= Krødsherad =

Krødsherad Municipality Krødsherad kommune
- Municipality
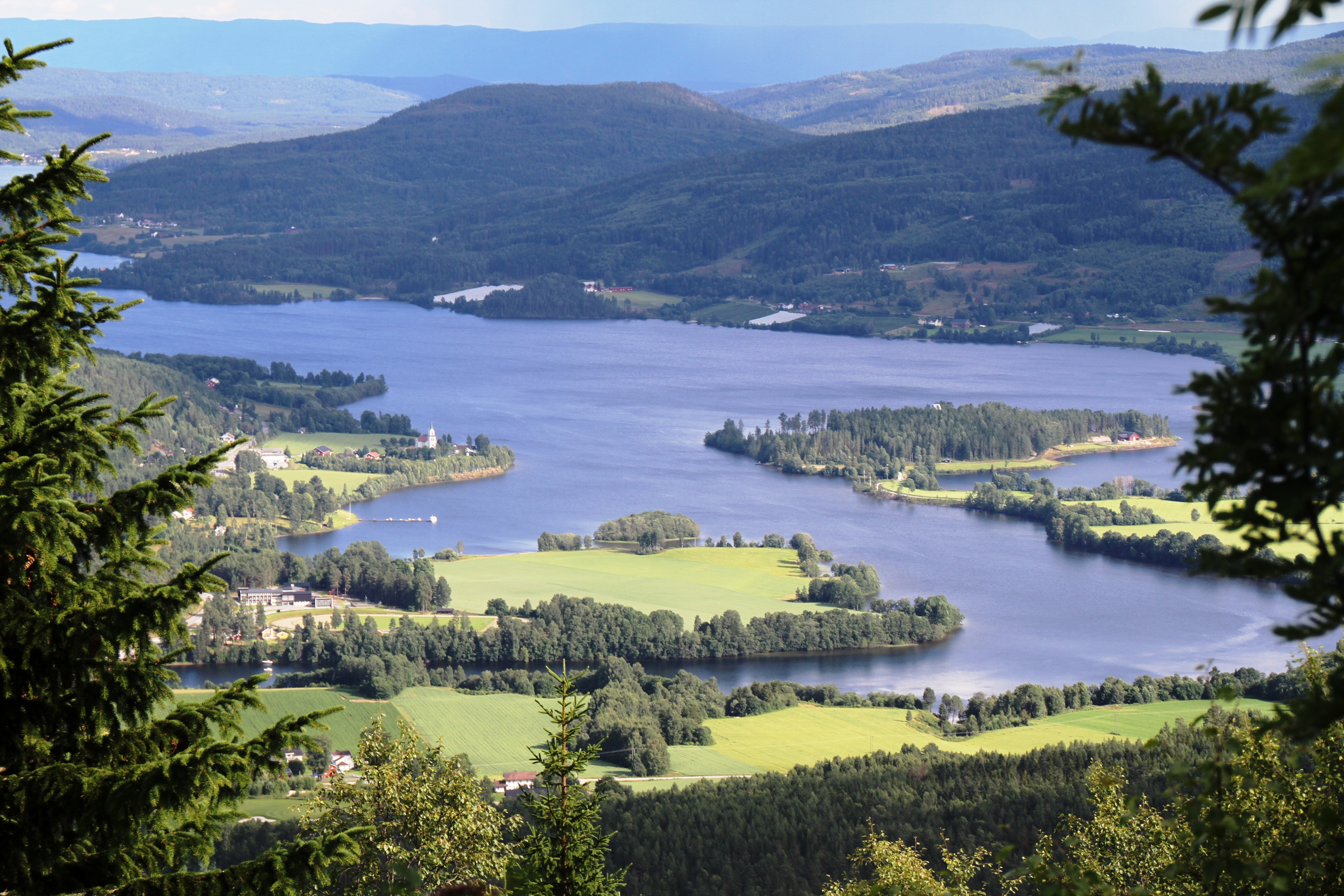

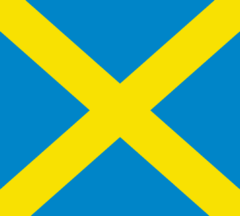
- Flag Coat of arms

- Buskerud within Norway

- Krødsherad within Buskerud
- Coordinates: 60°11′42″N 9°39′52″E
- Country: Norway
- County: Buskerud
- District: Ringerike
- Administrative centre: Noresund

Government
  - Mayor (2003): Olav Skinnes (Tverrpolitisk bygdeliste)

Area
  - Total: 375 km^{2} (145 sq mi)
  - Land: 340 km^{2} (130 sq mi)
  - Rank: #248 in Norway

Population (2004)
  - Total: 2,201
  - Rank: #327 in Norway
  - Density: 6/km^{2} (16/sq mi)
  - Change (10 years): ▼ −4.6%
- Demonym: Krylling

Official language
  - Norwegian form: Neutral
- Time zone: UTC+01:00 (CET)
  - Summer (DST): UTC+02:00 (CEST)
- ISO 3166 code: NO-3318
- Website: Official website

Krødsherad is a municipality in Buskerud county, Norway. The administrative centre of the municipality is the village of Noresund. The municipality of Krødsherad was established when it was separated from Sigdal Municipality on 1 January 1901.

== General information ==
=== Name ===
The Old Norse form of the name was Krœðisherað. The first element is the genitive case of the name of the lake Krøderen, the last element is herað meaning "district". Prior to 1918, the name was spelled Krødsherred.

=== Coat-of-arms ===
The coat-of-arms is from modern times. They were granted on 11 September 1981. The arms are supposedly canting arms. In older times, the name, Krødsherad, was commonly misunderstood as the word kross meaning "cross" or the area where two valleys crossed. Thus the saltire cross was taken as a symbol in the arms. New insights, however, derive the name from Krøderen, or a lake with a sharp curve (hooked-lake).

Number of minorities (1st and 2nd generation) in Krødsherad by country of origin in 2017
Ancestry	Number
Poland	59
Lithuania	38
Syria	25

== Geography ==
The district lies on the Krøderfjord in Hallingdal, and borders on the municipalities of Ringerike, Flå, Sigdal, and Modum. The municipality lies only 10 old Norwegian miles from Oslo. Settlement is scattered, with some concentration around the municipality's two principal centers, Noresund situated on the east side of Lake Krøderen and Krøderen at the southern end of Lake Krøderen.

== Economy ==
Agriculture is the primary industry with most agricultural land arable and mostly used for grain cultivation. The forestry industry also has historically been important. With the shoreline at Krøderen and the high mountains at Norefjell, the municipality enjoys a spectrum of natural environments from lake to mountain. As a result, there are many vacation homes in the municipality and tourism, especially winter sports in the Norefjell area, is an important contribution element in the economy.

== Attractions ==
=== Villa Fridheim ===
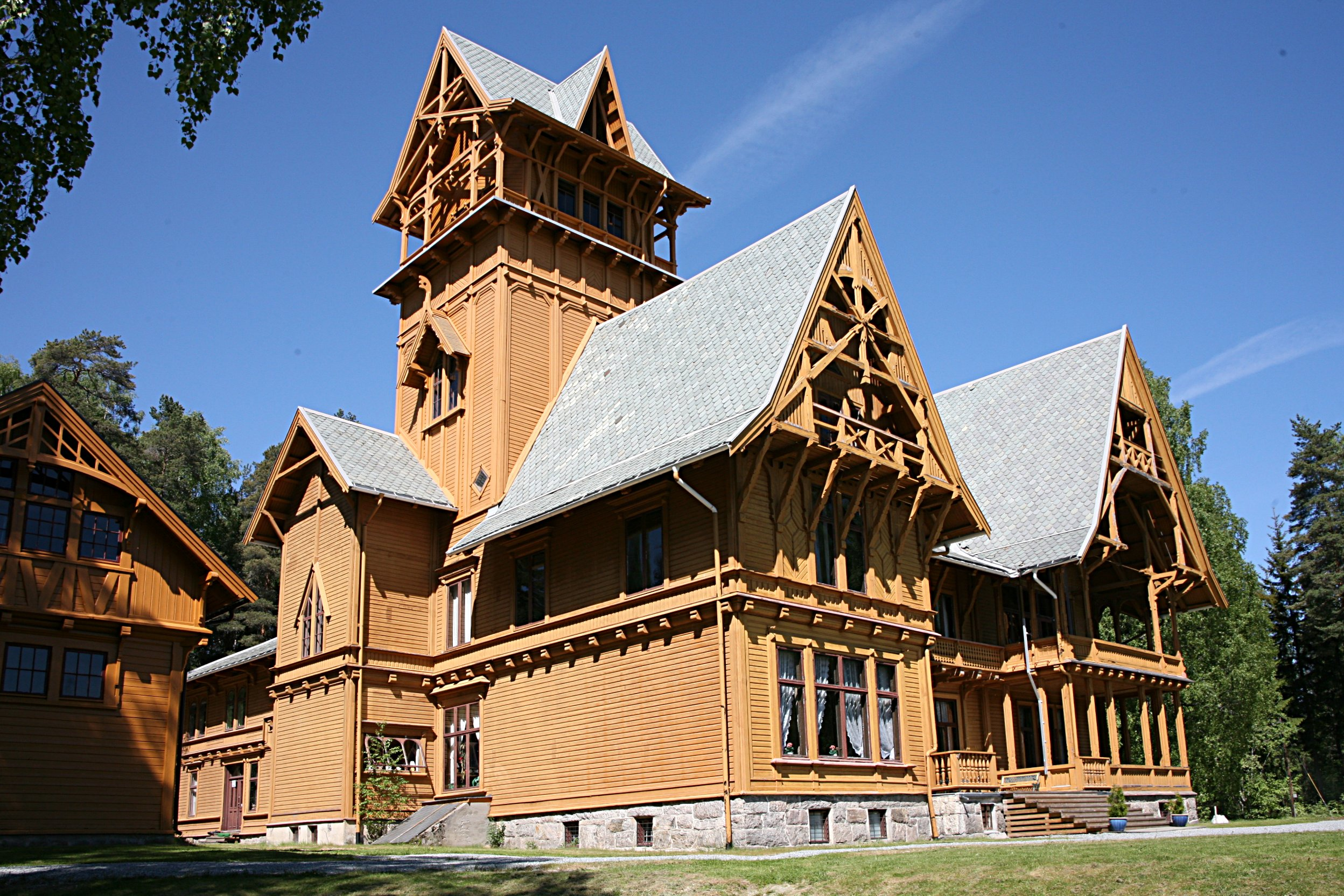
Villa Fridheim

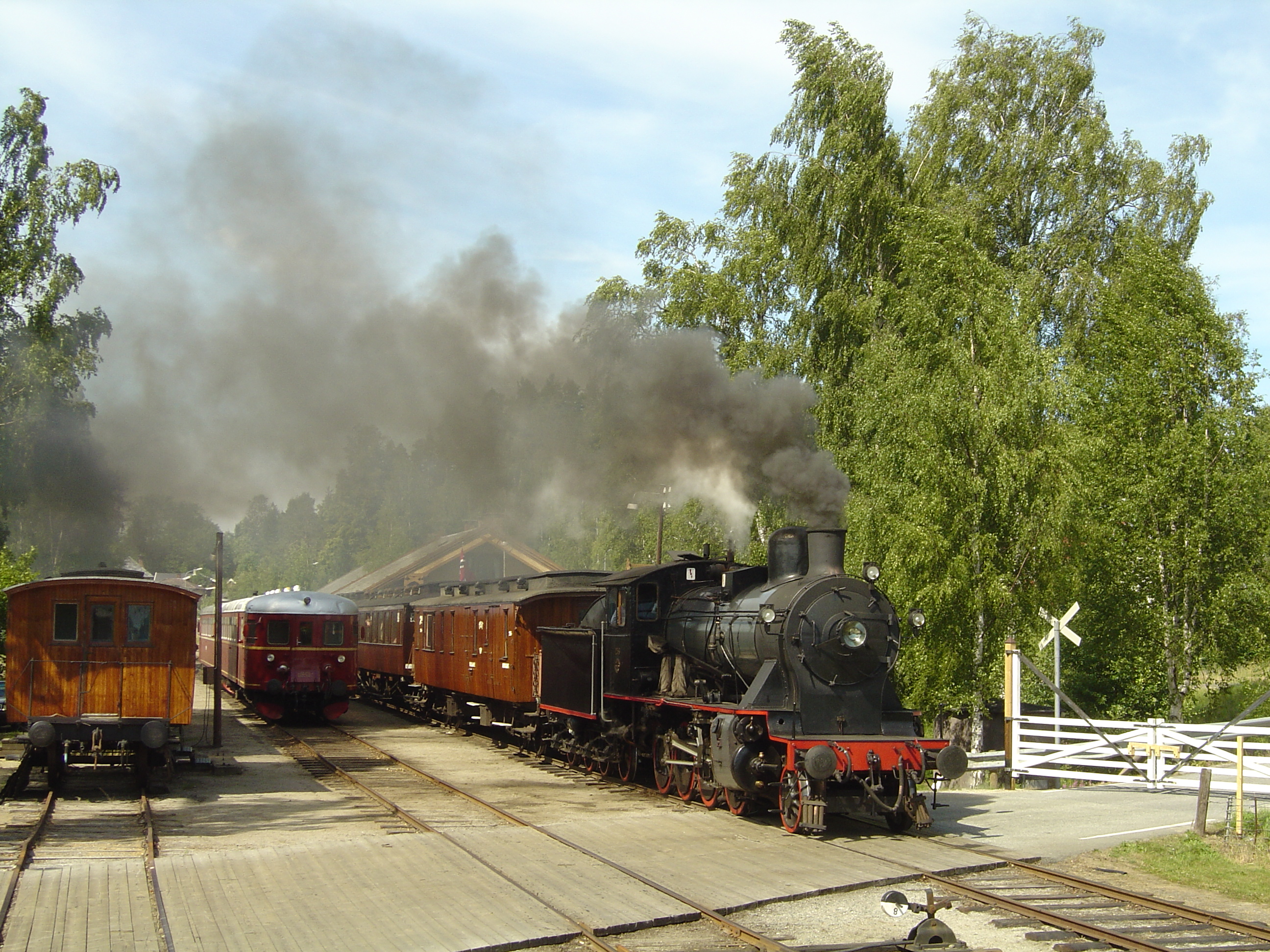
NSB type 24b No. 236 at Krøderen

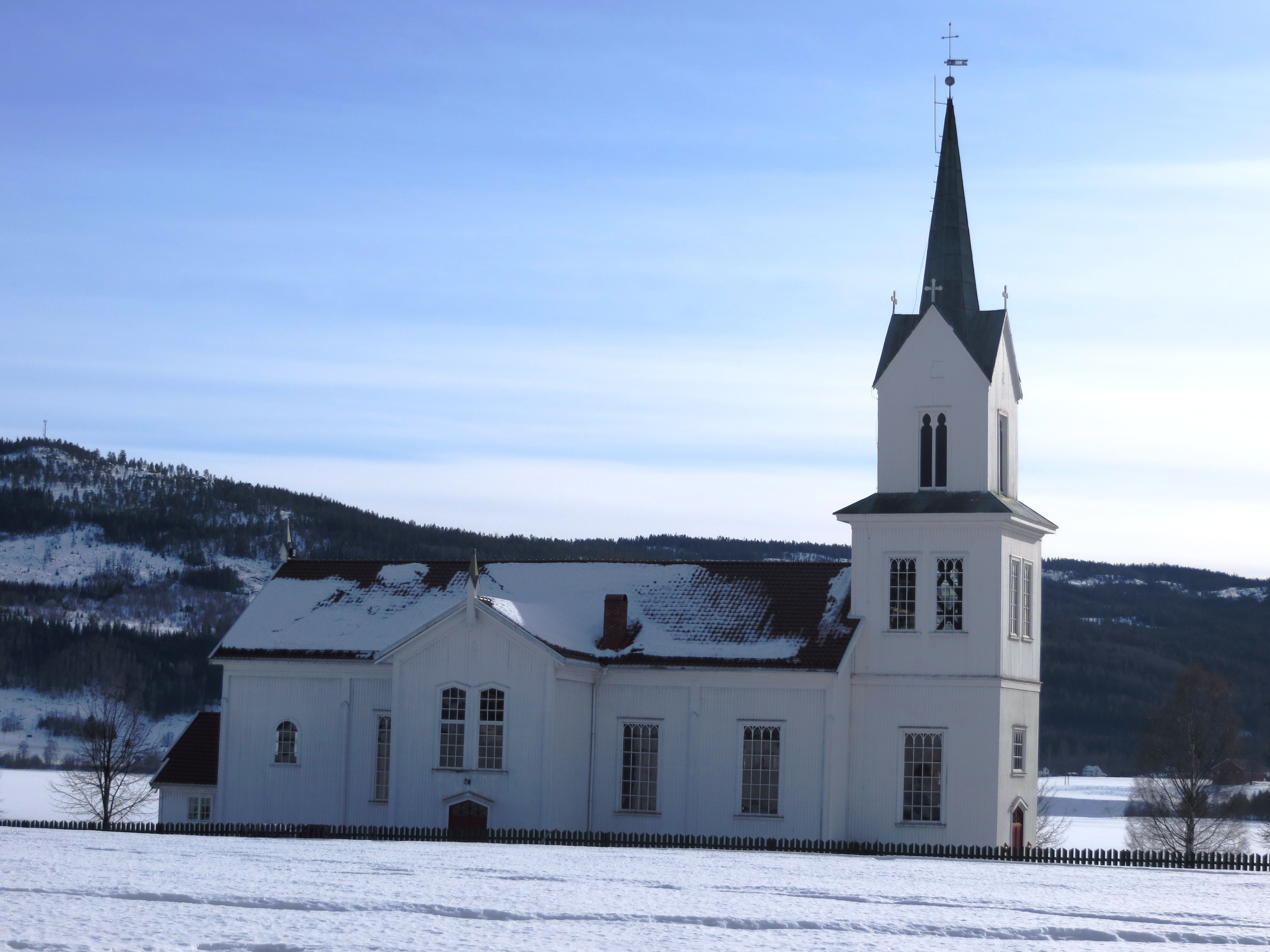
Olberg Church in Krødsherad

Villa Fridheim, a manor house which houses a folk museum, is one of Norway's largest timber buildings. The style is representative of romantic nationalism. The building was erected in 1890-92 as the country house of Drammen based timber merchant Svend Haug(1832-1891) and his wife Anne Marthea (Thea) Sveaas (1839-1924). The architect was Herman Major Backer (1856–1932), whose other commissions included Skaugum in Asker Municipality, Klemetsrud Church in Oslo Municipality, Sollihøgda Chapel in Hole Municipality, and St John's Church in Bergen Municipality.

The building functioned as a hotel and boarding house between 1914-60. The building was restored and opened as a folktale museum in the summer of 1986. In 1996 the museum opened a section dedicated to the great collectors of Norwegian fairy tales, Peter Christen Asbjørnsen and Jørgen Moe and to noted illustrators Theodor Kittelsen and Christian Skredsvig.

=== Krøderbanen ===
Krøderbanen Museum (Museet Krøderbanen) is a railroad museum headquartered in the former Krøderen Railroad Station at Krøderen. Krøderbanen was opened in 1872 as a narrow gauge line. It was converted to standard gauge in connection with the Bergen Railway opening in 1909 and remained in operation until 1985. Both rolling stock and fixed installations along the line is kept in running condition. Krøderbanen is also a center for the restoration and maintenance of railway equipment.

=== Norefjell Ski Resort ===
Norefjell Ski Resort was host to the downhill and giant slalom competitions of the 1952 Winter Olympics. Norefjell is only a 90-minute drive away from Oslo, making the ski resort the closest high mountain area to the Norwegian capital.

=== Olberg Church ===
Olberg Church (Olberg kirke) dates from 1859. Jørgen Moe, who was the chaplain from 1853 to 1863, committed himself to having a new church built at Krødsherad. It was constructed based upon designs by architect Gustav Adolph Lammers. The building was built of wood and has 600 seats. The new church was dedicated on October 19, 1859. It is part of the Church of Norway and belongs to Eiker Prosti in the Diocese of Tunsberg.

== Notable people ==
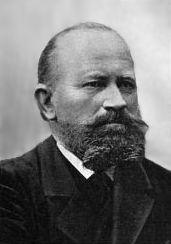
Amund Ringnes, 1901

- Niels Schultz (1780 in Krødsherad – 1832) a Norwegian cleric, author and politician
- Amund Ringnes (1840 in Krødsherad – 1907) brewery owner, founded Ringnes AS in 1876
- Moltke Moe (1859 in Krødsherad - 1913) a Norwegian folklorist
- Sigurd Moen (1897 in Krødsherad – 1967) speed skater, bronze medallist at the 1924 Winter Olympics
- Tormod Skagestad (1920 in Krødsherad – 1997) poet, novelist, playwright, actor and theatre director
- Otto Tschudi (born 1949 near Krødsherad) alpine skier, participated at the 1968 and 1972 Winter Olympics
