= Hallingdalselva =

River in Norway

Coordinates: 60°23′N 9°35′E

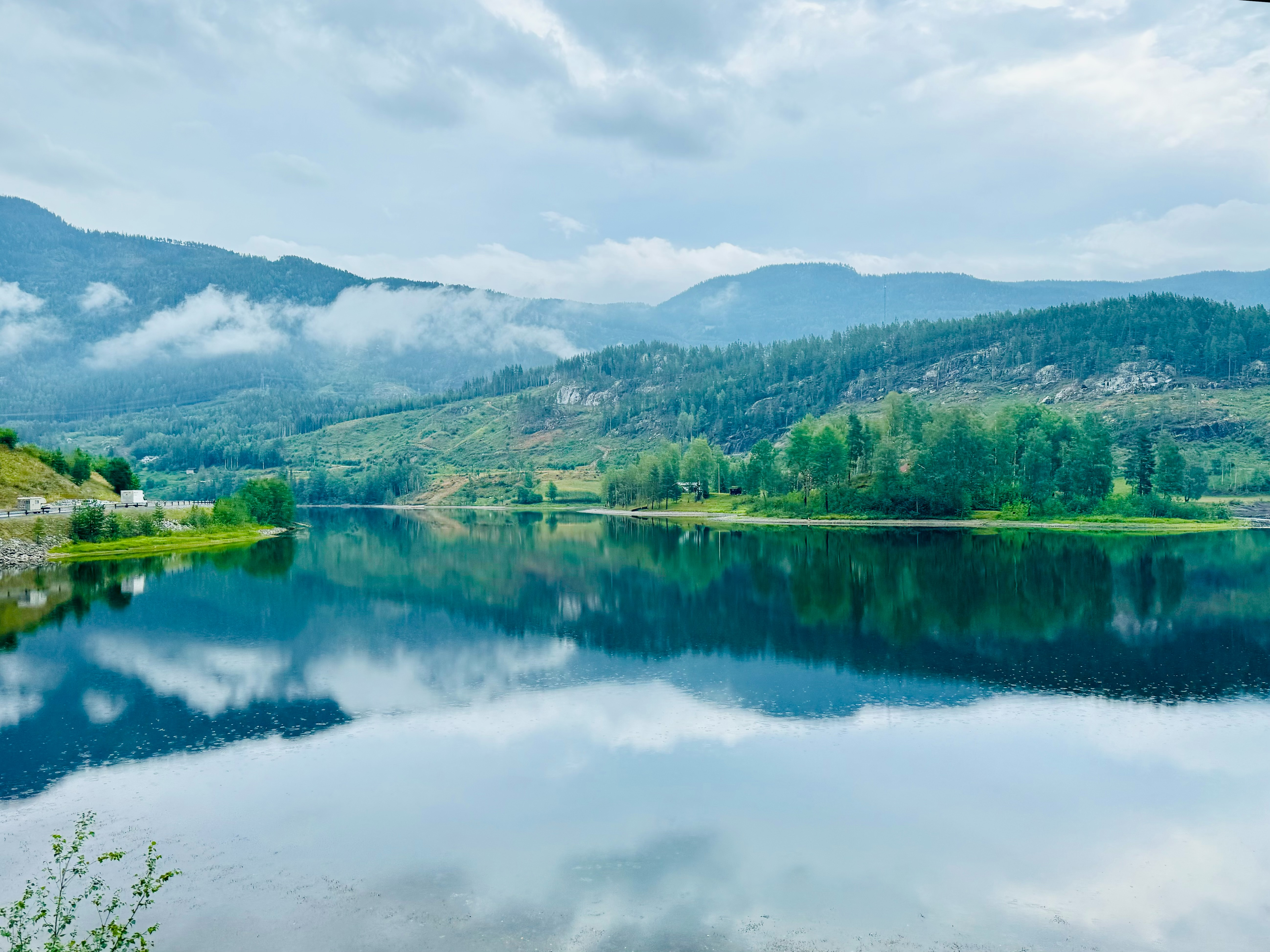

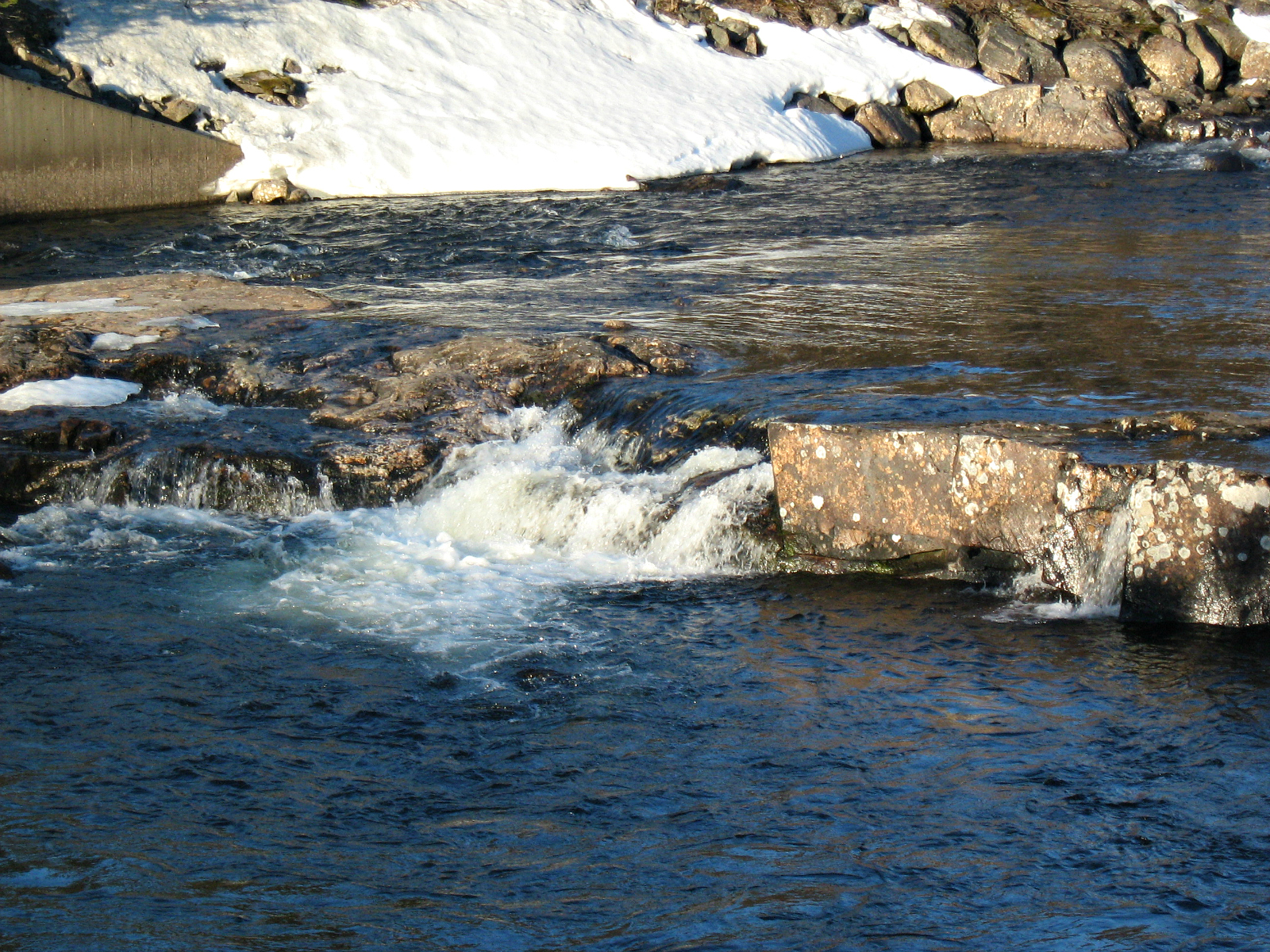
Hallingdalselva or Storåne near Hovet in Buskerud

The Hallingdalselva (English: Hallingdal River) is a river which flows through the valley and traditional district of Hallingdal in Buskerud County, Norway. Within the valley, the river is often referred to as the Great River (Storåne).

Hallingdal River rises in the Hardangervidda mountain plateau. Hallingdal River is formed by the confluence of the Usta River which flows from Lake Ustevatn and the Holselva River from Lake Strandavatnet. Hallingdal River flows from the north into Lake Krøderen (Krøderfjorden) at Gulsvik. Lake Krøderen discharges via the Snarumselva (Snamum river) at the south end of the lake.

A number of rivers flow into the Hallingdal including the Votna, Lya, Hemsil, Todøla and Rukkedøla. The Hallingdal has a total length of 220 kilometres (140 mi) and a catchment area of 4,587 square kilometres (1,771 mi^{2}). The river falls 318 metres (1,043 ft) in its journey to Krøderen, which is 132 metres (433 ft) above sea-level. There are many hydro-electric power stations in the valley with an annual power production of about 4 TWh. The whole river system is now almost fully developed with a total of 13 power plants. The largest plants are Hol I-III (275 MW), Nes (250 MW), Usta (184 MW) and Hemsil I-II (152 MW). The total average annual production is approximately 4143 GWh. Most of the waterfall rights are owned by E-CO Energi.

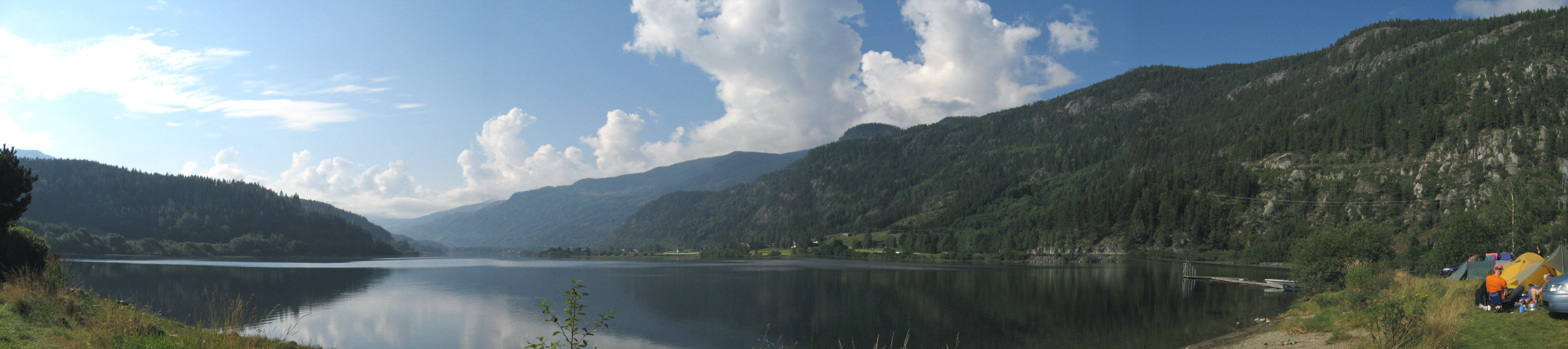
Hallingdalselva
