= Hallingdal =

- District
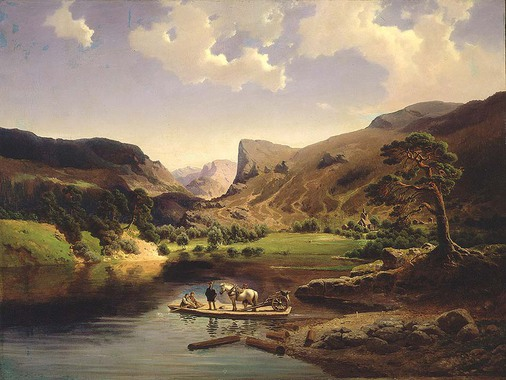
- Frå Hallingdal (Joachim Frich)

- Map of Hallingdal and municipalities within Viken County

- Location within Buskerud Location within Norway
- Coordinates: 60°38′N 9°3′E
- Country: Norway
- County: Buskerud
- Region: Austlandet
- Adm. Center: Nesbyen

Area
  - Total: 5,830 km^{2} (2,250 sq mi)

Population (2014)
  - Total: 20,569
  - Density: 3.53/km^{2} (9.14/sq mi)
- Demonym(s): Halling; Hallingdøl is used by many outside the valley.

Hallingdal (English: Halling Valley) is a valley as well as a traditional district located in the traditional and electoral district Buskerud county in Norway. It consists of six municipalities: Flå, Nes, Gol, Hemsedal, Ål and Hol.

Hallingdal is one of the major valleys of eastern Norway, on an area of 5,830 square kilometers. Hallingdal lies in the northern part of the county of Buskerud. The valley stretches from Gulsvik by Lake Krøderen to the border with Hordaland and Sogn og Fjordane. Central to the geography is relatively flat mountain area which lies 700–1,100 m (2,300–3,600 ft) above sea level. The valley is V-shaped and is drained by the Hallingdal River which originates in the western parts of Hardangervidda and flows eastwards later southwards through Hallingdal.

== Etymology ==
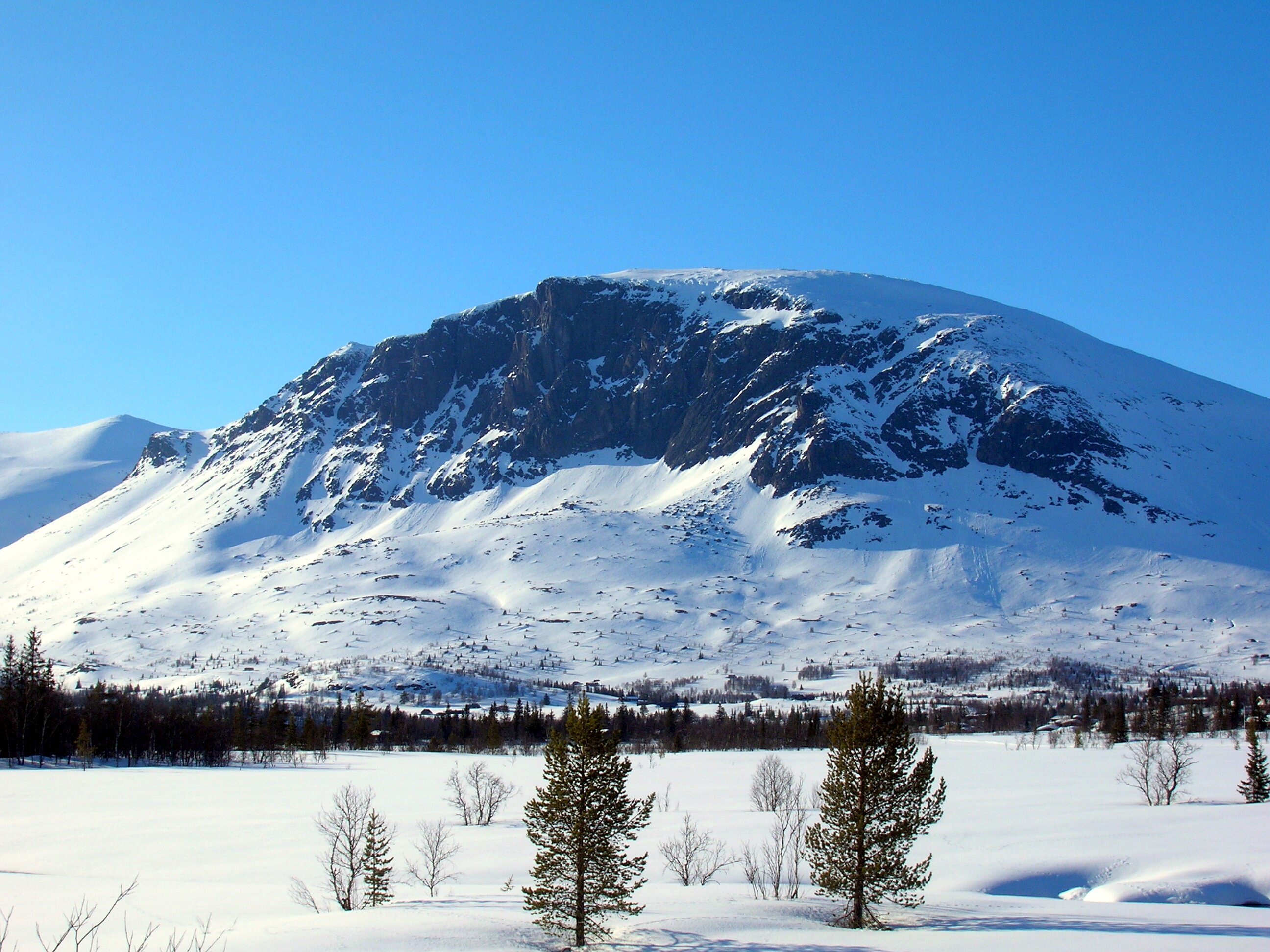
Skogshorn in Hemsedal, one of many high mountains in Hallingdal

The Old Norse form of the name was Haddingjadalr. The first recorded case beginning with Hall- is from 1443. The first element seems to be the genitive case of the name of the people Haddingjar or of the male name Haddingi. In Flateyjarbók, a man named Haddingr is mentioned as the king of Hallingdal. Compare with the first element in Gudbrandsdalen 'Gudbrand Valley'. In both cases the name is probably derived from the word haddr, meaning 'woman's hair' and the name can consequently be interpreted as meaning 'the long haired ones'. The last element is dalr which means 'valley, dale'.

== History ==
From early on, Hallingdal prospered from trading with iron, produced from local marshlands, and developed trading routes throughout the Iron Age. In later centuries, Hallingdal farmers traded cattle over the mountains from west to east. As the soil in the valley could be barren, trading was necessary. Ancient routes went to western Norway (Vestlandet) through Valdres and Hallingdal and down Røldal to Odda. Reflecting this route, Hallingdal and its neighboring valley of Valdres were originally populated by migrants from Vestlandet and spoke a western dialect. The actual migration routes are hard to map, and the migrants may have intermixed with local hunters from the mountains around the valley. In recognition of this, Cardinal Nicholas Breakespear, (later Pope Adrian IV) who was in Scandinavia as papal legate in 1153, included these two valleys in the Diocese of Stavanger.

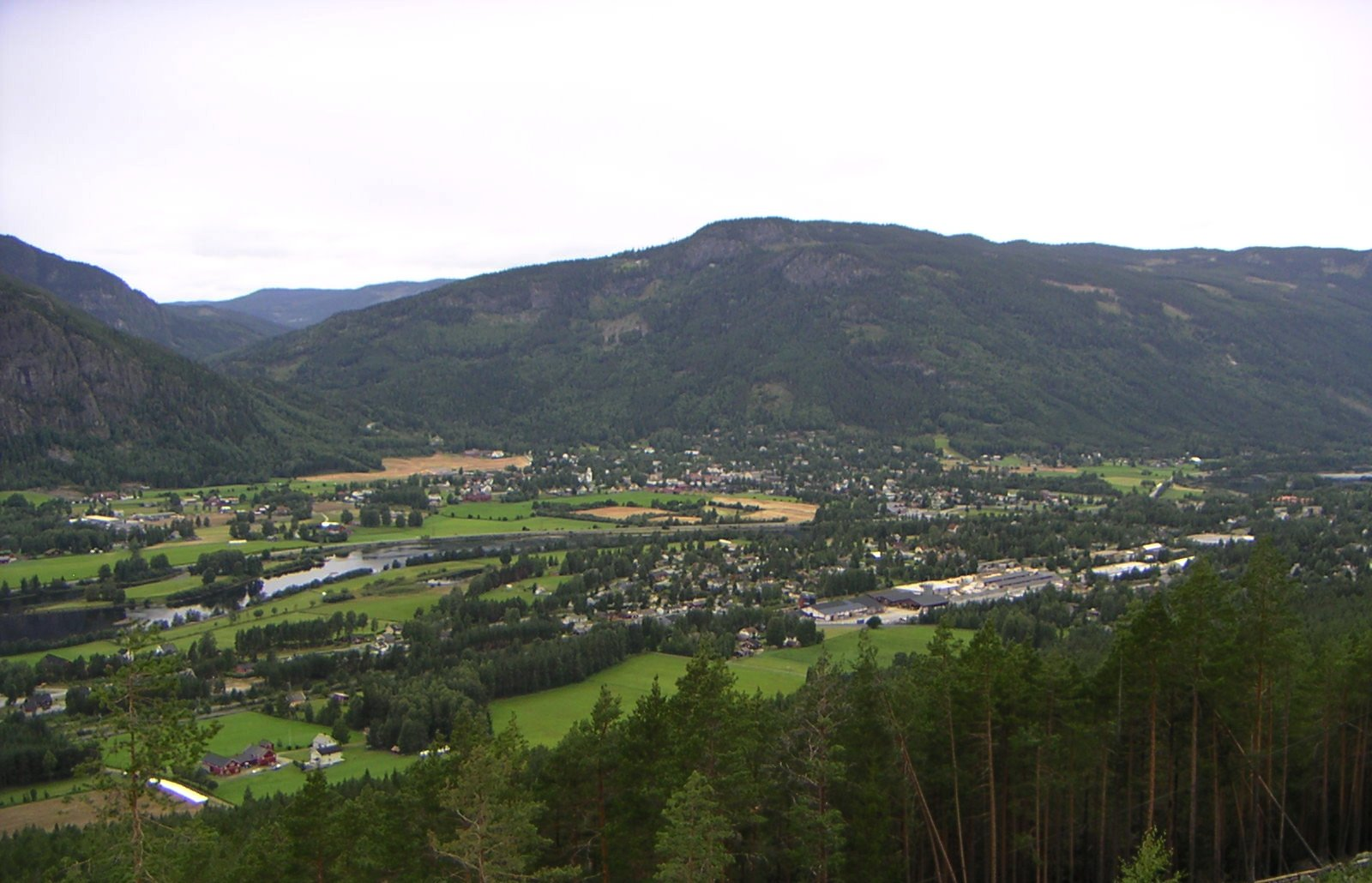
Nesbyen in Nesbyen Municipality is one of the largest settlements in Hallingdal

== Administration ==
Hallingdal includes Flå Municipality, Nesbyen Municipality, Gol Municipality, Hemsedal Municipality, Ål Municipality and Hol Municipality which cooperate through the Hallingdal Regional Council (Regionrådet for Hallingdal). The area is within the jurisdiction area of the Hallingdal District Court (Hallingdal tingrett).

== Local culture ==
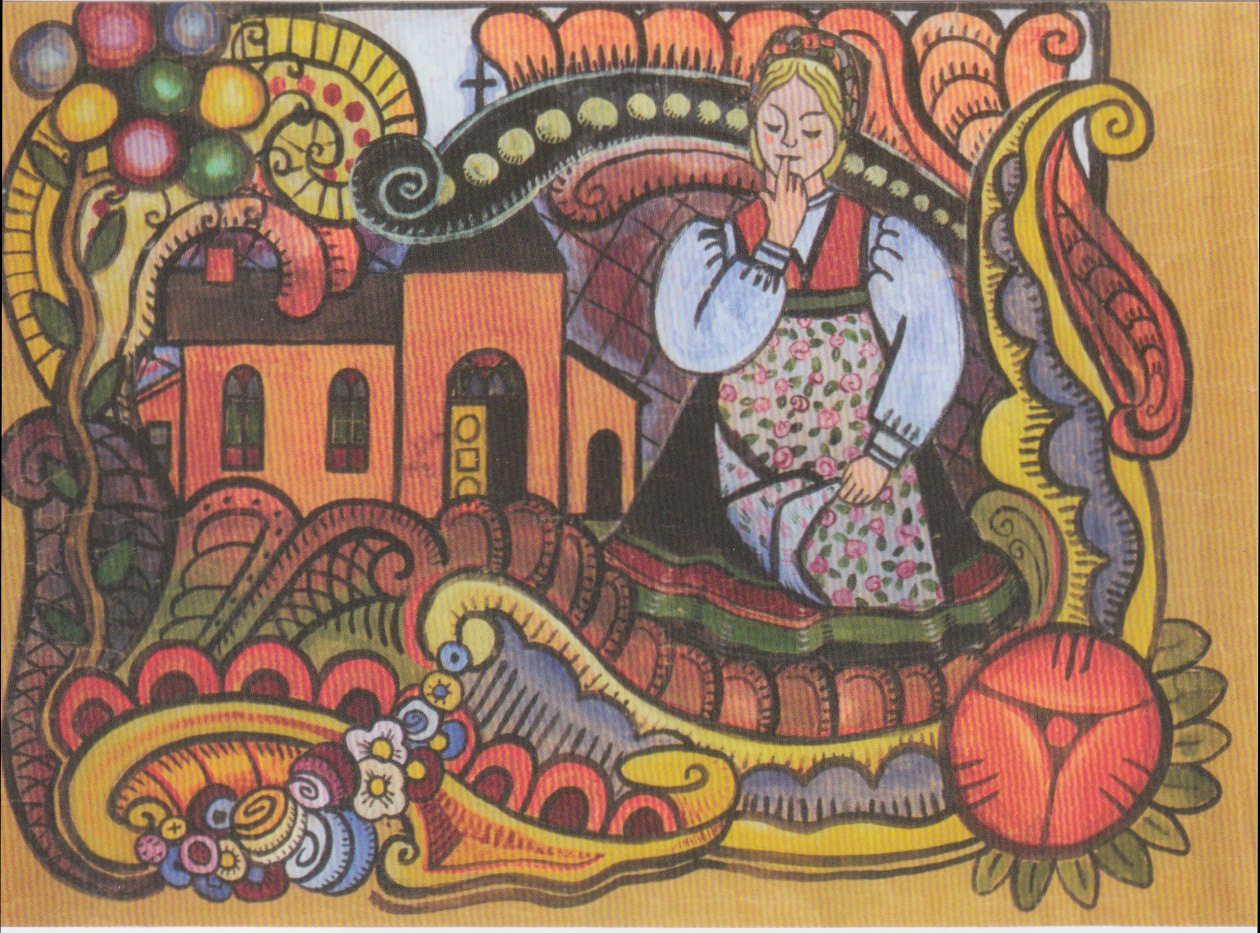
Girl from Hallingdal – Design for a traditional folk costume

=== Art ===
Hallingdal has developed its own style of rosemaling with a distinct symmetric style, different from those of Telemark and Valdres. The valley also fostered a number of known painters during the 18th and 19th century. The parents of Norwegian romanticist painter Hans Gude lived in Hallingdal until 1852, and Gude painted many of his works there.

=== Music ===
The music of Hallingdal is traditionally dominated by the hardanger fiddle, which was taken into use from c. 1750. The dance tunes of the valley have a distinct pattern, following three different lines of tradition, one in the south, at Nes, and two in the area of Ål. The tunes from Ål are recognized by a distinct rolling on the fiddle-bow, and the tunes are fairly old.

From early on, Hallingdal also developed a tradition for langeleik, partly replaced by the fiddle. The folk music tradition is held alive even today in the valley. After the opening of the Bergen Line Railway between Oslo and Bergen, the accordion came into more frequent use. Many fiddle tunes were adapted to the new instrument – usually a diatonic button accordion. Hallingdal is the most common area where the old fiddle music were adapted like this in local tradition.

The Halling is the name of an old folk dance that is traditionally used in Norway. Each dancer is alone, in contrast to the more common couple's dances. The climax of the dance is known as thrown Halling, where the goal is to kick down a hat from a stick. The dance is often called Lausdans meaning "loose dance" in Hallingdal and Valdres, but is known as the Halling in most other valleys.

=== Dialect ===
The Halling dialect is the distinctive regional dialect of Hallingdal. It has many features in common with Valdresmålet, the regional dialect common to neighboring Valdres. Differences exist within the dialect, generally between the lower and upper parts of the valley. Here, as elsewhere, regional dialects are under strong pressure to change due to outside forces such as mass media and increased mobility in society.

== See also ==
- Hallingdalselva
- Hallingdal Museum
- Hallingmål-Valdris
