= Kongssagene Tresliperi =

Norwegian wood pulp company

- Formerly: Kongsfoss Træsliperi; Kongssagene Brug
- Company type: Aksjeselskap
- Industry: Wood pulp
- Founded: 1870
- Defunct: 1937
- Headquarters: Modum, Buskerud, Norway
- Products: Wood pulp

Kongssagene Tresliperi was a Norwegian industrial company that produced wood pulp in Modum. The company was established in 1870 and closed in 1937.

== History ==
Johan Gregersen and Otto Mørch initiated the founding of Kongssagene Tresliperi in 1870; the same Otto Mørch later helped start Skotselv Cellulosefabrik in 1888. The mill was built at the outlet of the Simoa river into the Drammen River and was the first wood-processing company in Modum municipality. Myrens Verksted in Christiania designed and installed the plant in 1870, fitting two grinding machines. Production began in 1871, and the plant was expanded with a new grinding machine between 1873 and 1874. The company was also modernized and expanded in 1880, 1893, and 1918, with the largest rebuildings in 1888 and 1912.

=== Expansions, change of ownership, and dispute over river regulation ===
A new mill was built in 1888, fitted with a horizontal grinding machine driven by a 300 hp turbine. The transport of timber into the factory and of pulp during production was improved with a billet conveyor and a pulp feeder. In 1893 another grinding machine and a larger turbine were installed. The next major rebuilding came in 1912, after the mill burned to the ground; it was rebuilt with two grinding machines and five board machines. Just after the First World War the company produced 3,500 tonnes of 50 percent wet pulp on two grinding machines. Despite several expansions, Kongssagene was not a large company compared with other mills.

Taking part in the operation of Kongssagene required considerable investment, and the investment Gregersen and Mørch made in 1888, when the new mill was built, proved demanding to service, on top of the 1893 expansion. The plant was therefore sold to the German owners of Modum Blåfarveverk in 1897.

The wood-processing companies lay close together along the Drammen watercourse. In 1914 Kongssagene Brug sued one of its neighbors to the south, A/S Holmen-Hellefos, which had raised the dam at Hellefossen. This regulation caused water to build up farther up the watercourse, reducing the head at Døvikfossen, where Kongssagene held waterfall rights. The case ended with Holmen-Hellefos ordered to lower the dam again and to pay legal costs and daily fines to Kongssagene Tresliperi.

=== Municipal operation ===
A little over 20 years passed before the German owners wished to be relieved of their involvement in Kongssagene. The operation was no success, and Modum municipality was offered the chance to buy the business; after a long struggle to make it pay, in October 1919 the municipality took over Modum Blåfarveverk, Haugfoss Træsliperi, and Kongssagene Tresliperi, forming a new company named Modum kommunale Bruk.

The management of Modum kommunale Bruk converted the plant to electric operation, buying a 100 hp electric motor in 1922, as electric power would ensure more continuous operation of the mill given the water shortage in the Simoa. Kongssagene was thus operated together with Haugfos Træsliperi, and in 1926 a strategy was drawn up under which all pulp production would be placed at Kongssagene while Haugfos would be rebuilt as a power station to drive the mill at Kongssagene. The plans were never realized, as Haugfos burned down in December 1926.

=== Working conditions ===
Compared with the large plants in the Drammen district, the workforce at Kongssagene Tresliperi was never large. At its start in the 1870s the company had 13 employees, and by the turn of the century in 1900 the workforce had grown to 50.

The workers at the mill were closely bound to the management. The historian Eli Moen writes that at the Kongssagene and Haugfos mills, wood processing represented a continuation of old sawmill and works operation, and that both mills largely kept the paternalistic system already established. These paternalistic ties to the management dampened union organizing in the early years. The wave of organizing that swept the Drammen district in 1906 strongly affected Modum municipality, and Kongssagene was no exception; despite the strong bonds between employees and management, a trade union was formed there on 26 August 1906. The union was in time attached to the Norwegian Paper Industry Workers' Union as branch number 47. Organizing weakened the bond to the factory manager as a fatherly figure of undisputed authority.

=== Toward closure ===
In 1926 Halfdan Jørgensen was hired as the new manager of Modum kommunale Bruk, arriving just after the Haugfos fire that December. Operation of Kongssagene continued until 1930, the year the world economic crisis struck the wood-processing industry hard. Prices fell considerably, and Modum municipality ended its involvement in the company in 1932. Jørgensen continued the mill on his own account until 1937, when wood pulp production at Kongssagene came to an end.

== Bibliography ==
- Moen, Eli (1993). Modum – ei bygd med tre elver. Industrialiseringen av ei østlandsbygd 1870–1940. Modum, pp. 27, 30–31, 167, 251–252, 256–257, 320–321, 325.
- Sætherskar, Johs., ed. (1951). Det norske næringsliv. Buskerud Fylkesleksikon. Bergen.
