= Modum kommunale Bruk =

Norwegian municipal company

- Type: Municipal company
- Industry: Wood pulp
- Founded: 1919
- Defunct: 1937
- Headquarters: Modum, Buskerud, Norway
- Products: Wood pulp

Modum kommunale Bruk was a Norwegian company made up of several businesses that produced wood pulp in Modum. It was established in 1919. Haugfos Træsliperi was closed in 1926, and Kongssagene Tresliperi in 1937.

== History ==
In October 1919, Modum municipality took over Modums Blaafarveværk, Haugfoss Træsliperi, and Kongssagene Tresliperi, combining them into a new company named Modum kommunale Bruk. Several municipalities along the Drammen watercourse had set up electricity committees to study the possibilities for local power development, and it was Modum's committee that initiated the purchase of Blåfarveverket together with the two mills.

Modum had many waterfalls, and securing the rights to them for electricity development was a central reason for forming the company, particularly control over the attractive falls in the Simoa.

== Bibliography ==
- Moen, Eli (1993). Modum – ei bygd med tre elver. Industrialiseringen av ei østlandsbygd 1870–1940. Modum, pp. 170, 237.
