= Gravfoss Power Station =

Hydroelectric plants in Norway

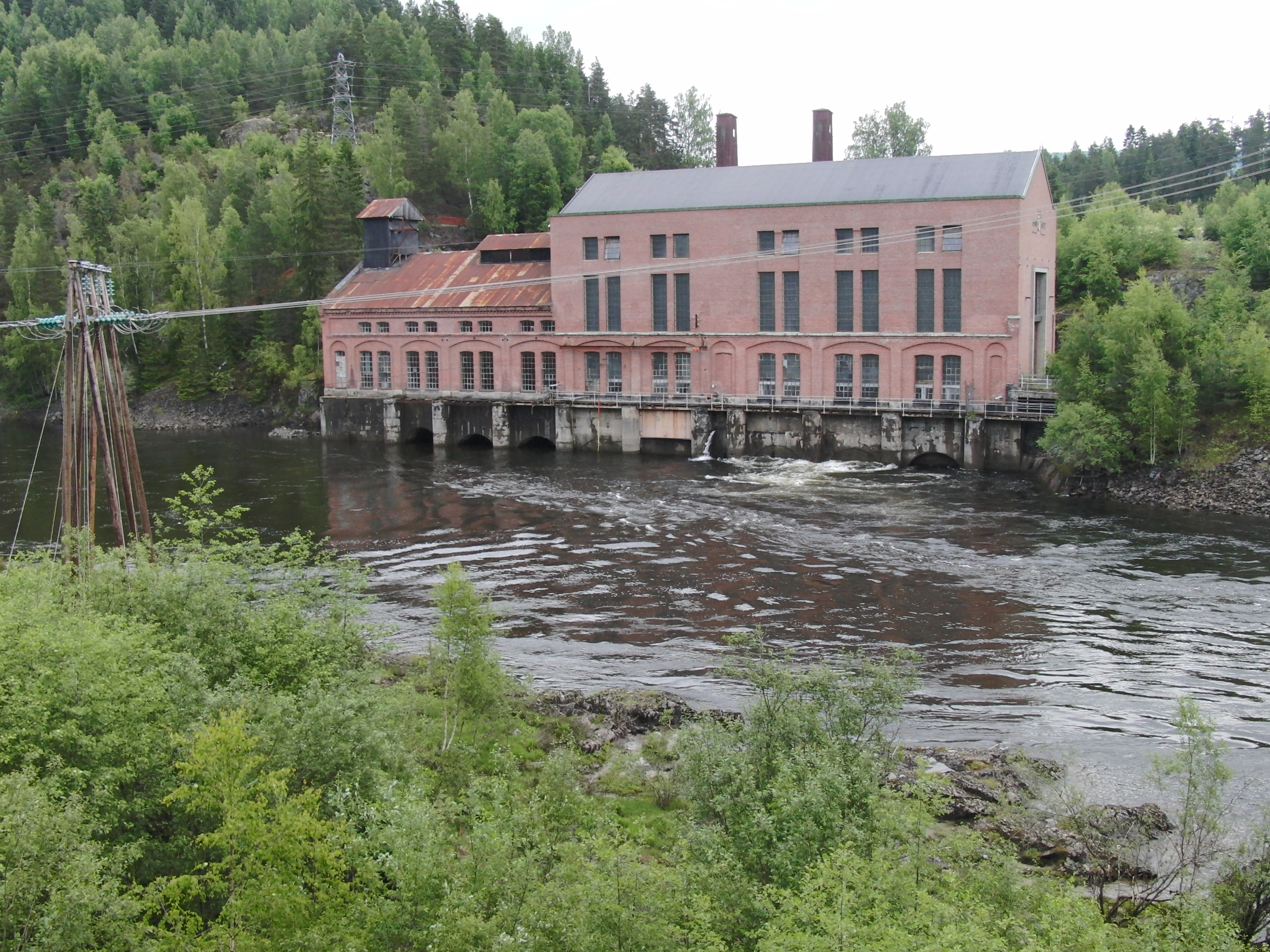
- Gravfoss I
- Country: Norway
- Location: Modum Municipality, Buskerud
- Coordinates: 59°55′46″N 9°56′47″E
- Status: Operational
- Commission date: 1996
- Owner: Glitre Energi
- Operators: Glitre Energi Produksjon; Å Energi Vannkraft

Tidal power station
- Tidal range: 20 m (66 ft)

Power generation
- Nameplate capacity: 30 MW; 30.2 MW
- Annual net output: 249 GWh (900 TJ)

Gravfoss Power Station (Norwegian: Gravfoss kraftverk) consists of two run-of-the-river power plants in the Drammen watercourse, in Modum Municipality in Buskerud county, Norway.

The plants lie just above the confluence with the Snarum River in the village of Geithus, below Geithusfoss Power Station, and use water coming from Tyrifjorden, the Begna, and the Randsfjorden/Dokka watercourses. Both plants use the drop from the intake dam above Gravfossen, which originally had a natural fall of 14 metres (46 ft). The current dam was put into use in 1935 and can be regulated with one sector gate and one segment gate.

Both power plants are owned by Glitre Energi.

== Gravfoss I ==
The older power plant was originally put into operation in 1903 and was expanded in 1931. It has a head of 19.7 metres (65 ft), utilized in one Francis turbine and one Kaplan bulb turbine. Total output is 19 megawatts (25,000 hp), with a possible mean annual production of 30 gigawatt-hours (110 TJ). This plant is now used mainly as a flood power plant.

== Gravfoss II ==
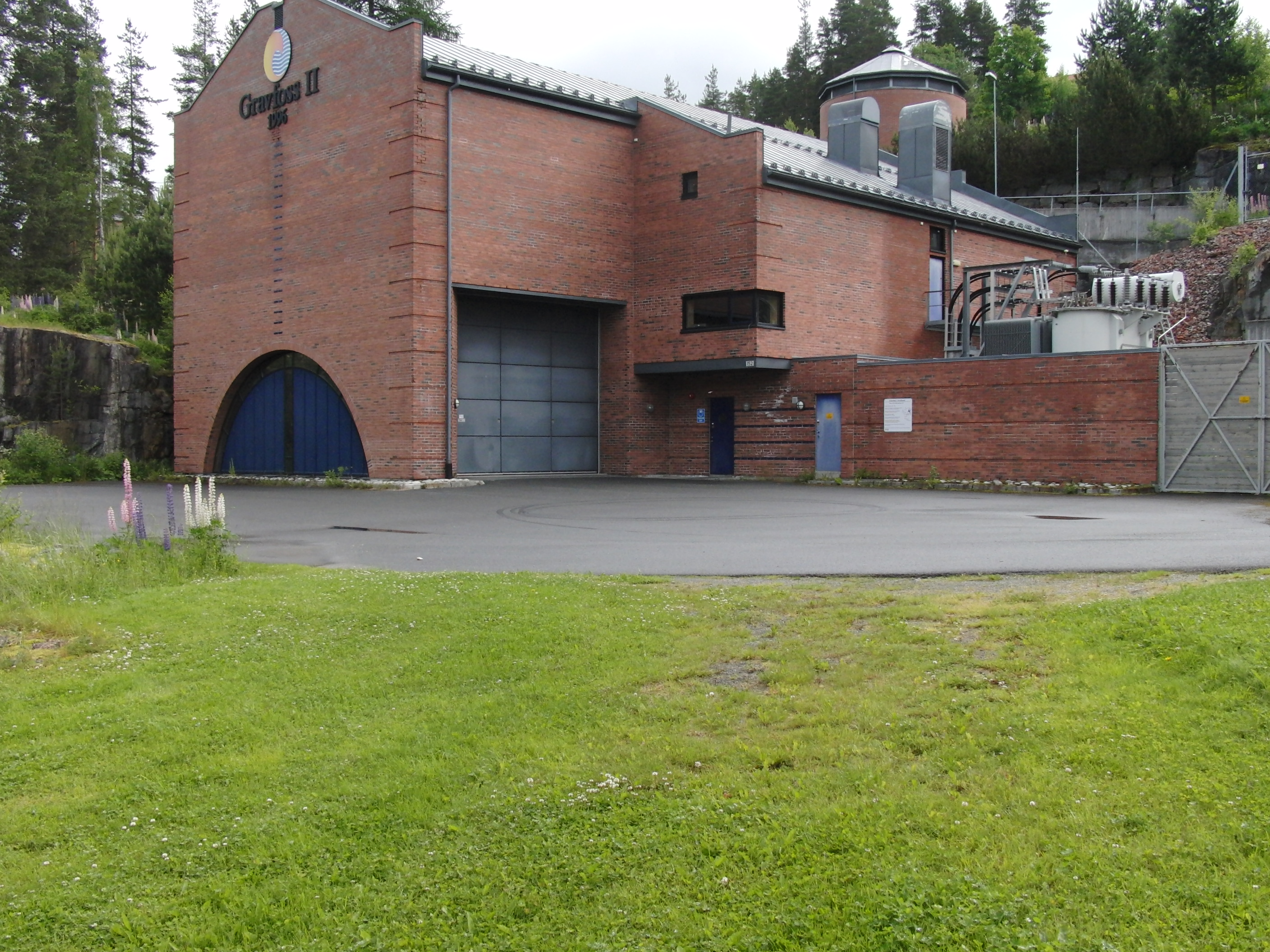
Gravfoss II

The newer power plant, from 1996, uses a head of 20 metres (66 ft). It is equipped with one Kaplan bulb turbine, which produces 30 megawatts (40,000 hp) on the generating unit. Mean annual production is 219 gigawatt-hours (790 TJ).
