= Lands træsliperi og papfabrik =

Norwegian pulp and board factory

- Formerly: Lands Træsliberi (1875–1893)
- Company type: Aksjeselskap
- Industry: Pulp and paperboard
- Founded: 1872
- Defunct: 1962
- Fate: Acquired by Union, then closed
- Headquarters: Fallselva, Søndre Land, Oppland, Norway
- Products: Wood pulp, paperboard

Lands træsliperi og papfabrik was an industrial company that produced wood pulp and paperboard at the Fallselva river in Søndre Land. The company was established in 1872 and closed in 1962.

== Establishment ==
The cousins Edvard Stensrud of Drammen and Hans Odnæs of Fall in Søndre Land were behind this early establishment of a wood-processing plant in Søndre Land. The local historian Bjørn Erik Edvardsen wrote of the founding that Hans Odnæs had the forest, the ground for the factory, and the waterpower, while Edvard Stensrud had the learning and the loan capital behind him. Stensrud and Odnæs began construction work at the Fall farm in 1873.

== Family business ==
It was decided early on to begin with the production of paperboard. Edvard Stensrud had seen the product and its manufacturing process on his travels in Europe in the 1860s, and saw great possibilities for a plant at the Fallselva. For Stensrud it was important that the company stand on more than one footing rather than rely on pulp production alone.

Ownership of the firm remained stable over the years. When one of the founders, Hans Odnæs, died in 1901, he transferred his share in the company to his son Per. Per Odnes took part in running the company, but not with the zeal his father had shown, being more interested in farming. He nonetheless served as chairman of the board until his death in 1940.

Sigurd Odnæs, son of Edvard Stensrud's sister, gradually became the central figure in the company's development. In 1917 he took over his uncle's half of the plant, becoming one of the principal shareholders after the firm was reorganized as a joint-stock company in 1918. Odnæs was involved in several wood-processing firms. From 1912 to 1917 he was operations engineer at Tuna fabrik A/B in Sundsvall, Sweden, and from 1918 to 1925 he was director of Rena Kartonfabrik A/S, where he planned and led the rebuilding of the factory in 1920. He was sole owner of Eskefabrikken Nye Fram A/S from 1924 to 1946 and manager of Norwegian Paper Mill from 1932 to 1939.

== Mergers and ownership changes ==
In 1936 Lands Træsliberi bought its nearest competitor, Skrankefos Træsliberi, which had a capacity of about 10,000 tonnes of wood pulp at the time of acquisition. The management at Land had long seen the advantages of bringing Skrankefos under Land. Soon after the purchase, plans were made to use the power from the mill for operations at Land, and a turbine with generator was installed at Skrankefos to supply the plant at Felloppen. Skrankefos remained part of Land until the firm was closed in 1963.

The family-owned Lands Træsliberi og Papfabrik changed hands in 1962, when the Union group in Skien took over ownership, with Skrankefos Træsliberi included in the deal. Union's takeover was prompted by a halt in operations at Skrankefos and a warned stop in production at Land; the owners of Land and Skrankefos asked Union's principal shareholders whether they might take over the two factories. The wood-processing companies at the Fallselva were closed shortly afterward. For Union it was more important to secure the timber that had gone to Land and Skrankefos than to continue operating the plants, as Union had other companies in the Drammen watercourse that needed their timber quotas.

== Technical development ==
From the founding by Stensrud and Odnæs to Union's takeover in 1962, the plant at the Fallselva underwent a series of expansions and modernizations. The company began with one grinding apparatus with six feeds for billets. The billet was pressed against a grindstone with weights. In addition to the grinding apparatus there were two board machines and a calender, which worked the paper to make it even and smooth. An annex was also built for drying the wood pulp. The equipment was driven by a 150-horsepower turbine and was supplied by Christiania Maskinverksted. In 1886–1888 the plant's capacity was expanded with a new grinding apparatus, a new drying house, and a new turbine. In 1890 Myrens Verksted rebuilt the plant, a project continued by Drammens Jernstøperi in 1898.

From the turn of the century up to the First World War, several further rebuildings and improvements were made. A new sorter was installed in 1905, a new refiner in 1914, and a new turbine pipe in 1915, while new drying houses were built in 1907 and 1915, the latter six stories high.

The truly major improvement came when the management undertook a complete conversion of the plant from cold grinding to hot grinding in 1924/25. The expansion of the mill required more power than the waterfall, Felloppen, could provide, so electric power was leased from Vest-Oppland kommunale Kraftselskap (VOKKS). The rebuilding required not only more power but also considerable financial resources; the improvements were estimated at 315,000 kroner but came to nearly 600,000 kroner before they were finished, a steep increase explained by rising prices and additions for further work along the way. This did not deter the management from continued investment at the Fallselva.

During the Second World War, further improvements and expansions were made. A new barking drum, hollander, and edge runner were acquired, and production began of book board and other special board, including for packing rings. One of the major postwar investments was the purchase of a new board machine in 1959. Bjørn Erik Edvardsen argues that this machine contributed to the factory's closure in 1963, as it required greater uniformity in the wood pulp than the plant could produce.

== Production capacity and raw materials ==
There were considerable capacity improvements at the plant from 1872 to 1963. As built in 1872, the mill had a capacity of 300 tonnes of paperboard a year. In 1887 the factory produced 600 tonnes, and after Myrens Verksted expanded the mill in 1890, continued by Drammens Jernstøperi in 1898, the plant reached a capacity of 1,000–1,200 tonnes of paperboard a year. The company began producing paperboard plates and bowls, the bowls for confectionery becoming a specialty for Land.

The finished products were transported down to Randsfjorden, then carried by boat to Randsfjorden station at the southern end of the lake, and onward to Drammen and Oslo by rail. In winter the board was driven across the ice to Randsfjorden station. When the Valdres Line was built in 1906, the factory gained a direct rail connection.

With the hot-grinding method the company achieved a tougher board better suited to producing the paperboard bowls and cake trays that were in great demand. Much of the plant's output was exported to the European continent and to Argentina.

In the anniversary year 1952, the plant produced 2,500 tonnes of white wood board and 6,000 tonnes of wood pulp, for which it needed three grinding machines, eight board machines, and a driving power of 100 hp plus 600 hp leased from the local power company. Three years before closure, the factory produced 5,000 tonnes of white wood board and beer-coaster board.

The increase in production that followed the many expansions required more timber. The forest Hans Odnæs owned when he helped start the company was not large enough to supply the factory with the necessary raw material, so Odnæs and his partner Stensrud bought more forest. Land also had steady deliveries from 40–50 local forest owners, which secured the company's timber needs, amounting to 10,000 m³ a year in the 1940s and 1950s. The timber was mainly cut in the areas around Trevatn, where the Fallselva has its source, and then floated down to the factory to be stored in the turbine's intake dam, from where it was sent down a chute to the factory site. Through the 1940s and 1950s, more and more of the timber was transported to the mill by truck.

== An important workplace in the rural community ==
The wood-processing industry was a rural industry, with whole local communities engaged in the work at the factory, as at Land and Skrankefos. In Søndre Land the company was a stable employer where the number of jobs rose steadily with the increase in production. In 1920, 40 people worked at the factory, and after the Second World War the number rose to 90. The attitude in the local community was that whoever found work at the factory kept the job and saw it as a better way to make a living than forestry or farming, and generation after generation sought work there.

The management had an almost paternal relationship with the workers. In time the relationship between workers and management was regulated through employers' associations and trade unions. Lands fagforening was founded in 1919 as branch no. 61 in the Norwegian Paper Industry Workers' Union, and was dissolved together with the company in 1962.

== Archival material ==
In private archive 617 in the National Archives, that of the Paper Industry's Central Federation (PSF), box 121 contains material from Lands Træsliperi og Papfabrik.

Lands Museum in Dokka holds archival material from Skrankefoss Træsliperi and Lands Træsliperi og Papfabrik. No archive lists have been made of the material, which amounts to about one shelf-meter for the two companies together, most of it created by Lands Træsliperi og Papfabrik. Lands Museum has no material from Lands fagforening.

No archives from any union at Lands Træsliperi og Papfabrik have been deposited with the Labour Movement Archives and Library. In the archive of the Norwegian Paper Industry Workers' Union there is material from branch 61, Lands fagforening, box 153.

== Bibliography ==
- Bjørlien, Ole Helmer Engelien (1994). «Skogbrukshistorie for Land.» Boka om Land, vol. 6, Lands Museum, pp. 399–405.
- Edvardsen, Bjørn Erik (2002). «Kulturstien ved Fallselva». Landingen. Årbok for Lands Museum. Land.
- Kaldal, Ingar (1989). Papirarbeidernes historie. Norsk Papirindustriarbeiderforbund 1913–1988. Oslo, pp. 297, 587.
- Pryser, Thoralf (1952). Lands Træsliperi og Papirfabrik gjennom 80 år 1872–1952. Oslo.
- Strømme Svendsen, Arnljot (1973). Union 1873–1973. En norsk treforedlingsbedrifts liv og eksistenskamp. Oslo, p. 228.
- Ødegaard, N. (1918). Kristians amt 1814–1914. En kort oversigt. Kristiania, p. 278.

=== Archival material ===
- National Archives, Oslo (private archive 617, Papirindustriens Sentralforbund, box 121)
- Lands Museum, Dokka
- Labour Movement Archives and Library, Oslo (Norsk Papirindustriarbeiderforbund, branch 61, box 153)
