= Holmen Church (Sigdal) =

Church in Buskerud, Norway

- Holmen kirke Sigdal Church
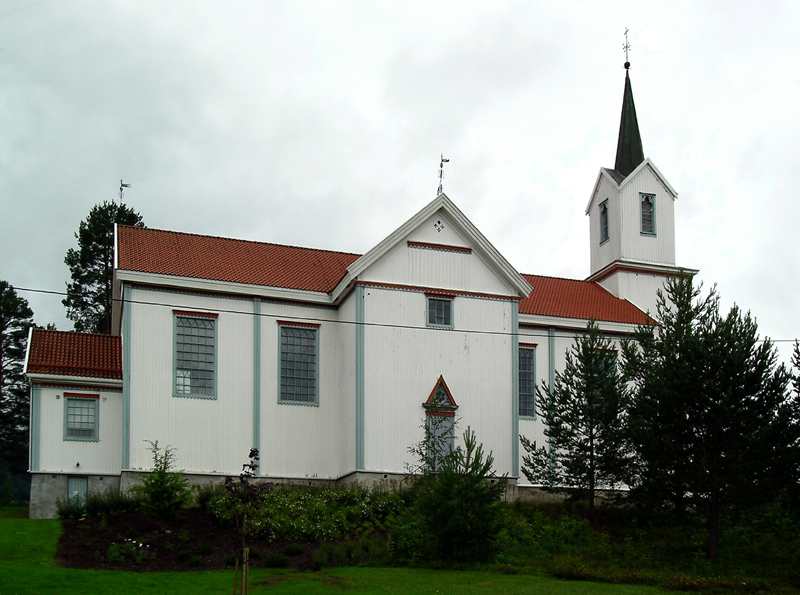
- View of the church
- Holmen Church
- 60°02′46″N 9°37′57″E
- Location: Sigdal, Buskerud
- Country: Norway
- Denomination: Church of Norway
- Previous denomination: Catholic Church
- Churchmanship: Evangelical Lutheran

History
- Status: Parish church
- Founded: 13th century
- Consecrated: 9 Nov 1853

Architecture
- Functional status: Active
- Architect: Gustav Adolph Lammers
- Architectural type: Cruciform
- Completed: 1853 (173 years ago)

Specifications
- Capacity: 700
- Materials: Wood

Administration
- Diocese: Tunsberg
- Deanery: Eiker prosti
- Parish: Sigdal
- Norwegian Cultural Heritage Site
- Type: Church
- Status: Listed
- ID: 85426

Holmen Church (Norwegian: Holmen kirke) is a parish church of the Church of Norway in Sigdal Municipality in Buskerud county, Norway. It is located in the village of Prestfoss. It is one of the churches for the Sigdal parish which is part of the Eiker prosti (deanery) in the Diocese of Tunsberg. The white, wooden church was built in a cruciform design in 1853 using plans drawn up by the architect Gustav Adolph Lammers. The church seats about 700 people. Holmen Church is situated on a rocky mound with deciduous forest on the north side of the river Simoa. Access to the church is via Fv133 and Rv287.

== History ==
The earliest existing historical records of the church date back to the year 1370, but the church was not built that year. The first church here was a wooden stave church that was likely built during the 13th century. This church was located about 500 metres (1,600 ft) northeast of the present-day church. This church featured a square nave and a narrower, nearly square chancel with an apse on the end of the building.

In the 1600s, the stave church was extensively altered in a series of renovations and expansions. In 1616, the church had a rectangular nave and a narrower choir. In 1628, the nave was extended to the west by about 6.2 metres (20 ft). The choir was probably demolished around the middle of the 17th century and replaced with a wooden choir the same width as the nave. In 1651, a new timber-framed tower was built. During an inspection in 1673, the church still had open-air hallways around the exterior of the building, but these were gone in 1688. The church was expanded into a cruciform design during the 18th century. The church, like most other churches in Norway, was sold into private ownership during the Norwegian church sale in 1723 to help the King pay off war debts. In an inspection in 1724, the choir was stated to be about 4.4 metres (14 ft) square and the nave was 12.4 by 6.2 metres (41 ft × 20 ft). A description written by the parish priest Jens Krogh Stub indicates that the different parts of the building did not fit together architecturally. The only known illustration of the old stave building was a drawing made by the priest's daughter Kaja Stub in 1845.

In 1814, this church served as an election church (Norwegian: valgkirke). Together with more than 300 other parish churches across Norway, it was a polling station for elections to the 1814 Norwegian Constituent Assembly which wrote the Constitution of Norway. This was Norway's first national election. Each church parish was a constituency that elected people called "electors" who later met together in each county to elect the representatives for the assembly that was to meet at Eidsvoll Manor later that year.

In the 1840s, the church was deemed to be in very poor condition and it was decided to replace the church with a new building on a site about 500 metres (1,600 ft) to the southwest in the village of Prestfoss and the old church was torn down in 1855. The new church was built in from 1850-1853 using designs drawn by Gustav Adolph Lammers (1802–1878) based upon his designs for Bamble Church in Telemark county. The new wooden cruciform church seated about 700 people and it was consecrated on 9 November 1853 by Jens Lauritz Arup, Bishop of Oslo. The closing hymn of the consecration service was written by Jørgen Moe, the resident chaplain at Olberg Church in Krødsherad, who later became Bishop in the Diocese of Agder.

The pulpit and baptismal font from the stave church are used in Holmen Church. The altarpiece was painted by Axel Ender (1853-1920) and dates from 1877. It features the Crucifixion of Jesus. Two bells in the tower are both cast by O. Olsen & Søn klokkestøperi in Tønsberg. They date from 1853 and 1856. The organ is from Hammarbergs Orgelbyggeri and was built in 1984.

== Media gallery ==
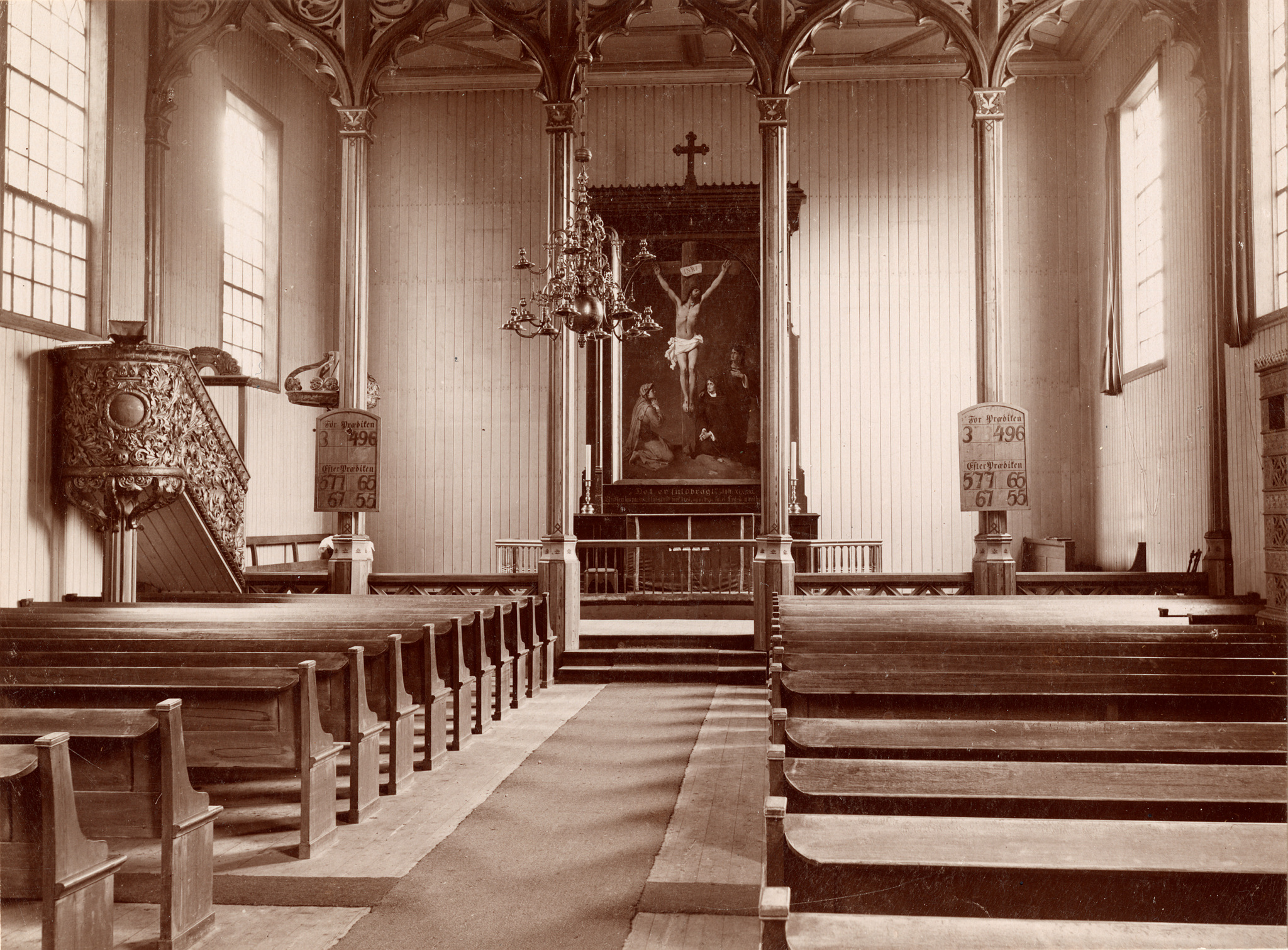
Interior of the current building

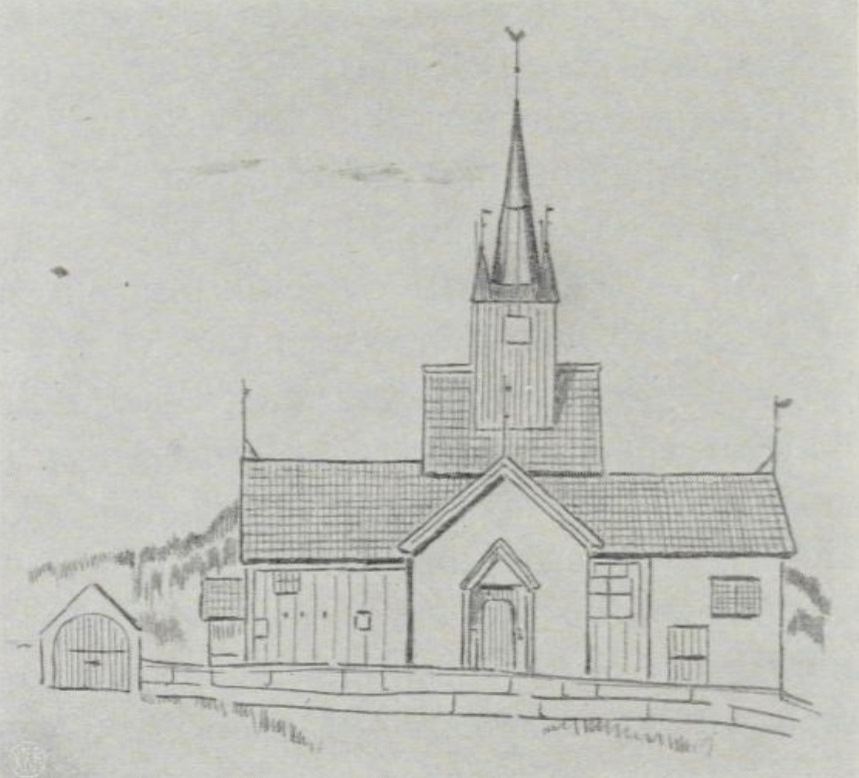
Exterior of the old building

Churchyard

== See also ==
- List of churches in Tunsberg
