= Hellefoss =

Norwegian paper company

Hellefoss Book Paper AS
- Formerly: Holmen-Hellefos AS; Borregaard Hellefos AS; Hellefoss AS; Hellefoss Paper AS;
- Type: Aksjeselskap
- Industry: Pulp and paper
- Founded: 1898
- Headquarters: Hokksund, Øvre Eiker Municipality, Buskerud, Norway
- Products: Newsprint, book paper, wood pulp
- Website: hellefoss.com

Hellefoss is a Norwegian industrial company in Hokksund that produces paper at the Hellefossen waterfall in the Drammen River. The paper factory was established in 1883 and the wood-grinding mill in 1889. The wood-processing company Hellefoss AS originated in the 1898 merger of Hellefos Træsliberi in Hokksund in Øvre Eiker Municipality and Holmen Papirfabrik in Drammen Municipality, which produced the company Holmen-Hellefos. The company first produced newsprint from wood pulp, and from the 1970s book paper.

== History ==
=== Two faltering companies seek cooperation ===
Hellefos Træsliberi was built in 1889 at the lowest of the waterfalls in the Drammen River. The timber merchant Ole Haugan established the company together with the engineer Lars Lysgaard and the timber merchant Anders J. Aas. Haugan ran the timber firm Ole Haugan & Co in Drammen. The wood-grinding mill at Hellefossen began with a share capital of 180,000 kroner, and Haugan later bought out the ownership stakes of Aas and Lysgaard. With the equipment installed in 1889, the mill produced 5,000 tonnes of 50 percent wet wood pulp a year, and by 1891 it employed 30 people.

The other partner in the merger, Holmen Papirfabrik in Drammen, was founded in 1883. It was an uncombined company that carried out only paper production, with much of its wood pulp supplied by Labro Træsliberi near Kongsberg. In 1898 Holmen Papirfabrik was the only uncombined wood-processing company in the Drammen district.

Through the 1890s, both companies struggled to survive on their own. Holmen Papirfabrik came close to collapse in the spring of 1898, lacking the finances to integrate wood pulp and paper production. Ole Haugan fared no better in Øvre Eiker; the large expansion projects he began at the Hellefossen mill in 1897 nearly ruined him financially. In this situation, the industry minister Georg Thilesen of Drammen initiated a rescue operation.

=== Merger in 1898 ===
The new company Holmen-Hellefos took over both the paper factory and the mill. It planned to raise a share capital of three million kroner and move the paper machine from Drammen to Hokksund, but the share capital could not be fully subscribed, and the move was postponed. The company's finances were so weak that paper production in Drammen stopped entirely from 1899 to 1905, and the mill received all of its effort in the first years after the merger.

Apart from a setback in 1908–1909, Holmen-Hellefos prospered until the outbreak of the First World War in 1914, which allowed it to modernize. Paper production, idle since 1899, resumed in 1906 with a new machine bought from the United States, and the company committed fully to newsprint. The high wood-pulp content of newsprint suited Holmen-Hellefos, as the mill in Øvre Eiker could supply most of the raw material the Drammen factory needed, making the company less dependent on market prices for wood pulp.

=== Times of crisis and new owners ===
During the First World War the company faced serious financial difficulties that ended in refinancing and new ownership. The earlier plan to move the paper machine to Hellefoss was revived and carried out in 1917, uniting wood pulp and paper production in one place. The industry recovered in the years after the war, and about 150 workers were employed at the factory during that period.

Economic conditions in the industry shifted abruptly, and difficulties mounted in the early 1920s. As a result, Den norske Creditbank (DnC) became the largest owner of Holmen-Hellefos in 1922. Although the company struggled through the interwar recession and, like other producers, saw declining sales and reduced output, it fared better than many of its competitors. In 1932 it produced 7,000 tonnes of newsprint and 12,000 tonnes of wood pulp, down from 12,000 tonnes of paper and just over 20,000 tonnes of 50 percent wet wood pulp in 1930. The low point came in 1934.

Conditions eventually improved enough to justify new investment. In 1937 both the wood-grinding mill and the paper machine were modernized, raising output so that annual production reached nearly 30,000 tonnes of wood pulp and 17,000 tonnes of paper by 1940.

The Second World War brought long production stoppages and general standstill. Den norske Creditbank withdrew from the company, and in 1942 Norsk Elektrokemisk Aktieselskap (NEA) took it over. Sigurd Rinde and Thorvald Johnsen Jr. were the central figures in NEA, with Rinde as director. NEA had also acquired the wood-grinding mills Vafos in Sannidal and Trælandsfos near Flekkefjord. NEA held the largest stake, but the Rinde family, the manager Erichsen, Bjarne Frang, Thorvald Johnsen, and other small shareholders also held shares. After the war, Rinde bought NEA's stake in Holmen-Hellefos and later Erichsen's as well, becoming the dominant owner.

=== Boom, rationalization, and book paper production ===
The postwar years brought an upturn for the industry, and Holmen-Hellefos shared in it, with new hires, investment, and improvements continuing up to 1970. The company began the period by converting the factory from steam to electric power and overhauling the old 1905 paper machine on every point. When new, the machine had run at about 12 m/min; by the 1930s it reached 200 m/min, and in 1970 it reached 350 m/min.

The stability of the 1960s did not last. About 160 people worked at the company at the start of the 1970s, but conditions in the industry grew harder over the decade, and Holmen-Hellefos had to adapt to secure its future. Unable to continue with newsprint, the management turned to paper for paperbacks and other inexpensive books. The strategy succeeded, and the company avoided the largest staff cuts.

At the beginning of the 1980s the company employed 140 people. According to Bent Ek, recognizing the situation early and beginning to restructure made Holmen-Hellefos one of the very few wood-processing companies to survive the major structural crisis of the 1970s and 1980s. An extensive rebuilding of the paper machine began in 1986, increasing both speed and output, and further improvements through the 1990s brought the machine to 500 m/min and annual production above 40,000 tonnes by 1995. In 2004 the company produced 50,000 tonnes of book paper with 110 employees.

The company's ownership also changed in the 1980s. Orkla acquired two-thirds of the shares in NEA in 1983, and in 1986 Orkla merged with Borregaard, bringing the family-owned Holmen-Hellefos into a large corporation after more than 40 years of Rinde family control. The company became Borregaard-Hellefos in 1992. In 2004 Borregaard sold it to Hellevad AS, which also bought Borregaard Vafos AS near Kragerø. Hellefoss went bankrupt in 2013 but resumed operations the same year under new owners as Hellefoss Paper. In 2024 the company changed its name to Hellefoss Book Paper.

=== Trade unions ===
Many trade unions formed in the wood-processing industry of the Drammen watercourse in 1906, with 15 established in the Drammen district between January and May. Before forming a union, the workers at Hellefos Træsliberi had set up a sick fund. Hellefos Fagforening was founded on 11 February 1906 and received branch number 38 in the Norwegian Paper Industry Workers' Union, and Holmen Papirarbeiderforening was founded that March.

== Bibliography ==
- Ek, Bent (1998). Fabrikken ved Hellefossen. Borregaard Hellefos 1898–1998. Hokksund.
- Ek, Bent (1997). «Hundre år med treforedling ved Hellefossen». Eikerminne.
- Ek, Bent (1991). Treforedlingsindustrien i Drammensvassdraget 1870–1920, hovedfagsoppgave i historie. Oslo.
- Erichsen, Erik Chr. (1948). Aktieselskabet Holmen-Hellefos: 50 år. 1898–1948. Hokksund.
- Kaldal, Ingar (1989). Papirarbeidernes historie. Norsk Papirindustriarbeiderforbund 1913–1988. Oslo.
