= Mjøndalen Church =

Church in Buskerud, Norway

- Mjøndalen kirke
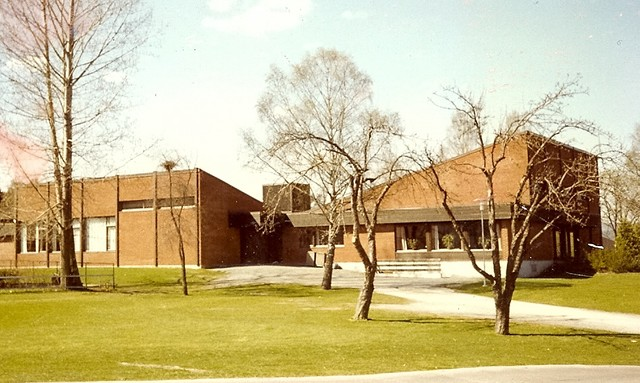
- View of the church
- Mjøndalen Church
- 59°44′52″N 10°00′23″E
- Location: Drammen Municipality, Buskerud
- Country: Norway
- Denomination: Church of Norway
- Churchmanship: Evangelical Lutheran

History
- Status: Parish church
- Founded: 1983
- Consecrated: 1983

Architecture
- Functional status: Active
- Architect: Elisabet Fidjestøl
- Architectural type: Rectangular
- Completed: 1983 (43 years ago)

Specifications
- Capacity: 380
- Materials: Brick

Administration
- Diocese: Tunsberg bispedømme
- Deanery: Drammen og Lier prosti
- Parish: Mjøndalen

Mjøndalen Church (Norwegian: Mjøndalen kirke) is a parish church of the Church of Norway in Drammen Municipality in Buskerud county, Norway. It is located in Mjøndalen. It is the church for the Mjøndalen parish which is part of the Drammen og Lier prosti (deanery) in the Diocese of Tunsberg. The red brick church was built in a rectangular design in 1983 using plans drawn up by the architect Elisabet Fidjestøl. The church seats about 380 people.

== History ==
The church was designed by Elisabet Fidjestøl and built of brick and wood. It was consecrated in 1983. The building houses the main sanctuary, offices, a small chapel, a youth hall, a fireplace room, group rooms, and a kitchen. A new brick bell tower was completed in 2020. The Mjøndalen Church cemetery is located on the south side of the Drammenselva River, about 2 kilometres (1.2 mi) east of the church.

== See also ==
- List of churches in Tunsberg
