= Olberg Church =

Church in Buskerud, Norway

- Olberg kirke
- View of the church
- Olberg Church
- 60°10′16″N 9°38′13″E
- Location: Krødsherad, Buskerud
- Country: Norway
- Denomination: Church of Norway
- Previous denomination: Catholic Church
- Churchmanship: Evangelical Lutheran

History
- Status: Parish church
- Founded: 11th century
- Consecrated: 1859

Architecture
- Functional status: Active
- Architect: G.A. Lammers
- Architectural type: Cruciform
- Completed: 1859 (167 years ago)

Specifications
- Capacity: 600
- Materials: Wood

Administration
- Diocese: Tunsberg
- Deanery: Eiker prosti
- Parish: Krødsherad
- Norwegian Cultural Heritage Site
- Type: Church
- Status: Listed
- ID: 84845

Olberg Church (Norwegian: Olberg kirke) is a parish church of the Church of Norway in Krødsherad Municipality in Buskerud county, Norway. It is located in the village of Noresund. It is one of the churches for the Krødsherad parish which is part of the Eiker prosti (deanery) in the Diocese of Tunsberg. The white, wooden church was built in a cruciform design in 1859 using plans drawn up by the architect Gustav Adolph Lammers. The church seats about 600 people.

== History ==
The earliest existing historical records of the church date back to the year 1389, but the church was not built that year. It is not known exactly when the first church was built there, but some claim that there were two churches on Olberg before the current church was built. The first is said to have been a wooden stave church built on a former pagan shrine immediately after Christianity was adopted in the area in the years after 1050. This church is said to have been dedicated to Saint Olav and it was in use for around 150 years.

Around the year 1200 a new stave church was built at Olberg. The church nave measured 5.6 by 5 metres (18 ft × 16 ft) plus a small chancel. It was located a little closer to the lake than today's church. Over time, the church was enlarged several times. By 1699, it no longer resembled a traditional stave church, but it had been enlarged by adding transepts to give it a cruciform design. The church, like most other churches in Norway, was sold into private ownership during the Norwegian church sale in 1723 to help the King pay off war debts. It was bought by a high-ranking official named Lars Moss. Later that year, Iver Olsen Kolsrud bought all the churches in Sigdal prestegjeld and he restored the old church. After his death in 1777, the church was sold to the local residents of the area.

In the 1850s, the need for a new church arose and discussions began. There was some talk for a while of using modified versions of the drawings for Bamble Church, as had been done for the nearby Holmen Church in Prestfoss shortly before. However, the newly appointed chaplain Jørgen Moe contacted Heinrich Ernst Schirmer and he made designs for the new Olberg Church. When the price estimate for this turned out to be too high, they went back to the drawings for Bamble Church which were drawn up by Gustav Adolph Lammers. Ultimately the new church was built based on modified drawings of the Bamble Church. Construction took place in 1857–1859 on a site just north of the old church. The new church was consecrated on 19 October 1859. The old stave church was torn down soon after the new church was completed.

The new Olberg Church is a wooden cruciform church with a west tower. The tower is timber-framed, while the rest of the church is made of log construction. There is a sacristy in the eastern extension (with an entrance behind the altarpiece). The transepts are short and contain seating galleries on two floors, so that the church has five galleries including the organ gallery in the west.

== Media gallery ==
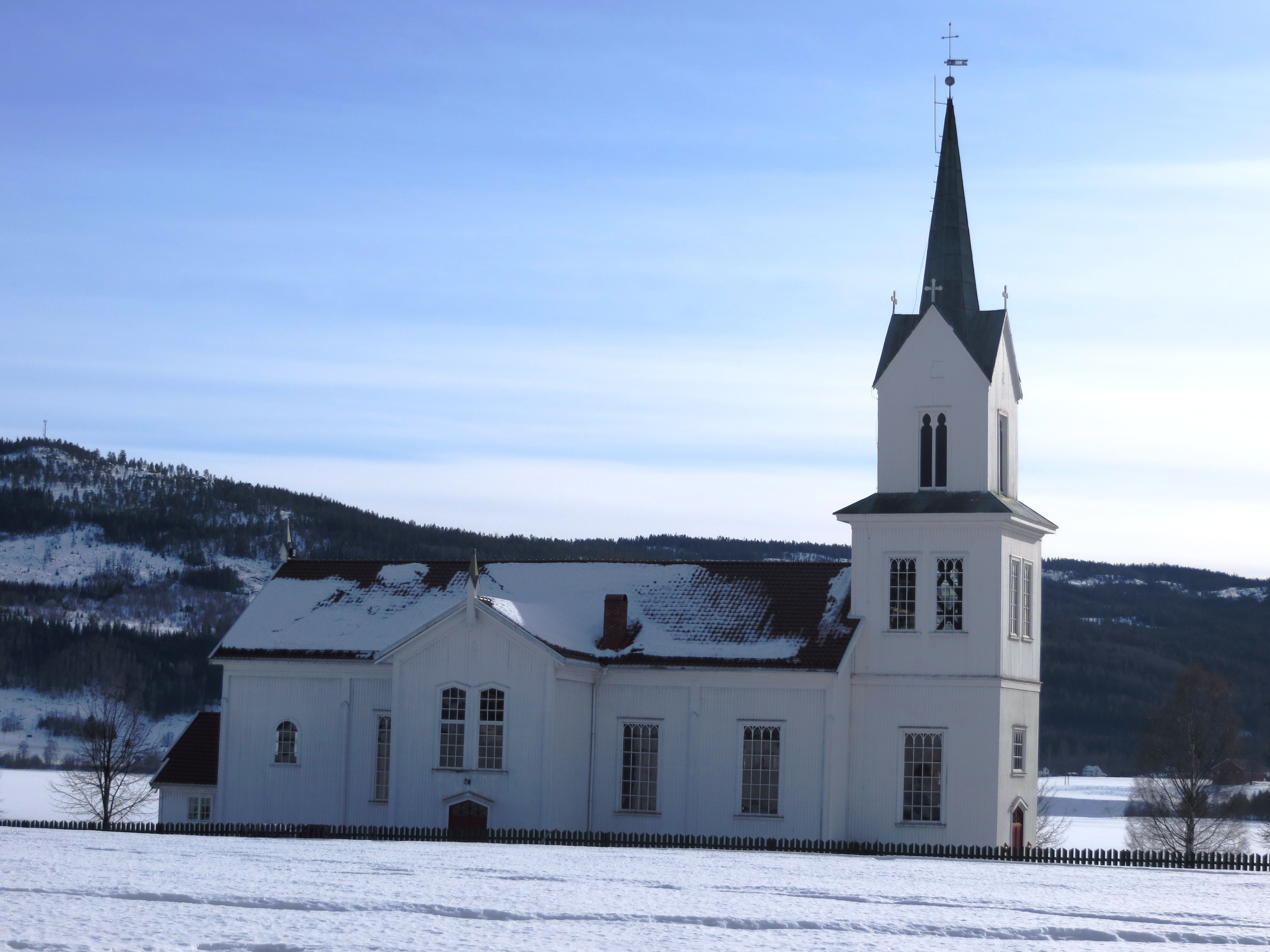

== See also ==
- List of churches in Tunsberg
