= A/S Skrankefoss Træsliperi =

Norwegian wood pulp company

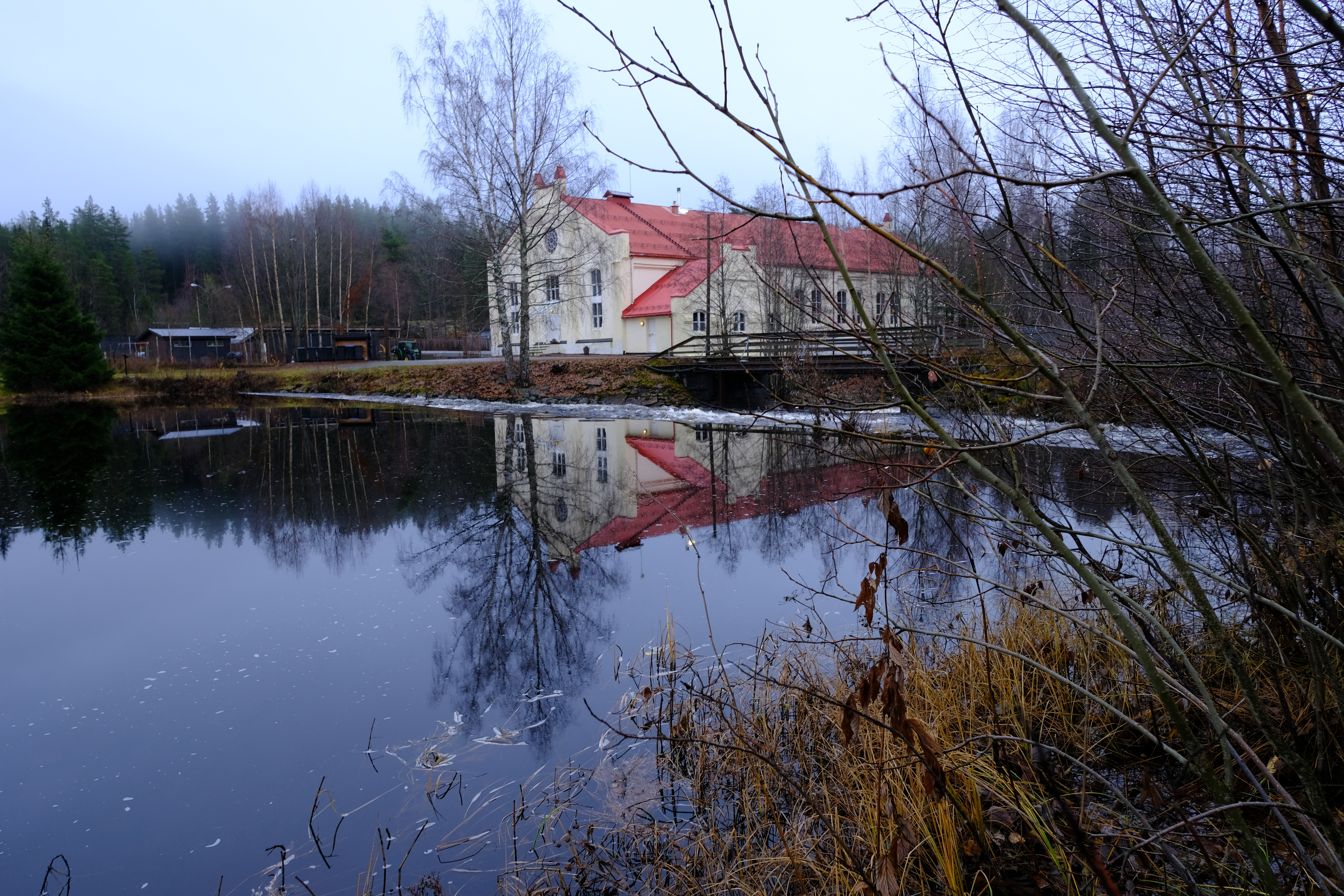
- Company type: Aksjeselskap
- Industry: Wood pulp
- Founded: 1910
- Defunct: 1962
- Fate: Acquired by Union, then closed
- Headquarters: Fallselva, Søndre Land, Oppland, Norway
- Products: Wood pulp

A/S Skrankefoss Træsliperi was an industrial company that produced wood pulp at the Fallselva river in Søndre Land. The company was established in 1910 and closed in 1962.

== History ==
The barrister Hans A. Eid initiated the founding of Skrankefos Træsliberi. The mill was built at Skrankefossen in the Fallselva, a little higher up the same watercourse as Lands Træsliberi og Papfabrik. Eid brought several forest owners along the Fallselva on board and began building the mill in 1910, becoming the firm's manager.

The founding can be seen against the background of the good prices for wood pulp at the start of the 20th century. The last wood-grinding mills in the Drammen watercourse were built during this upturn, and Skrankefoss was part of this final wave of establishment.

Soon after Skrankefoss was founded, wood pulp prices fell from 40 to 30 kroner per tonne, which affected the prospects at several plants. Despite the drop, exports rose over the period from 1900 to 1915 taken as a whole, from 295,000 tonnes to 520,000 tonnes. Much of this increase came from improvements to existing plants, but also from new ones such as Skrankefoss.

The mill established at Skrankefossen in 1910 had a capacity of 5,000–6,000 tonnes of wood pulp a year. Capacity was gradually expanded, reaching 7,000 tonnes a year by the end of the First World War. As at the neighboring company Land, an extensive modernization was carried out in 1924–1925, and production figures at the start of the 1930s show that this improvement allowed the mill to produce 13,500 tonnes a year. Production at Skrankefoss thus doubled over a decade. Such output required two water turbines that together produced 1,000 hp; in the 1950s the turbines were replaced with motor power.

== Economic difficulties in the interwar period ==
Despite the increase in production after the First World War, Skrankefoss, like most other wood pulp companies, ran into considerable problems. Rising timber prices, turmoil in the currency market, and not least substantial competition from Canadian pulp producers worsened operating results. The situation was especially demanding for the pure pulp producers, which did not use the pulp for their own board or paper production. Through the 1920s the Norwegian krone rose against foreign currencies, so the export value of Norwegian wood pulp fell correspondingly, and the companies lost money.

The relationship between Lands Træsliberi og Papfabrik and Skrankefoss Træsliperi was also difficult. The water flow in the Fallselva and the competition for timber and labor repeatedly brought the two neighboring companies into conflict, and they eventually went to court to settle their rights in the Fallselva.

== Bankruptcy and new owners ==
Through the 1930s the economic problems at Skrankefoss became insurmountable. Operations were halted in 1931, and the following year the firm was declared bankrupt. A new company, Det Nye A/S Skrankefoss Tresliperi, was attempted, but operations never began. This opened the way for Lands Træsliberi og Papfabrik to take over the factory, and the owners of Land, led by Sigurd Odnæs, bought Skrankefoss in 1936, taming the troublesome neighbor. Even under Land's wing, operations at Skrankefoss lay idle for several years, resuming in 1946 after having stood still since the early 1930s.

Ownership of Skrankefoss changed again only when Union in Skien bought up Lands Træsliberi in 1962 and Skrankefoss came along with it. The main reason Union took an interest in the two wood-processing companies in Søndre Land was the forest resources that came with them. The Union group had not bought up companies on a large scale since the 1920s, so the acquisition of Land and Skrankefoss was an exception.

As at Land, the whole local community was engaged in the work at the factory, and the villagers preferred working there to farming or forestry. Operations at Skrankefoss stopped at the turn of the year 1961–1962, while at Land the wheels were kept turning through the end of 1962. After the two key companies at the Fallselva closed, the wood-processing industry in the area was finished, and many had to take up commuting and barracks life in Oslo.

== Bibliography ==
- Bjørlien, Ole Helmer Engelien (1994). «Skogbrukshistorie for Land.» Boka om Land, vol. 6, Lands Museum, pp. 399–405.
- Edvardsen, Bjørn Erik (2002). «Kulturstien ved Fallselva». Landingen. Årbok for Lands Museum. Land.
- Kaldal, Ingar (1989). Papirarbeidernes historie. Norsk Papirindustriarbeiderforbund 1913–1988. Oslo, p. 297.
- Moen, Eli (1993). Modum – ei bygd med tre elver. Industrialiseringen av ei østlandsbygd 1870–1940. Modum, pp. 165, 169, 171, 317.
- Ødegaard, N. (1918). Kristians amt 1814–1914. En kort oversigt. Kristiania, p. 278.
