= Haugfoss =

Waterfall in Modum, Norway

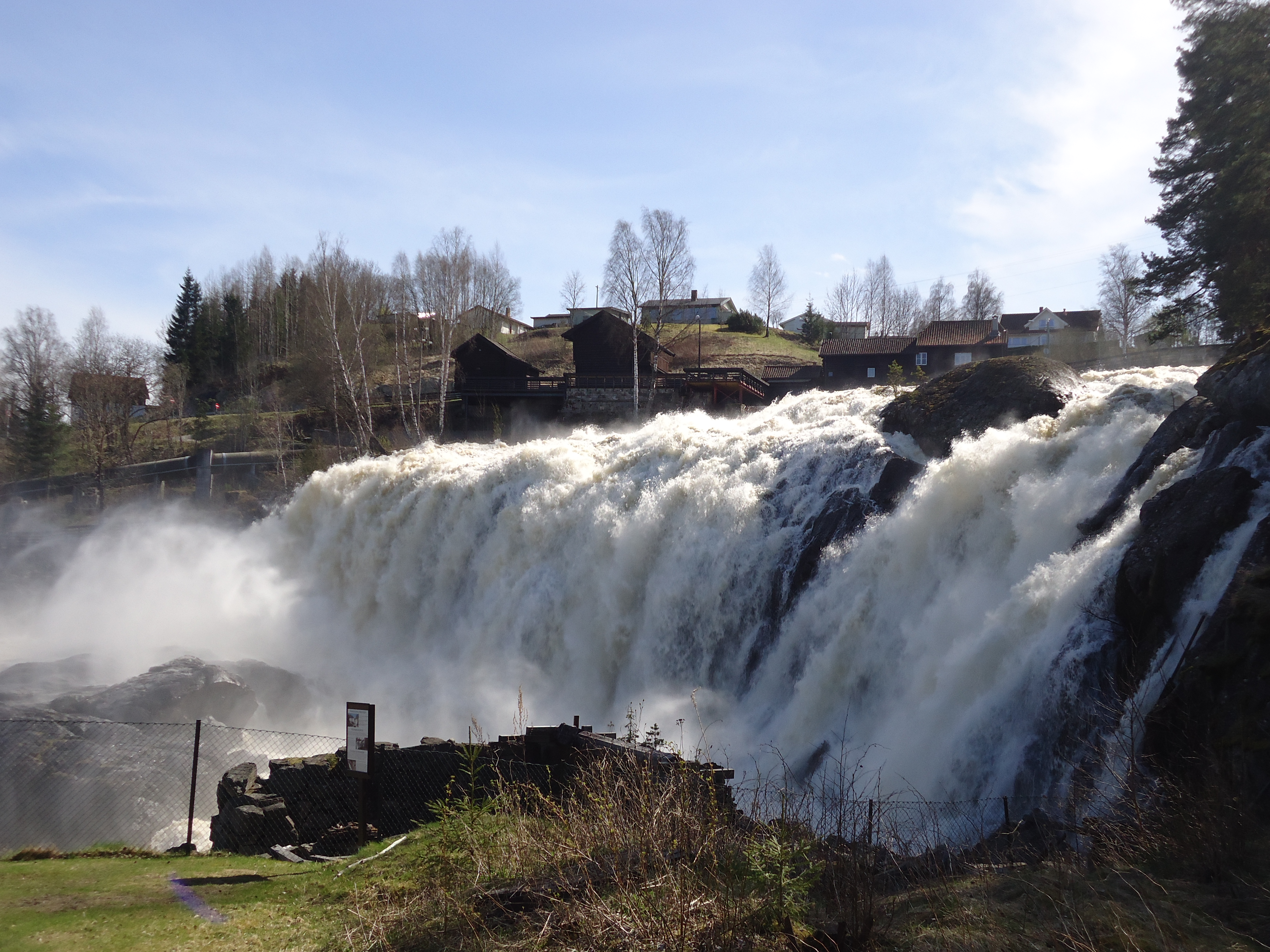
- Interactive map of Haugfoss
- Location: Modum, Buskerud, Norway
- Coordinates: 59°54′50″N 9°52′59″E
- Total height: 37 m (121 ft)
- Watercourse: Simoa

Haugfoss (also Haugfossen) is a waterfall in the Simoa, a tributary of the Drammen River, in Modum municipality, Buskerud county.

It has been used among other things to power Modum Blaafarveværk, which lies just below the waterfall, and from 1894 to 1926 the wood pulp company Haugfoss Træsliperi produced wood pulp at the fall. The waterfall is now used in the Haugfoss power station, which has a maximum output of 3.6 MW and an average annual production of 16.5 GWh; the head is 37 meters.

South of the waterfall is a small settlement with 239 inhabitants (2019). It lies along county road 287, which runs from national road 350 in Åmot through Sigdal to Bromma on national road 7 through Hallingdal.
