= Åmot, Buskerud =

Coordinates: 59°53′35″N 9°55′35″E

Åmot
- Village
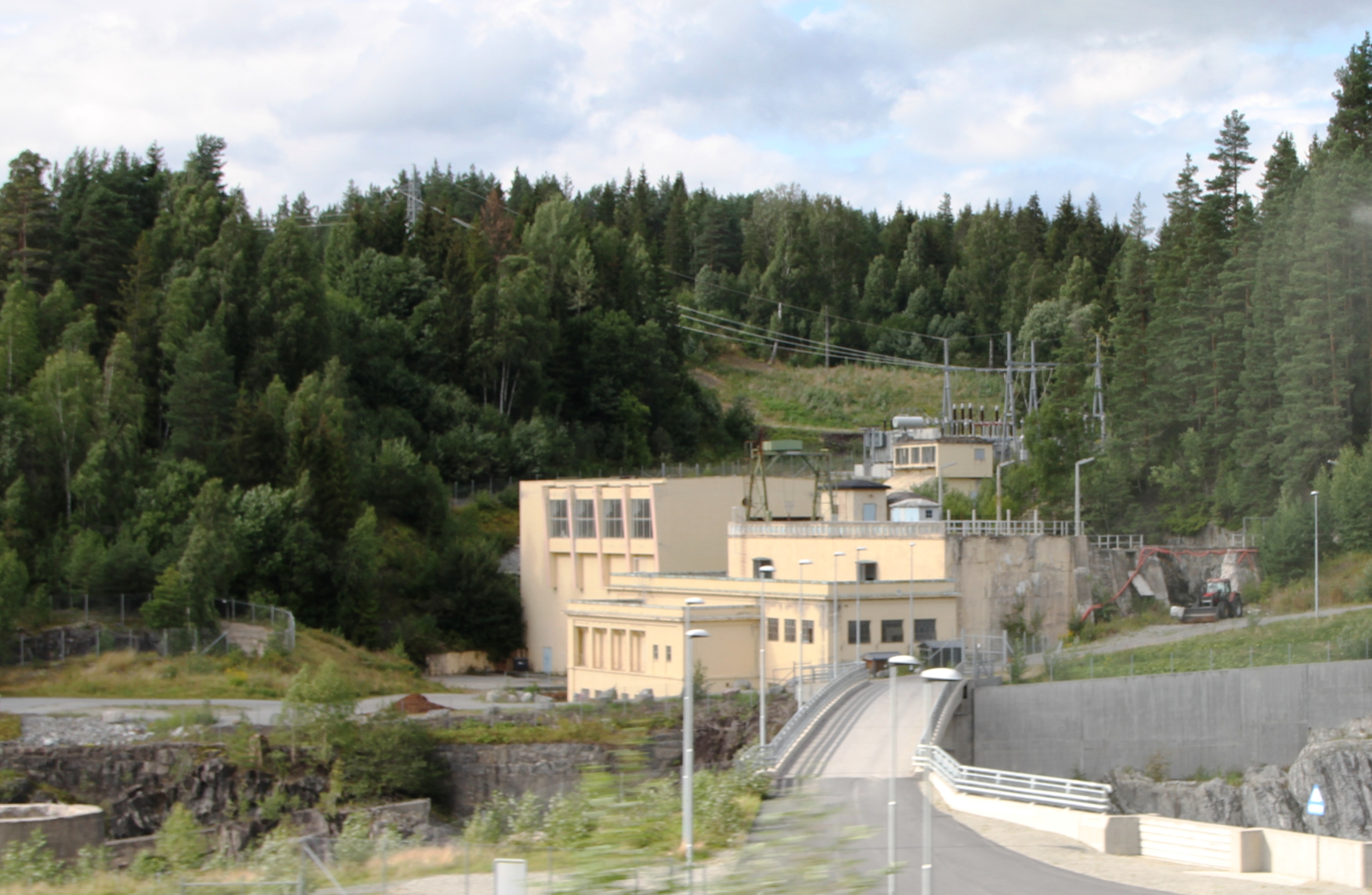
- Embretsfoss kraftverk
- Interactive map of Åmot
- Country: Norway
- Region: Østlandet
- County: Buskerud
- Time zone: UTC+01:00 (CET)
  - Summer (DST): UTC+02:00 (CEST)

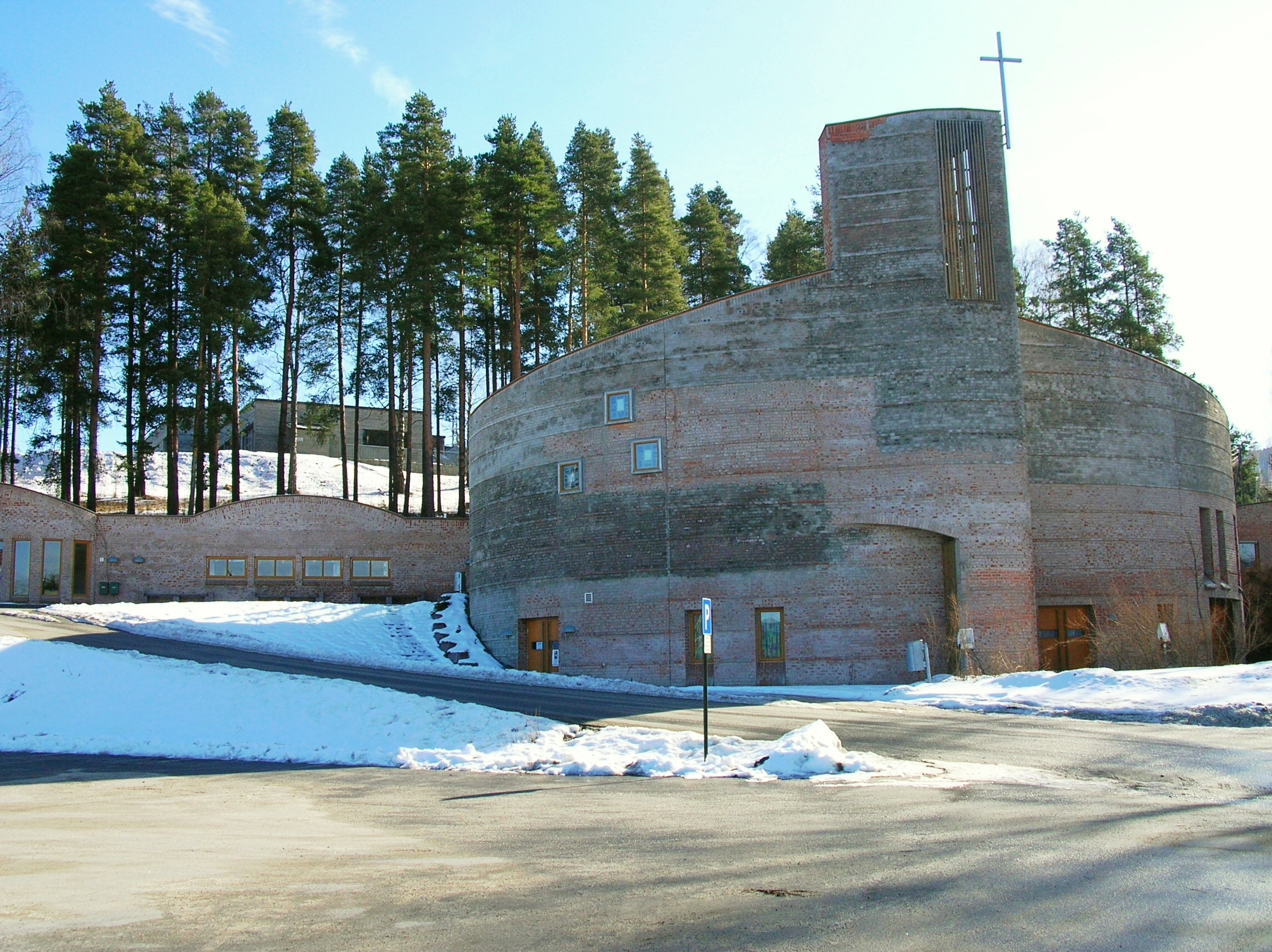
Åmot Church in Modum

Åmot is a village in Modum municipality in Buskerud, Norway. Located just south of Geithus, the two villages have grown closer to each other. They have a combined population of 5,694.

== History ==
Four waterfalls (Embretsfoss, Døvikfoss, Kongsfoss and Haugfoss) in the immediate vicinity have contributed greatly to the industrial history of Åmot. These waterfalls have served to power several hydroelectric plants. Kongsfoss kraftverk is a hydroelectric power plant first built in 1920. The present power plant was put into operation in 2004, utilizes waterfall from Kongsfoss on the Simoa. Embretsfoss kraftverk was first put into operation in 1916, and utilizes the waterfall at Embretfoss on the Drammenselva. Additional power plants were added in 1921, 1954 and 2013. Haugfoss kraftverk is a hydroelectric power plant which utilizes waterfall from the Haugfoss on the Simoa. The plant was first built in 1938 and modified in 1988. Døvikfoss kraftverk, which was put into operation in 1975, is powered by the waterfall from Døvikfoss on the Drammenselva.

== Åmot Church ==
Åmot Church (Åmot kirke) was consecrated on May 16, 1996. It replaced a chapel, dating from 1906, which was destroyed by fire. Åmot Church belongs to the Modum parish in Eiker deanery. The church was constructed of brick and seats 220 in the nave.
