= Hellefossen =

Waterfall in Buskerud, Norway

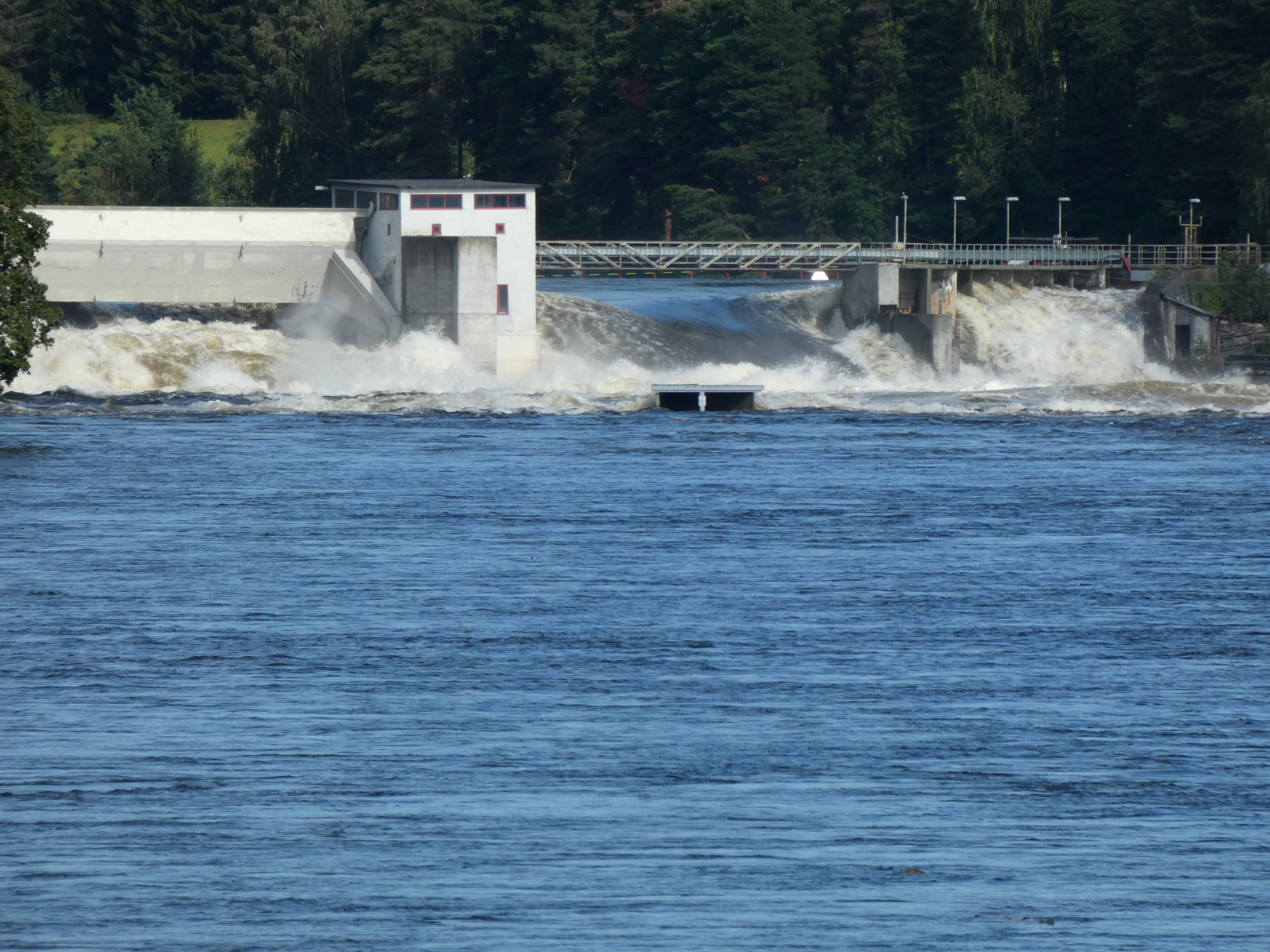
- Interactive map of Hellefossen
- Location: Øvre Eiker, Buskerud, Norway
- Coordinates: 59.7872°N 9.8997°E
- Total height: 5 m (16 ft)
- Watercourse: Drammen River

Hellefossen (also Hellefoss) is an originally five-meter-high waterfall in the Drammen River, the lowest in the watercourse. It lies north of Hokksund in Øvre Eiker municipality, Buskerud county.

Hellefossen is mentioned as early as 1386 (Hellefossen). Nearby stood Helgehus, probably a chapel from that time. The large salmon fishery in the river originally belonged to Haug Church at Hokksund.

The paper mill Hellefoss Paper stands on the site. The waterfall's hydroelectric power is used in the Holmen-Hellefoss power station, which has 11 MW of installed capacity and an average annual production of 81 GWh. Normal water flow at Hellefossen is 300 cubic meters per second; during the flood of August 2023 it reached 1,800 cubic meters, a record for the waterfall.

J.C. Dahl depicted Hellefossen in an 1838 painting held by the National Gallery. The name probably means "the holy waterfall."
