= Prestfoss =

City in Norway

Coordinates: 60°02′N 9°38′E

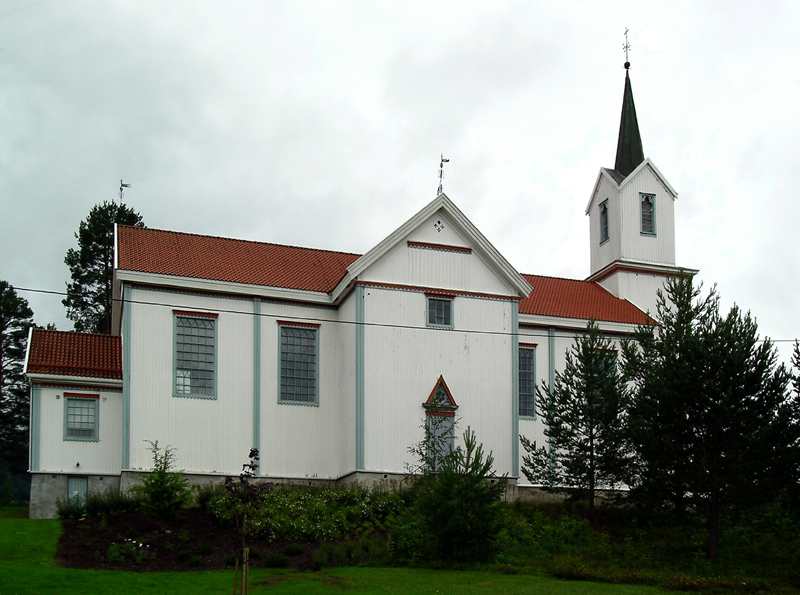
Holmen Church in Prestfoss

Prestfoss is the administrative center of Sigdal municipality in Buskerud, Norway. Highway Fv287 passes through Prestfoss. Both Fv132 and Fv133 start from here.

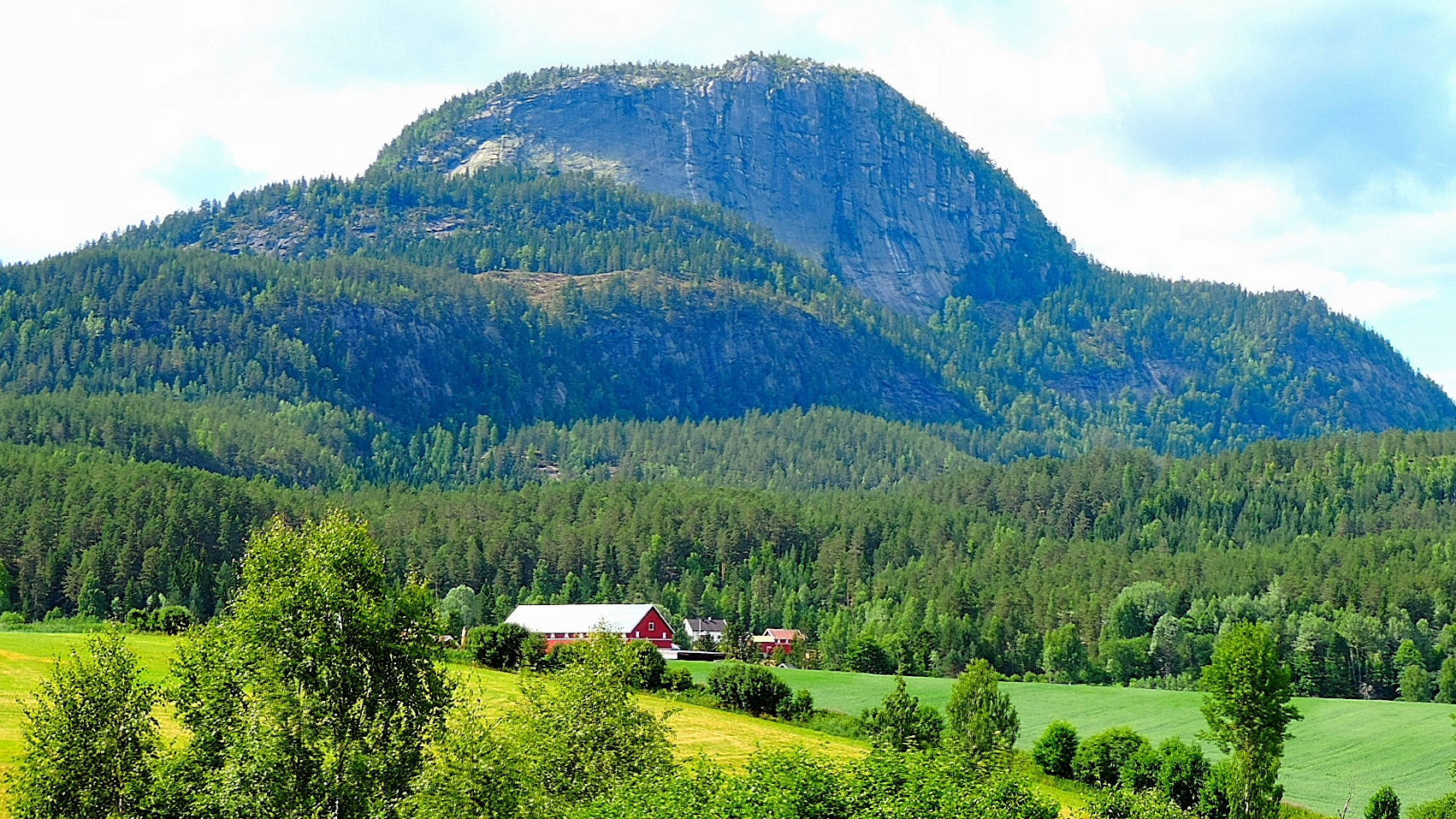
Andersnatten

== Summary ==
The population of Pressfoss as of 2005 was 465. Prestfoss is located 1.5 hours northwest of Oslo (100 km). Prestfoss is the location of Holmen Church (Holmen Kirke) a parish church which dates from 1853. Prestfoss is also the site of the Folk Music Center of Buskerud (Folkemusikksenteret i Buskerud), of Sigdal Museum and of Lauvlia, the former home of artist Theodor Kittelsen. These museums operate as part of the Buskerud Museum (Buskerudmuseet), a foundation for the preservation of cultural heritage within Buskerud.

== Local attractions ==
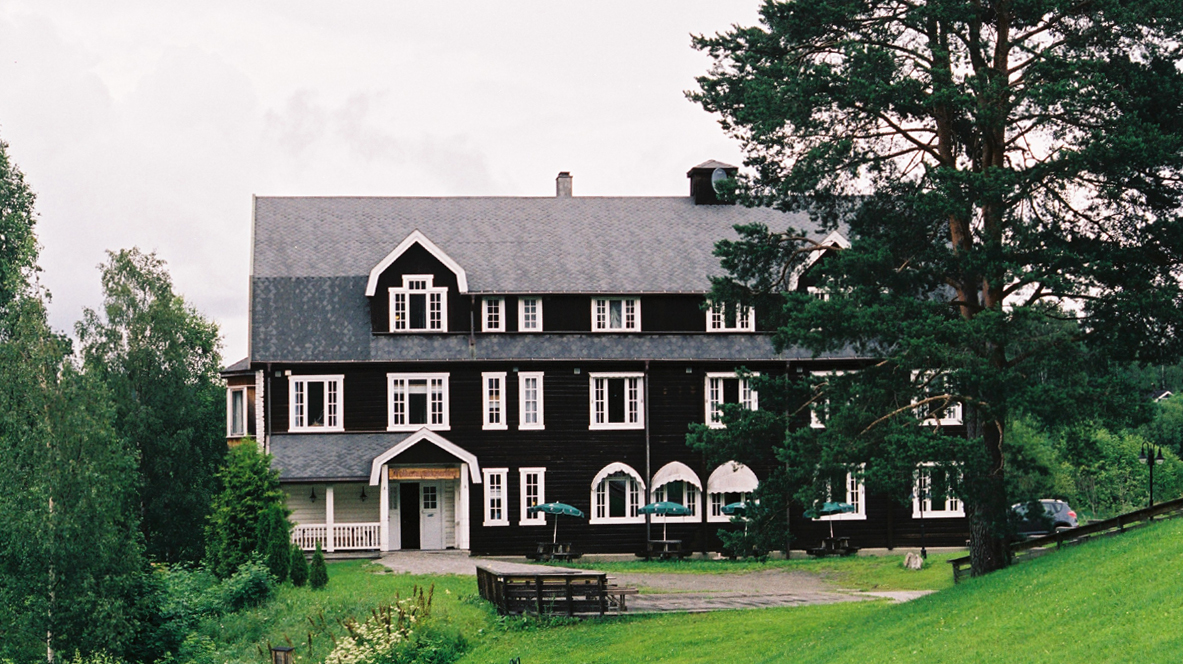
Folk Music Center of Buskerud

=== Folk Music Center of Buskerud ===
The Folk Music Center of Buskerud is an open-air cultural heritage museum offering a good image of the building style and traditions of the district. The Folk Music Center is principally responsible for collecting, storing and promoting local folk music and dance. The Archives of the Folk Music Center contains historical materials regarding local folk music.

=== Sigdal Museum ===
Sigdal Museum is a folkmuseum for the districts of Sigdal, Modum and Krødsherad. The museum comprises 13 buildings, mainly farmhouses, grouped together as examples of the rural life of the past. During the summer, visitors experience activities relating to traditional crafts and shows. A building, opened in 1978, houses a fine collection of regional costumes, from the 1800s to the present day. Sigdal Museum is situated on the grounds of the former Sigdal Nickel Works, which was in operation from 1874 until 1879.

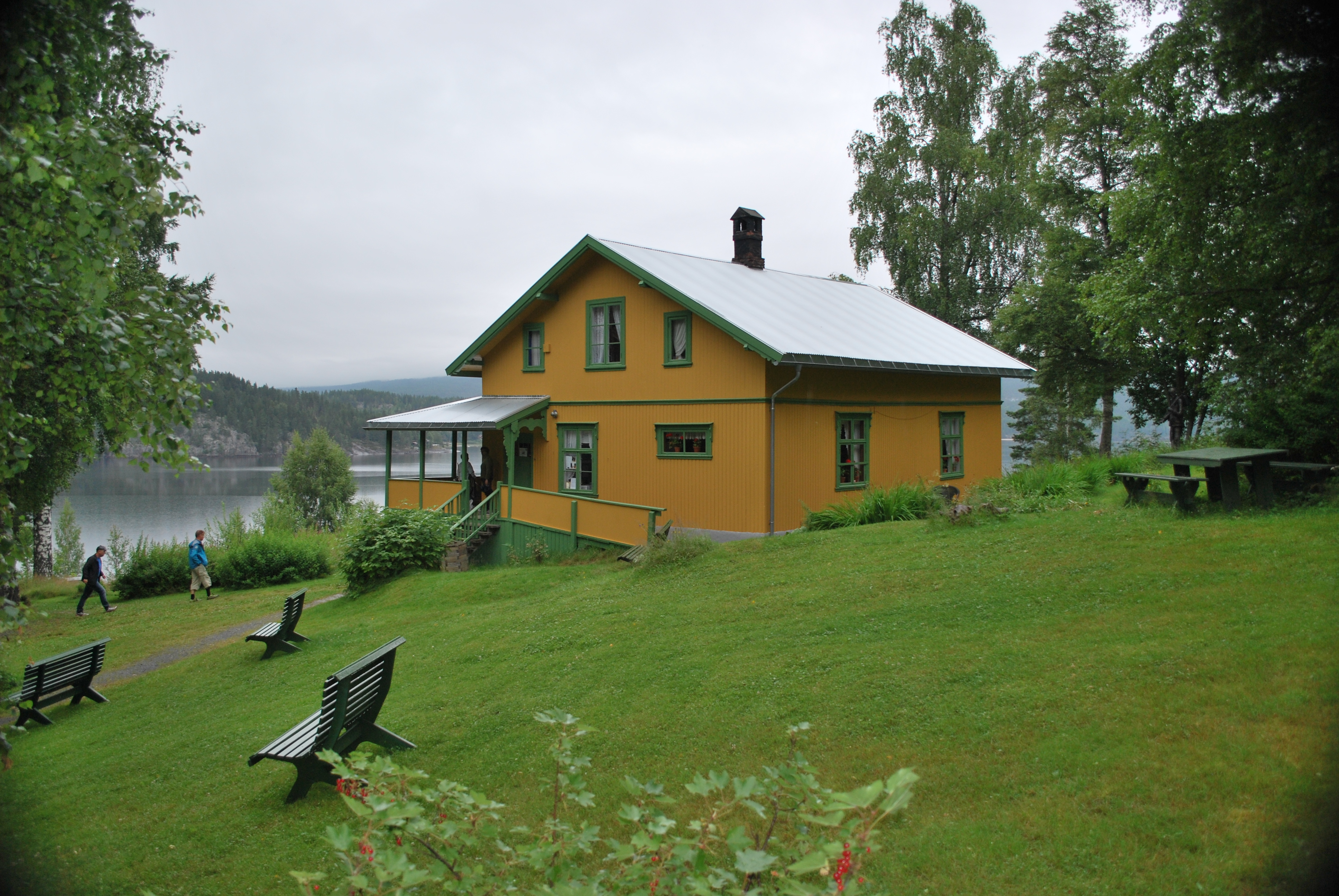
Lauvlia

=== Lauvlia ===
Norwegian artist Theodor Kittelsen settled near Prestfoss during 1899. Kittelsen was one of the most popular artists in Norway, mostly because of his fairy tale drawings and evocative paintings of people and trolls, animals and landscapes. Lauvlia, his former home, is located north of Prestfoss along Route Fv287. The surrounding area, with scenic view of Lake Soneren and Andersnatten which overlooks the lake, inspired some of Kittelsen's most famous landscapes.

Today Lauvlia is a private museum featuring an exhibition of Kittelsen's original work. Lauvlia is decorated with Kittelsen's own woodcarvings and murals. A new exhibition of original Kittelsen works is opened each year with painting and drawing activities arranged for children. The paintings exhibited are rotated each year.
