= Glitre Energi Produksjon =

Norwegian power company

Glitre Energi Produksjon AS
- Company type: Municipal owned
- Industry: Power
- Founded: 1997
- Headquarters: Drammen, Norway
- Area served: Buskerud
- Key people: Erik Andersen (CEO); Pål Jørgen Skjæggestad (Chairman)
- Products: Hydroelectricity
- Revenue: ▲NOK 648 million (2006)
- Operating income: NOK 449 million (2006)
- Net income: NOK 156 million (2006)
- Parent: Glitre Energi (100%)
- Website: www.glitreenergi.no

Glitre Energi Produksjon (formerly EB Kraftproduksjon AS) is a Norwegian power company that operates 31 hydroelectric power plants, primarily in Buskerud, with total average annual production of 2.3 TWh. The company is owned by Glitre Energi (100%).

== History ==
The company was established on 19 December 1997 under the name EB Kraftproduksjon AS and became part of Glitre Energi during corporate restructuring. In 2016, it was renamed Glitre Energi Produksjon.

On 31 May 2023, following the merger of Glitre Energi and Agder Energi, the company was dissolved and integrated into the new entity Å Energi Vannkraft.

== Operations ==
The company operated about 31 wholly or partially owned hydroelectric power plants, with an annual average production of 2.3–2.5 TWh.

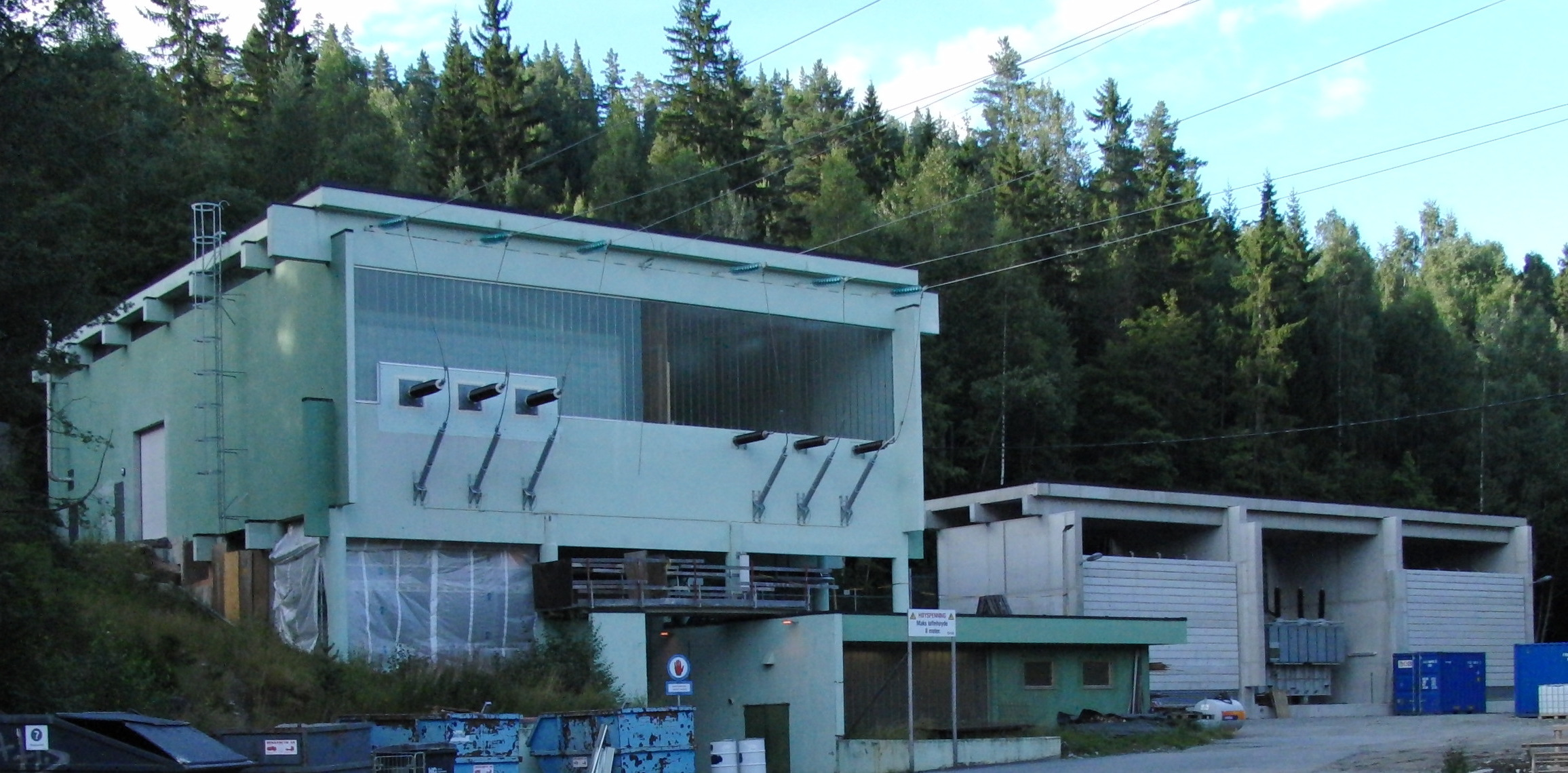
Mykstufoss Power Station in Rollag, one of the plants once operated by Glitre Energi Produksjon

These included:

- Wholly owned: Mykstufoss, Djupdal, Pikerfoss, Gamlebrofoss, Kaggefoss, Geithusfoss, Gravfoss I & II, Døvikfoss, Hensfoss, Hofsfoss, Begna, Svarttjern.
- Partially owned: Embretsfoss (50%), Skollenborg (69.2%), Ustekveikja (31%).

The company operated about 31 wholly or partially owned hydroelectric power plants, with an annual average production of 2.3–2.5 TWh. These included:

- Wholly owned: Mykstufoss, Djupdal, Pikerfoss, Gamlebrofoss, Kaggefoss, Geithusfoss, Gravfoss I & II, Døvikfoss, Hensfoss, Hofsfoss, Begna, Svarttjern.
- Partially owned: Embretsfoss (50%), Skollenborg (69.2%), Ustekveikja (31%).

=== Notable plants ===
- Mykstufoss Power Station, Rollag municipality – Run-of-river plant, 48 MW capacity, commissioned in the 1960s. Operated by Glitre Energi Produksjon until 2023, when it was transferred to Å Energi Vannkraft.
- Gravfoss II Power Station, Modum municipality – 30 MW capacity, in operation since 1996; transferred to Å Energi Vannkraft in 2023.

== Ownership ==
Glitre Energi Produksjon was a wholly owned subsidiary of Glitre Energi. The parent company was jointly owned by the City of Drammen and Buskerud County Municipality through Vardar AS.

== Financials ==
In 2006, the company reported revenues of NOK 648 million, operating income of NOK 449 million, and net income of NOK 156 million.

== Legacy ==
After the 2023 merger, the company’s hydropower plants became part of Å Energi’s portfolio. Å Energi today operates around 72 power stations with a total annual hydropower generation of 11.3 TWh, making it one of Norway’s largest renewable energy groups.

== See also ==
- Hydroelectricity in Norway
- Statkraft
- Agder Energi
- Å Energi
