= Haugfoss Træsliperi =

Norwegian wood pulp company

- Type: Industrial company
- Industry: Wood pulp
- Founded: 1894
- Defunct: 1926
- Fate: Destroyed by fire
- Headquarters: Modum, Buskerud, Norway
- Products: Wood pulp

Haugfoss Træsliperi was an industrial company that produced wood pulp at the Haugfossen waterfall in the Simoa river in Modum. The company was established in 1894 and closed in 1926.

== History ==
Haugfoss Træsliperi was built on the property of Modum Blåfarveverk at the Haugfossen waterfall in the Simoa. From the mid-19th century the heyday of Modum Blåfarveverk was over; operations recovered in the 1870s, but a new period of decline came in the 1890s. The director of the cobalt works, Benjamin Josef Gottschalk, did not want to give up the mining and wished to build up capital until new and better extraction methods could be introduced. The opportunity lay in the wood-processing industry, and there was good reason for the manager at Modum Blåfarveverk to invest in it, as the works owned both forest and waterfall, and there was a good supply of labor from the stagnating mining operation.

=== Establishment ===
The wood pulp industry had spread through the Drammen district in the 1880s. The new industry experienced a sharp downturn with a steep fall in pulp prices toward the end of the decade, but from 1892 the market improved, and Gottschalk proposed to his owners that they establish a mill to strengthen the cobalt works, or else the whole works would die out. The owners backed the director's plans, and in 1894 wood pulp production began at Haugfossen in the Simoa.

Production at the mill reached 4,000 tonnes in the first year, requiring 40 to 50 men. After five years of operation, in 1899, the factory was expanded with an American hot-grinding apparatus, and with this new grinding method production reached 7,000 tonnes a year; electric lighting was also installed in the factory. The German owners of the cobalt works ran the mill for 15 years. Modum municipality took over the old Blåfarveverk in 1919, with the two mills Haugfoss and Kongsfoss included in the deal. The municipal leadership's motives were directed not primarily at wood processing but at the possibilities for power development in the Simoa. The new company was named Modum kommunale Bruk, with Johannes Berggaard as its manager.

=== In municipal ownership ===
When the municipality took over Haugfoss Træsliperi in 1919, the company produced 5,500 tonnes of pulp on four grinding machines. Production at the factory had fallen over the previous ten years; the modernization of 1909 had raised output from 7,000 to 9,000 tonnes a year, but ten years after that expansion production had fallen by 3,500 tonnes, and the company produced only 1,500 tonnes more than it had at its start in 1894.

Pulp prices rose sharply after the First World War, reaching a peak in 1920, while timber prices rose as well. These rising raw-material prices were a problem for the industry when the downturn came in 1921. In addition, Norwegian currency policy (the par policy) was unfavorable to the wood-processing industry: it was official policy that the Norwegian krone should return to its prewar value against gold, so currency speculators, knowing the krone would rise, bought Norwegian kroner in large quantities and prices rose. Exports of paper and wood pulp suffered under these conditions. The timber contracts that had been entered into could not be reversed, and the companies had committed to timber prices calculated on much higher prices for the finished products. Modum kommunale Bruk, which ran both Haugfoss and Kongssagene mills, ran at a large deficit in 1921, close to 600,000 kroner.

Operations continued nonetheless, and Modum municipality invested further and modernized. At Haugfoss, the transport of pulp to Åmot station was made more efficient when two local hauliers each took it over with a truck, and new board machines were installed in 1924.

The two mills that became part of Modum kommunale Bruk in 1919 had much in common, one feature being their relationship to union organizing. The paternalistic ties to the management dampened organizing, but the wave of organizing that swept the Drammen district in 1906 strongly affected Modum municipality, and on 23 September 1906 a trade union was formed at Haugfoss. The union was in time attached to the Norwegian Paper Industry Workers' Union as branch number 50. Organizing weakened the bond to the factory manager as a fatherly figure of undisputed authority.

=== Crisis and fire ===
Five years passed after the crash of 1921 before the mill operation was given up. The population, and in time the municipal leadership too, wished to be rid of the Haugfoss and Kongssagene mills. An interested party from Porsgrunn, the engineer Engebret Rua (born 1875), made an approach in 1926. Rua was originally from Ringerike but moved about as manager of various wood-processing companies, and in 1926 he had led the factory in Bamble for four years. Before his involvement came to anything, the Haugfoss factory burned to the ground. For lack of capital, operations were never resumed, and after 5 December 1926 no wood pulp was produced at Haugfoss. At the other municipal mill, Kongssagene, operation continued.

== Bibliography ==
- Moen, Eli (1993). Modum – ei bygd med tre elver. Industrialiseringen av ei østlandsbygd 1870–1940. Modum, pp. 5, 27, 56–57, 167, 170–172, 251–252, 314–323.
- Sætherskar, Johs., ed. (1951). Det norske næringsliv. Buskerud Fylkesleksikon. Bergen.
