= Glitre Energi =

Power company based in Drammen, Norway

- Company type: Municipal owned
- Industry: Power
- Founded: 1999
- Headquarters: Drammen, Norway
- Area served: Buskerud
- Key people: Pål Skjæggestad (CEO); Johannes Rauboti (Chairman)
- Products: Electricity; Broadband
- Revenue: ▲NOK 1,212 million (2006)
- Operating income: NOK 522 million (2006)
- Net income: NOK 186 million (2006)
- Number of employees: 312 (2007)
- Parent: City of Drammen (50%); Buskerud County Municipality (50%)
- Website: eb.no

Glitre Energi (formerly Energiselskapet Buskerud, EB) is a power company based in Drammen, Norway. The company operates electricity retailing, operates the power grid in Drammen, Nedre Eiker and Kongsberg and provides services within broadband. Glitre Energi serves approximately 90,000 customers, supplying electricity to customers in the Norwegian regions of Buskerud and Hadeland. The company is responsible for the power lines in Buskerud, which make up a large distribution network across densely populated areas. Glitre Energy is owned by the City of Drammen (50%) and Buskerud County Municipality (50%). Power production has been spun off in the partially owned subsidiary EB Kraftproduksjon, where EB owns 70% and E-CO Energi owns 30%.

== History ==
The first power plant operated by the company, Granfoss power plant, was established in 1903. In 1991 Drammen Energiverk is transformed to the limited company Drammen Kraft. In 1997 it established Drammen Kraft Produksjon in cooperation with Oslo Energi. In 1999 Drammen Kraft and the county owned Buskerud Energi were merged to create EB. In 2003 it bought ten power plants form Norske Skog.
