= Simoa =

Coordinates: 59°57′05″N 9°48′20″E

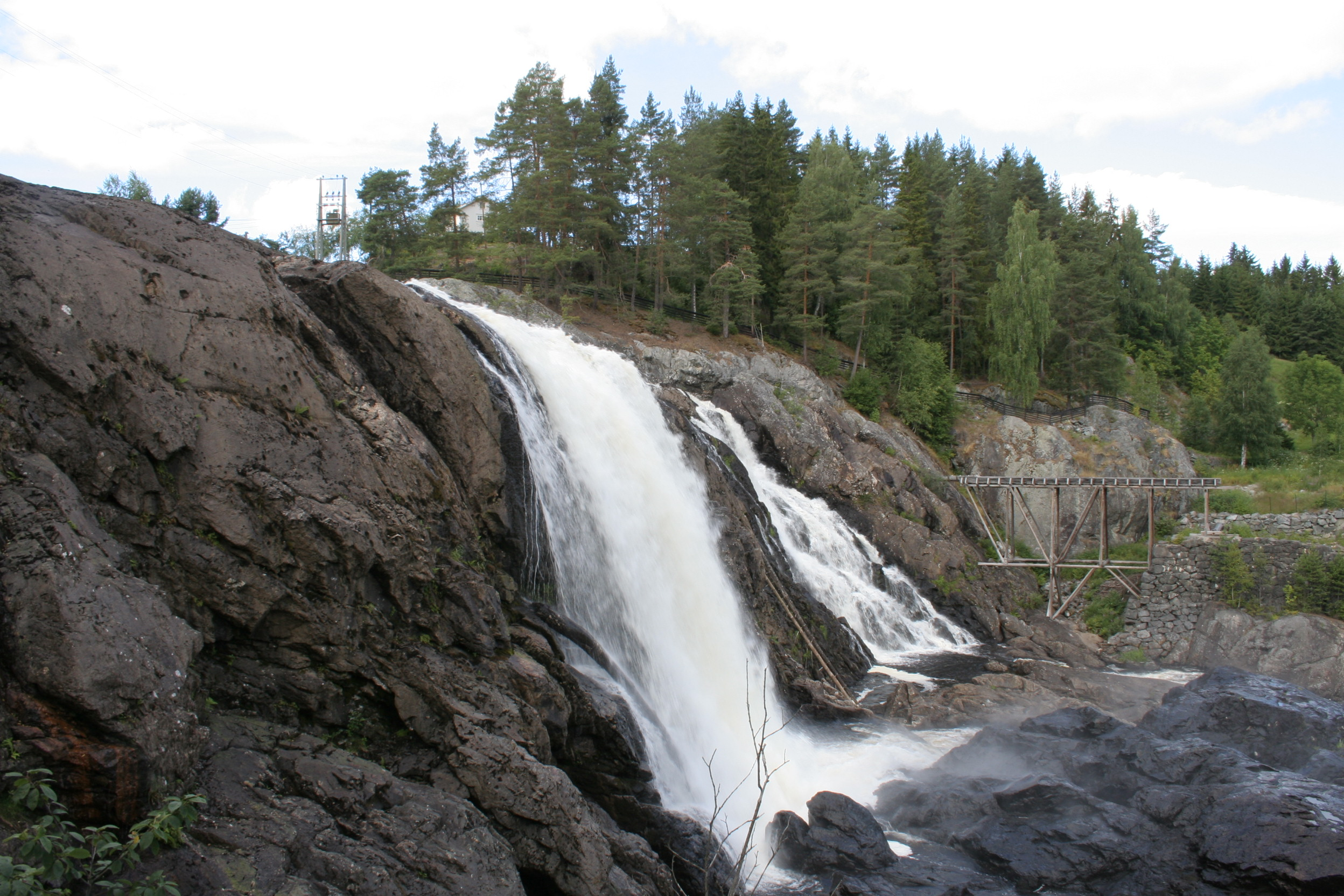
- Haugfoss on the Simoa

Physical characteristics
- Source
  - location: Solevatn (Capellen map) or Soneren lake (Store norske leksikon)
- Mouth
  - location: Drammenselva at Åmot, Buskerud
- Basin size: 889 km^{2} (343 sq mi)

Simoa is the name of a river which flows through the municipalities of Sigdal and Modum in Buskerud County, Norway.

== Location ==
The Simoa river runs from Lake Soneren through the municipality of Sigdal in a south-easterly course until it flows into Drammenselva at Åmot in Modum. The river begins a few miles north of Lake Haglebuvatna where it is initially known as the Haglebu, later becoming the Eggedøla as it flows through the valley of Eggedal. Lake Soneren lies at an elevation of 103 metres (338 ft). The drainage basin of the Simoa covers 889 square kilometres (343 mi^{2}).

Haugfoss waterfall at Blaafarveværket in Modum, has been used as a motif for many artists throughout history. Notable examples include Winter at Simoa River which was painted during 1883 by Norwegian artist Frits Thaulow.

It was developed for hydroelectric power by Midt Nett Buskerud AS, the utility company owned by Modum and Sigdal municipalities. Haugfoss kraftverk was constructed in 1937 and has a capacity of 3.6 MW. Horga, the tributary river which runs into Soneren has Horga kraftverk, a second power station which was built 1988–1990 and has a capacity of 7.2 MW.

Among the floods in the Simoa which have caused damage, are those in 1752, 1858, 1934, 1938, 1987, 1995, 2007, and 2008. Attempts are made to regulate the reservoirs to reduce the risk of flooding. Parts of Simoa was protected in the Conservation Plan for the river (1973). The river is protected upstream from Lake Soneren.

The former name for the river was Sigm(á), sigm meaning "glide" and å meaning "river".

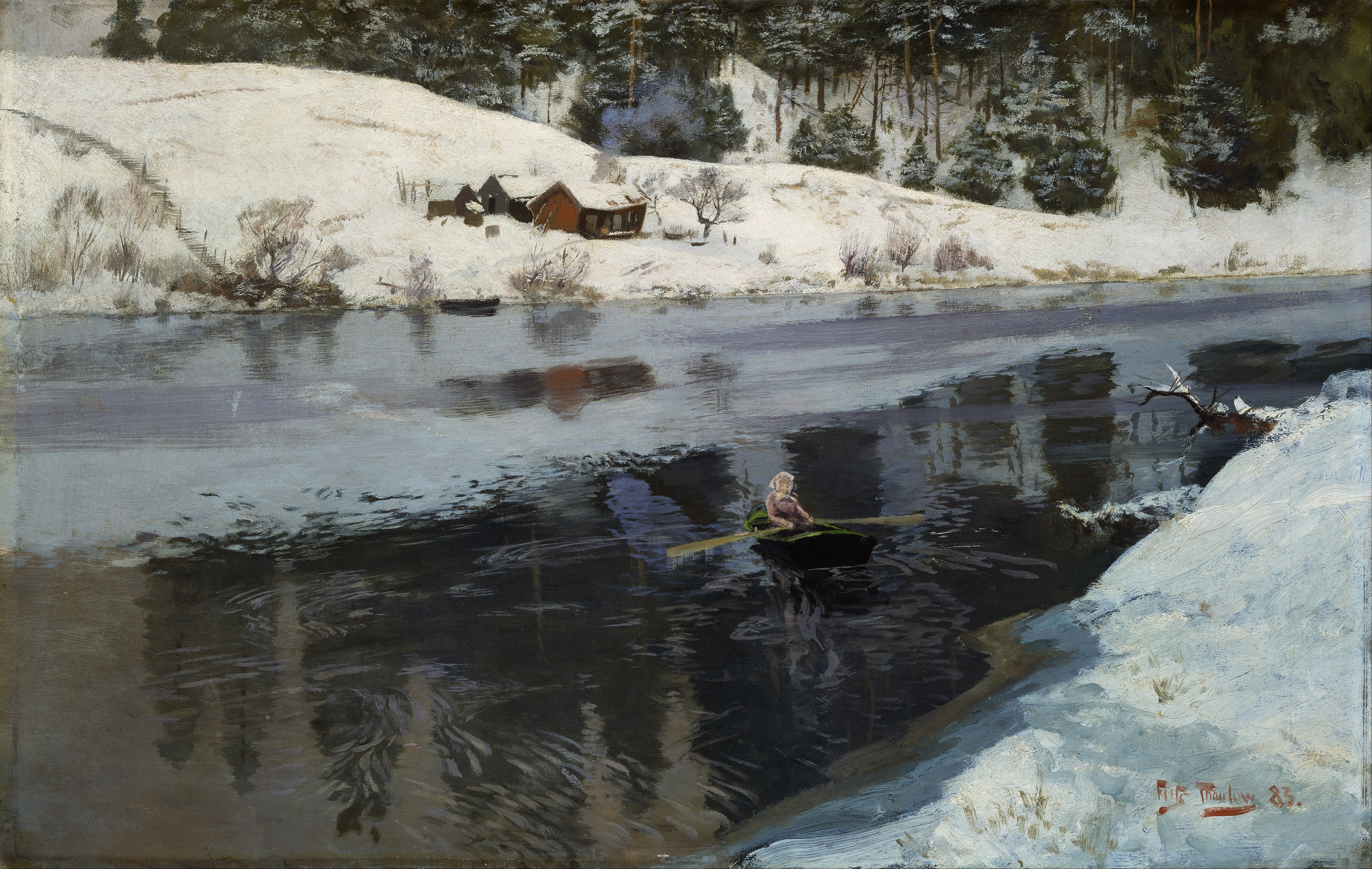
Winter at Simoa River Frits Thaulow (1886) National Gallery, Oslo, Norway

== Other sources ==
- "Simoa", Store norske leksikon (in Norwegian)
