= Drammenselva =

River in Norway

Coordinates: 59°44′N 10°14′E

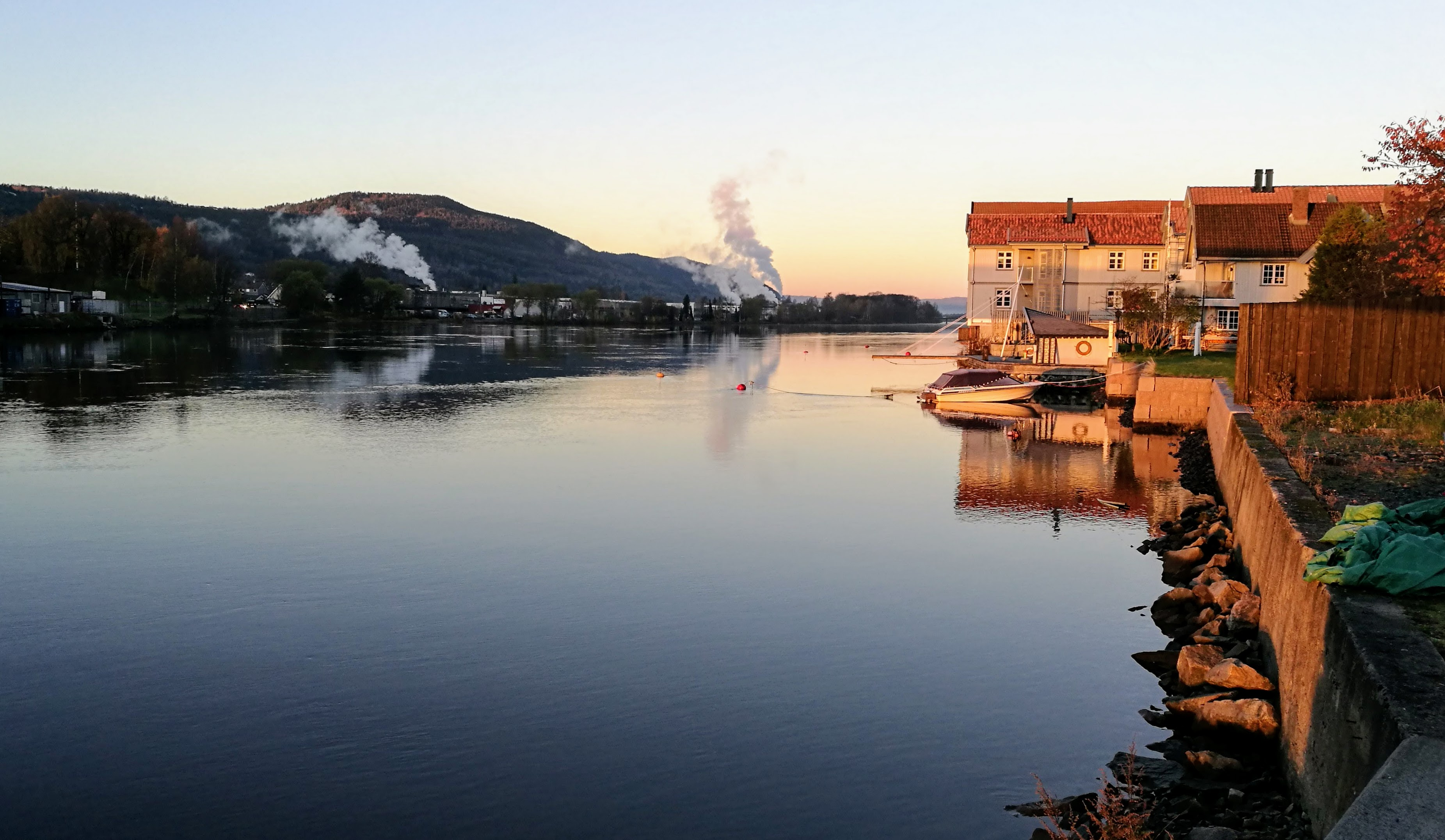
The Drammenselva seen from central Drammen (Øvre Sund). Eastwards view. Foto: Stian Martinsen

The Drammenselva (English: Drammen River) is a river in Buskerud county, southeastern Norway.

== Location ==
The Drammenselva is one of the largest rivers in Norway, with a drainage basin of about 17,000 square kilometres (6,600 mi^{2}) and a discharge of 300 cubic metres per second (11,000 cu ft/s) per second. Drammen River's total length is 308 kilometres (191 mi), making it the fifth longest river in Norway.

Its 48 km course runs from Tyrifjorden in the north to Drammensfjord in the south, where it cuts through the centre of the city of Drammen. The Drammen River gathers inflow from several streams and rivers. The largest include the Simoa River. The whole drainage system which includes the Drammenselva as the lowest part is known as Drammensvassdraget and is located in the counties of Innlandet and Buskerud.

== Development and usage ==
For centuries the river was used for log driving, transporting timber from the forests in Eiker to the many paper mills and other industry along the river. From the 1850s onwards, many steam-powered sawmills and planing mills were established along the lower section of the river, and products became exports moving through the Port of Drammen. During the 20th century this activity caused the river to be heavily polluted. However, the majority of the paper and pulp factories in Drammen shut down in the 1960s and 1970s, and the river is now clean and safe.

On its way to the sea, Drammen River passes a series of rapids and waterfalls. The largest are Vikerfoss, Geithusfoss, Kattfoss, Gravfoss, Embretsfoss, Døvikfoss and Hellefoss. There are a number of power plants on the Drammen River, several with dams. The owner and operator is EB Kraftproduksjon which is headquartered in Drammen. The power company is owned by Buskerud Energy Power Generation (Energiselskapet Buskerud AS).

- Hellefoss has a hydroelectric dam in Hokksund in Øvre Eiker Municipality
- Døvikfoss and Embretsfoss have hydroelectric dams in Åmot in Modum Municipality
- Gravfoss and Geithusfoss have hydroelectric power station in Geithus in Modum Municipality

Since then the city of Drammen has spent substantial resources on developing attractive park areas along the riverside. The area between the City and the Holmen bridges in Drammen has also been developed into parkland, and is now known as Bragernes Riverside Park. Hundreds of trees and thousands of perennials have been planted here in order to create a pleasant leisure area. Today the Drammenselva is used for recreational purposes, and is known for its excellent salmon fishing. It is the site of the annual Drammen River Festival (Drammen Elvefestival). The festival features music concerts, dragon boats, raft racing and bathtub rowing. More than 100 different events take place during the River Festival.

== Gallery ==
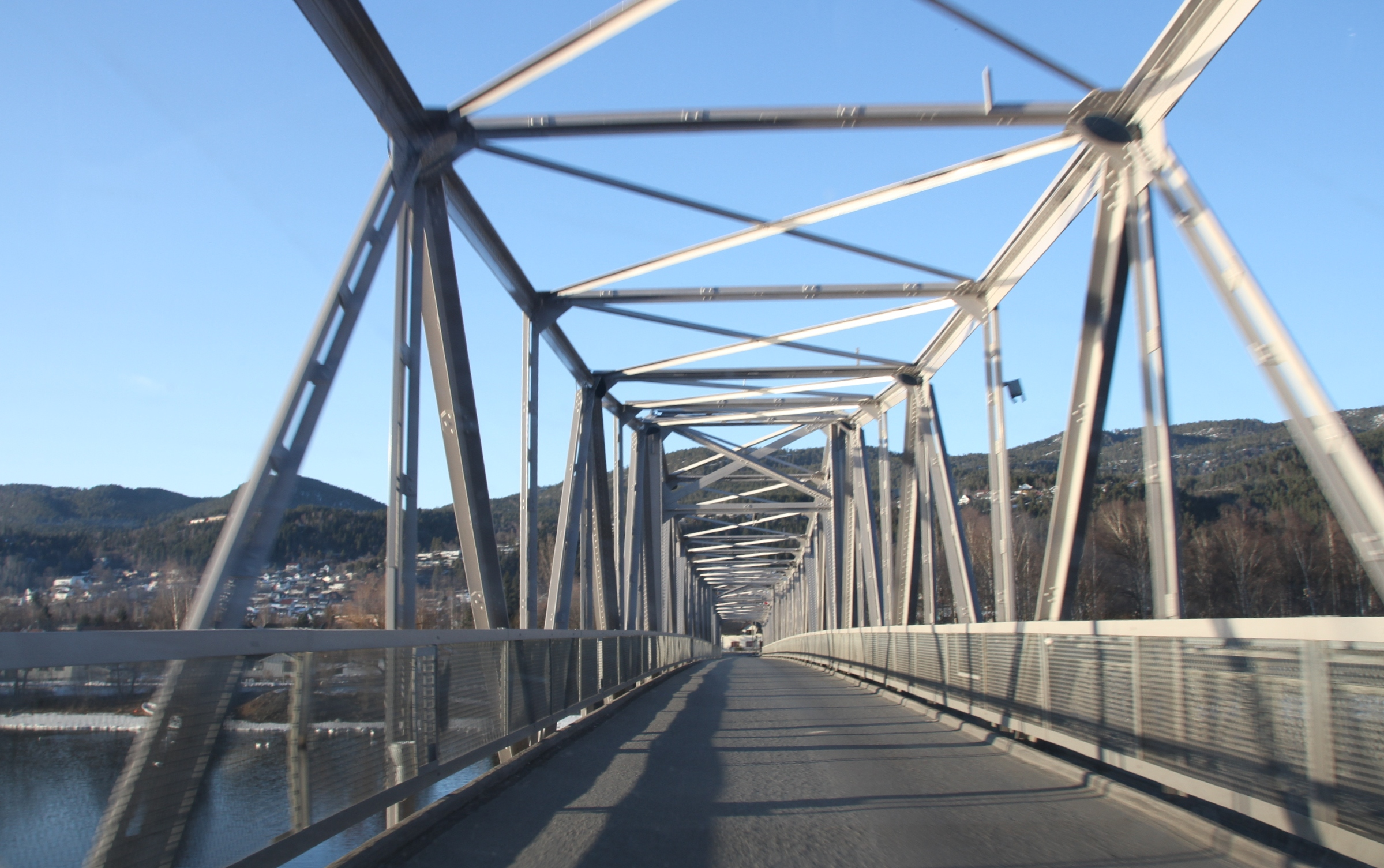
Mjöndalen bridge on the Drammenselva

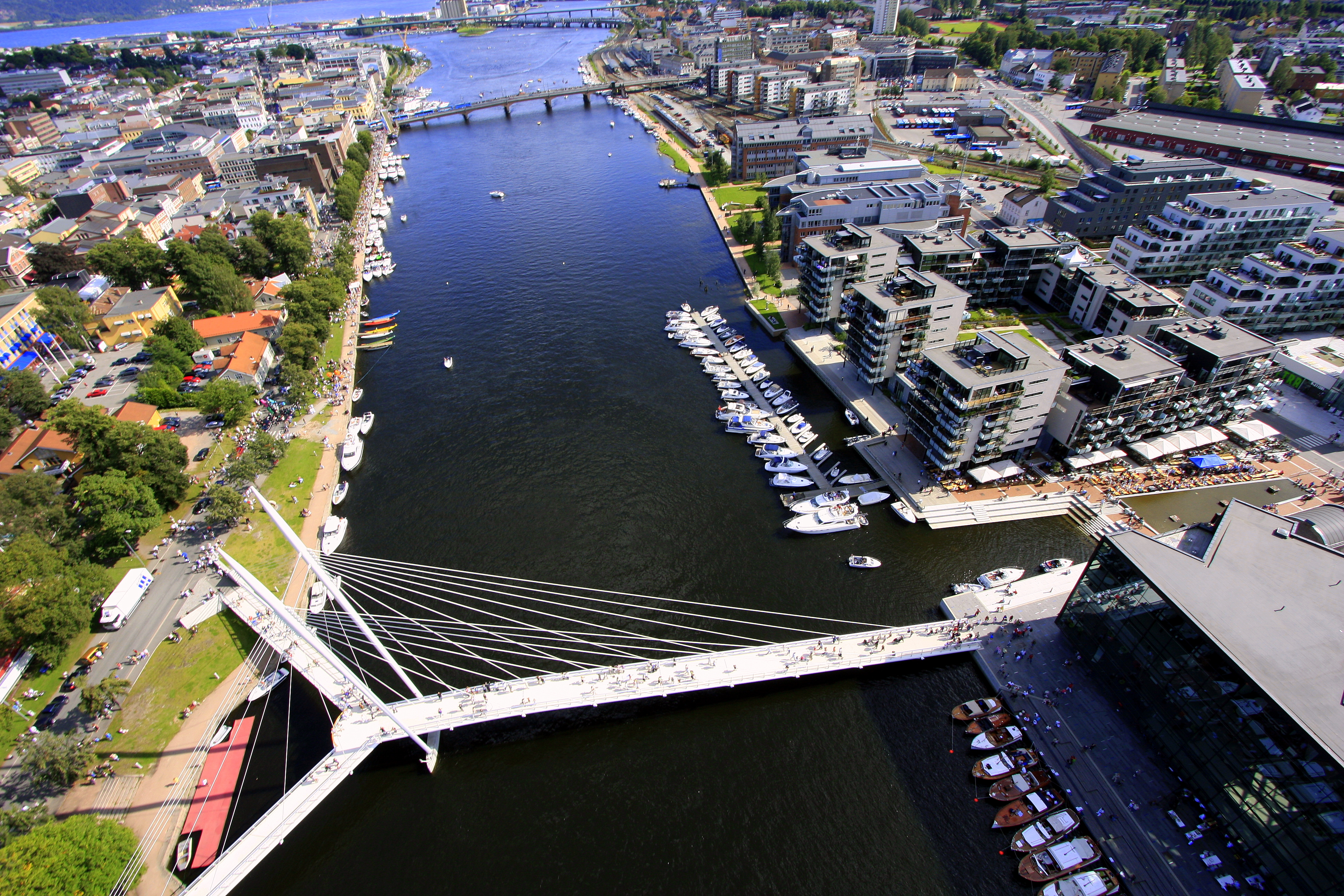
Ypsilon bridge betsween Strømsø and Bragernes

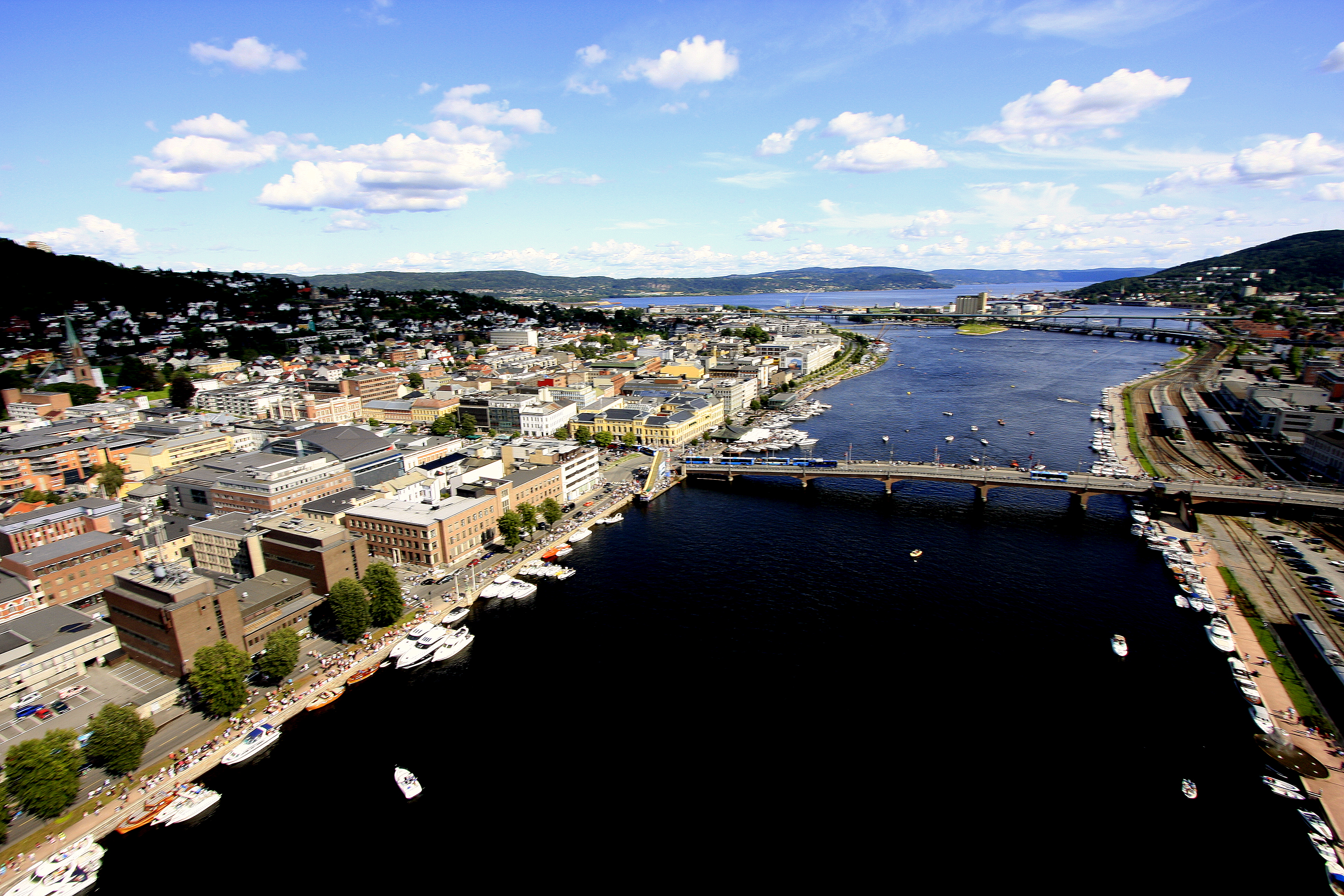
Bragernes area

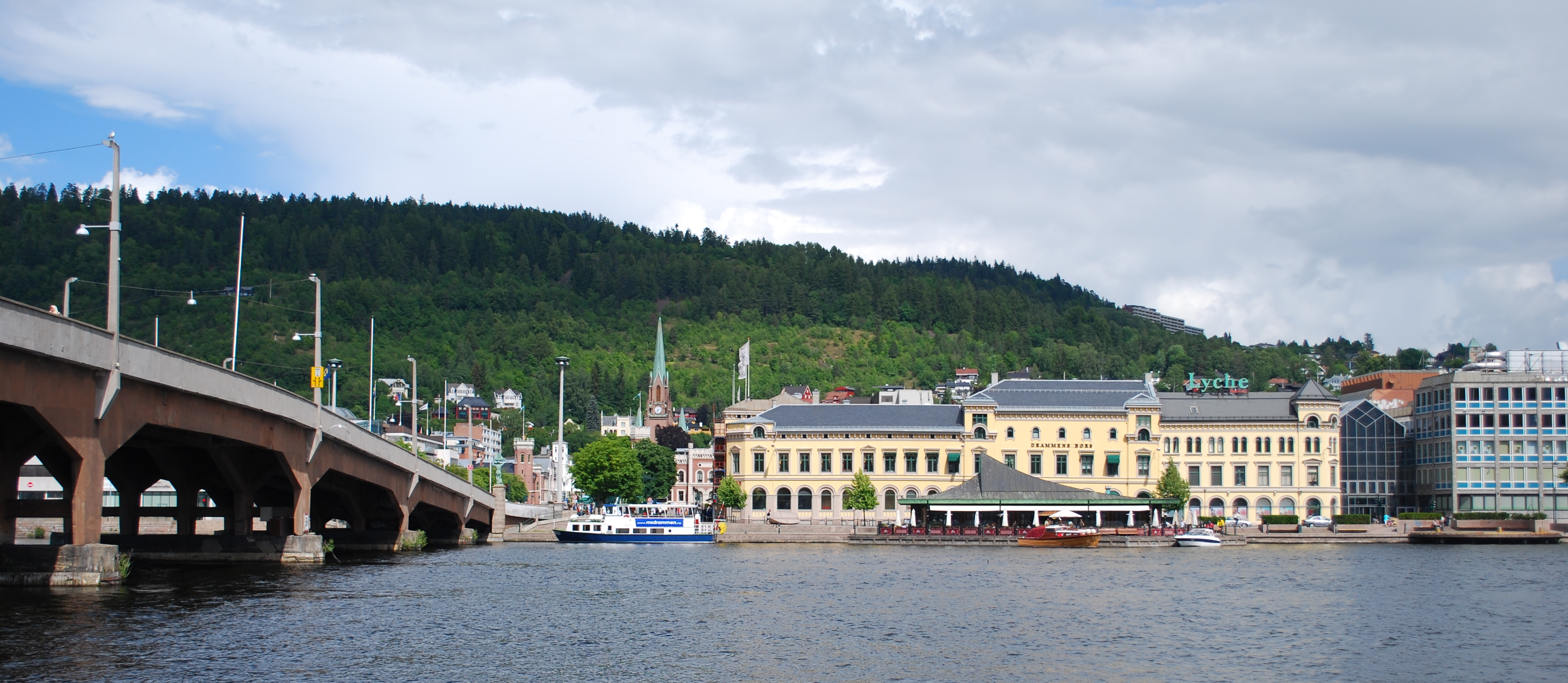
Bybrua bridge and Bragernes ship pier

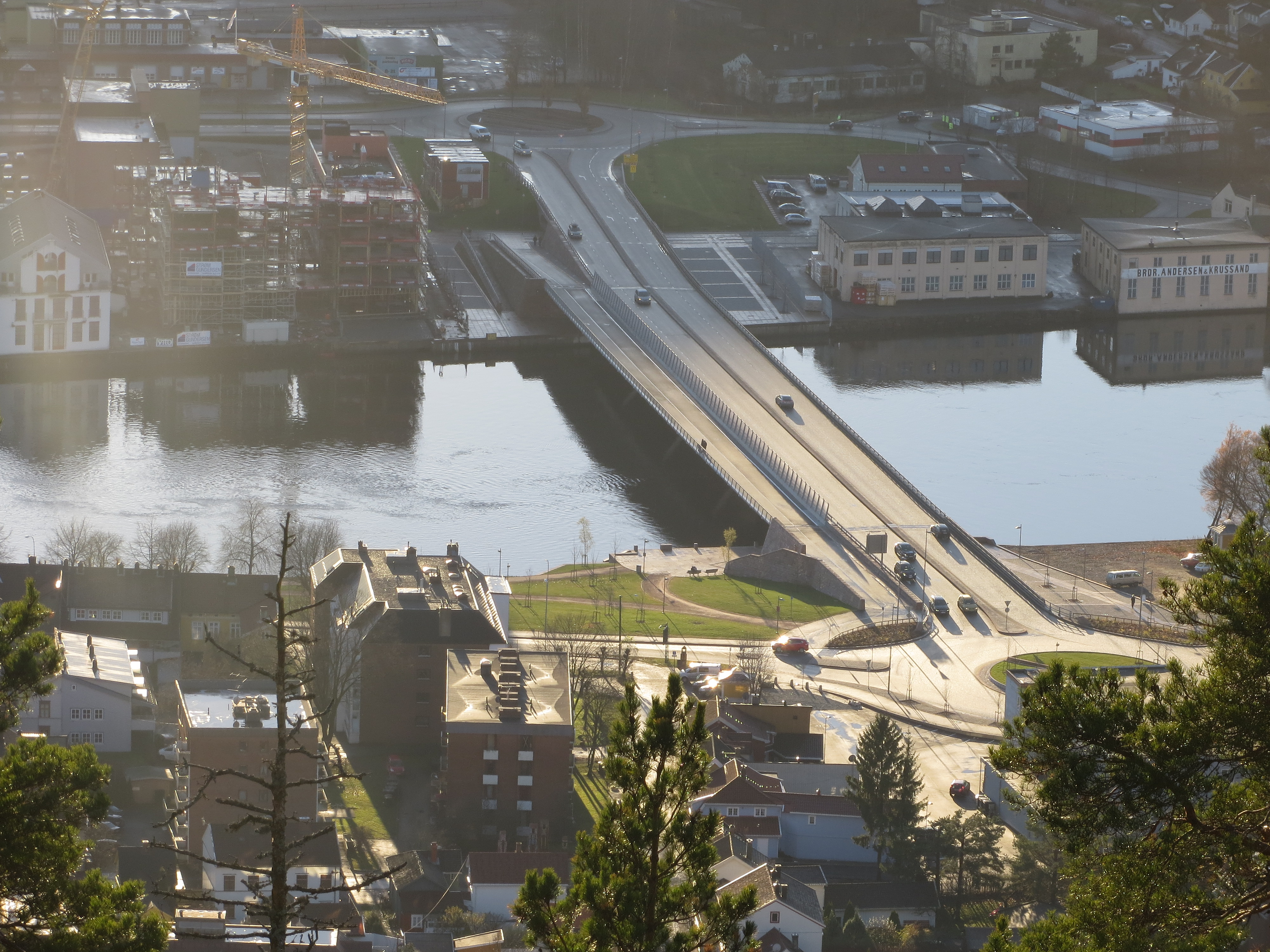
Øvre Sund bridge in Drammen

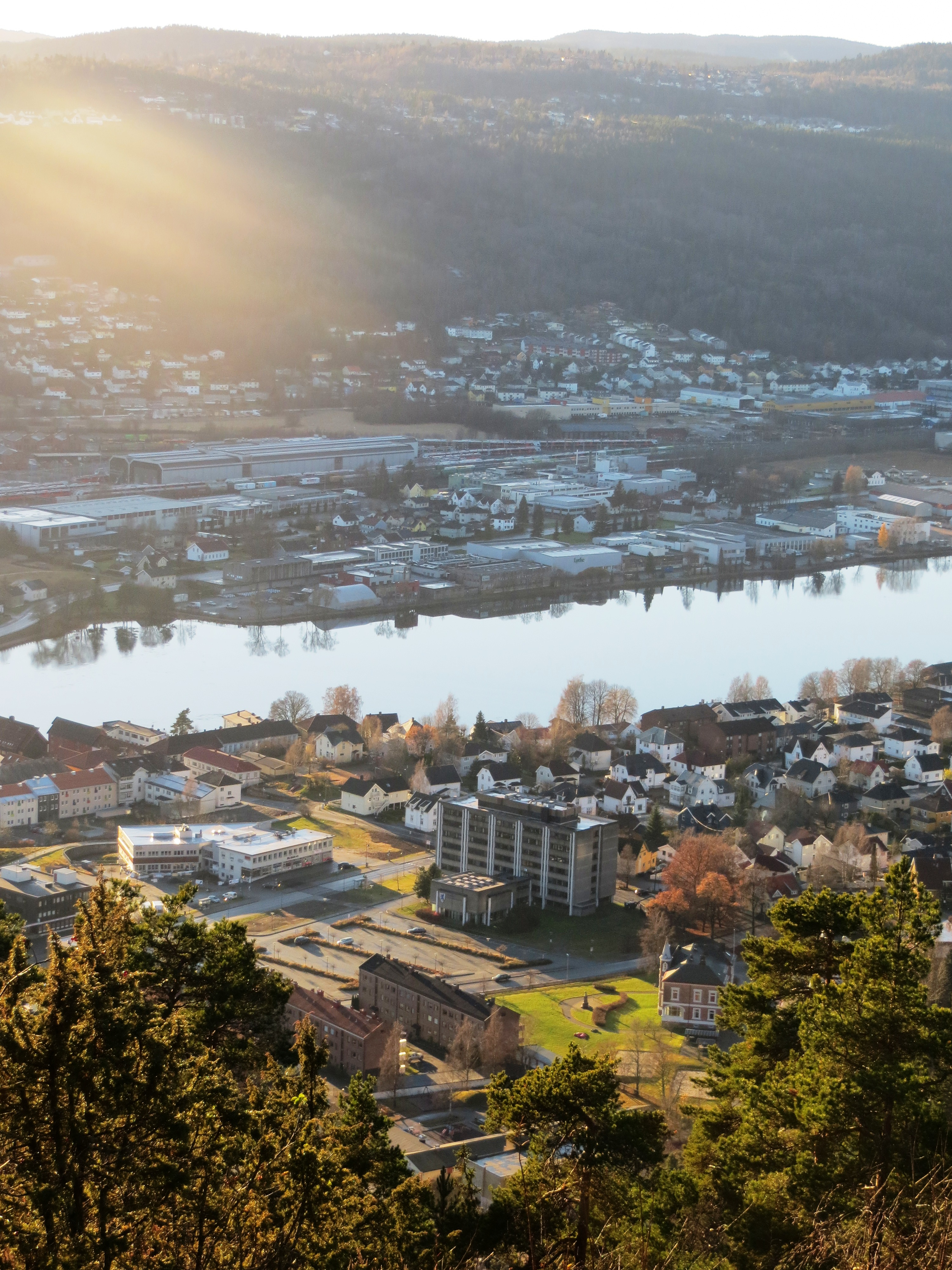
Bragernes along the Drammenselva

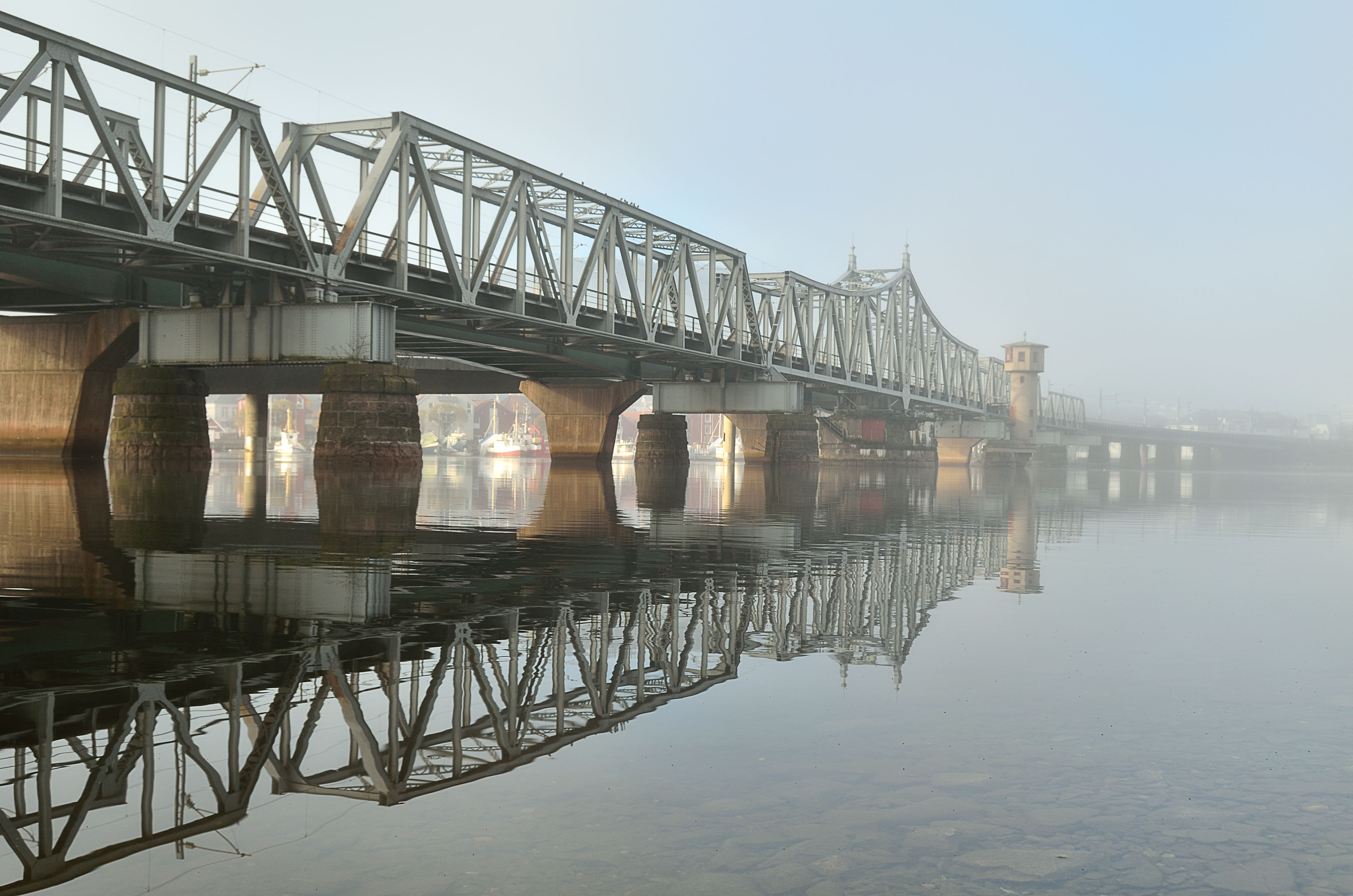
Jernbanebroa bridge in Drammen

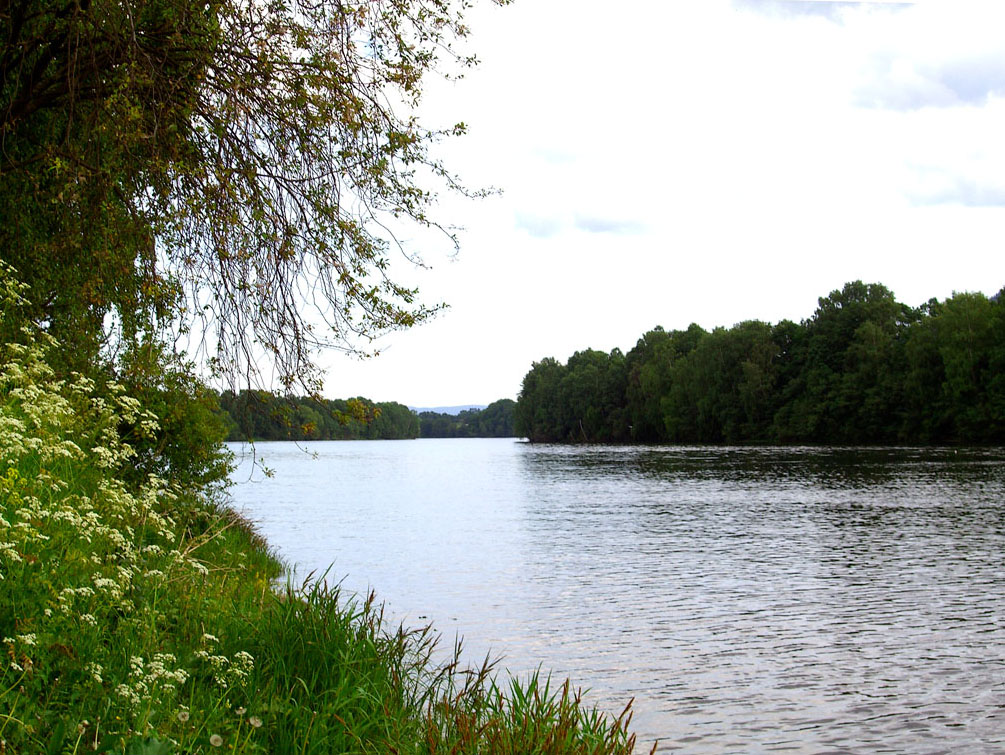
The Drammenselva upstream from Solbergelva.
