= Hoen =

Hoen is a surname of Dutch or Norwegian origin. A variant form in Dutch is "'t Hoen" ("the hen"). People with this surname include:

- August Hoen (1817–1886), American lithographer
- Borger Kristoffersson Hoen (1799–1877), Norwegian politician
- Christopher Borgersen Hoen (1767–1845), Norwegian farmer and politician
- Cornelis Hoen (c.1440–1524), Dutch theologian
- Guno Hoen (1922–2010), Surinamese footballer, commentator and author
- Herman Hoen (1340–1404), first lord of Hoensbroek, son of Nicolaes
- Nicolaes Hoen (died 1371), Limburgian founder of the Van Hoensbroeck family
- Paul Hoen (born 1961), American director and producer
- Ragnar Hoen (1940–2019), Norwegian chess player
- Steinar Hoen (born 1971), Norwegian high jumper

't Hoen

- Ellen 't Hoen (born 1960), Dutch health researcher and humanitarian
- Evert-Jan 't Hoen (born 1975), Dutch baseball player
- Pieter 't Hoen (1744–1828), Dutch Patriot journalist

Van Hoen

- Mark Van Hoen (born 1966), English musician

== See also ==
- Mechelse Hoen, Dutch name for the Malines chicken breed
