= Hokksund =

City in Øvre Eiker, Norway

Coordinates: 59°47′N 9°59′E

- Town
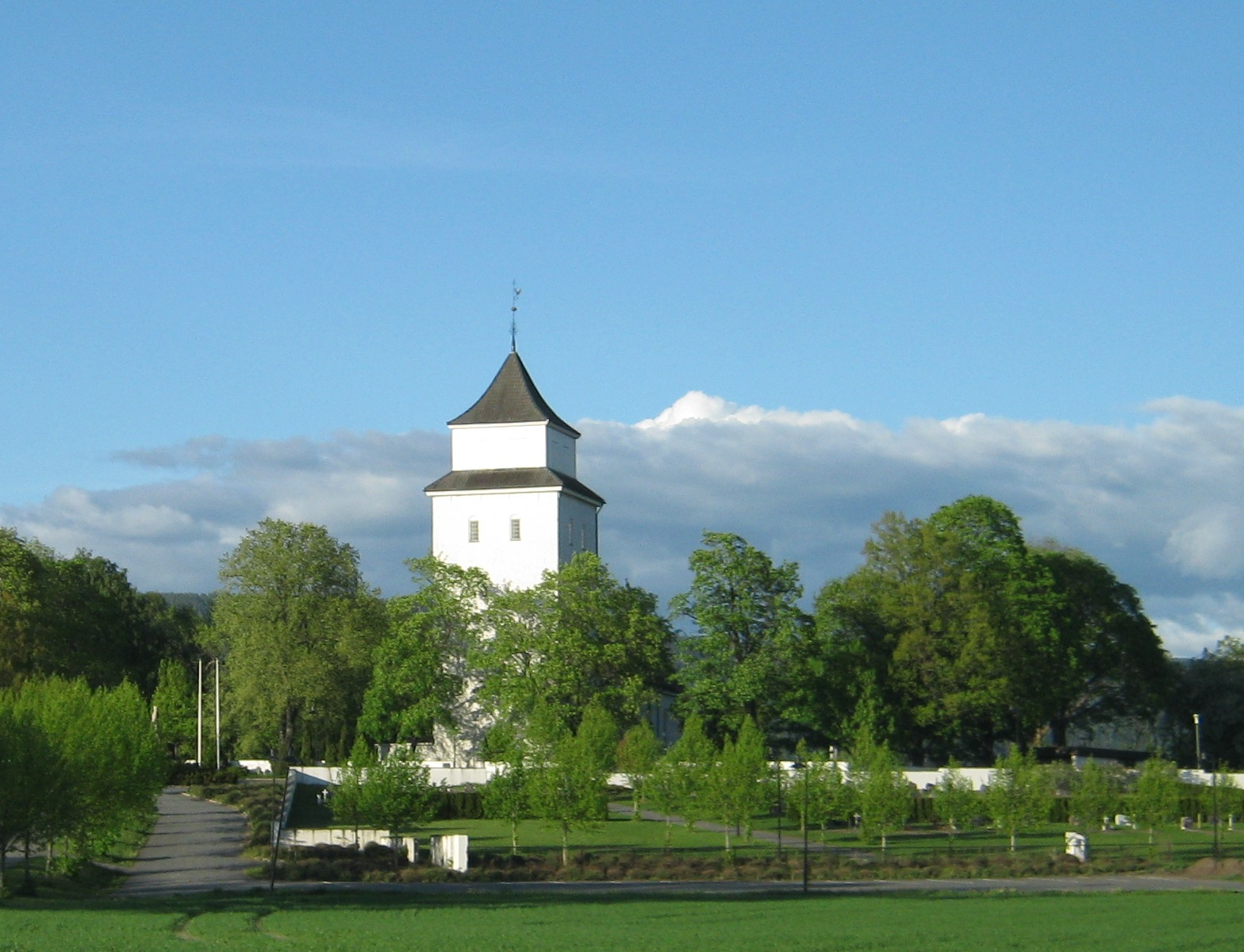
- Haug Church in Hokksund
- Interactive map of Hokksund
- Country: Norway
- Regions: Østlandet
- County: Buskerud
- Municipality: Øvre Eiker

Area
  - Total: 8.6 km^{2} (3.3 sq mi)

Population (2017)
  - Total: 8,318
  - Density: 970/km^{2} (2,500/sq mi)

Hokksund is a town in the county of Buskerud in Eastern Norway. It is the largest population center and administrative center of the municipality of Øvre Eiker.

The town is located upstream of the Drammenselva river, about 18 km (11 mi) west of the city of Drammen and 49 km (30 mi) from the Norwegian capital of Oslo. The Vestfosselva river splits into two near Hokksund before meeting with Drammenselva near the center of the town. The Hellefoss hydro-electric station is located north of the town.

== Etymology ==
The combination of two words–"Haug" from the name of a farm located here, and "sund" meaning "ferry place" became Haugsund, which later became Hokksund.

== History ==
The first national road known as the King's road was built between Hokksund and Kongsberg in 1624. Nøstetangen glassworks factory was established in the late 18th century in the town. In 1834, the Hoen treasure, the country's largest gold find from the Viking era, was discovered at the Nedre Hoen farm in Hokksund. Weighing more than 2.5 kg (5.5 lb), the gold jewellery and artifacts are on display at the Museum of Cultural History, Oslo.

== Geography ==
Hokksund is located in the county of Buskerud in Eastern Norway. It is the administrative center of the municipality of Øvre Eiker. It is located about 18 km (11 mi) west of the city of Drammen and 49 km (30 mi) from the Norwegian capital of Oslo. Located at an altitude of 13 m (43 ft), the town roughly covers an area of 8.6 km^{2} (3.3 sq mi). The Vestfosselva river splits into two near Hokksund before meeting with the larger Drammenselva river near the center of the town. The Drammenselva proceeds towards Drammen, where it flows into the fjord of Drammensfjorden. The Hellefoss hydro-electric station is located north of the town. The old settlements are located northeast of the Drammenselva river, while the newer settlements is location on the other side of the river.

=== Climate ===
Hokksund has a warm-summer humid continental climate, characterized by cold winters and mild summers. It is often one of the warmest places in the country during the summer, due to its somewhat inland and low-lying location in a valley with generally little wind. In September 2016, the Hokksund weather station experienced 23 days with temperatures reaching above 20°C, setting a new national record for the month.

Climate data for Hokksund 1991–2020 (15 m, avg high/low 2013–2025)
Month	Jan	Feb	Mar	Apr	May	Jun	Jul	Aug	Sep	Oct	Nov	Dec	Year
Mean daily maximum °C (°F)	−1 (30)	2.1 (35.8)	6.9 (44.4)	12.8 (55.0)	18.1 (64.6)	22.6 (72.7)	24.3 (75.7)	22.4 (72.3)	18.3 (64.9)	11.2 (52.2)	4.6 (40.3)	0.8 (33.4)	11.9 (53.4)
Daily mean °C (°F)	−4.1 (24.6)	−3 (27)	0.9 (33.6)	6 (43)	11.2 (52.2)	15.2 (59.4)	17.5 (63.5)	16.1 (61.0)	11.8 (53.2)	5.5 (41.9)	1 (34)	−3.6 (25.5)	6.2 (43.2)
Mean daily minimum °C (°F)	−8.4 (16.9)	−6.1 (21.0)	−3.5 (25.7)	0.4 (32.7)	5.4 (41.7)	10.1 (50.2)	11.9 (53.4)	10.4 (50.7)	7.9 (46.2)	2.9 (37.2)	−1.3 (29.7)	−5.7 (21.7)	2.0 (35.6)
Average precipitation mm (inches)	40 (1.6)	24 (0.9)	25 (1.0)	39 (1.5)	59 (2.3)	78 (3.1)	83 (3.3)	81 (3.2)	70 (2.8)	91 (3.6)	68 (2.7)	49 (1.9)	707 (27.9)
Source 1: yr.no (mean, precipitaiton)
Source 2: Seklima.no (avg. high/low)

== Economy ==
The town is located close to fertile agricultural lands. The local economy is based on forestry, and other engineering industries such as electrical and cement. Tourism also plays a vital role, with several hotels and a campsite located in the town.

== Transportation ==
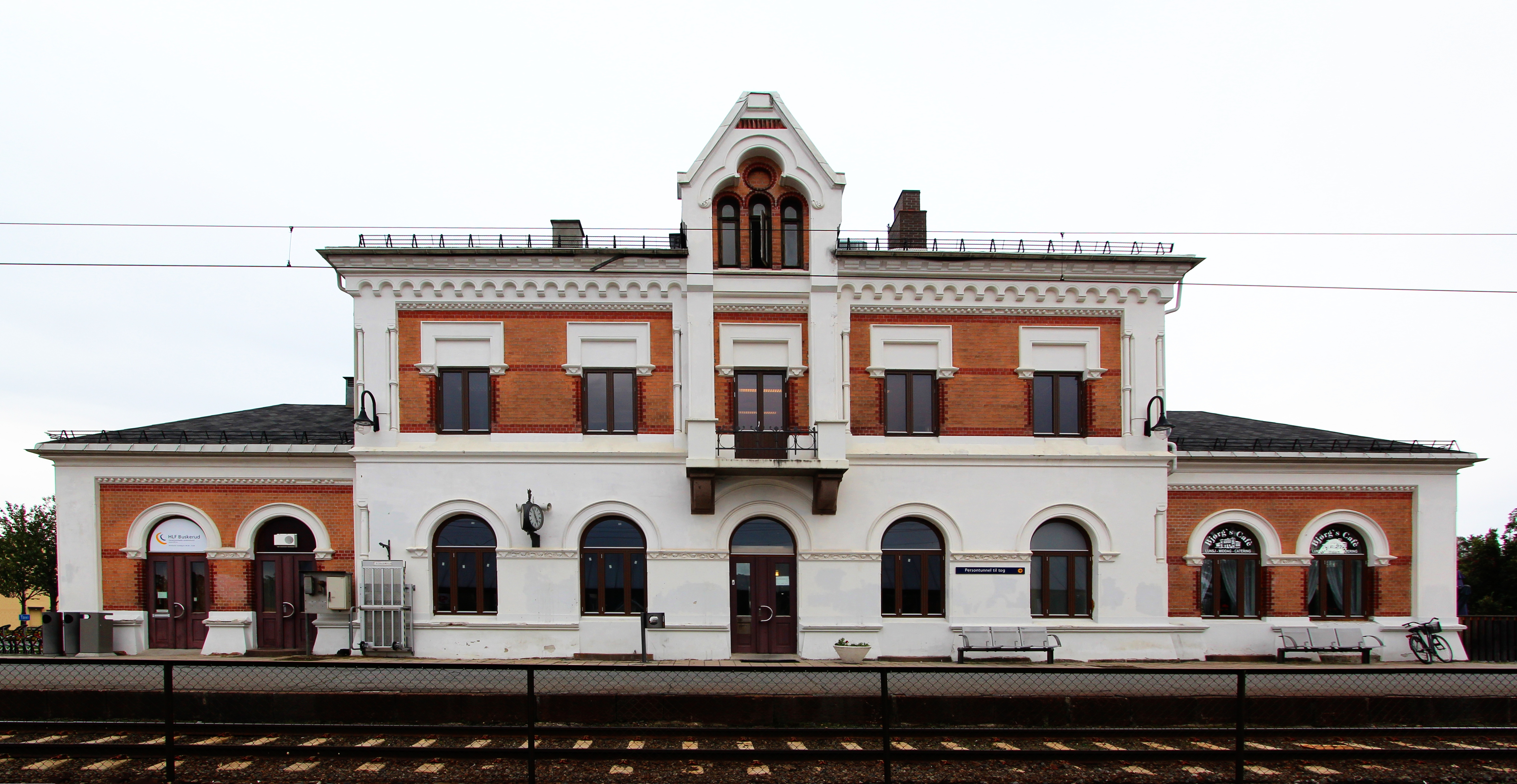
Hokksund Station

The European route E134 from Frogn Municipality to Karmøy Municipality runs south of the town. The National road 350 connects the E134 with Hønefoss via Hokksund.

Hokksund Station (Hokksund stasjon) is located on the Sørlandet Line. The station was opened in 1866 as part of Randsfjorden Line between Drammen and Vikersund. The existing station building was built in 1897 and is constructed in Renaissance style designed by Paul Due. The railway line is part of the Drammen–Kristiansand–Stavanger route, which is connected to Oslo. Go-Ahead Norge operates long-haul passenger services on the line. The station is also part of the R12 route of the Oslo Commuter Rail between Kongsberg and Eidsvoll.

The nearest major airports are Oslo Airport, Gardermoen and Sandefjord Airport, Torp. Hokksund has an operating airfield.

== Places of interest ==
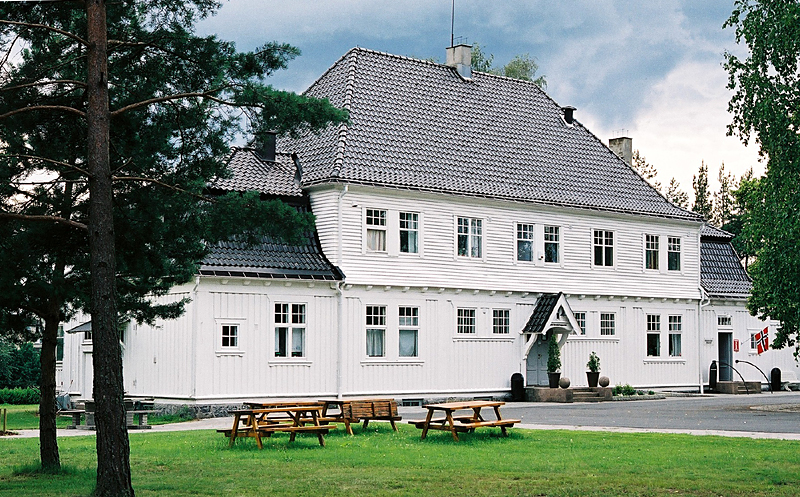
Nøstetangen Museum

The Haug church was built in 1152 by Cardinal Nicolaus Brekespear. While much of the old church was destroyed in a fire in 1818, it was reconstructed in 1863. The church was extensively repaired and redecorated in 1962, and an organ was added by the German builder Jürgen Ahrend in 2004. The town hall building was designed by architect Arnstein Arneberg.

The Nøstetangen Museum at the old county farm (Sorenskrivergården), shows how glass was made according to ancient tradition. Nøstetangen glassworks operated here from 1741 to 1777, and produced table-glass and chandeliers in the German and English styles. Adjacent to the museum's garden is the Skriverparken, a park area extending down to river.

== Sport ==
The Vinsvollbanen is a motorcycle speedway venue located south of the town. It hosted the final of the Norwegian Individual Speedway Championship in 1988, 1995, 2005 and 2011.

== Notable residents ==
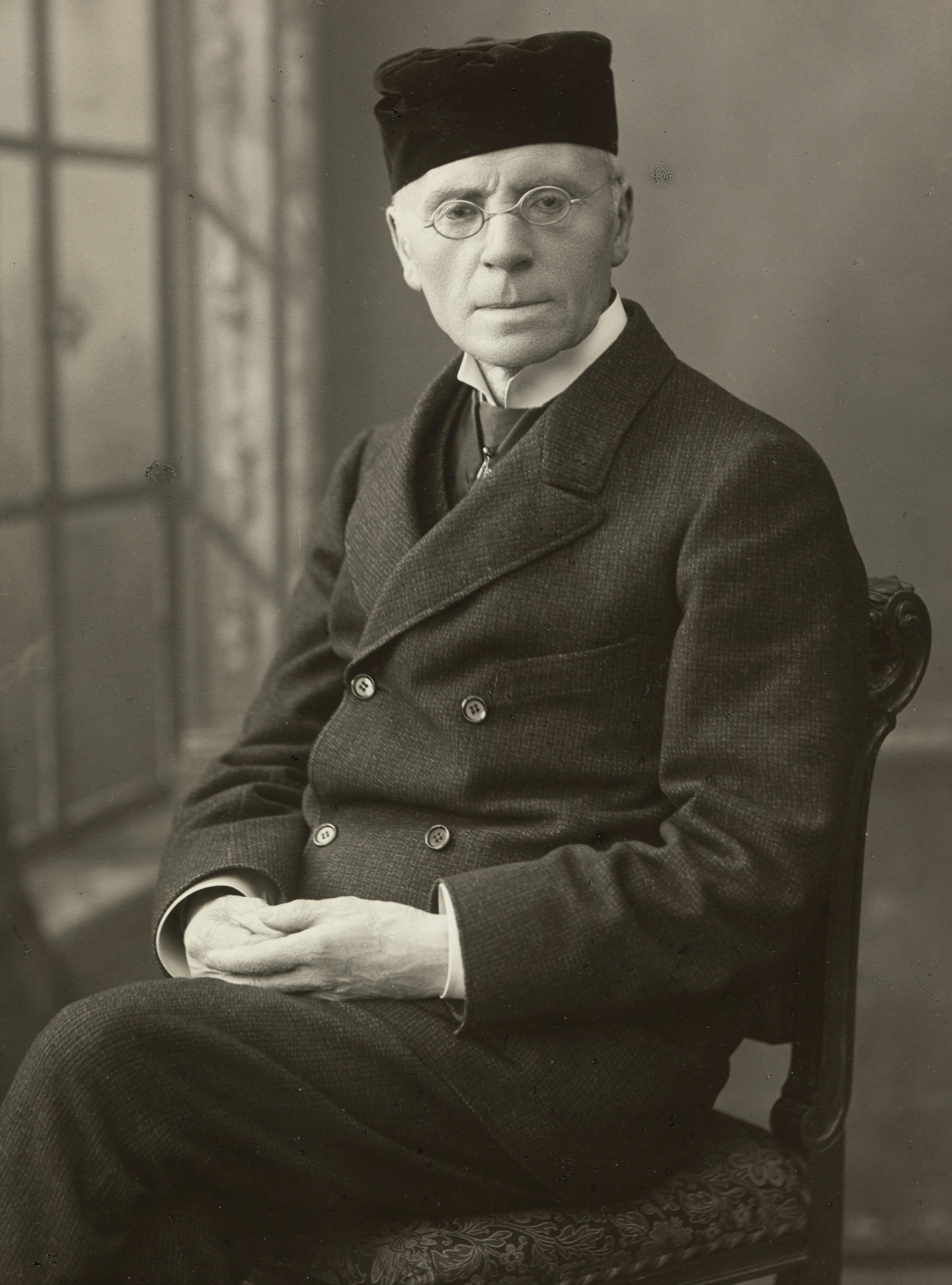
Jonas Lie

- Jonas Lie (1833-1908), novelist, poet, and playwright.
- Arne Nævra, (born 1953) politician and parliamentary representative
- Ole Bremseth, (born 1961) a former ski jumper
- Martinius Stenshorne, (born 2006) a racing driver
