= Borger Kristoffersson Hoen =

Norwegian politician

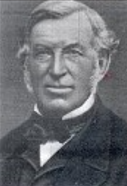
Borger Kristoffersson Hoen

Borger Kristoffersson Hoen (5 June 1799 – 10 May 1877) was a Norwegian farmer and politician.

Hoen was born on the Vølstad farm at Øvre Eiker in Buskerud, Norway. He was the son of Christopher Borgersen Hoen, who had served on the Norwegian Constitutional Assembly at Eidsvoll in 1814. In 1791, his father had acquired the Nedre Hoen farm which he inherited. His father was a supporter of the Haugean Movement (haugianere). Hans Nielsen Hauge visited Nedre Hoen several times, and the farm was an important center of Haugeans in Eiker.

Hoen was elected to the Norwegian Parliament in 1842 and 1845, representing the rural constituency of Buskeruds Amt (now Buskerud).
