= Formoe =

Formoe is a Norwegian surname. Notable people with the surname include:

- Arild Formoe (1912–2006), Norwegian accordion player and orchestra conductor
- Terje Formoe (born 1949), Norwegian singer, songwriter, actor, playwright, and author
