= Hoen treasure =

Viking Age hoard from Norway

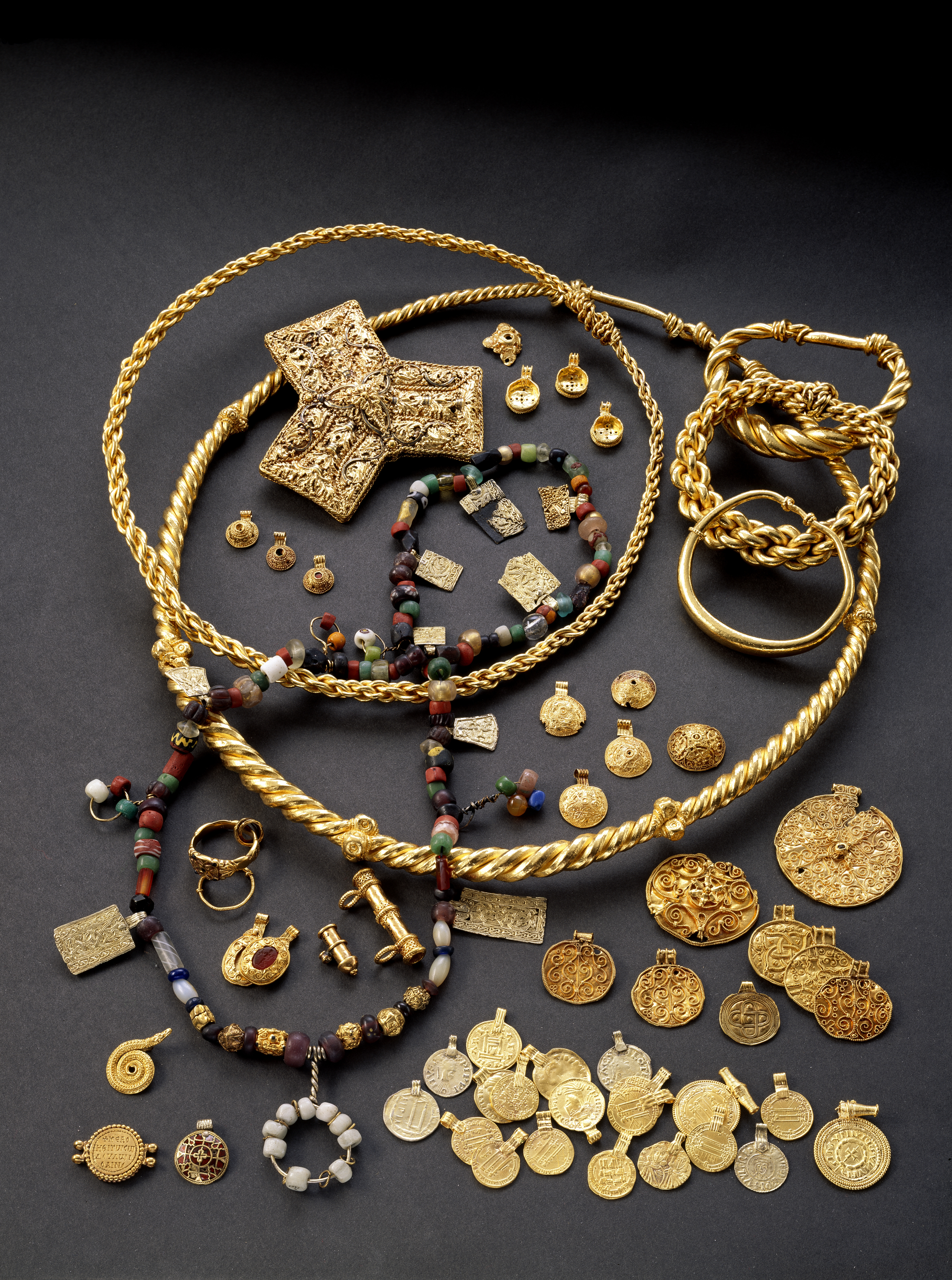

The Hoen treasure or Hon hoard (Norwegian: Hoenskatten or Hon-funnet) is a late-ninth-century hoard now preserved in the Museum of Cultural History, Oslo, as one of the most important Scandinavian finds of precious objects from the Viking period. The treasure, comprising 207 pieces in total, including 54 gold or silver-gilt objects, 20 coins, and 132 beads variously of glass or stone, was discovered by a farm worker at Hokksund in the county of Buskerud, south-eastern Norway, in 1834. During the Second World War, the collection was hidden from the German occupiers of Norway in Fagernes. The disparate origins of the items in the hoard, some of which were exhibited internationally in 1980, reflect Viking-age Norway's connections to Western Europe and the Middle East.
