= Arild Formoe =

Norwegian musician (1912–2006)

Arild Formoe (May 4, 1912 – December 2, 2006) was a Norwegian accordion player and orchestra conductor throughout the 20th century.

== Life and work ==
Formoe was born in Modum. He taught himself to play accordion by practicing three hours a day. He debuted as a soloist on Norwegian radio in 1934. In 1938 he founded the Rytmen (Rhythm) Orchestra together with the fiddler Gunvald Winaasen, bass player Arvid Gunnerud, and guitarist Knut Eriksen. In 1944 he was employed by Harald Henschien's accordion factory in Hønefoss. Henschien started an accordion studio in Hønefoss with teaching across the country. Formoe was an active driving force in this project.

After the war, the Arild Formoe Quartet (Arild Formoes kvartett) was formed. This quartet played many times on the radio (NRK), performed many concerts, and released some gramophone recordings. In 1952, Formoe and his wife Elfrid established the Hønefoss accordion school. From 1952 to 1987, Formoe taught over 10,000 students.

Accordion clubs were established in many places, and Arild Formoe was the conductor of five orchestras:

- The Hønefoss Accordion Orchestra (Hønefoss trekkspillorkester)
- The Formoe Student Orchestra (Formoes elevorkester)
- The Skotselv Accordion Club (Skotselv trekkspillklubb)
- The Drammen Accordion Club (Drammen trekkspillklubb)
- The Eidsvoll Accordion Club (Eidsvoll trekkspillklubb)

== Awards ==
Formoe received the King's Medal of Merit for his work. Formoe and his wife received the Buskerud County Cultural Award in 1993.
