= Christopher Borgersen Hoen =

Norwegian politician

Norwegian Constitutional Assembly
- In office 1814–1814

Personal details
- Born: 26 August 1767 Eiker, Norway
- Died: 17 May 1845 (aged 77)
- Children: Borger Kristoffersson Hoen
- Occupation: Farmer

Christopher Borgersen Hoen (26 August 1767 – 17 May 1845) was a Norwegian farmer and politician.

== Life ==
Christopher Hoen was born on the Vølstad farm in Øvre Eiker in the county of Buskerud, Norway. In 1791, he acquired the Hoen farm (Nedre Hoen i Øvre Eiker). Christopher Hoen became one of the richest and most influential farmers in the area. Hoen was also a prominent Haugean and supporter of revivalist and lay minister Hans Nielsen Hauge. His farm became the center of a large circle of Haugeans in Eiker. In 1797, he held a prayer meeting for the local farmers with Hans Nilsen Hauge. The parish priest demanded that the assembly had to be dissolved. The Conventicle Act of 1741 (Konventikkelplakaten) prohibited any religious meetings without the parish priest's approval. The meeting resulted in an attempt to arrest both men. The farmers created a diversion while Hoen and Hauge both escaped.

Hoen enjoyed a great reputation and was well-trusted. During the emergency war years 1807–1808, he was entrusted with the distribution of moss-like grain surrogate for the poor, and he managed the Eiker granary from 1810 to 1824. He represented Buskerud at the Norwegian Constituent Assembly at Eidsvoll in 1814, together with Frederik Schmidt, who was vicar of Eger, and Johan Collett, who was County Governor of Buskerud.

== Legacy ==
His son, Borger Christophersen Hoen, inherited the Hoen farm and later served in the Norwegian Parliament as a representative from Buskerud.

== Related Reading ==
- Wee, Mons Olson (1919) Haugeanism: A Brief Sketch of the Movement and Some of Its Chief Exponents (Harvard University)
