= Nedre Eiker =

Nedre Eiker Municipality Nedre Eiker kommune
- Former municipality
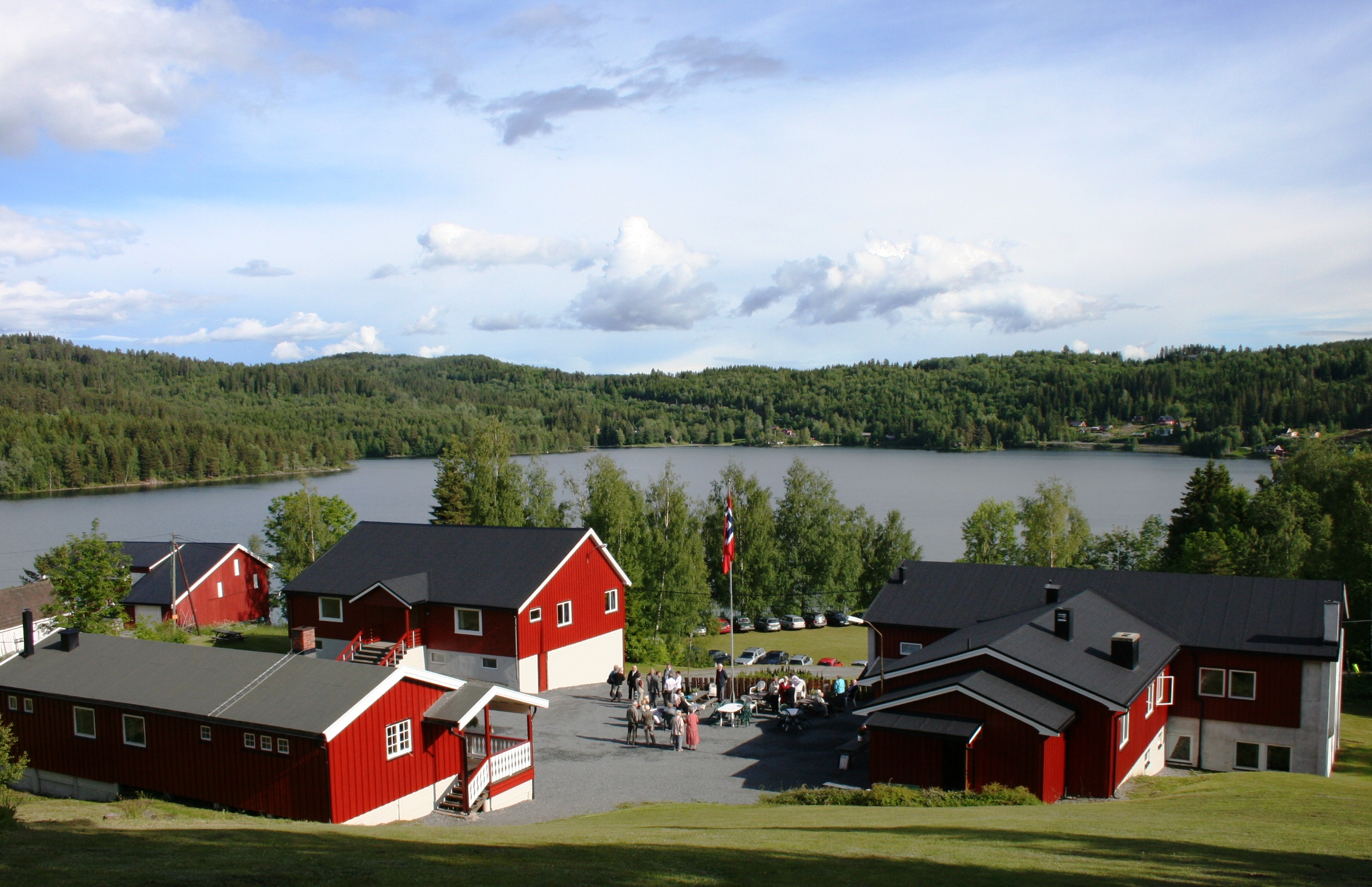

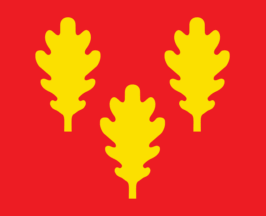
- Flag Coat of arms

- Buskerud within Norway

- Nedre Eiker within Buskerud
- Coordinates: 59°45′53″N 10°2′0″E
- Country: Norway
- County: Buskerud
- District: Eiker, Lower Buskerud
- Administrative centre: Mjøndalen

Government
  - Mayor (2018): Bent Inge Bye (Ap)

Area (upon dissolution)
  - Total: 122 km^{2} (47 sq mi)
  - Land: 114 km^{2} (44 sq mi)
  - Rank: #369 in Norway

Population (2003)
  - Total: 21,377
  - Rank: #42 in Norway
  - Density: 187/km^{2} (480/sq mi)
  - Change (10 years): ▲ +11.5%
- Demonym: Eikværing

Official language
  - Norwegian form: Bokmål
- Time zone: UTC+01:00 (CET)
  - Summer (DST): UTC+02:00 (CEST)
- ISO 3166 code: NO-0625
- Website: Official website

Nedre Eiker was a municipality in Buskerud county, Norway. It is part of the traditional region of Eiker. The administrative centre of the municipality is the village of Mjøndalen. The old municipality of Eiker was divided into Nedre Eiker (lower Eiker) and Øvre Eiker (upper) on 1 July 1885. The municipality was merged with Drammen Municipality in 2020.

== General information ==
=== Name ===
The Old Norse form of the name was Eikjar. The name is the plural form of eiki which means "oak wood". The meaning of Nedre Eiker is "(the) lower (part of) Eiker". (The municipality of Eiker was divided in 1885.)

=== Coat-of-arms ===
The coat-of-arms was granted on 26 June 1970. The arms show three gold-colored oak leaves on a red background. The arms are canting because the meaning of the name (Eik) comes from the word for oak.

Number of minorities (1st and 2nd generation) in Nedre Eiker by country of origin in 2017
Ancestry	Number
Poland	768
Turkey	488
Vietnam	410
Lithuania	290
Afghanistan	239
Iraq	230
India	198
Iran	170
Kosovo	143
Sweden	136

== Geography ==
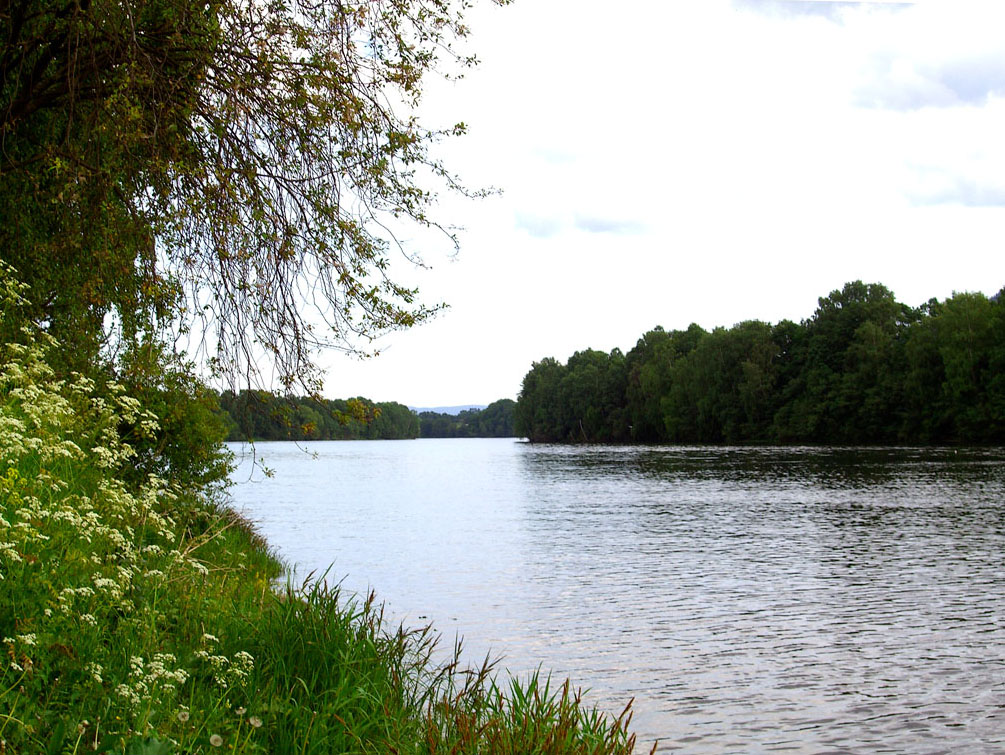
Drammenselva river

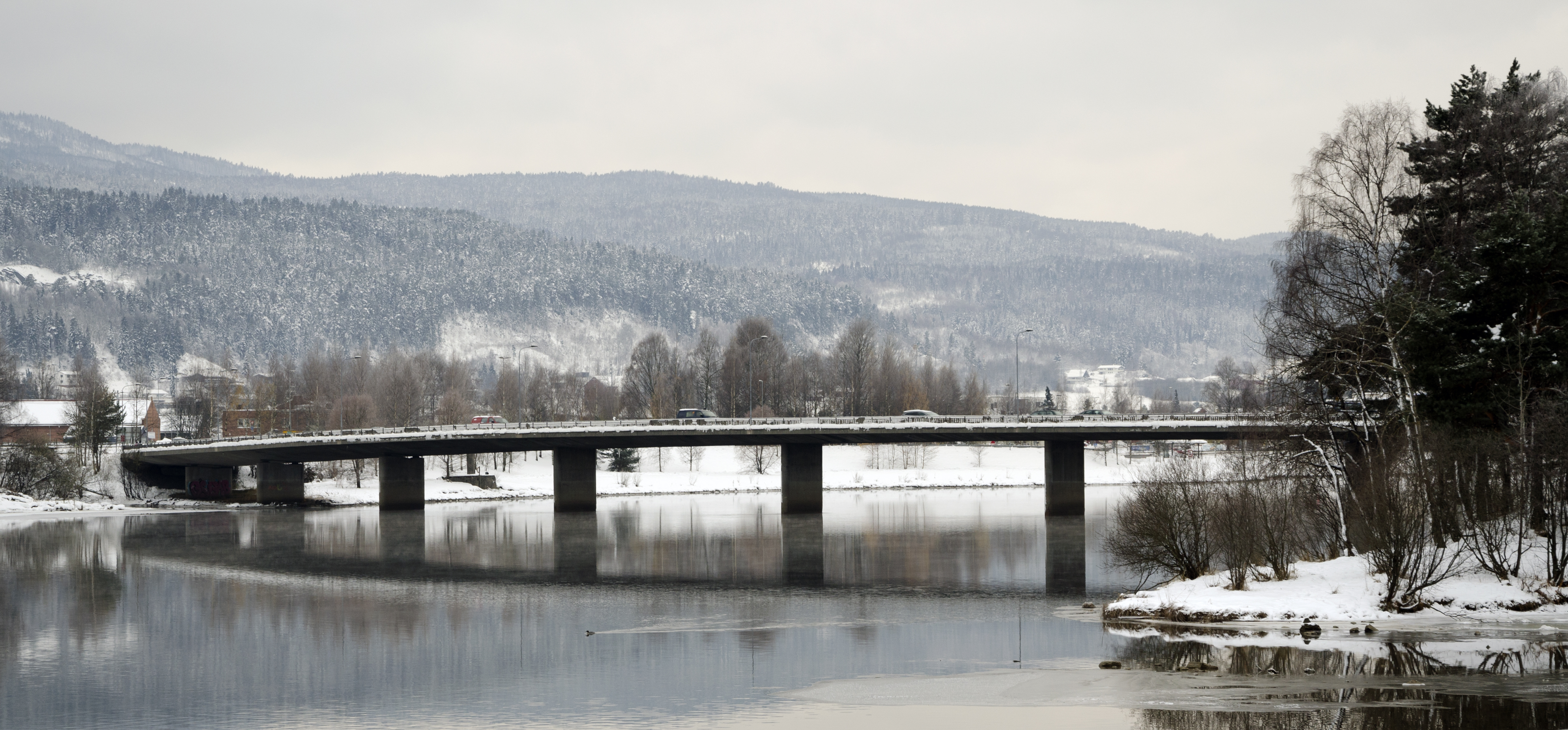
Nedre Eiker bridge

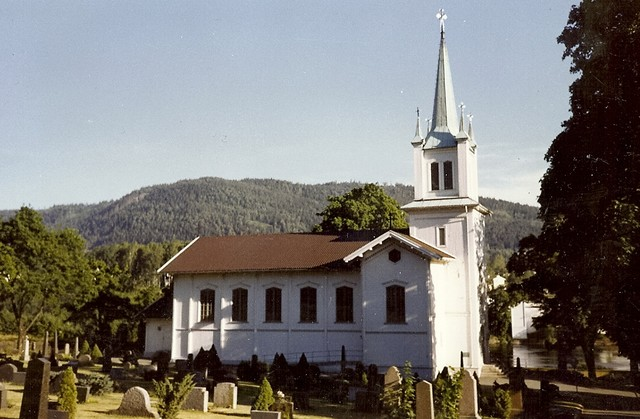
Nedre Eiker Church

The municipality is located in the southern part of Buskerud county. It borders the municipalities of Lier, Drammen, Hof, and Øvre Eiker. The majority of the residents live in the villages of Mjøndalen, Krokstadelva, Solbergelva, and Steinberg.

The Drammenselva River flows through the municipality of Nedre Eiker. It is one of the largest rivers in Norway, with a course running from Tyrifjorden in the north to Drammensfjord in the south.

== Churches in Nedre Eiker ==
- Mjøndalen Church
- Nedre Eiker Church
- Solberg Chapel
- Tabor Chapel

== Notable residents ==
- Lars Korvald, former Prime Minister of Norway
- Herman Wildenvey (1886–1959), poet and author
- Svein Johannessen (1937–2007), international master of chess
- Jørn Hurum (b. 1967), paleontologist
- Ragnar Christiansen (born 1922), former Minister and Member of Parliament

== Sister cities ==
The following cities are twinned with Nedre Eiker:

- Enköping, Uppsala County, Sweden
