= Ormåsen =

Village in Øvre Eiker Municipality, Norway

Coordinates: 59.7581°N 9.83111°E

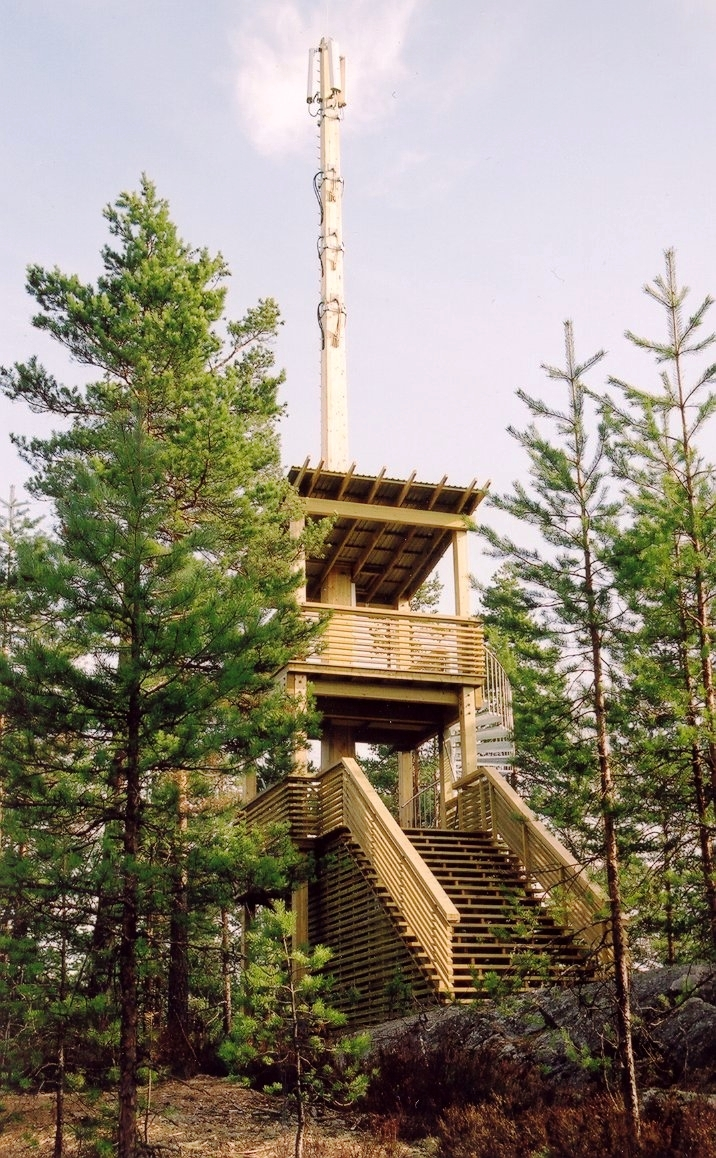
Lookout tower for weather station at Ormåsen

Ormåsen is a village in Buskerud, Norway. It is a 0.41 square kilometres (0.16 sq mi) residential area located the municipality of Øvre Eiker. The village was built during 1986. Ormåsen is located midway between Hokksund and Vestfossen. As of 2005, the population was 809. Ormåsen has a private weather station which is located approximately 280 metres (920 ft) above sea level.
