= Harald Henschien =

Norwegian accordionist, composer, accordion manufacturer and editor

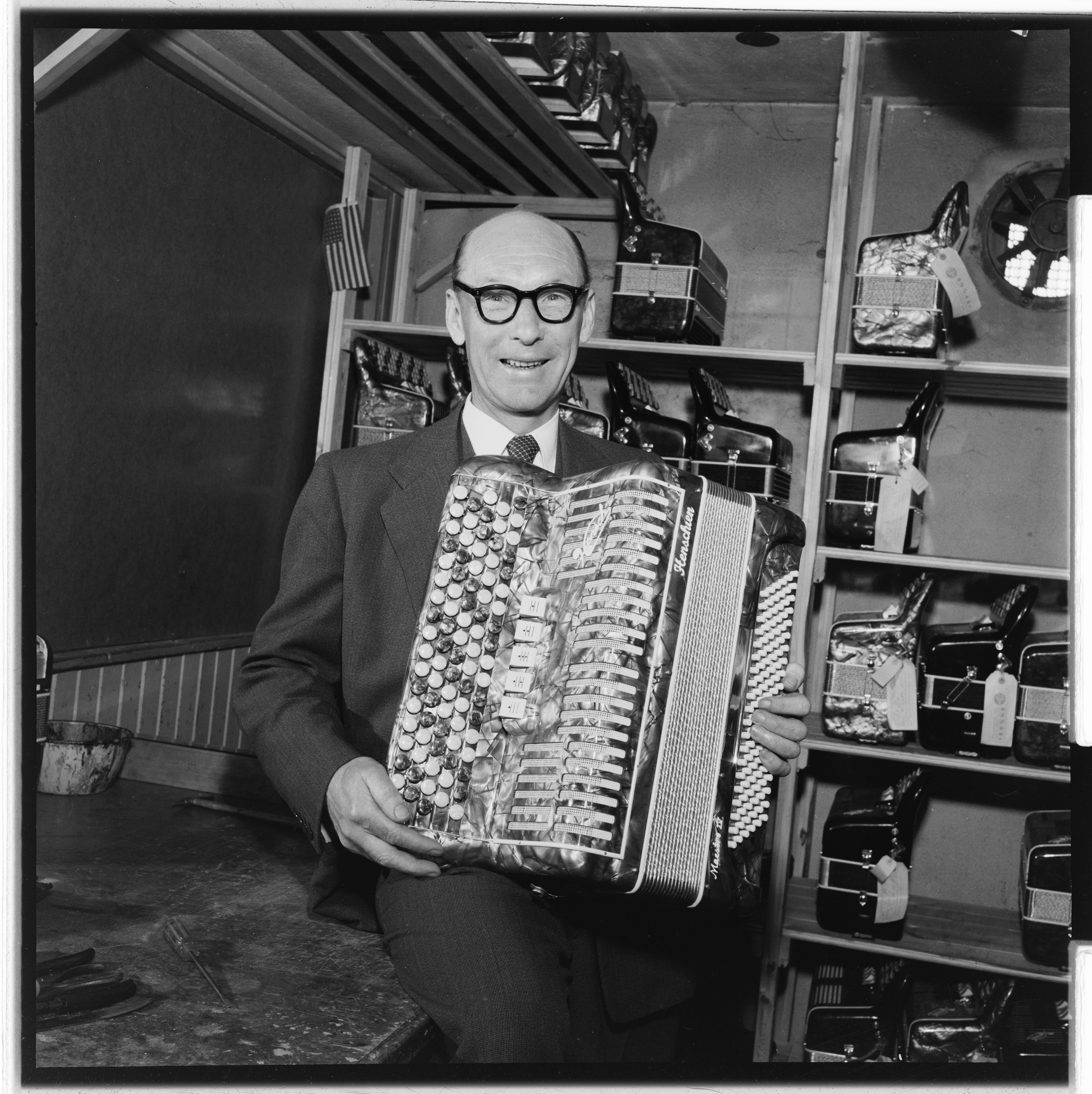
- Harald Henschien at the Henschien Accordion Factory in Hønefoss in 1954
- Born: May 2, 1902; Øvre Eiker, Norway
- Died: June 12, 1968 (aged 66); Hønefoss, Norway
- Occupations: Accordionist, composer, accordion manufacturer, magazine editor

Harald Trygve Henschien (May 6, 1902 – June 21, 1968) was an accordionist, composer, accordion manufacturer, editor, and the founder of the music magazine Rytme (Rhythm). He started his career as a performing musician at age 13 and became a prominent figure in Norwegian accordion and popular music.

== Background ==
Harald Henschien was born at the Øvre Hoen farm in Øvre Eiker in Buskerud county. He was the son of Theodor Catrinus Henschien (1855–1919) and Helga Hallstensdatter Gullingsrud (1872–1954) from the village of Bromma in the municipality of Nes.

== Career ==
After several tours with various artists, Henschien came to Hønefoss in the municipality of Ringerike in 1924, where he settled and founded the Henschien Music Company (Henschiens musikkfirma). The company offered musical material (recorded music, music booklets, sheet music, etc.) and photography material. He also founded his own accordion factory at the site.

Henschien started appearing on radio in 1925, and in 1928 he started the Henschien Trio (Henschiens Trio) together with the violinist Trygve Olai Johannessen and pianist Gunnar Søberg. The trio became known throughout Norway and made a number of recordings. Henschien himself recorded an accordion duet with Alf Hansen for the record label Odeon in the early 1920s. Altogether, Henschien produced over 100 recordings from 1922 to 1937, including for the companies Brunswick Records, Columbia Records, His Master's Voice, Musica, Polydor Records, and Telefunken.

Later, Henschien also made a name for himself in music education, including with a correspondence school that became popular throughout Scandinavia.

In 1936, Henschien founded the Henschien Accordion Factory (Henschien Trekkspillfabrikk). The factory became the only one of its kind in Norway. However, due to strong competition from Italian manufacturers, it stopped operating in 1958. During its 22 years of operation, the factory produced 6,810 accordions, divided into twelve models. Several of the models were produced in such small numbers that today they are regarded as unique collectibles. The most popular model was the "Hensch," and 3,948 of them were produced. The rarest was the "Henschien Special," of which only 10 to 20 were produced.

The magazine Rytme (Rhythm) was founded in 1941, during the Second World War, with a hiatus in 1943 and 1944 because of a lack of paper. Today, it is considered an important source of early popular music because it contained not only material about accordion music, but also about popular music at that time. Rytme was published for over 20 years, and it was edited by Leif Berg (1900–1955), who was succeeded by Arnt Haugen (1928–1988) from 1955 to 1962.

By the time accordion production was discontinued in 1958, Henschien himself had been ill with Parkinson's disease for several years. He died in 1968, at the age of 66. The music store continued to be operated by his family (his daughter and her children) for many years after his death.

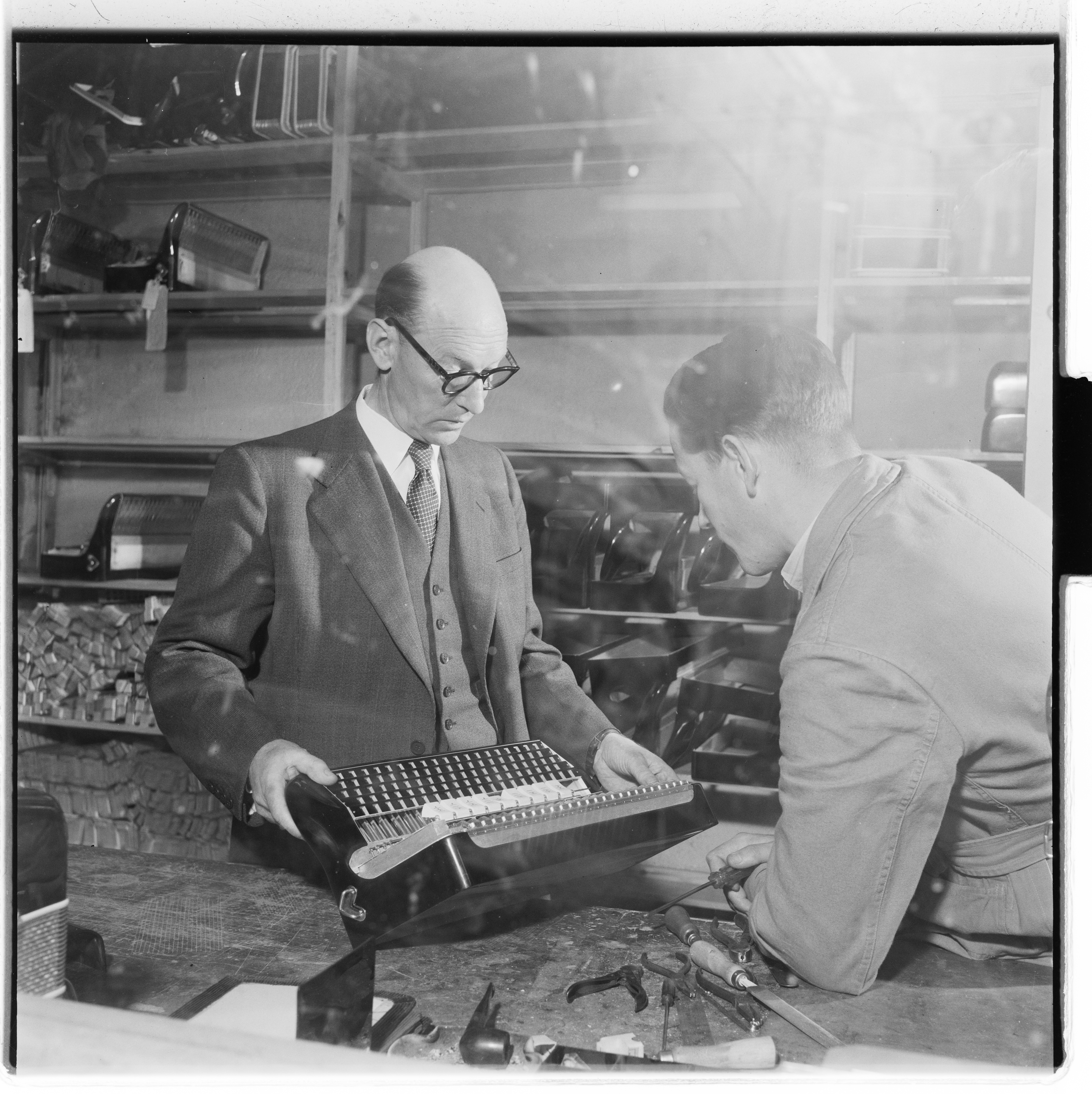
Henschien at the Henschien Accordion Factory in Hønefoss in 1954. The factory closed in 1960.

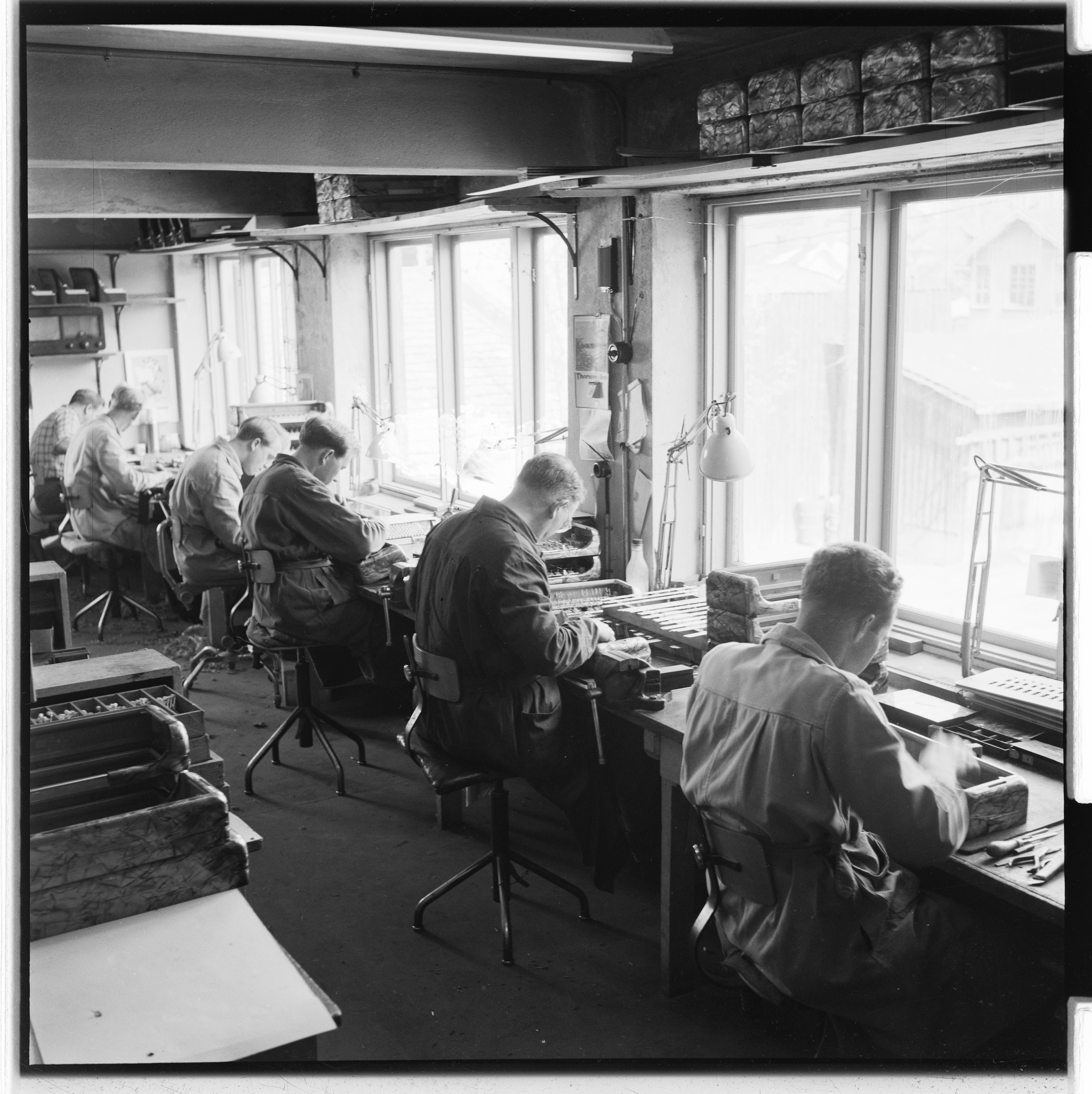
The Henschien Accordion Factory in 1954

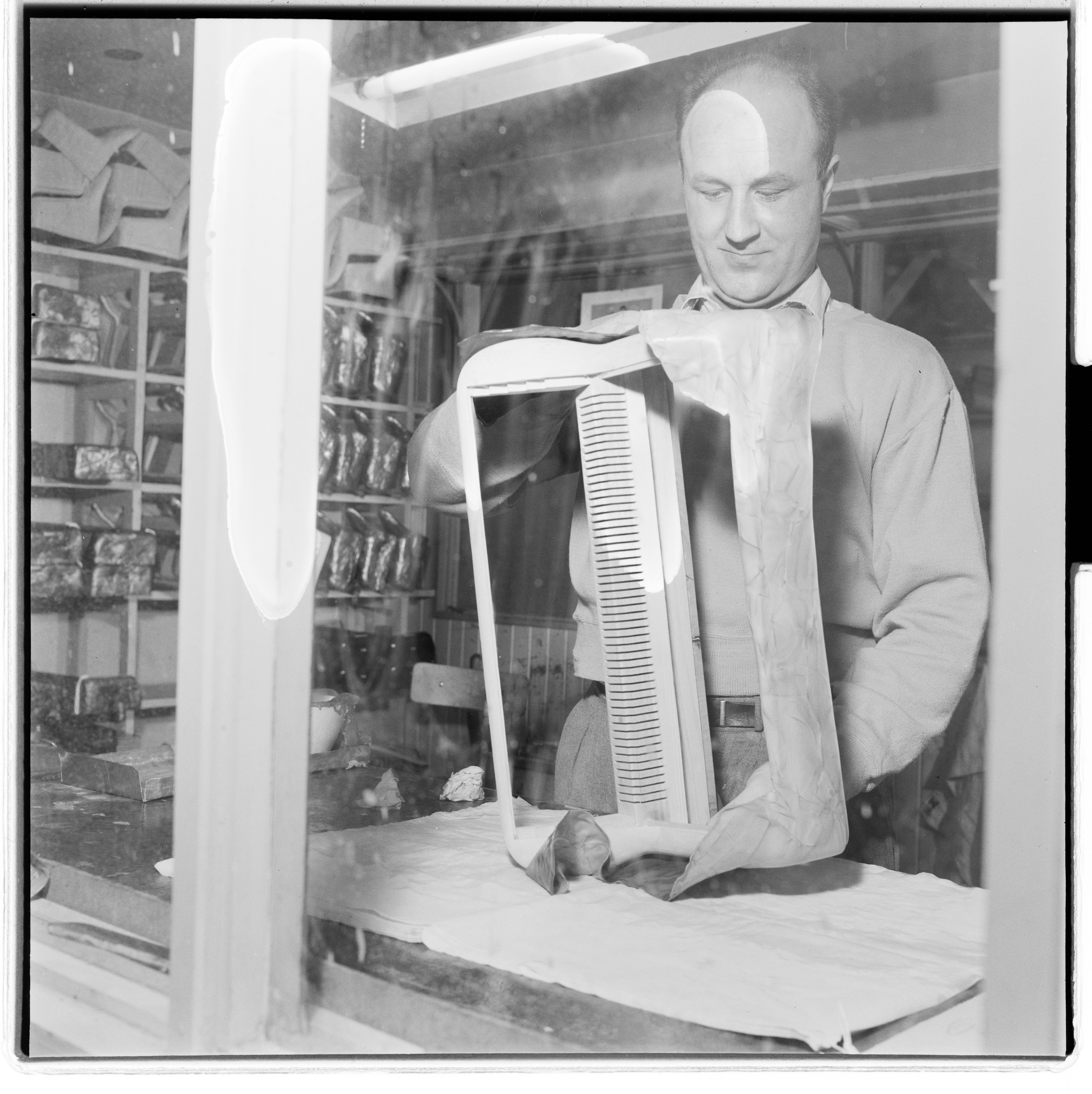
The Henschien Accordion Factory in 1954
