= Øvre Eiker =

Øvre Eiker Municipality Øvre Eiker kommune
- Municipality
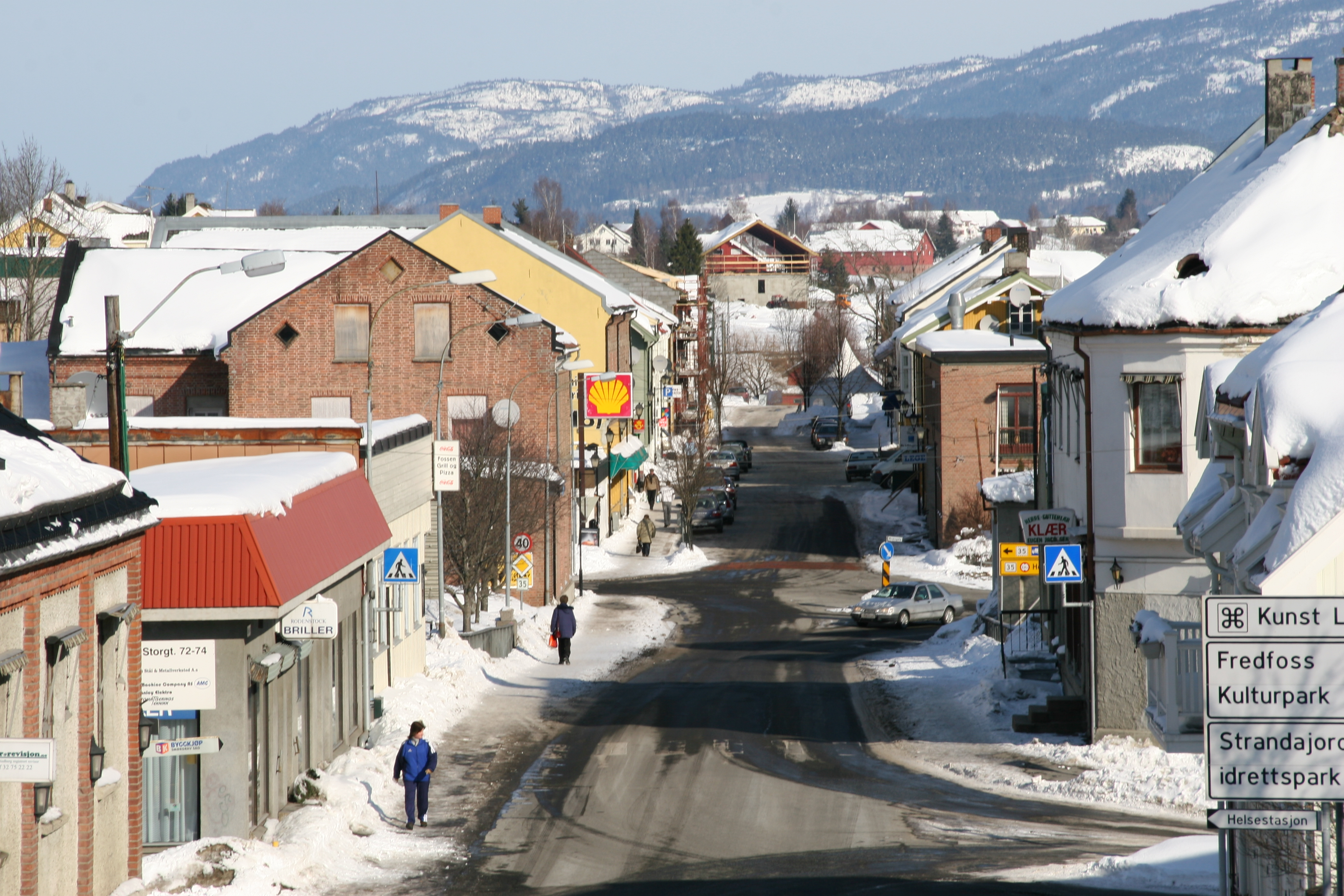
- View of the village of Vestfossen

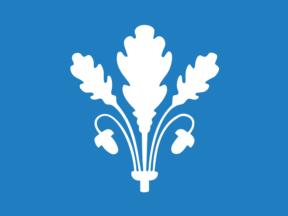
- Flag Coat of arms

- Buskerud within Norway

- Øvre Eiker within Buskerud
- Coordinates: 59°46′19″N 9°50′10″E
- Country: Norway
- County: Buskerud
- District: Eiker, Lower Buskerud
- Administrative centre: Hokksund

Government
  - Mayor (2023): Adrian Tollefsen (Conservative Party)

Area
  - Total: 457 km^{2} (176 sq mi)
  - Land: 418 km^{2} (161 sq mi)
  - Rank: #223 in Norway

Population (2022)
  - Total: 20,250
  - Rank: #62 in Norway
  - Density: 37/km^{2} (96/sq mi)
  - Change (10 years): ▲ +4.3%
- Demonym: Eikværing

Official language
  - Norwegian form: Bokmål
- Time zone: UTC+01:00 (CET)
  - Summer (DST): UTC+02:00 (CEST)
- ISO 3166 code: NO-3314
- Website: Official website

Øvre Eiker is a municipality in Buskerud county, Norway. It is part of the traditional region of Eiker. The administrative centre of the municipality is the village of Hokksund. The old municipality of Eiker was divided into Øvre Eiker (upper Eiker) and Nedre Eiker (lower) on 1 July 1885.

As of 2015, more employees worked for the [municipal] government and in the service sector, than in any other field of employment; even fewer—16 %—are employed in construction or in [electrical] power companies and water companies; [13%] work in the manufacturing sector.

== General information ==
=== Name ===
The Old Norse form of the name was Eikjar. The name is the plural form of eiki which means "oak wood". The meaning of Øvre Eiker is "(the) upper (part of) Eiker". (The municipality of Eiker was divided in 1885.)

=== Coat-of-arms ===
The coat-of-arms is from modern times. They were granted on 24 October 1981. The arms show three silver oak leaves and two acorns on a blue background. The oak is a canting element, since Eik means oak in the Norwegian language.

Number of minorities (1st and 2nd generation) in Øvre Eiker by country of origin in 2017
Ancestry	Number
Poland	611
Lithuania	267
Afghanistan	110
Germany	101
Iceland	96
Denmark	87
Thailand	84
Eritrea	75
Iraq	70
Turkey	67

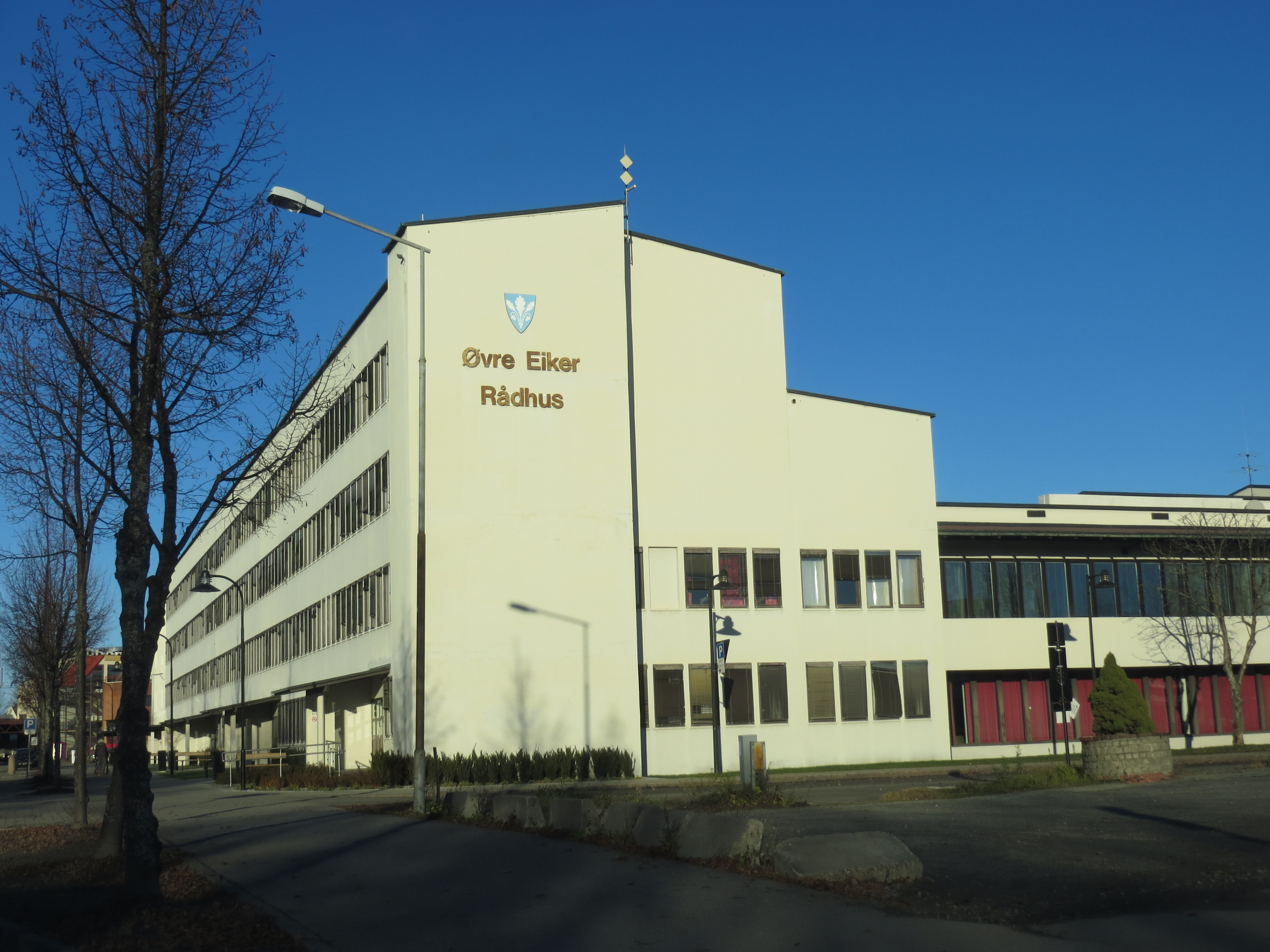
Øvre Eiker Townhall at Hokksund

== Geography ==
Øvre Eiker is a lush valley along Drammenselva with Modum to the north and Drammen to the east. To the south flows Eikeren watercourse, which is dominated by the contiguous Lakes Eikeren and Fiskumvannet. Eikeren is 156 Meters deep and is partly located in Holmestrand municipality in the south. The municipality's highest point, Myrehogget, 707 meters above sea level. is located west, between Øvre Eiker and Flesberg municipality.

About half of the municipality's inhabitants live in the municipal center Hokksund, which in 2021 had 9,514 inhabitants, the rest live mainly in the settlements Vestfossen, Skotselv, Ormåsen, and Darbu.

The municipality is part of the Drammen region and Buskerudbyen, which is a collaboration within transport, environment and health.

=== Climate ===
Øvre Eiker has a warm-summer humid continental climate, characterized by cold winters and mild summers. The areas along the rivers are often some of the warmest in the country during the summer, due to the somewhat inland and low-lying location in a valley with generally little wind. In September 2016, the Hokksund weather station experienced 23 days with temperatures reaching above 20°C, setting a new national record for the month.

Climate data for Hokksund 1991–2020 (15 m, avg high/low 2013–2025)
Month	Jan	Feb	Mar	Apr	May	Jun	Jul	Aug	Sep	Oct	Nov	Dec	Year
Mean daily maximum °C (°F)	−1 (30)	2.1 (35.8)	6.9 (44.4)	12.8 (55.0)	18.1 (64.6)	22.6 (72.7)	24.3 (75.7)	22.4 (72.3)	18.3 (64.9)	11.2 (52.2)	4.6 (40.3)	0.8 (33.4)	11.9 (53.4)
Daily mean °C (°F)	−4.1 (24.6)	−3 (27)	0.9 (33.6)	6 (43)	11.2 (52.2)	15.2 (59.4)	17.5 (63.5)	16.1 (61.0)	11.8 (53.2)	5.5 (41.9)	1 (34)	−3.6 (25.5)	6.2 (43.2)
Mean daily minimum °C (°F)	−8.4 (16.9)	−6.1 (21.0)	−3.5 (25.7)	0.4 (32.7)	5.4 (41.7)	10.1 (50.2)	11.9 (53.4)	10.4 (50.7)	7.9 (46.2)	2.9 (37.2)	−1.3 (29.7)	−5.7 (21.7)	2.0 (35.6)
Average precipitation mm (inches)	40 (1.6)	24 (0.9)	25 (1.0)	39 (1.5)	59 (2.3)	78 (3.1)	83 (3.3)	81 (3.2)	70 (2.8)	91 (3.6)	68 (2.7)	49 (1.9)	707 (27.9)
Source 1: yr.no (mean, precipitaiton)
Source 2: Seklima.no (avg. high/low)

== Energy ==
Hakavik Power Station, startpoint of 55 kV single phase AC grid for traction current.

Hellefoss Power Station, was put into operation in 1952.

Skotselv Power Station started production in 1992.

== Notable residents ==
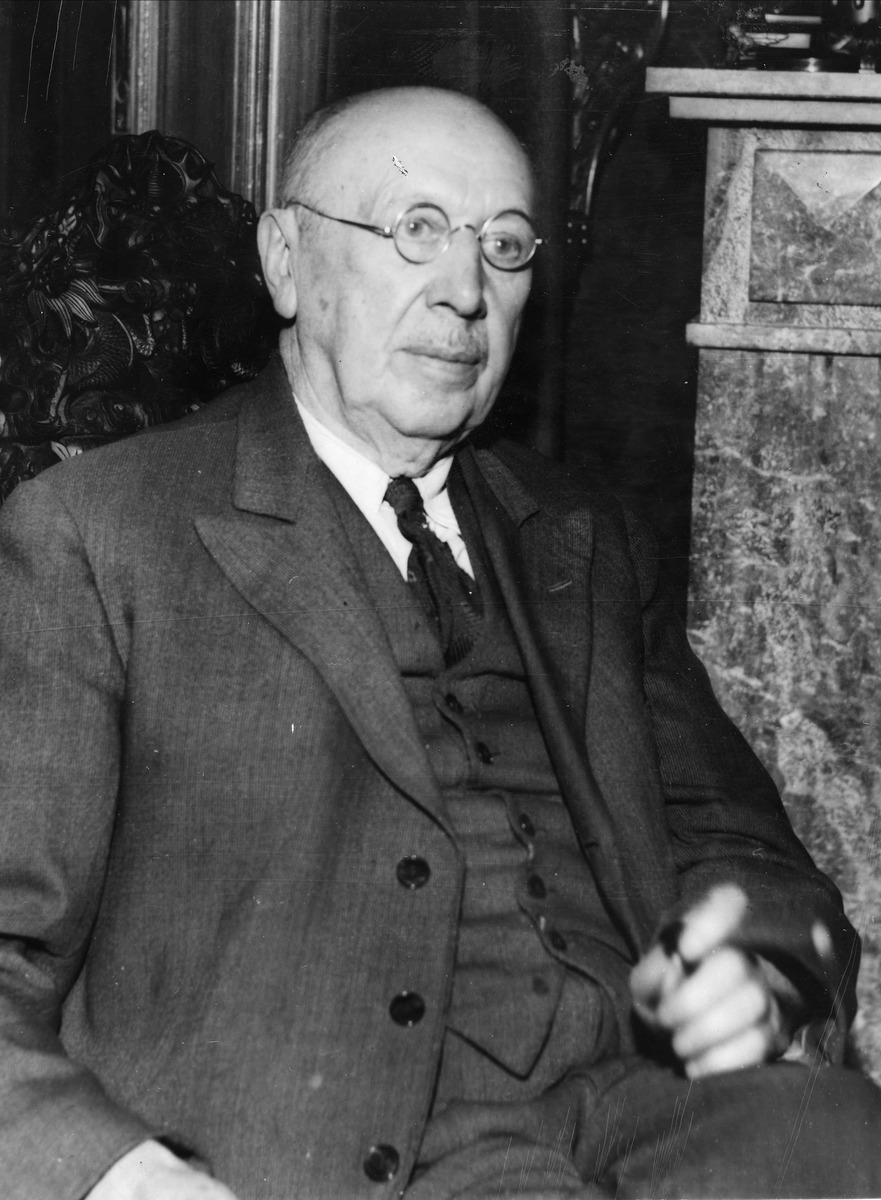
Christopher Hornsrud ca.1930

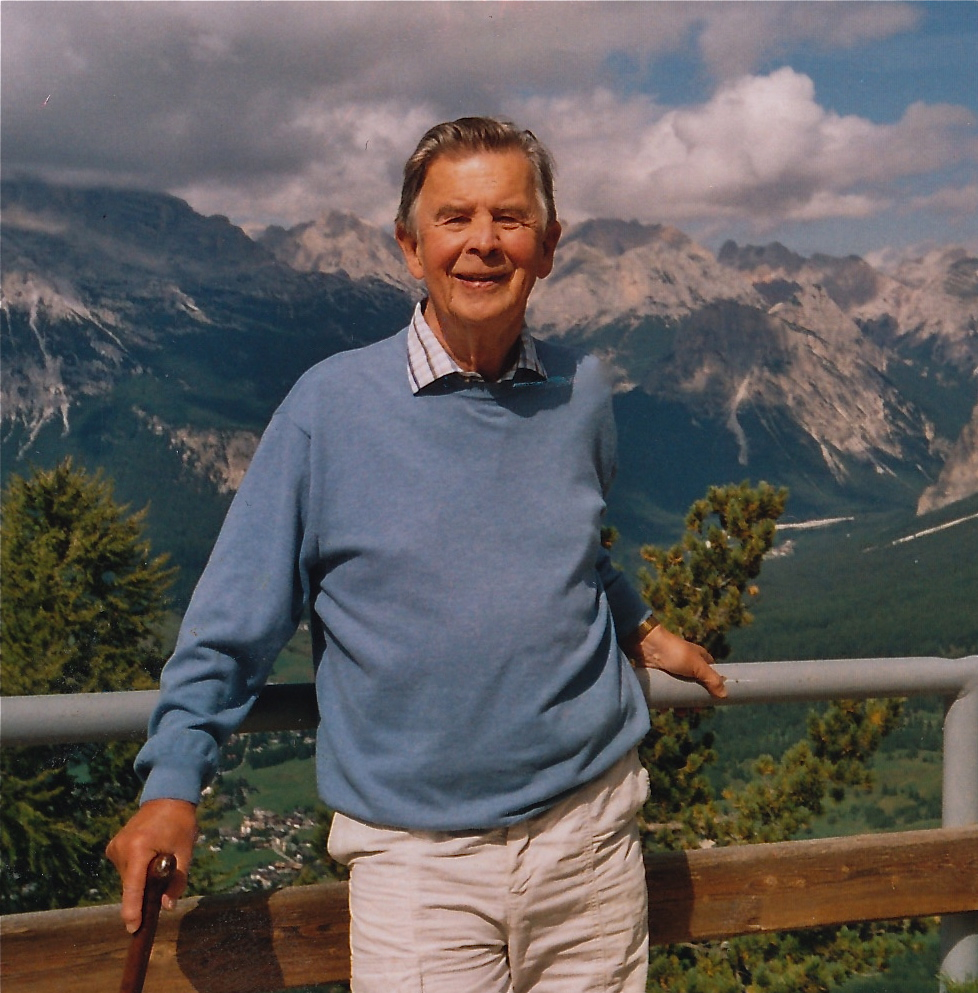
Aage Most, 2006

- Christopher Borgersen Hoen (1767 in Eiker – 1845) farmer and rep. at the Norwegian Constituent Assembly at Eidsvoll in 1814
- Jonas Lie (1833 at Hokksund – 1908) novelist, poet, and playwright
- Olaf Mørch Hansson (1856 in Øvre Eiker – 1912) an actor, theatre director and journalist
- Christopher Hornsrud (1859 in Skotselv – 1960) Prime Minister of Norway in 1928
- Henny Dons (1874 at Aker – 1966) a Norwegian educator and inner missionary
- Hans Dons (1882 in Øvre Eiker – 1940) Navy officer, first manned flight in Norway
- Thina Thorleifsen (1885 in Hokksund – 1959) a politician, active in the women's movement
- Else Halling (1899 in Øvre Eiker – 1987) a Norwegian textile artist
- Harald Henschien (1902 at Øvre Hoen – 1968) accordionist, accordion manufacturer, editor
- Aage Møst (1923 in Skotselv – 2011) a journalist and sports official
- Thorleif Enger (born 1943 in Øvre Eiker) former CEO of Yara International
- Per Olaf Lundteigen (born 1953) farmer and Øvre Eiker municipal councillor 2003/07
- Nikolai Hængsle (born 1978 in Skotselv) a Norwegian bass guitarist, member of BigBang
- Masud Gharahkhani (born 1982) an Iranian-Norwegian politician, brought up in Skotselv

=== Sport ===
- Randi Thorvaldsen (1925 in Fiskum – 2011) a champion speedskater in the early 1950s
- Jorunn Horgen (born 1966 in Hokksund) a windsurfer, world champion in 1980s & 90s
- Mona Bollerud (born 1968 in Fiskum) former biathlete, World Championship medallist
- Gustav Wikheim (born 1993 in Hokksund) a Norwegian footballer with over 200 club caps
- Lucas Braathen (born 2000 in Hokksund) a Brazilian alpine skier
- Martinius Stenshorne (born 2006 in Hokksund) a Norwegian racing driver

== International relations ==
=== Twin towns — Sister cities ===
The following cities are twinned with Øvre Eiker:

- Kerteminde, Region of Southern Denmark, Denmark
- Lempäälä, Western Finland, Finland
- Ulricehamn, Västra Götaland County, Sweden

== Gallery ==
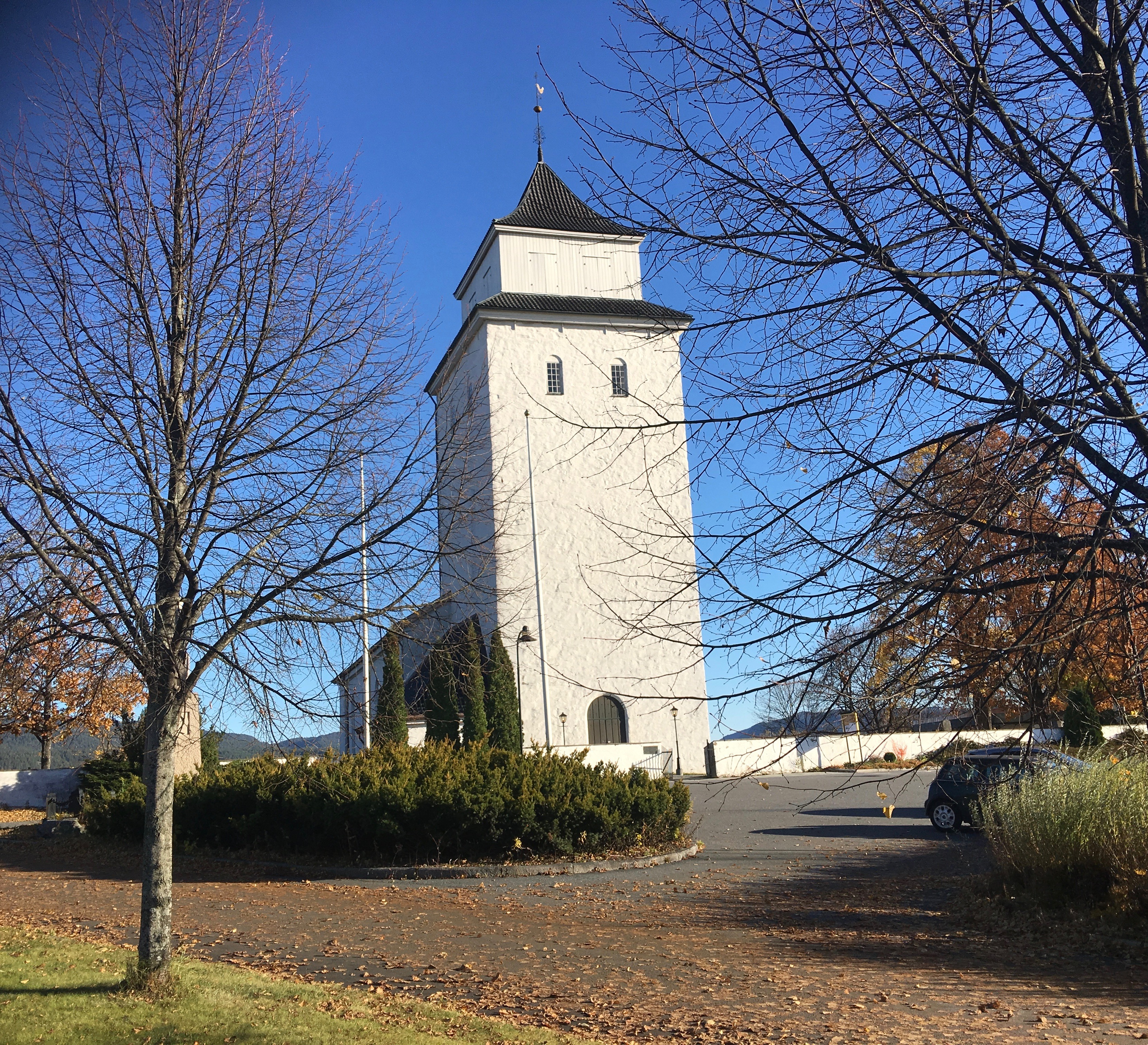
Haug Church in Hokksund

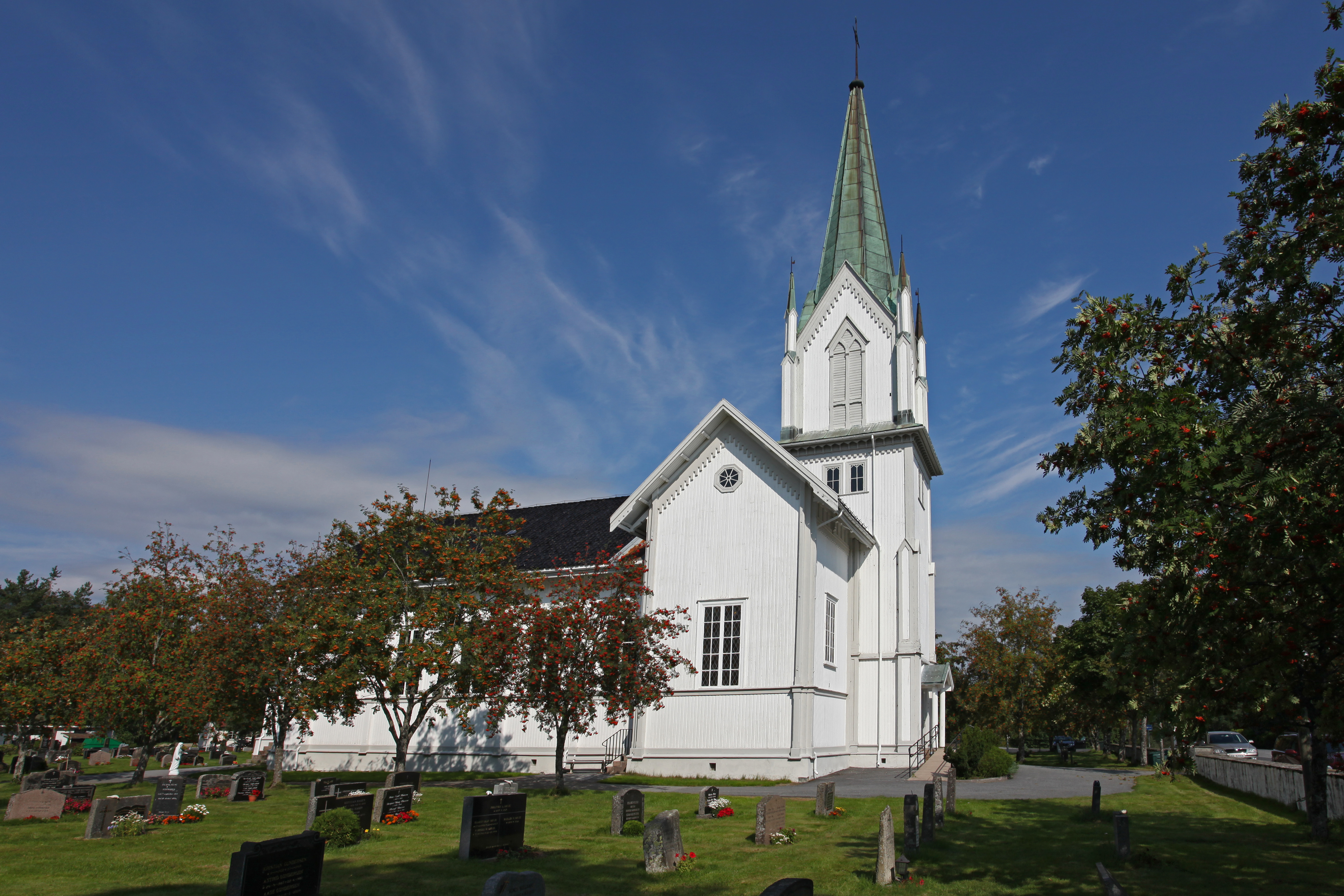
Bakke Church

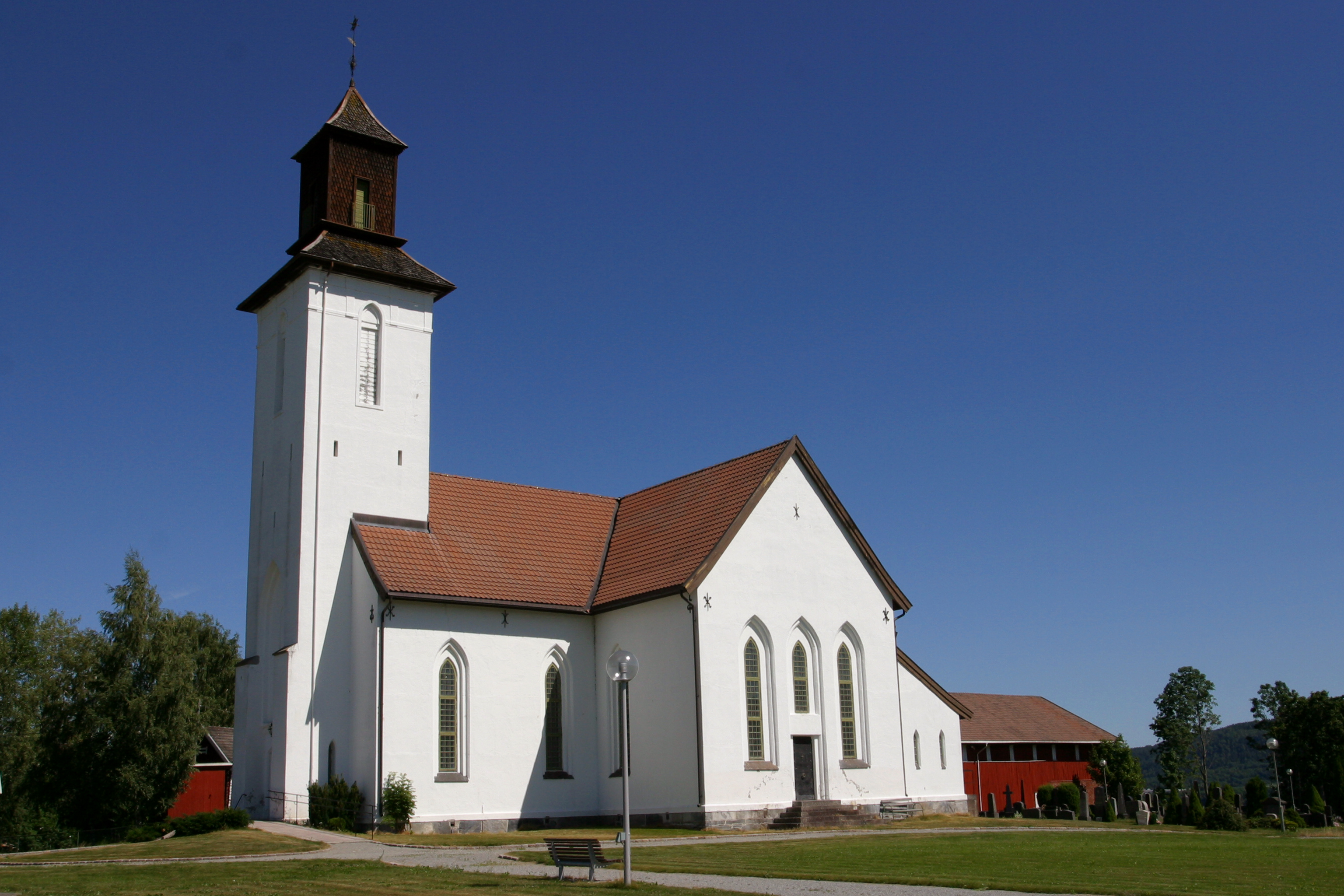
Fiskum Church

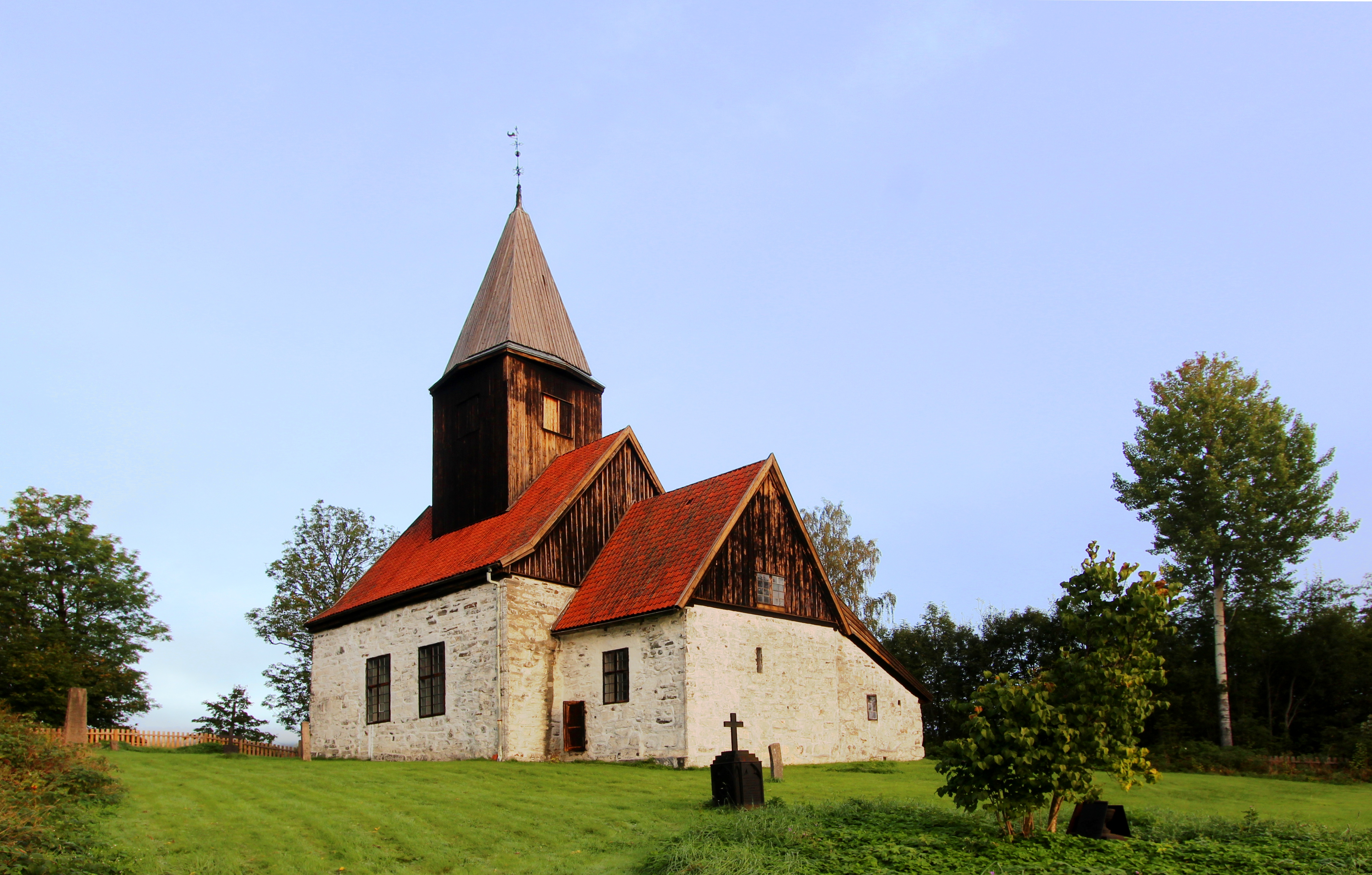
Old Fiskum Church

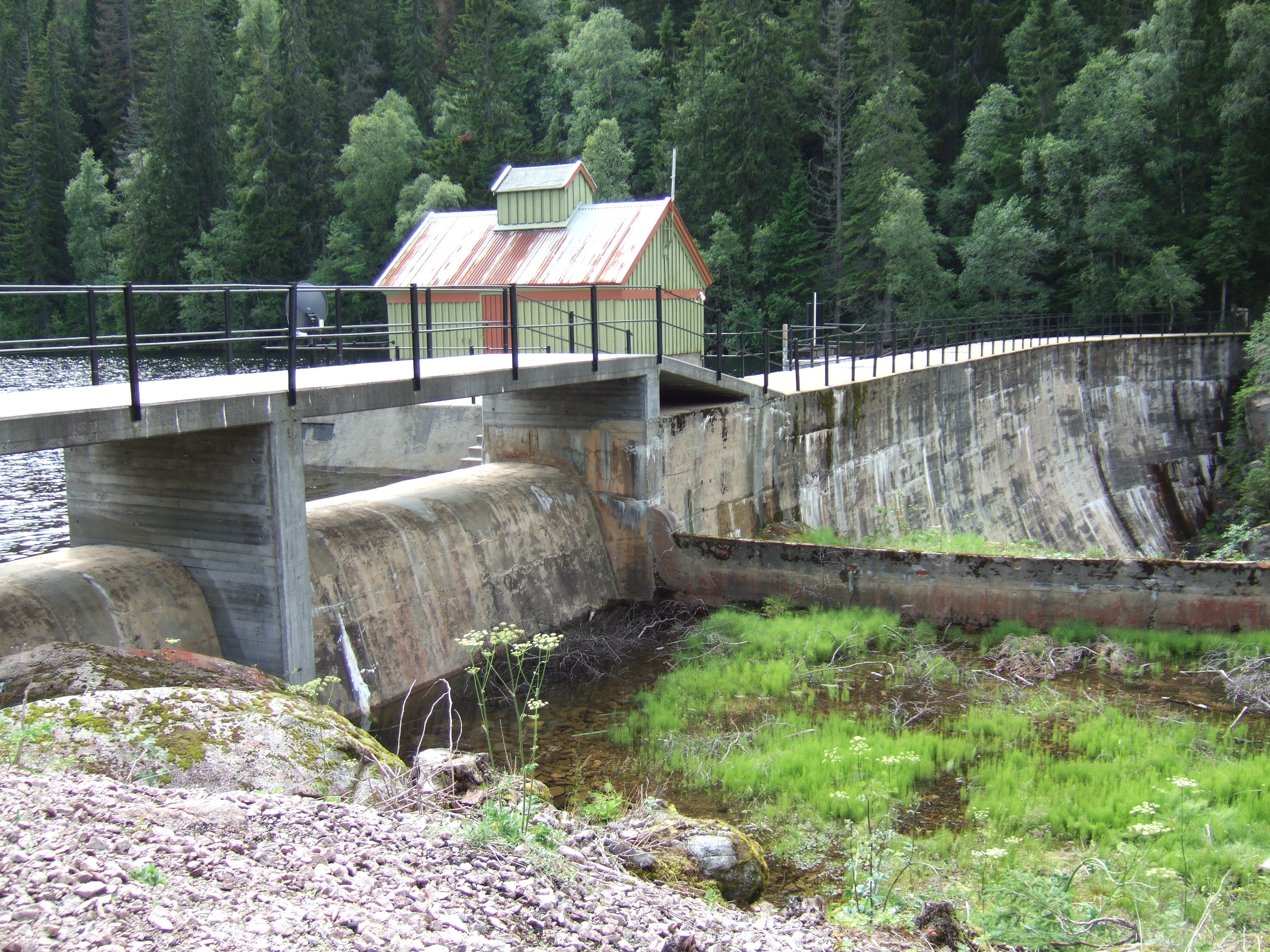
Øksnevann Dam

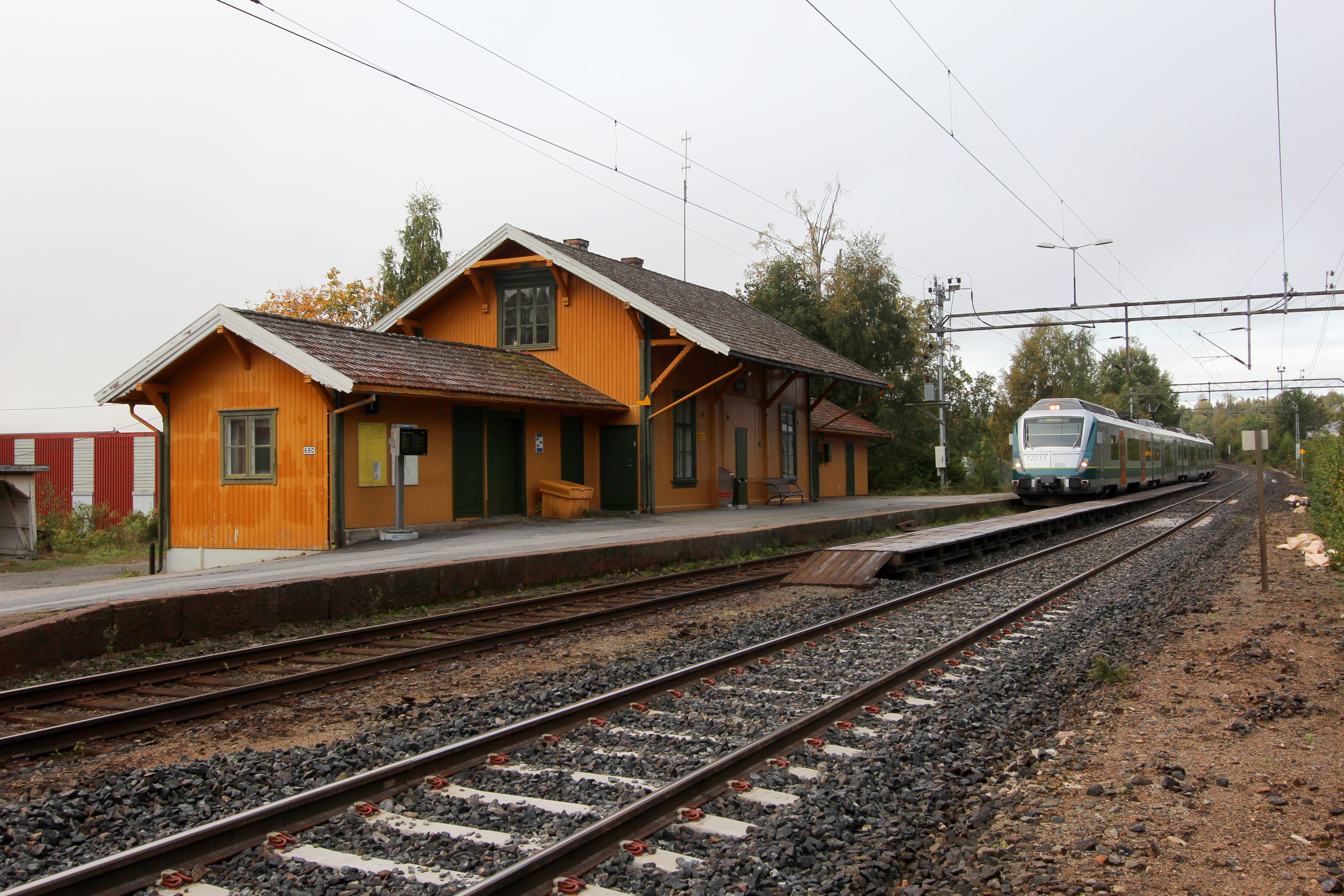
Darbu Station

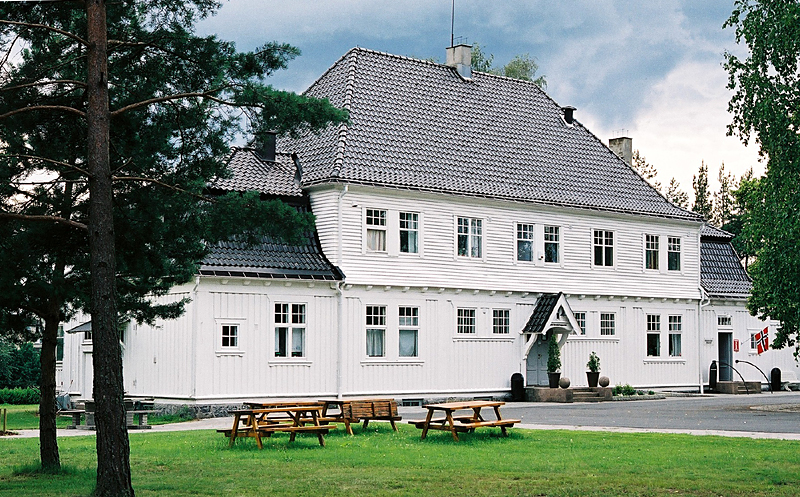
Nøstetangen Museum in Hokksund

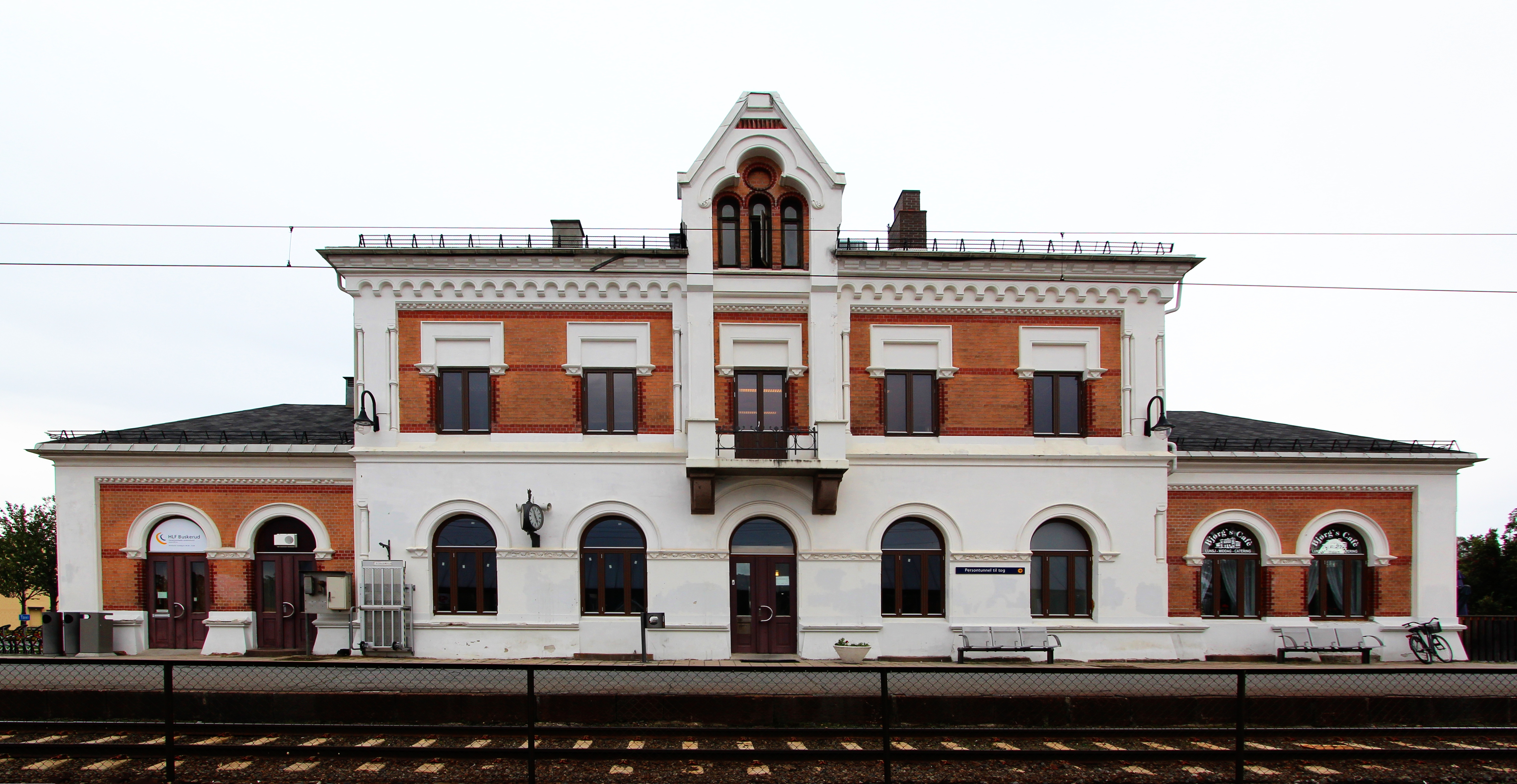
Hokksund Station
