= Museum of Cultural History, Oslo =

Museum in Norway

Coordinates: 59°55′0.5″N 10°44′7.7″E

Museum of Cultural History
- Kulturhistorisk museum (KHM)
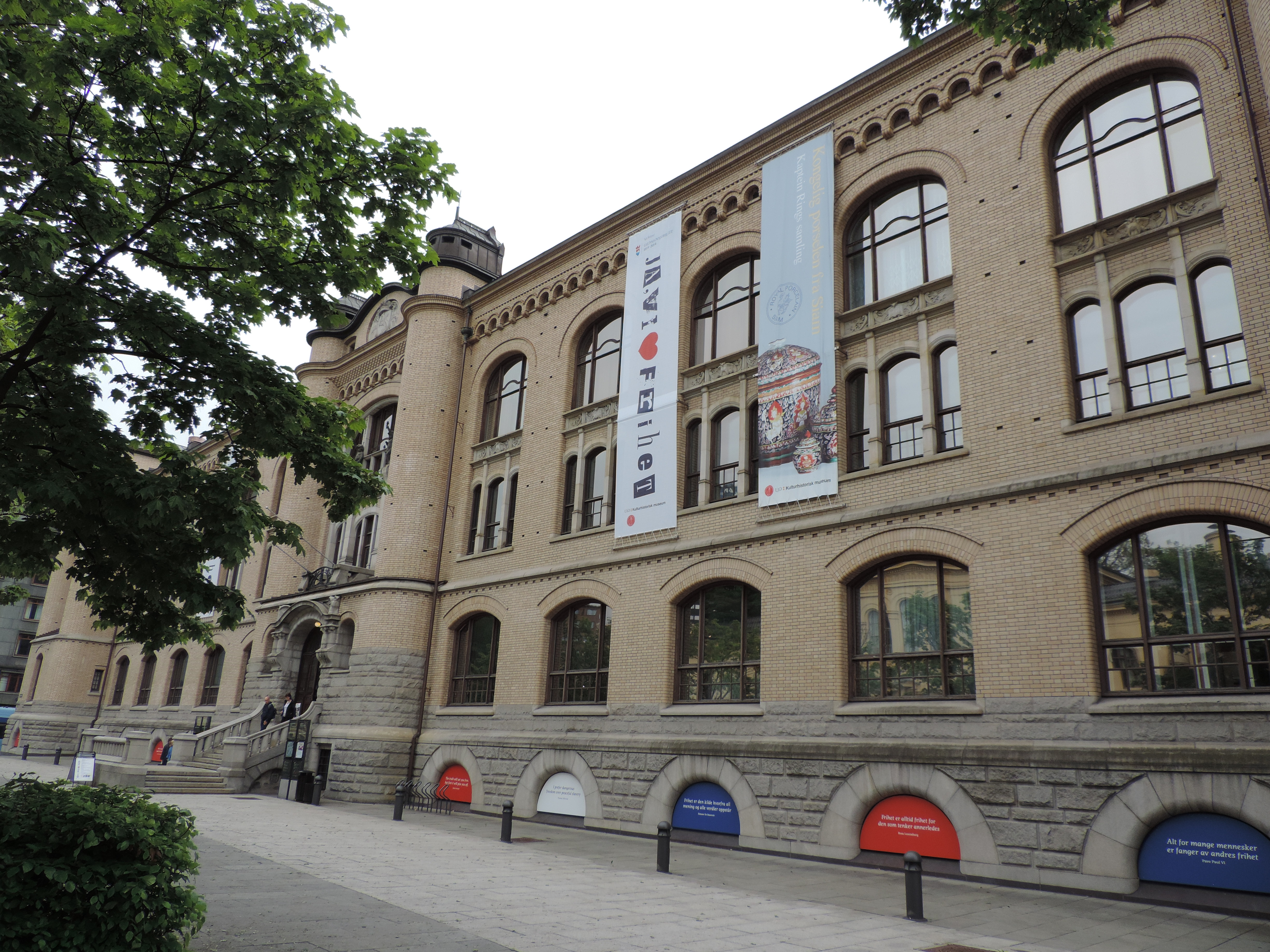
- Museum of Cultural History, Oslo
- Established: 1999
- Location: Oslo, Norway
- Type: Cultural history museum
- Collection size: Prehistoric and medieval archaeology, Viking ships, medieval church objects, rune archive, ethnographic artifacts, historical coins
- Website: Official website

Museum of Cultural History (Norwegian: Kulturhistorisk museum, KHM) is an association of museums subject to the University of Oslo, Norway. KHM was established in 1999 as Universitetets kulturhistoriske museum with the merging of the bodies Universitetets Oldsaksamling which housed a collection of ancient and medieval objects, Viking Ship Museum (Vikingskipshuset) at Bygdøy, the Coin Cabinet (Myntkabinettet) and Ethnographic Museum (Etnografisk samling). In 2004 the name was changed to Kulturhistorisk museum.

The activities of the Museum of Cultural History are currently localized in four main buildings in Oslo city centre: Historical Museum at Frederiks gate 2 and Frederiks gate 3 and administration at St. Olavs gate 29, as well as the Viking Ship Museum on the Bygdøy peninsula.

The Museum of Cultural History is one of Norway's largest cultural history museums. It holds the country's largest prehistoric and medieval archaeological collections, including the Viking ships at Bygdøy, a substantial collection of medieval church objects, and a rune archive. The museum also has a comprehensive ethnographic collection that includes objects from every continent, as well as Norway's largest collection of historical coins.

== Gallery ==
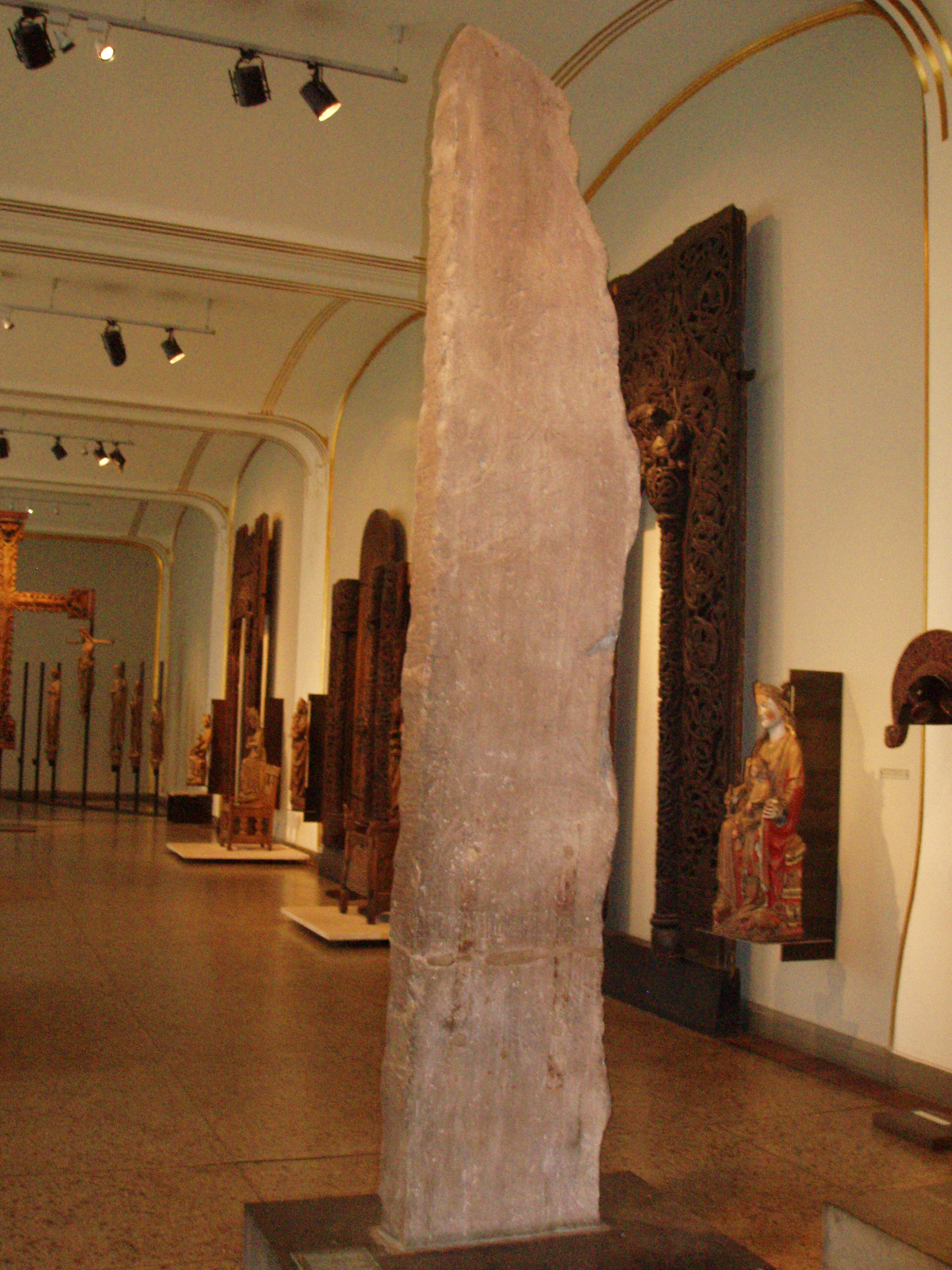
Alstad runestone from Hof in Oppland

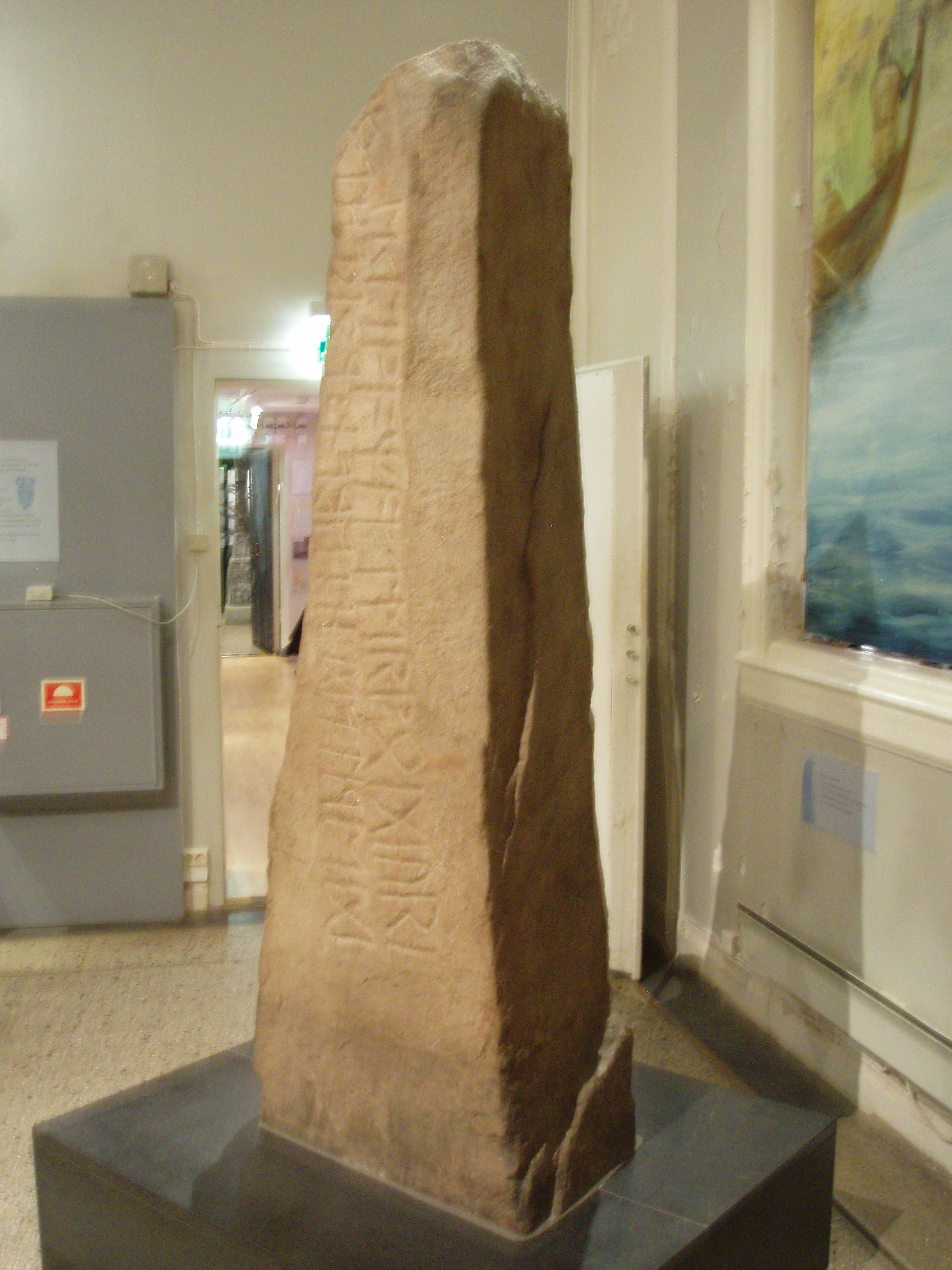
Tune runestone from Tune in Østfold

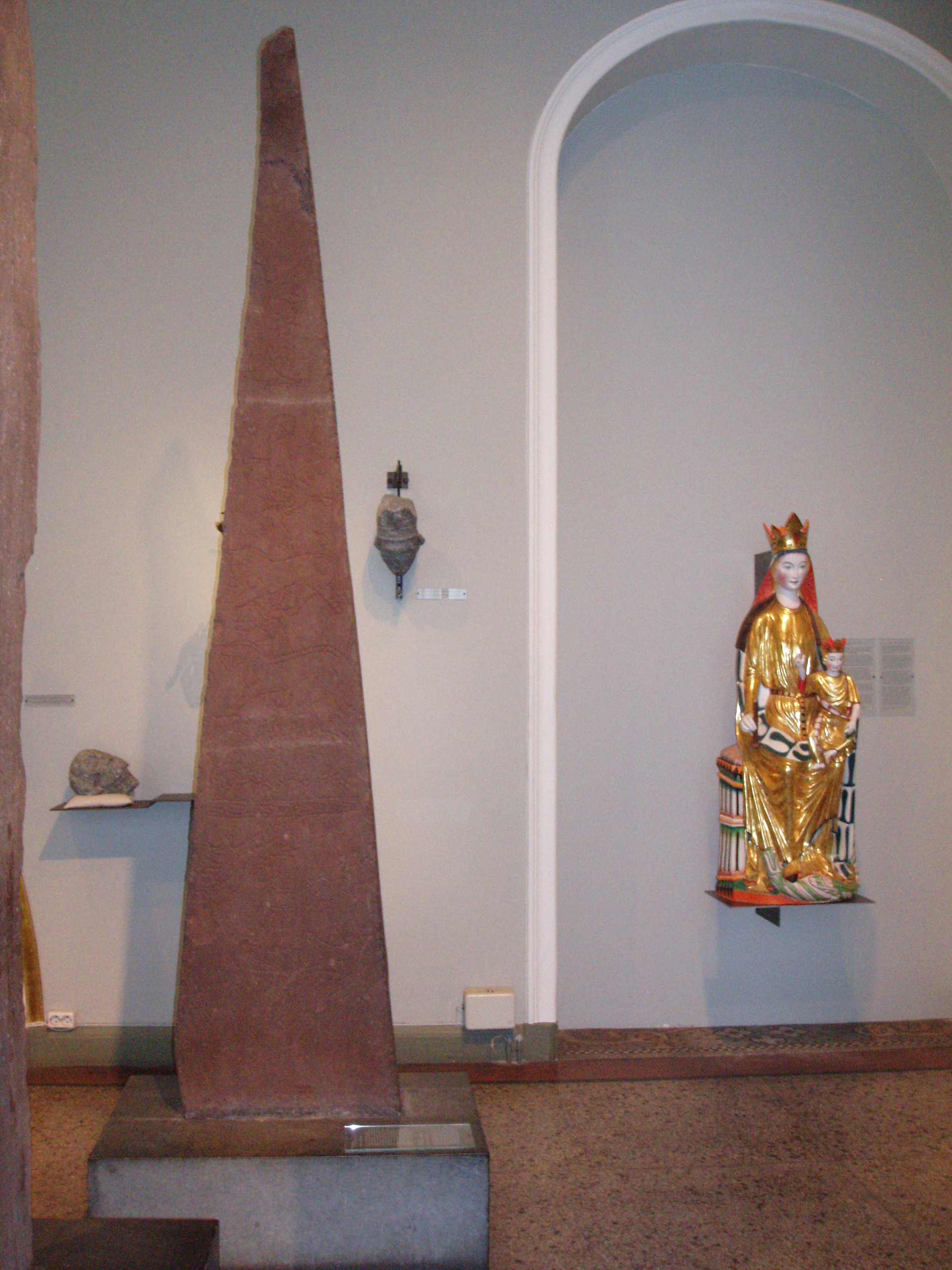
Dynna runestone from Gran in Oppland

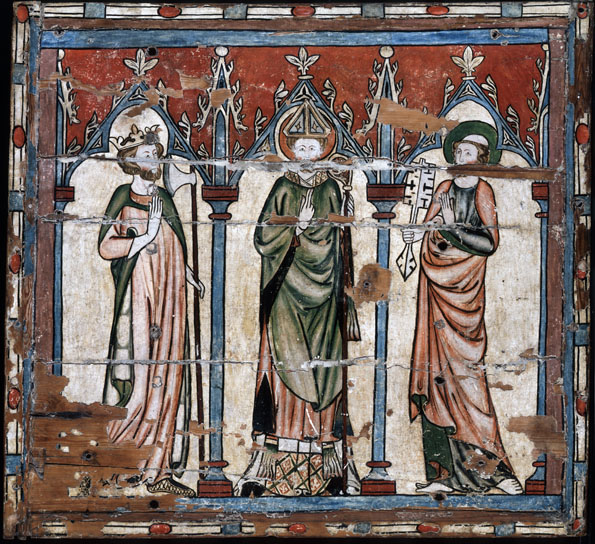
Church altar piece from Kvæfjord in Troms

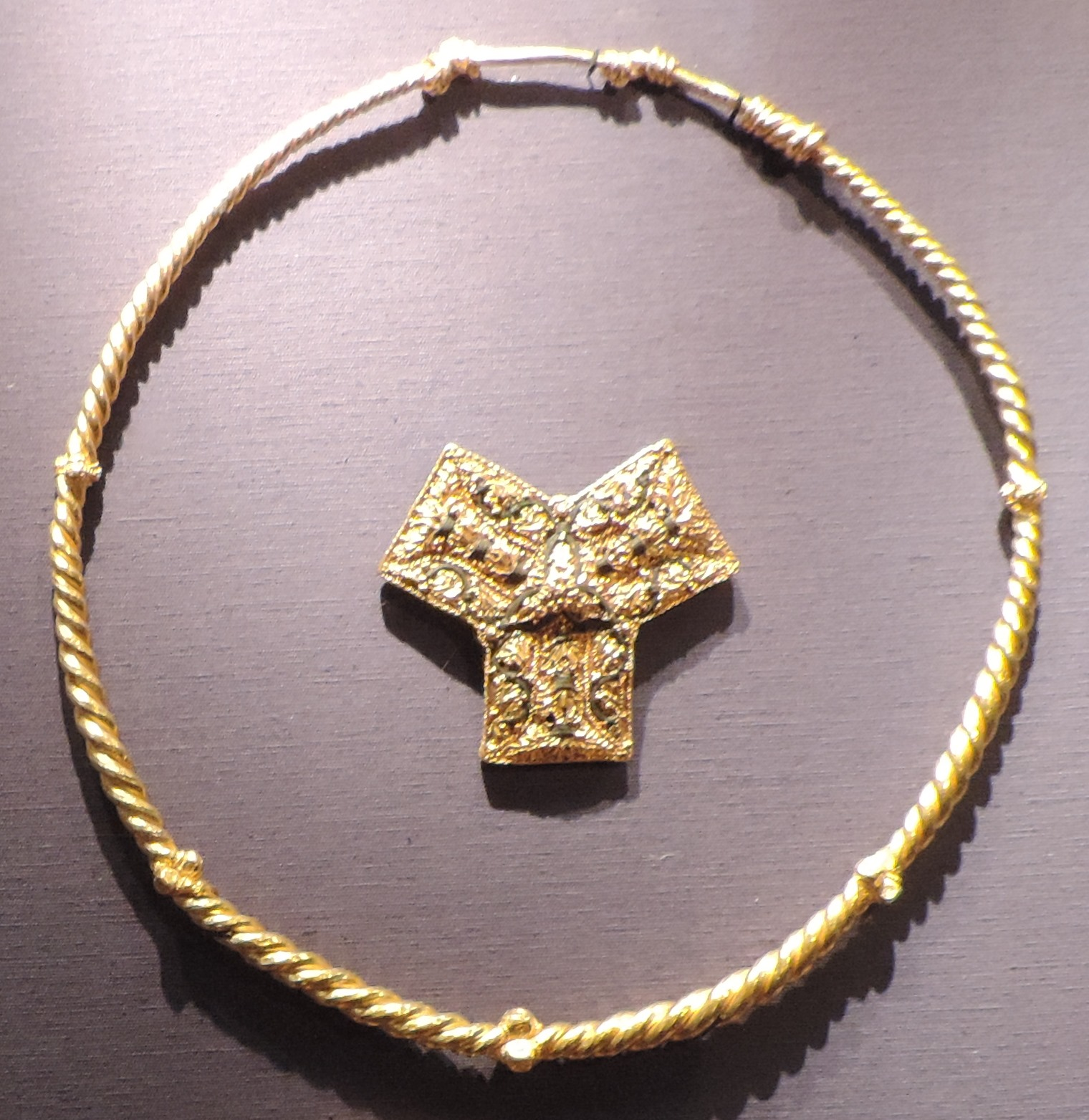
Gold artefacts from the Hoen treasure, Buskerud

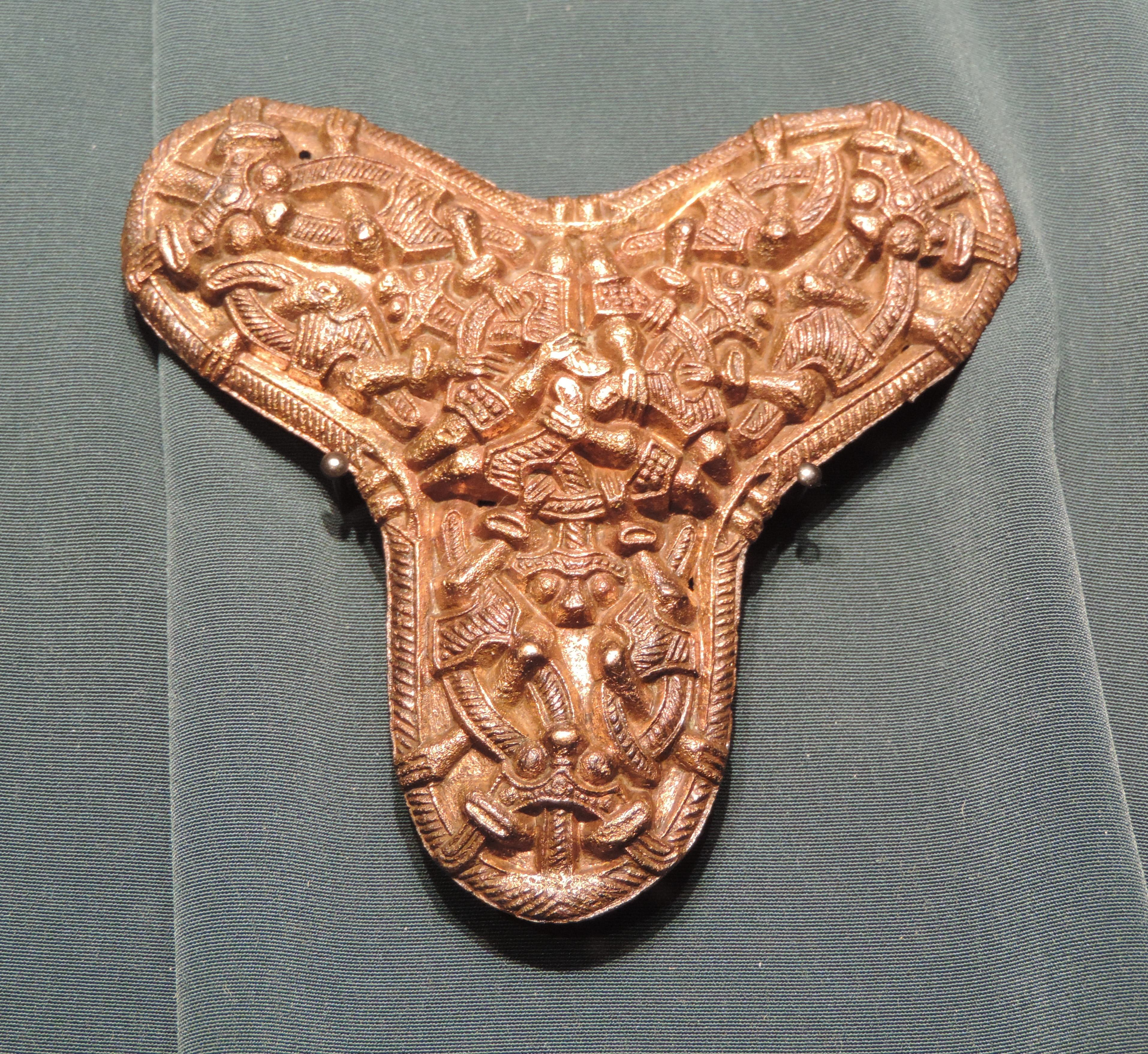
Borre style art from Horten in Vestfold

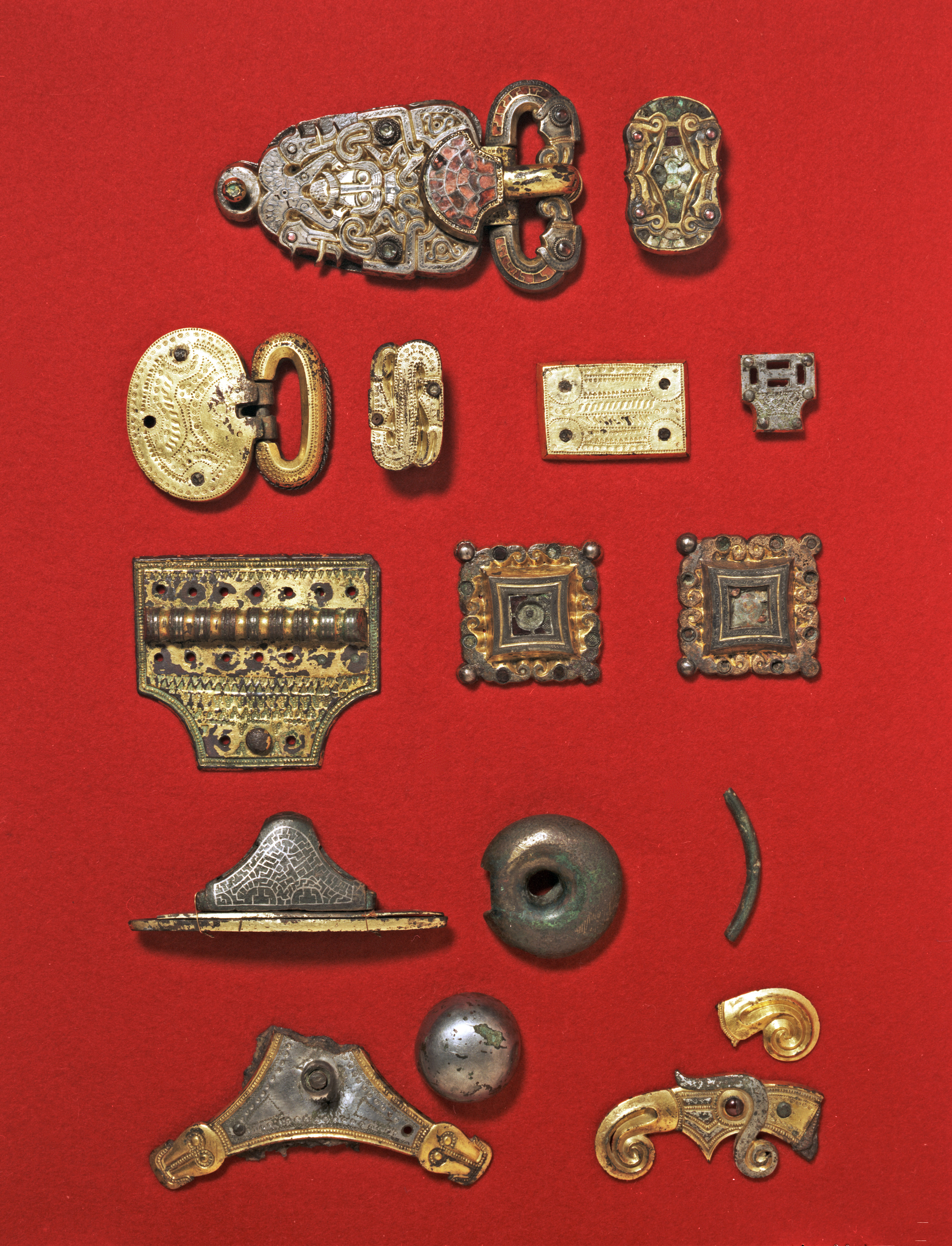
Archaeological find at Åker in Hamar
