= Eiker =

- District
- Map of Eiker with municipalities

- Location within Buskerud Location within Norway
- Coordinates: 59°46′16″N 9°54′30″E
- Country: Norway
- County: Buskerud
- Region: Østlandet

Eiker is a traditional district in the county of Buskerud, Norway.

== History ==
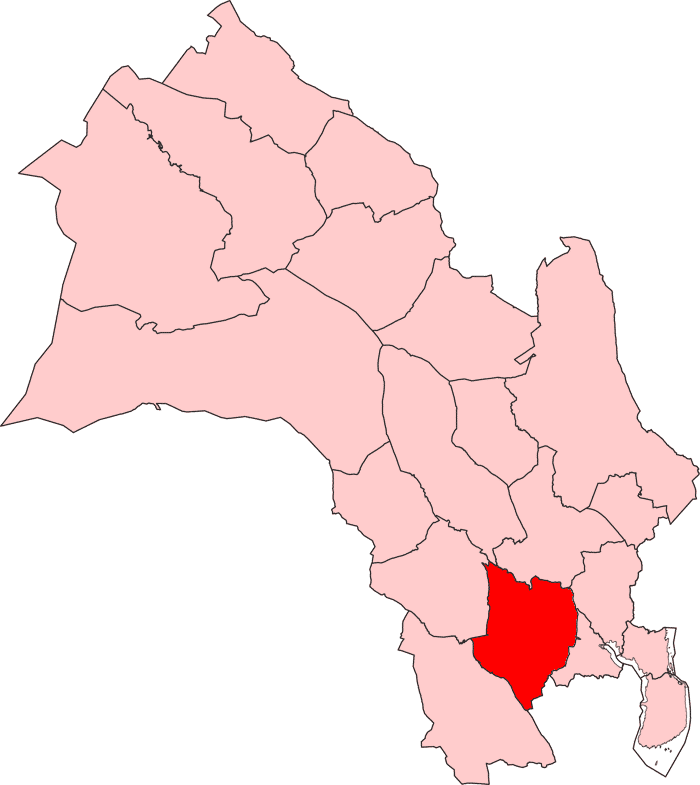
Eiker as a municipality, i.e., pre-1885

Eiker consists of the municipalities of Nedre Eiker and Øvre Eiker. The area is located in the southern part of Buskerud county. Eiker is an agricultural area with a long history. The area was first inhabited around 8000 BC. During the early Viking Age, Eiker was the western extension of the kingdom of Vingulmark. Somewhat later, it became part of the kingdom of Vestfold. The parish of Eker was established as a municipality on 1 January 1838 (see formannskapsdistrikt). It was divided into Nedre Eiker and Øvre Eiker on 1 July 1885.

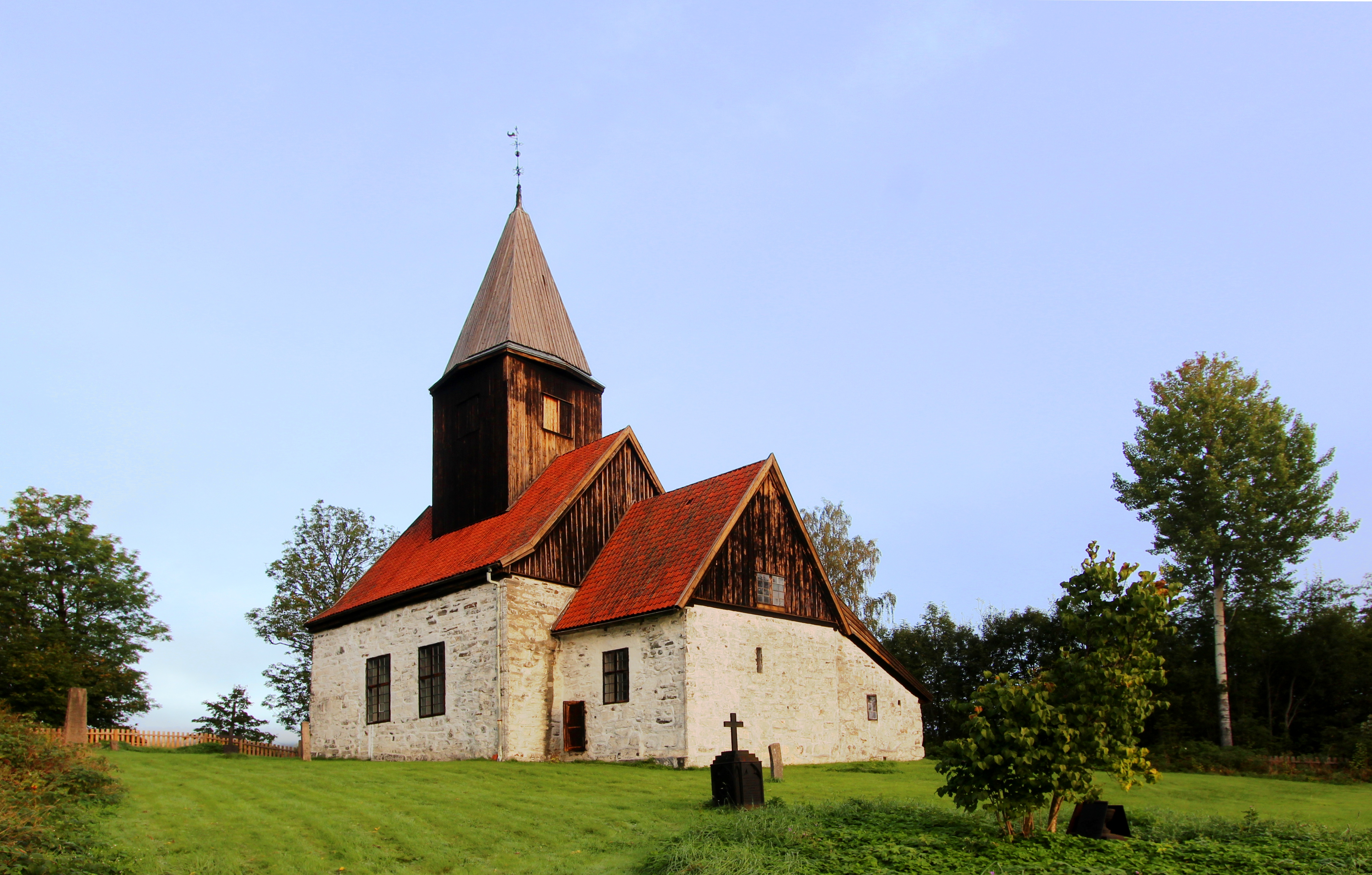
Fiskum gamle kirke is a medieval stone church

== Fiskum Old Church ==
Fiskum Old Church (Fiskum gamle kirke) is located in Øvre Eiker near the village of Darbu. It is a medieval era, Romanesque church dating from approximately 1200 A.D. The church was dedicated to Saint Olav. Fiskum Old Church was constructed in a rectangular shape and has 150 seats. The church was built of stone fracture in lime mortar and plastered inside. After the Protestant Reformation, Fiskum Church came under Haug Church at Haugsbygd. In 1866 the new Fiskum Church was built and the old church no longer had any official function. Externally, the church has preserved much of its medieval appearance. Inside the church reflects an expansion dating from the 17th century.

== Etymology ==
The Old Norse form of the name was Eikjar. The name is the plural form of eik which means oak.

== Other sources ==
- Fiskum Old Church (Ringerike-Drammen District Lag. Volume 24, No.1, February 2010)
