= Vossestrand Municipality =

Former municipality in Hordaland, Norway

Vossestrand Municipality Vossestrand herad
- Former municipality
- Vossestranden herred (historic name)
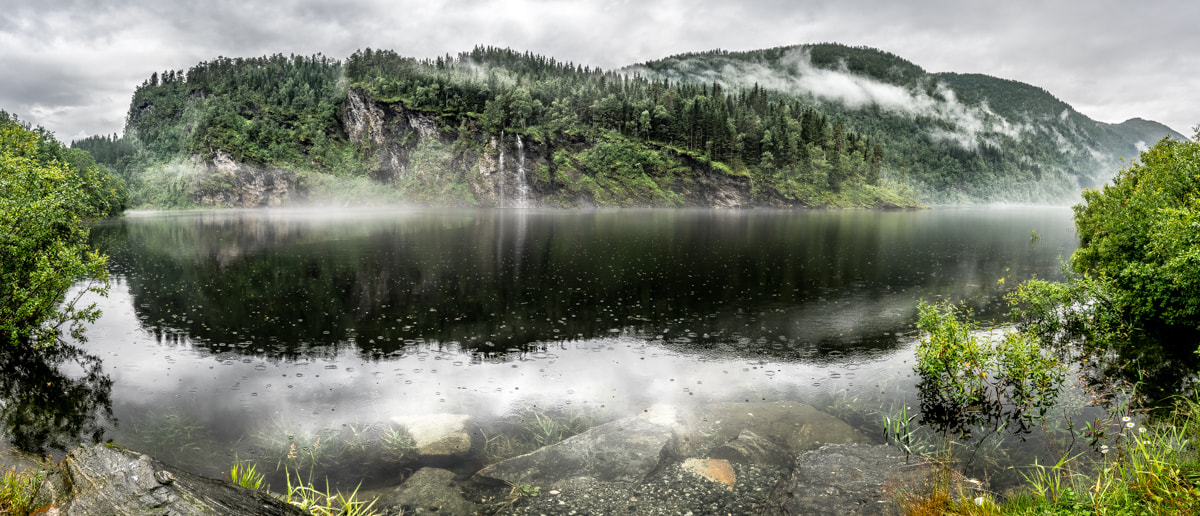
- View of the Myrkdalen valley

- Hordaland within Norway

- Vossestrand within Hordaland
- Coordinates: 60°48′N 06°36′E
- Country: Norway
- County: Hordaland
- District: Voss
- Established: 1 Jan 1868
  - Preceded by: Voss Municipality
- Disestablished: 1 Jan 1964
  - Succeeded by: Voss Municipality
- Administrative centre: Oppheim

Government
  - Mayor (1960–1963): Per Årmot (Sp)

Area (upon dissolution)
  - Total: 536.2 km^{2} (207.0 sq mi)
  - Rank: #187 in Norway
- Highest elevation: 1,548 m (5,079 ft)

Population (1963)
  - Total: 1,576
  - Rank: #527 in Norway
  - Density: 2.9/km^{2} (7.5/sq mi)
  - Change (10 years): ▼ −4.8%

Official language
  - Norwegian form: Nynorsk
- Time zone: UTC+01:00 (CET)
  - Summer (DST): UTC+02:00 (CEST)
- ISO 3166 code: NO-1236

Vossestrand is a former municipality in the old Hordaland county, Norway. The 536.2-square-kilometre (207.0 sq mi) municipality existed from 1868 until its dissolution in 1964. The area is now part of Voss Municipality in the traditional district of Voss in Vestland county. The administrative centre was the village of Oppheim. Other villages in the municipality included Stalheim, Vinje, and Myrkdalen.

Prior to its dissolution in 1964, the 536.2-square-kilometre (207.0 sq mi) municipality was the 187th largest by area out of the 689 municipalities in Norway. Vossestrand Municipality was the 527th most populous municipality in Norway with a population of about 1,576. The municipality's population density was 2.9 inhabitants per square kilometre (7.5/sq mi) and its population had decreased by 4.8% over the previous 10-year period.

== General information ==
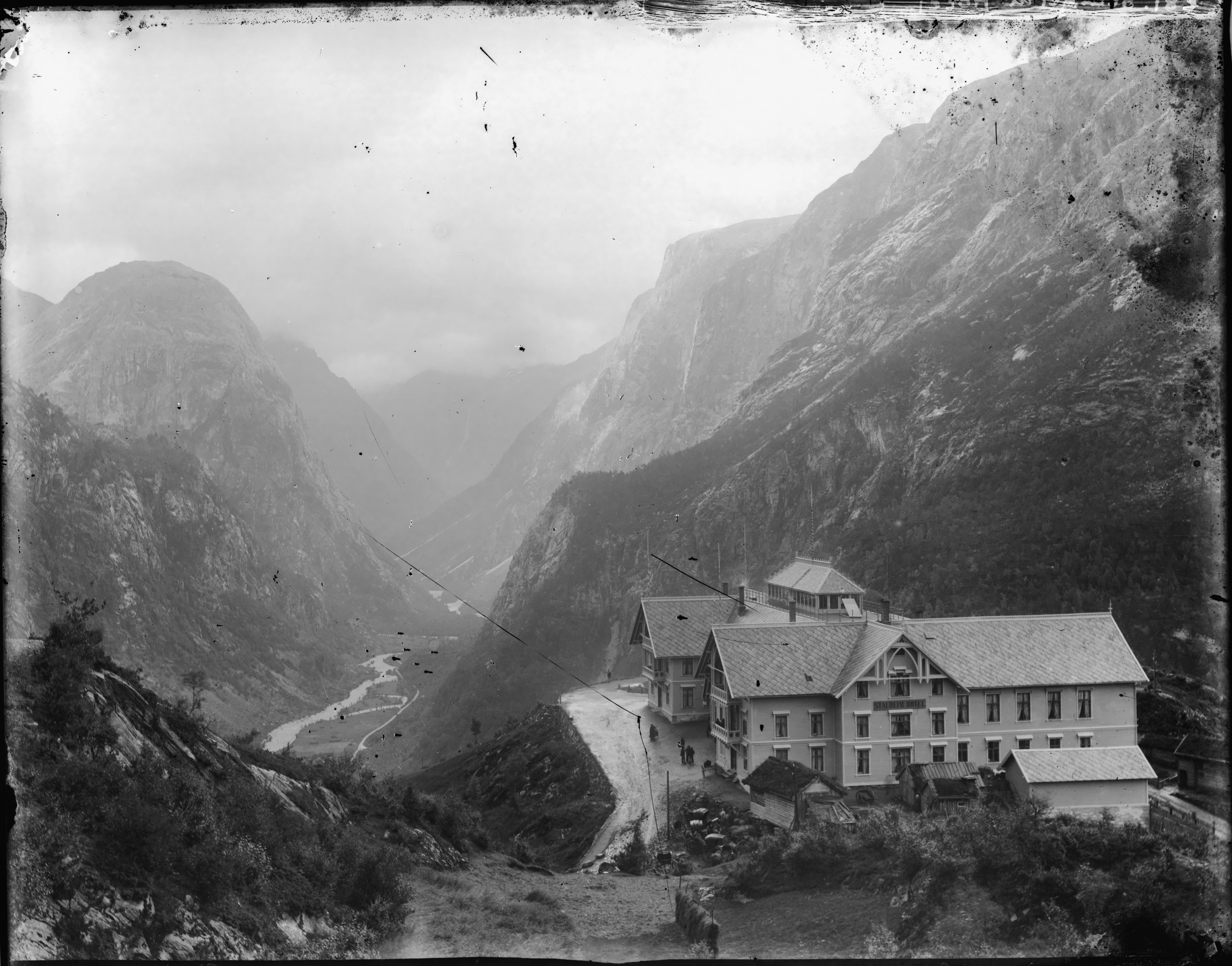
Hotel Stalheim in Vossestrand

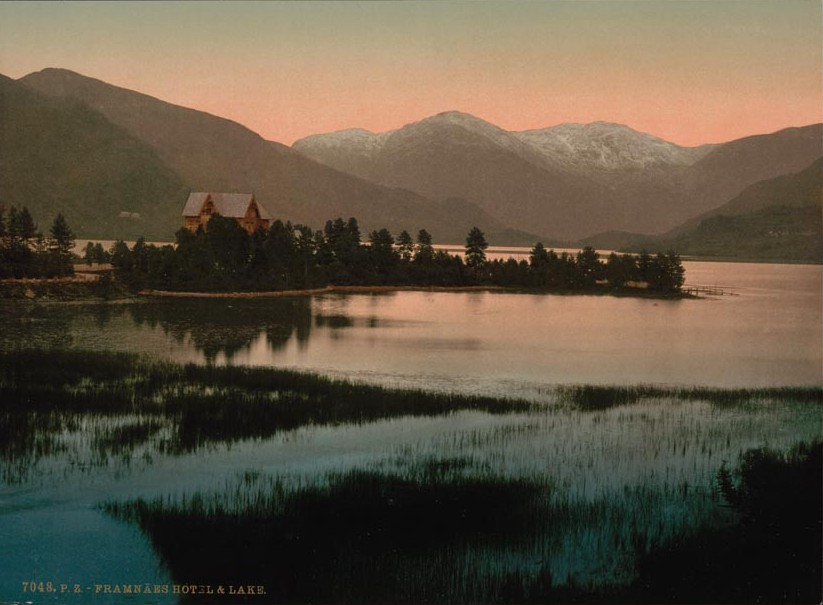
Framnes Hotel and the Oppheimsvatnet lake

The municipality of Vossestrand was created on 1 January 1868 when the old (large) Voss Municipality was divided into two separate municipalities. The northern part (population: 2,009) became Vossestrand Municipality and the southern part (population: 7,592) remained as a smaller Voss Municipality. On 21 August 1869, an unpopulated area of Voss Municipality was administratively transferred to Vossestrand Municipality.

During the 1960s, there were many municipal mergers across Norway due to the work of the Schei Committee. On 1 January 1964, the following areas were merged to form a new, larger Voss Municipality:

- all of Voss Municipality (population: 10,575)
- all of Vossestrand Municipality (population: 1,573)
- part of Evanger Municipality (population: 1,075), everything except for the Bergsdalen and Eksingedalen areas which became part of Vaksdal Municipality

=== Name ===
The municipality is named after an old name for the area, Strand (Old Norse: Strǫnd). The name Vossestrand was created in the 1860s when the municipality was established. The first element is named after the traditional district of Voss (Old Norse: Vǫrs). That name is likely derived from the word vǫrr which means "water" (likely the old district name was originally used as the name for the lake Vangsvatnet. The last element is derived strǫnd which means "beach" or "shore".

Historically, the name of the municipality was spelled Vossestranden. On 3 November 1917, a royal resolution changed the spelling of the name of the municipality to Vossestrand, removing the definite form ending -en.

=== Churches ===
The Church of Norway had two parishes (sokn) within Vossestrand Municipality. At the time of the municipal dissolution, it was part of the Vossestrand prestegjeld and the Hardanger og Voss prosti (deanery) in the Diocese of Bjørgvin.

Churches in Vossestrand Municipality
Parish (sokn)	Church name	Location of the church	Year built
Oppheim	Oppheim Church	Oppheim	1871
Vinje	Vinje Church	Vinje	1871

== Geography ==
The highest point in the municipality was the 1,548-metre (5,079 ft) tall mountain Blåfjellet, located on the northern border with Vik Municipality. The large lake Oppheimsvatnet sat in the central part of the municipality. Vik Municipality (in Sogn og Fjordane county) was located to the north, Aurland Municipality (also in Sogn og Fjordane county) was located to the northeast, Voss Municipality was located to the east and south, and Evanger Municipality was located to the west.

== Government ==
While it existed, Vossestrand Municipality was responsible for primary education (through 10th grade), outpatient health services, senior citizen services, welfare and other social services, zoning, economic development, and municipal roads and utilities. The municipality was governed by a municipal council of directly elected representatives. The mayor was indirectly elected by a vote of the municipal council. The municipality was under the jurisdiction of the Gulating Court of Appeal.

=== Municipal council ===
The municipal council (Heradsstyre) of Vossestrand Municipality was made up of 17 representatives that were elected to four year terms. The tables below show the historical composition of the council by political party.

Vossestrand heradsstyre 1959–1963
Party name (in Nynorsk)	Number of representatives
Labour Party (Arbeidarpartiet)	3
Conservative Party (Høgre)	1
Centre Party (Senterpartiet)	11
Local List(s) (Lokale lister)	2
Total number of members:	17
Note: On 1 January 1964, Vossestrand Municipality became part of Voss Municipality.

Vossestrand heradsstyre 1955–1959
Party name (in Nynorsk)	Number of representatives
Labour Party (Arbeidarpartiet)	4
Conservative Party (Høgre)	1
Farmers' Party (Bondepartiet)	12
Total number of members:	17

Vossestrand heradsstyre 1951–1955
Party name (in Nynorsk)	Number of representatives
Labour Party (Arbeidarpartiet)	2
Conservative Party (Høgre)	1
Farmers' Party (Bondepartiet)	11
Liberal Party (Venstre)	2
Total number of members:	16

Vossestrand heradsstyre 1947–1951
Party name (in Nynorsk)	Number of representatives
Conservative Party (Høgre)	1
Christian Democratic Party (Kristeleg Folkeparti)	3
Farmers' Party (Bondepartiet)	9
Liberal Party (Venstre)	2
List of workers, fishermen, and small farmholders (Arbeidarar, fiskarar, småbrukarar liste)	1
Total number of members:	16

Vossestrand heradsstyre 1945–1947
Party name (in Nynorsk)	Number of representatives
Christian Democratic Party (Kristeleg Folkeparti)	3
Farmers' Party (Bondepartiet)	9
Liberal Party (Venstre)	1
List of workers, fishermen, and small farmholders (Arbeidarar, fiskarar, småbrukarar liste)	2
Local List(s) (Lokale lister)	1
Total number of members:	16

Vossestrand heradsstyre 1937–1941*
Party name (in Nynorsk)	Number of representatives
Labour Party (Arbeidarpartiet)	4
Farmers' Party (Bondepartiet)	9
Liberal Party (Venstre)	2
Local List(s) (Lokale lister)	1
Total number of members:	16
Note: Due to the German occupation of Norway during World War II, no elections were held for new municipal councils until after the war ended in 1945.

=== Mayors ===
The mayor (Nynorsk: ordførar) of Vossestrand Municipality was the political leader of the municipality and the chairperson of the municipal council. The following people have held this position:

- 1868–1871: Christian Johannes Hammer
- 1871–1880: Torstein Hellesnes
- 1881–1910: Olav Brekke (MV)
- 1911–1918: Eirik T. Hellesnes (V)
- 1919–1925: Torstein Skjervheim (Bp)
- 1926–1934: Sjur Bygd (Bp)
- 1935–1941: Odd Hole Høen (Bp)
- 1942–1945: Lars Rygg (NS)
- 1945–1947: Odd Hole Høen (Bp)
- 1948–1959: Lars A. Hauge (Bp)
- 1960–1963: Per Årmot (Sp)

== See also ==
- List of former municipalities of Norway
