= Oppheim =

Village in Voss Municipality, Norway

- Village
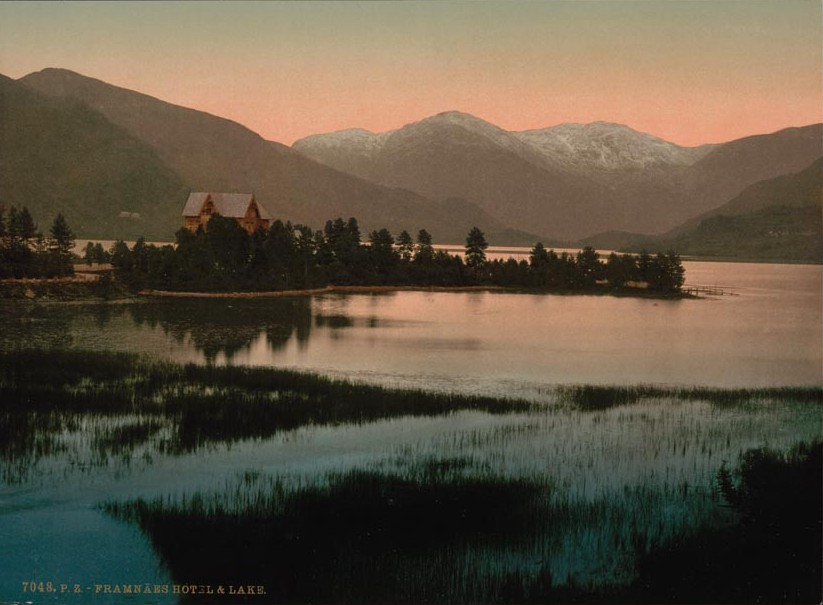
- View of the Framnes Hotel in Oppheim
- Interactive map of the village
- Coordinates: 60.79424°N 6.57455°E
- Country: Norway
- Region: Western Norway
- County: Vestland
- District: Voss
- Municipality: Voss Municipality
- Elevation: 336 m (1,102 ft)
- Time zone: UTC+01:00 (CET)
  - Summer (DST): UTC+02:00 (CEST)
- Post Code: 5713 Vossestrand

Oppheim is a village in Voss Municipality in Vestland county, Norway. The village is located along the western shore of the lake Oppheimsvatnet, between the mountains surrounding the lake and the lakeshore. The southern shore of the lake is the site of the small village of Vasstrondi.

The European route E16 highway passes through the village on its way from Vinje to Stalheim. The historic Framnæs Hotel is located at the west end of the lake in the village.

== History ==
Oppheim Church has been located in the village for centuries. The old Vossestrand Municipality existed from 1868 until 1964. The administrative centre of the municipality was the village of Oppheim.
