= Voss Municipality =

Municipality in Vestland, Norway

Voss Municipality Voss herad
- Municipality
- Voss kommune (historic name)
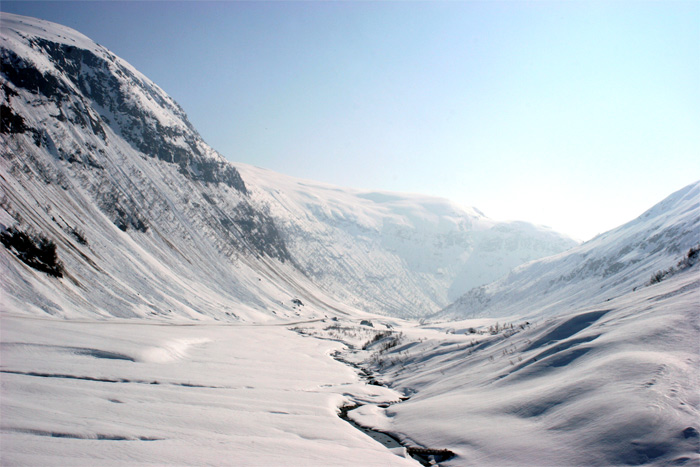
- Voss in March 2005

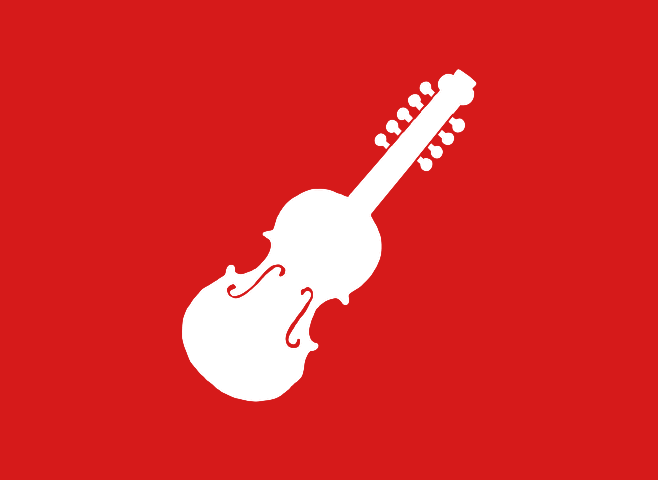
- Flag Coat of arms

- Vestland within Norway

- Voss within Vestland
- Coordinates: 60°42′09″N 06°25′23″E
- Country: Norway
- County: Vestland
- District: Voss
- Established: 1 Jan 1838
  - Created as: Formannskapsdistrikt
- Administrative centre: Vossavangen

Government
  - Mayor (2023): Tonje Såkvitne (Sp)

Area
  - Total: 2,041.96 km^{2} (788.41 sq mi)
  - Land: 1,957.71 km^{2} (755.88 sq mi)
  - Water: 84.25 km^{2} (32.53 sq mi) 4.1%
  - Rank: #35 in Norway
- Highest elevation: 1,575.92 m (5,170.3 ft)

Population (2025)
  - Total: 16,436
  - Rank: #77 in Norway
  - Density: 8/km^{2} (21/sq mi)
  - Change (10 years): ▲ +9.2%
- Demonym(s): Vossing; Voss (male); Vosse (female)

Official language
  - Norwegian form: Nynorsk
- Time zone: UTC+01:00 (CET)
  - Summer (DST): UTC+02:00 (CEST)
- ISO 3166 code: NO-4621
- Website: Official website

Voss is a municipality in Vestland county, Norway. The municipality is located in the traditional district of Voss. The administrative center of the municipality is the village of Vossavangen. Other villages include Bolstadøyri, Borstrondi, Djønno, Evanger, Granvin, Kvitheim, Klyve, Kvitheim, Kyte, Mjølfjell, Nordheim, Oppheim, Stalheim, Vinje, and Ygre.

The 2,042-square-kilometre (788 sq mi) municipality is the 35th largest by area of Norway's 357 municipalities. Voss Municipality is Norway's 77th most populous municipality, with a population of 16,436. Its population density is 8 inhabitants per square kilometre (21/sq mi) and its population has increased by 9.2% over the previous ten-year period.

== Municipal history ==
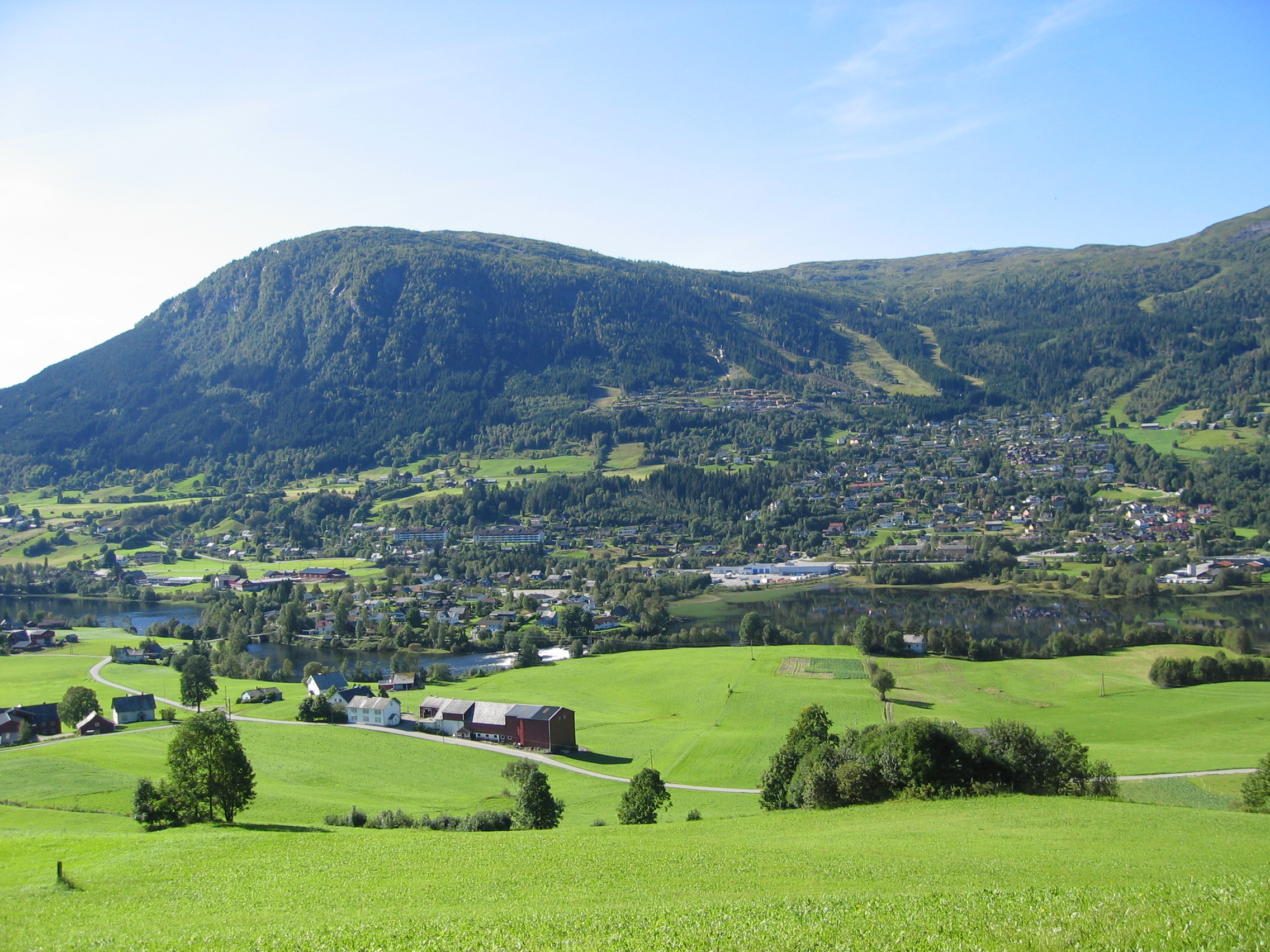
View of the Skulestadmo area

The parish of Voss was established as a municipality on 1 January 1838 (see formannskapsdistrikt law). On 1 January 1867, a small area in northern Voss (population 28) was transferred to Hosanger Municipality. On 1 January 1868, Voss Municipality was divided: the northern district (population 2,009) became the new Vossestrand Municipality and the southern district (population: 7,592) continued on as a smaller Voss Municipality. On 21 August 1868, an unpopulated area of northern Voss Municipality was transferred to Vossestrand Municipality. On 1 January 1885, Voss Municipality was divided again: the western district (population 2,045) became the new Evanger Municipality and the eastern district (population: 5,403) remained as a smaller Voss Municipality.

During the 1960s, there were many municipal mergers across Norway due to the work of the Schei Committee. On 1 January 1964, the following areas were merged to form a new, larger Voss Municipality:

- all of Voss Municipality (population: 10,575)
- all of Vossestrand Municipality (population: 1,573)
- part of Evanger Municipality (population: 1,075), everything except for the Bergsdalen and Eksingedalen areas which became part of Vaksdal Municipality

Historically, this municipality was part of the old Hordaland county. On 1 January 2020, the municipality became a part of the newly-formed Vestland county (after Hordaland and Sogn og Fjordane counties were merged). Also on 1 January 2020, the neighboring Granvin Municipality merged with Voss Municipality, creating a larger Voss municipality. Before the merger, it was known as Voss kommune, but afterward it was called Voss herad, using the title herad which Granvin Municipality formerly had used.

=== Name ===
The municipality (originally the parish) is named after the traditional district of Voss (Old Norse: Vǫrs). The name is likely derived from the word vǫrr which means "water" (likely the old district name was originally used as the name for the lake Vangsvatnet.

Voss Municipality (Norwegian: Voss herad) is one of only three municipalities in Norway that uses the word herad instead of kommune in its name. Both Norwegian words can be translated to be "municipality", but herad is an older word that historically was only used for rural municipalities. Municipalities can choose to use one or the other, but most use the more modern kommune. From 1838 until the mid-20th century, most municipalities used herad or herred (using the Nynorsk or Bokmål spelling) for their name, but after some legal changes in the law on municipalities in the 1950s and onwards, most municipalities switched to kommune. The only other municipalities to use herad in 2026 are Kvam Municipality and Ulvik Municipality. There are also a few municipalities with herad in the name such as Kvinnherad Municipality.

=== Coat of arms ===
Arms from 1977 to 2019

Current arms since 2020

The original coat of arms was granted on 8 July 1977 and was in use until 1 January 2020, when the municipality was enlarged. The official blazon is "Gules, a deer stag argent" (Norwegian: På raud grunn ein opprett kvit hjort). This means the arms have a red field (background) and the charge is a deer stag with antlers. The charge has a tincture of argent which means it is commonly colored white, but if it is made out of metal, then silver is used. The arms are based on the seal of Peter, who was the owner of the farm Finne in Voss, one of the largest farms in Western Norway during the Middle Ages. He used a silver deer on a red background as his personal coat of arms in 1303. His son also used a deer on his seals, as did most of their relatives until 1460. The shape and position of the deer varied, but it always was the main figure. The arms were designed by Hallvard Trætteberg. The municipal flag was nearly the same design as the coat of arms, the main difference was the placement of the deer legs.

A new coat of arms was granted in 2019 for use starting on 1 January 2020 after the merger of Voss Municipality and Granvin Municipality. The decision was made to blend the old municipalities' previous arms, so the design from Granvin and the colors from Voss were chosen for the new arms. The official blazon is "Gules, a fiddle argent in bend sinister" (Norwegian: På raud grunn ei sølv fele, skråstilt venstre-høgre). This means the arms have a red field (background) and the charge is a hardanger fiddle (Norwegian: Hardingfele), a Norwegian folk instrument. The fiddle has a tincture of argent. The area has an active folk-music tradition. The arms were designed by Øyvind Kvamme. The municipal flag has the same design as the coat of arms.

=== Churches ===
The Church of Norway has seven parishes (sokn) in Voss Municipality. It is part of the Hardanger og Voss prosti (deanery) in the Diocese of Bjørgvin.

Churches in Voss Municipality
Parish (sokn)	Church name	Location	Year built
Evanger	Evanger Church	Evanger	1851
Granvin	Granvin Church	Granvin	1726
Oppheim	Oppheim Church	Oppheim	1871
Raundalen	Raundalen Church	Raundalen	1921
Vinje	Vinje Church	Vinje	1871
Voss	Voss Church	Vossevangen	1277

== History ==
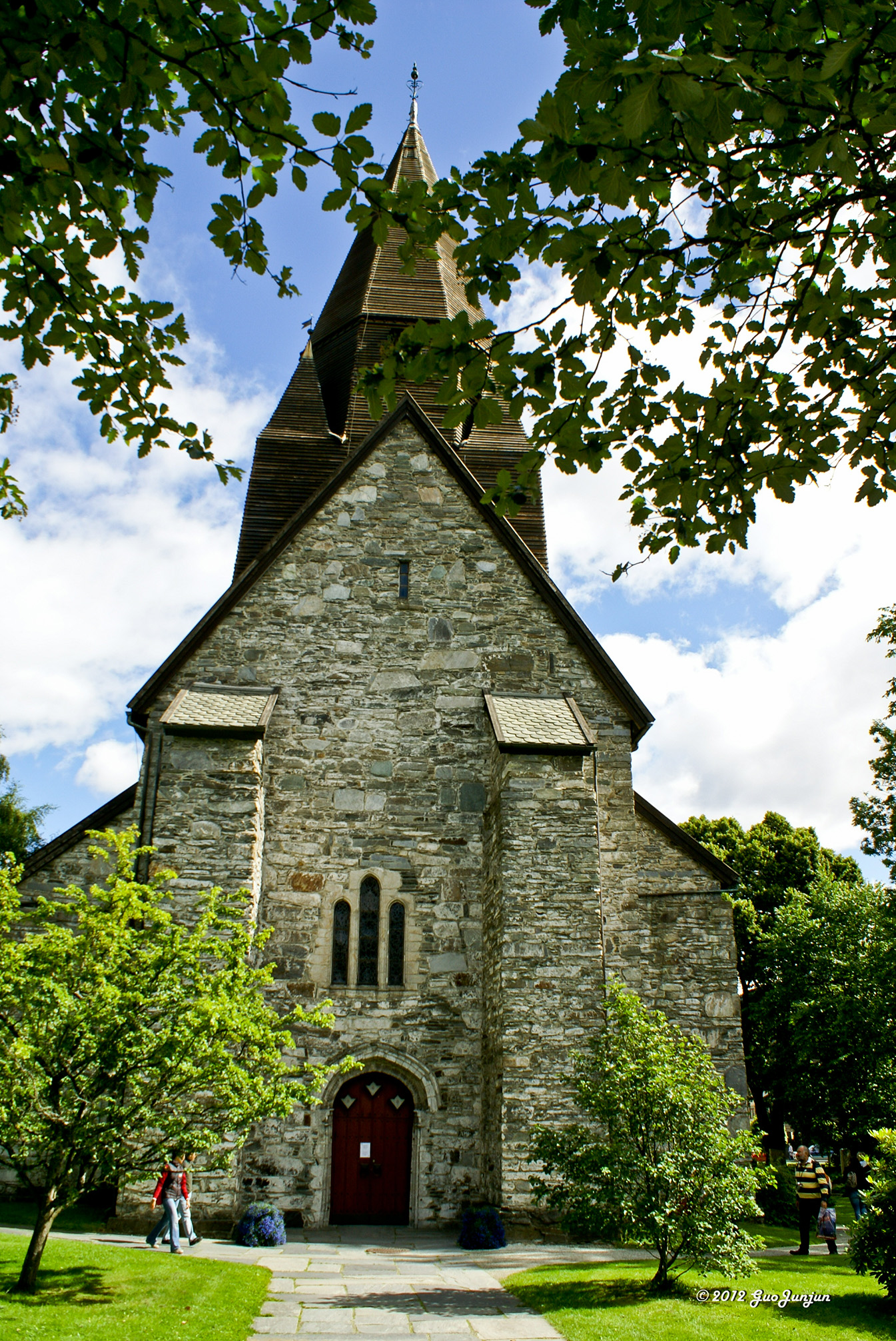
View of Voss Church

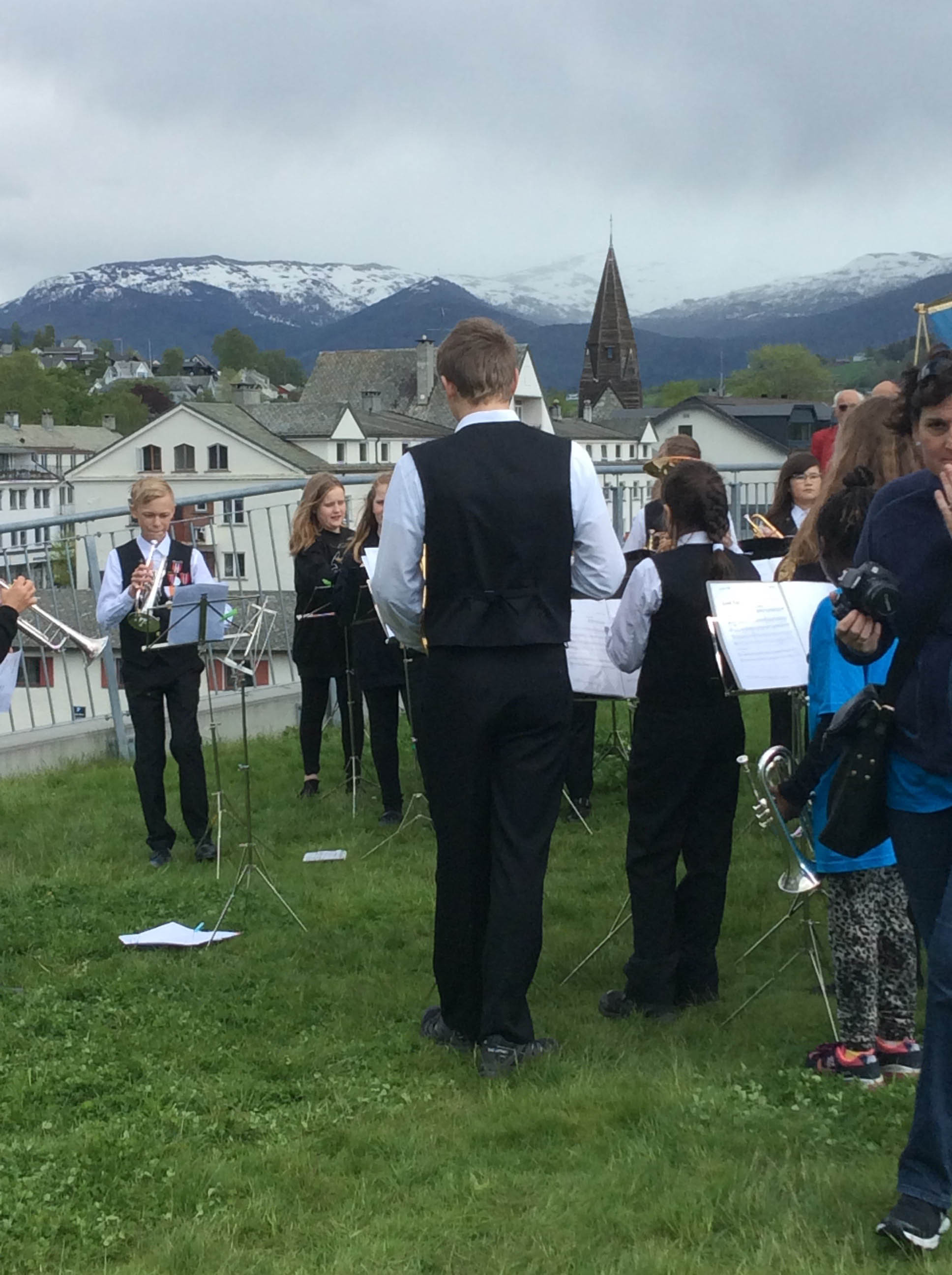
Local youth perform at the Voss Kulturhus

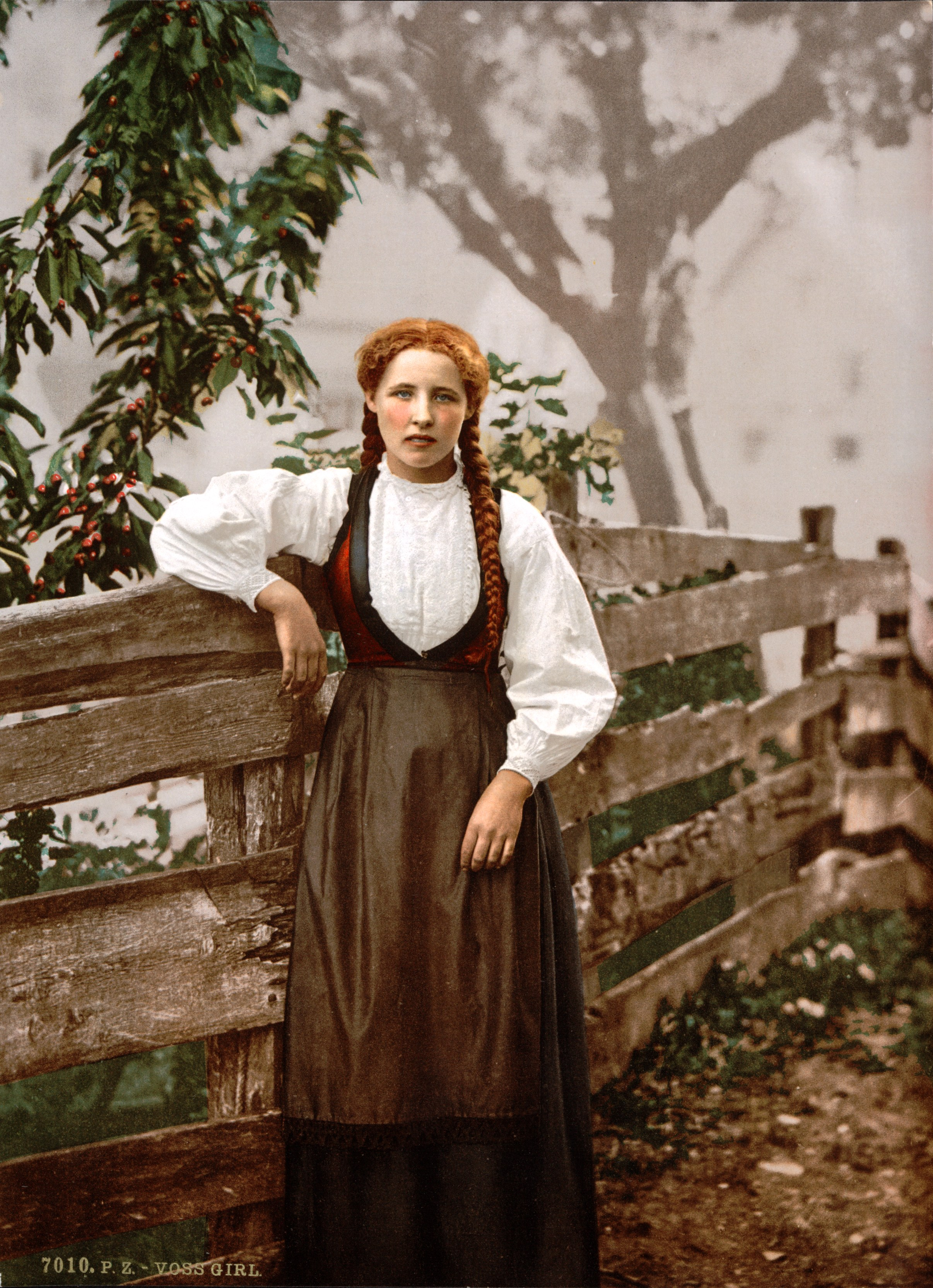
A girl of Voss, c. 1900

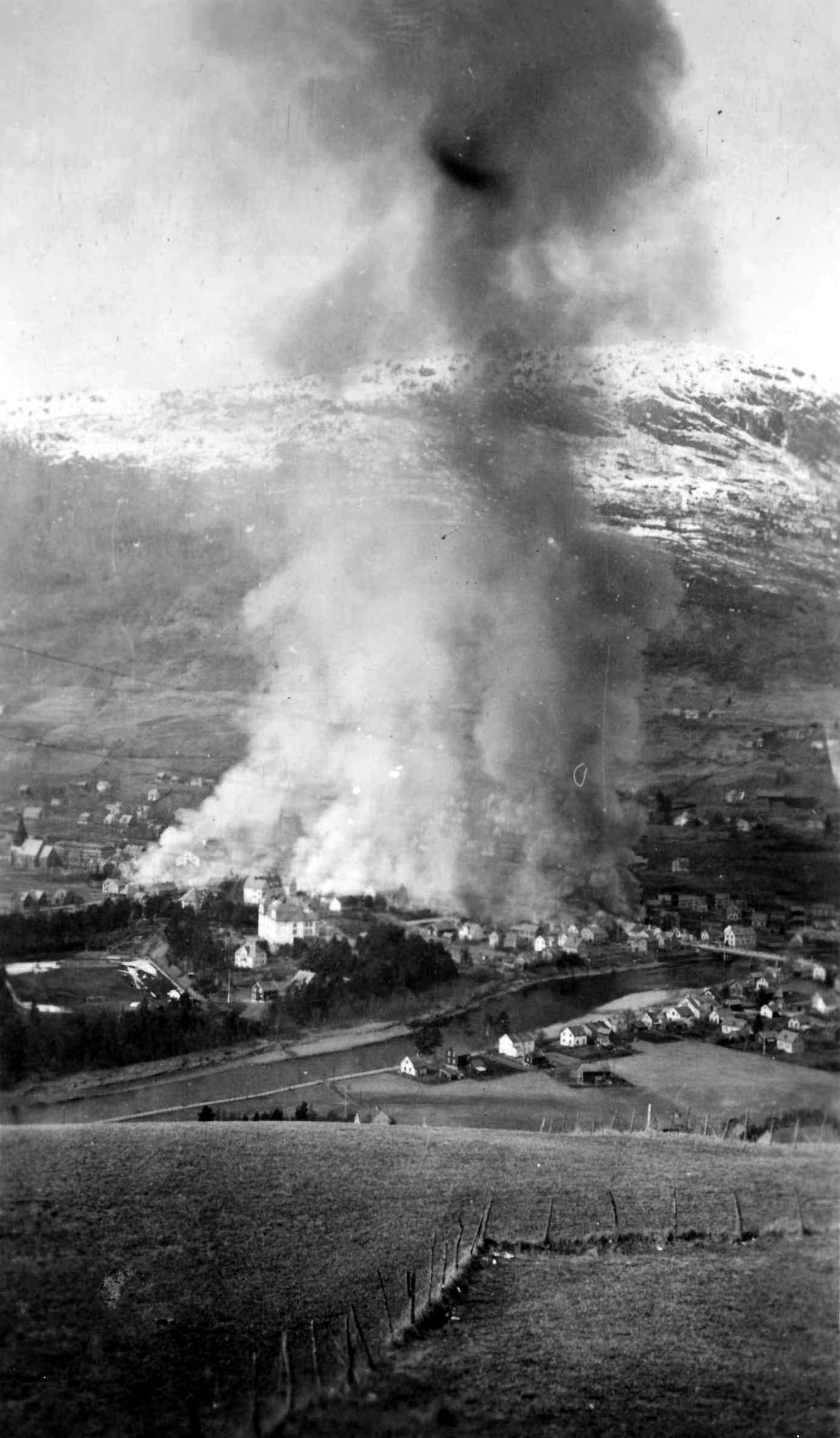
Fire in Voss after April 1940 bombing (Voss church is at far left)

After the German invasion of Norway on 9 April 1940, Voss was the main point of mobilisation for the Norwegian Army in the west, since the city of Bergen had already fallen on 9 April. From Bergen and the Hardangerfjord, the Nazis met stiff Norwegian resistance. In Hardanger, some of the Germans climbed up the mountains from Ålvik; the rest went through Granvin. To break down this resistance, the Luftwaffe bombed Vossevangen on 23 and 24 April, and the surrounding countryside on 25 April. Nine people died in the bombing, which completely destroyed the old wood-built town centre. German forces entered the municipality of Voss on 25 April and on 26 April, German forces entered Vossevangen, which remained occupied until 8 May 1945.

In 1964, Voss Municipality was enlarged with the incorporation of the neighbouring Vossestrand Municipality and Evanger Municipality, which had until then been separate municipalities within the traditional district also known as Voss.

== Population ==
Historical population

Year	Pop.	±% p.a.
1845	8,954	—
1855	9,127	+0.19%
1865	9,631	+0.54%
1875	5,492	−5.46%
1891	6,392	+0.95%
1900	8,015	+2.55%
1910	8,226	+0.26%

Year	Pop.	±% p.a.
1920	8,331	+0.13%
1930	8,448	+0.14%
1946	9,106	+0.47%
1951	9,433	+0.71%
1960	10,275	+0.95%
1970	13,765	+2.97%
1980	14,163	+0.29%

Year	Pop.	±% p.a.
1990	14,035	−0.09%
2000	13,726	−0.22%
2010	13,902	+0.13%
2020	15,740	+1.25%
2023	16,144	+0.85%

Note: The municipal borders were changed in 1868, 1885, 1964, and 2020, all of which caused a significant change in the population.
Source: Statistics Norway and Norwegian Historical Data Centre

== Government ==
Voss Municipality is responsible for primary education (through 10th grade), outpatient health services, senior citizen services, welfare and other social services, zoning, economic development, and municipal roads and utilities. The municipality is governed by a municipal council of directly elected representatives. The mayor is indirectly elected by a vote of the municipal council. The municipality is under the jurisdiction of the Hordaland District Court and the Gulating Court of Appeal.

=== Municipal council ===
The municipal council (Heradsstyre) of Voss Municipality is made up of 43 representatives that are elected to four-year terms. The tables below show the current and historical composition of the council by political party.

Voss heradsstyre 2023–2027
Party name (in Nynorsk)	Number of representatives
Labour Party (Arbeidarpartiet)	8
Progress Party (Framstegspartiet)	2
Green Party (Miljøpartiet Dei Grøne)	1
Conservative Party (Høgre)	9
Industry and Business Party (Industri‑ og Næringspartiet)	5
Christian Democratic Party (Kristeleg Folkeparti)	1
Red Party (Raudt)	1
Centre Party (Senterpartiet)	10
Socialist Left Party (Sosialistisk Venstreparti)	5
Liberal Party (Venstre)	1
Total number of members:	43

Voss heradsstyre 2019–2023
Party name (in Nynorsk)	Number of representatives
Labour Party (Arbeidarpartiet)	13
Progress Party (Framstegspartiet)	2
Green Party (Miljøpartiet Dei Grøne)	2
Conservative Party (Høgre)	5
Christian Democratic Party (Kristeleg Folkeparti)	2
Red Party (Raudt)	1
Centre Party (Senterpartiet)	14
Socialist Left Party (Sosialistisk Venstreparti)	3
Liberal Party (Venstre)	1
Total number of members:	43
Note: On 1 January 2020, Granvin Municipality became part of Voss Municipality.

Voss kommunestyre 2015–2019
Party name (in Nynorsk)	Number of representatives
Labour Party (Arbeidarpartiet)	16
Progress Party (Framstegspartiet)	2
Green Party (Miljøpartiet Dei Grøne)	2
Conservative Party (Høgre)	6
Christian Democratic Party (Kristeleg Folkeparti)	2
Red Party (Raudt)	1
Centre Party (Senterpartiet)	9
Socialist Left Party (Sosialistisk Venstreparti)	2
Liberal Party (Venstre)	3
Total number of members:	43

Voss kommunestyre 2011–2015
Party name (in Nynorsk)	Number of representatives
Labour Party (Arbeidarpartiet)	12
Progress Party (Framstegspartiet)	4
Conservative Party (Høgre)	8
Christian Democratic Party (Kristeleg Folkeparti)	2
Red Party (Raudt)	1
Centre Party (Senterpartiet)	8
Socialist Left Party (Sosialistisk Venstreparti)	3
Liberal Party (Venstre)	5
Total number of members:	43

Voss kommunestyre 2007–2011
Party name (in Nynorsk)	Number of representatives
Labour Party (Arbeidarpartiet)	13
Progress Party (Framstegspartiet)	5
Conservative Party (Høgre)	3
Christian Democratic Party (Kristeleg Folkeparti)	3
Red Party (Raudt)	2
Centre Party (Senterpartiet)	10
Socialist Left Party (Sosialistisk Venstreparti)	4
Liberal Party (Venstre)	3
Total number of members:	43

Voss kommunestyre 2003–2007
Party name (in Nynorsk)	Number of representatives
Labour Party (Arbeidarpartiet)	16
Progress Party (Framstegspartiet)	5
Conservative Party (Høgre)	3
Christian Democratic Party (Kristeleg Folkeparti)	3
Red Electoral Alliance (Raud Valallianse)	1
Centre Party (Senterpartiet)	8
Socialist Left Party (Sosialistisk Venstreparti)	5
Liberal Party (Venstre)	2
Total number of members:	43

Voss kommunestyre 1999–2003
Party name (in Nynorsk)	Number of representatives
Labour Party (Arbeidarpartiet)	18
Progress Party (Framstegspartiet)	3
Conservative Party (Høgre)	4
Christian Democratic Party (Kristeleg Folkeparti)	3
Red Electoral Alliance (Raud Valallianse)	1
Centre Party (Senterpartiet)	9
Socialist Left Party (Sosialistisk Venstreparti)	3
Liberal Party (Venstre)	2
Total number of members:	43

Voss kommunestyre 1995–1999
Party name (in Nynorsk)	Number of representatives
Labour Party (Arbeidarpartiet)	12
Progress Party (Framstegspartiet)	2
Conservative Party (Høgre)	4
Christian Democratic Party (Kristeleg Folkeparti)	3
Red Electoral Alliance (Raud Valallianse)	1
Centre Party (Senterpartiet)	13
Socialist Left Party (Sosialistisk Venstreparti)	3
Liberal Party (Venstre)	3
Voss local list (Voss Bygdeliste)	2
Total number of members:	43

Voss kommunestyre 1991–1995
Party name (in Nynorsk)	Number of representatives
Labour Party (Arbeidarpartiet)	6
Progress Party (Framstegspartiet)	1
Conservative Party (Høgre)	3
Christian Democratic Party (Kristeleg Folkeparti)	2
Red Electoral Alliance (Raud Valallianse)	2
Centre Party (Senterpartiet)	15
Socialist Left Party (Sosialistisk Venstreparti)	3
Liberal Party (Venstre)	3
Voss local list (Voss Bygdeliste)	8
Total number of members:	43

Voss kommunestyre 1987–1991
Party name (in Nynorsk)	Number of representatives
Labour Party (Arbeidarpartiet)	20
Progress Party (Framstegspartiet)	3
Conservative Party (Høgre)	4
Christian Democratic Party (Kristeleg Folkeparti)	4
Red Electoral Alliance (Raud Valallianse)	1
Centre Party (Senterpartiet)	7
Socialist Left Party (Sosialistisk Venstreparti)	1
Joint list of the Liberal Party (Venstre) and Liberal People's Party (Liberale Folkepartiet)	3
Total number of members:	43

Voss kommunestyre 1983–1987
Party name (in Nynorsk)	Number of representatives
Labour Party (Arbeidarpartiet)	18
Progress Party (Framstegspartiet)	1
Conservative Party (Høgre)	7
Christian Democratic Party (Kristeleg Folkeparti)	4
Liberal People's Party (Liberale Folkepartiet)	1
Centre Party (Senterpartiet)	8
Socialist Left Party (Sosialistisk Venstreparti)	1
Liberal Party (Venstre)	3
Total number of members:	43

Voss kommunestyre 1979–1983
Party name (in Nynorsk)	Number of representatives
Labour Party (Arbeidarpartiet)	16
Conservative Party (Høgre)	8
Christian Democratic Party (Kristeleg Folkeparti)	5
New People's Party (Nye Folkepartiet)	1
Centre Party (Senterpartiet)	9
Socialist Left Party (Sosialistisk Venstreparti)	1
Liberal Party (Venstre)	3
Total number of members:	43

Voss kommunestyre 1975–1979
Party name (in Nynorsk)	Number of representatives
Labour Party (Arbeidarpartiet)	18
Conservative Party (Høgre)	4
Christian Democratic Party (Kristeleg Folkeparti)	5
New People's Party (Nye Folkepartiet)	2
Centre Party (Senterpartiet)	11
Socialist Left Party (Sosialistisk Venstreparti)	2
Liberal Party (Venstre)	1
Total number of members:	43

Voss kommunestyre 1971–1975
Party name (in Nynorsk)	Number of representatives
Labour Party (Arbeidarpartiet)	18
Conservative Party (Høgre)	2
Christian Democratic Party (Kristeleg Folkeparti)	4
Centre Party (Senterpartiet)	11
Socialist People's Party (Sosialistisk Folkeparti)	1
Liberal Party (Venstre)	4
Local List(s) (Lokale lister)	3
Total number of members:	43

Voss kommunestyre 1967–1971
Party name (in Nynorsk)	Number of representatives
Labour Party (Arbeidarpartiet)	19
Conservative Party (Høgre)	3
Christian Democratic Party (Kristeleg Folkeparti)	3
Centre Party (Senterpartiet)	11
Socialist People's Party (Sosialistisk Folkeparti)	1
Liberal Party (Venstre)	6
Total number of members:	43

Voss kommunestyre 1963–1967
Party name (in Nynorsk)	Number of representatives
Labour Party (Arbeidarpartiet)	20
Conservative Party (Høgre)	3
Christian Democratic Party (Kristeleg Folkeparti)	3
Centre Party (Senterpartiet)	12
Liberal Party (Venstre)	5
Total number of members:	43
Note: On 1 January 1964, Evanger Municipality and Vossestrand Municipality became part of Voss Municipality.

Voss heradsstyre 1959–1963
Party name (in Nynorsk)	Number of representatives
Labour Party (Arbeidarpartiet)	17
Conservative Party (Høgre)	2
Christian Democratic Party (Kristeleg Folkeparti)	3
Centre Party (Senterpartiet)	9
Liberal Party (Venstre)	4
Total number of members:	35

Voss heradsstyre 1955–1959
Party name (in Nynorsk)	Number of representatives
Labour Party (Arbeidarpartiet)	17
Conservative Party (Høgre)	2
Christian Democratic Party (Kristeleg Folkeparti)	3
Farmers' Party (Bondepartiet)	9
Liberal Party (Venstre)	4
Total number of members:	35

Voss heradsstyre 1951–1955
Party name (in Nynorsk)	Number of representatives
Labour Party (Arbeidarpartiet)	12
Conservative Party (Høgre)	1
Christian Democratic Party (Kristeleg Folkeparti)	3
Farmers' Party (Bondepartiet)	8
Liberal Party (Venstre)	4
Total number of members:	28

Voss heradsstyre 1947–1951
Party name (in Nynorsk)	Number of representatives
Labour Party (Arbeidarpartiet)	10
Conservative Party (Høgre)	1
Communist Party (Kommunistiske Parti)	1
Christian Democratic Party (Kristeleg Folkeparti)	3
Farmers' Party (Bondepartiet)	9
Liberal Party (Venstre)	4
Total number of members:	28

Voss heradsstyre 1945–1947
Party name (in Nynorsk)	Number of representatives
Labour Party (Arbeidarpartiet)	10
Communist Party (Kommunistiske Parti)	2
Farmers' Party (Bondepartiet)	8
Liberal Party (Venstre)	5
Local List(s) (Lokale lister)	3
Total number of members:	28

Voss heradsstyre 1937–1941*
Party name (in Nynorsk)	Number of representatives
Labour Party (Arbeidarpartiet)	10
Farmers' Party (Bondepartiet)	10
Liberal Party (Venstre)	8
Total number of members:	28
Note: Due to the German occupation of Norway during World War II, no elections were held for new municipal councils until after the war ended in 1945.

=== Mayors ===
The mayor (Nynorsk: ordførar) of Voss Municipality is the political leader of the municipality and the chairperson of the municipal council. The following people have held this position:

- 1838–1841: David L. Hustveit
- 1842–1849: A. von Westen Sylow Koren
- 1850–1857: David L. Hustveit
- 1858–1877: Ole K. Litsheim
- 1878–1889: Mathias G. Dugstad (MV)
- 1890–1891: Ivar J. Rivenes (MV)
- 1892–1893: Lars O. Kindem (V)
- 1894–1907: Olaf Josefson Bjørgum (V)
- 1908–1925: Nils J. Finne (V)
- 1926–1928: Mads Haga (V)
- 1929–1931: Lars L. Hustveit (Bp)
- 1932–1934: Mads Haga (V)
- 1935–1937: Lars L. Hustveit (Bp)
- 1938–1938: Mads Haga (V)
- 1939–1941: Isak Hjelle (Bp)
- 1941–1941: Amund Gjersvik (NS)
- 1942–1945: Halle N. Vinsand (NS)
- 1945–1945: Mads Haga (V)
- 1946–1954: Isak Hjelle (Bp)
- 1955–1955: David Gjerme (V)
- 1956–1957: Lars Leiro (Bp)
- 1958–1959: David Gjerme (V)
- 1960–1963: Arne Nilsen (Ap)
- 1964–1971: Lars Nesheim Hovda (Sp)
- 1972–1975: Nils Mugaas (Ap)
- 1976–1983: Anders S. Ringheim (Sp)
- 1984–1991: Peder Vangsnes (Ap)
- 1992–1999: Ragnhild Skjerveggen (Sp)
- 1999–2007: Bjørn Christensen (Ap)
- 2007–2011: Gunn Berit Lunde Aarvik (Ap)
- 2011–2023: Hans-Erik Ringkjøb (Ap)
- 2023–present: Tonje Såkvitne (Sp)

== Geography and climate ==
Voss Municipality encompasses the whole traditional district of Voss plus the Granvin area which was historically part of the district of Hardanger. Voss Municipality lies north of the Hardangerfjorden and east of the innermost part of Bolstadsfjorden. It includes the valleys that head inland from there. Voss Municipality has several large lakes: Evangervatnet, Hamlagrøvatnet, Lønavatnet, Oppheimsvatnet, Torfinnsvatnet, and Vangsvatnet. In the north, Voss Municipality reaches to the Nærøydalen valley, which leads to the Nærøyfjorden. The Stalheimsfossen waterfall near Stalheim sits just above that valley. The Raundalen valley in the east is the main route of the Bergensbanen railway line, which connects eastern and western Norway. The highest point in the municipality is the 1,575.92-metre (5,170.3 ft) tall mountain Olsskavlen.

Voss Municipality has a humid continental climate (Dfb in the Köppen climate classification if 0 °C (32 °F) is used as winter threshold. If the original −3 °C (27 °F) is used, then Voss will be classified as an oceanic climate (Cfb). The wettest time of year is October - January, and the driest season is April - July. The all-time high temperature is 34.1 °C (93.4 °F) recorded 24 July 2014; the all-time low is −30.4 °C (−22.7 °F) recorded 8 January 2010. Vossavangen receives significantly less precipitation than other villages in the municipality as it is in the rain shadow of the surrounding mountains. Øvstedal, in the west of the municipality, receives 3230.1 mm of precipitation per year.

Climate data for Vossevangen (1991–2020 normals, 54 m (177 ft), extremes 2002–2024)
Month	Jan	Feb	Mar	Apr	May	Jun	Jul	Aug	Sep	Oct	Nov	Dec	Year
Record high °C (°F)	9.8 (49.6)	11.7 (53.1)	16.3 (61.3)	23.4 (74.1)	29.4 (84.9)	31.1 (88.0)	34.1 (93.4)	32.4 (90.3)	27 (81)	23 (73)	15.4 (59.7)	11.6 (52.9)	34.1 (93.4)
Daily mean °C (°F)	−2 (28)	−2.1 (28.2)	1.1 (34.0)	5.3 (41.5)	9.8 (49.6)	13.5 (56.3)	15.8 (60.4)	14.8 (58.6)	11 (52)	5.8 (42.4)	1.6 (34.9)	−1.6 (29.1)	6.1 (42.9)
Record low °C (°F)	−30.4 (−22.7)	−25.9 (−14.6)	−24.1 (−11.4)	−10.6 (12.9)	−3.5 (25.7)	−0.6 (30.9)	2.7 (36.9)	3.1 (37.6)	−1.3 (29.7)	−9.6 (14.7)	−17 (1)	−29.7 (−21.5)	−30.4 (−22.7)
Average precipitation mm (inches)	158.4 (6.24)	126 (5.0)	109 (4.3)	71 (2.8)	58.7 (2.31)	64.1 (2.52)	80.6 (3.17)	100.3 (3.95)	128.7 (5.07)	149.8 (5.90)	151.9 (5.98)	170.6 (6.72)	1,369.1 (53.96)
Source 1: yr.no/Norwegian Meteorological Institute
Source 2: eklima/met.no

Climate data for Øvstedal 1991–2020 (316 m)
Month	Jan	Feb	Mar	Apr	May	Jun	Jul	Aug	Sep	Oct	Nov	Dec	Year
Average precipitation mm (inches)	371.0 (14.61)	311.1 (12.25)	291.6 (11.48)	182.9 (7.20)	145.2 (5.72)	160.2 (6.31)	176.1 (6.93)	220.3 (8.67)	301.7 (11.88)	320.4 (12.61)	343.6 (13.53)	406.0 (15.98)	3,230.1 (127.17)
Average precipitation days	20	17	17	14	14	13	16	17	17	18	18	19	200
Source: NOAA

Climate data for Voss, Norway 1961–1990 (125 m)
Month	Jan	Feb	Mar	Apr	May	Jun	Jul	Aug	Sep	Oct	Nov	Dec	Year
Mean daily maximum °C (°F)	−0.7 (30.7)	0.3 (32.5)	4.5 (40.1)	8.7 (47.7)	15.0 (59.0)	19.0 (66.2)	19.8 (67.6)	19.0 (66.2)	13.9 (57.0)	9.3 (48.7)	3.2 (37.8)	0.6 (33.1)	9.4 (48.9)
Daily mean °C (°F)	−4.5 (23.9)	−3.8 (25.2)	0.2 (32.4)	3.9 (39.0)	9.3 (48.7)	13.2 (55.8)	14.2 (57.6)	13.4 (56.1)	9.4 (48.9)	5.9 (42.6)	0.3 (32.5)	−3.0 (26.6)	4.9 (40.8)
Mean daily minimum °C (°F)	−7.0 (19.4)	−7.2 (19.0)	−3.4 (25.9)	−0.4 (31.3)	4.0 (39.2)	7.9 (46.2)	9.8 (49.6)	9.2 (48.6)	6.0 (42.8)	2.8 (37.0)	−2.1 (28.2)	−5.5 (22.1)	1.2 (34.1)
Average precipitation mm (inches)	123 (4.8)	89 (3.5)	97 (3.8)	49 (1.9)	56 (2.2)	71 (2.8)	78 (3.1)	95 (3.7)	160 (6.3)	161 (6.3)	150 (5.9)	151 (5.9)	1,280 (50.2)
Average precipitation days	15.5	10.0	11.5	9.1	10.1	10.7	12.1	13.0	16.5	17.5	16.1	16.4	158.5
Source: Weatherbase.com

== Tourism ==
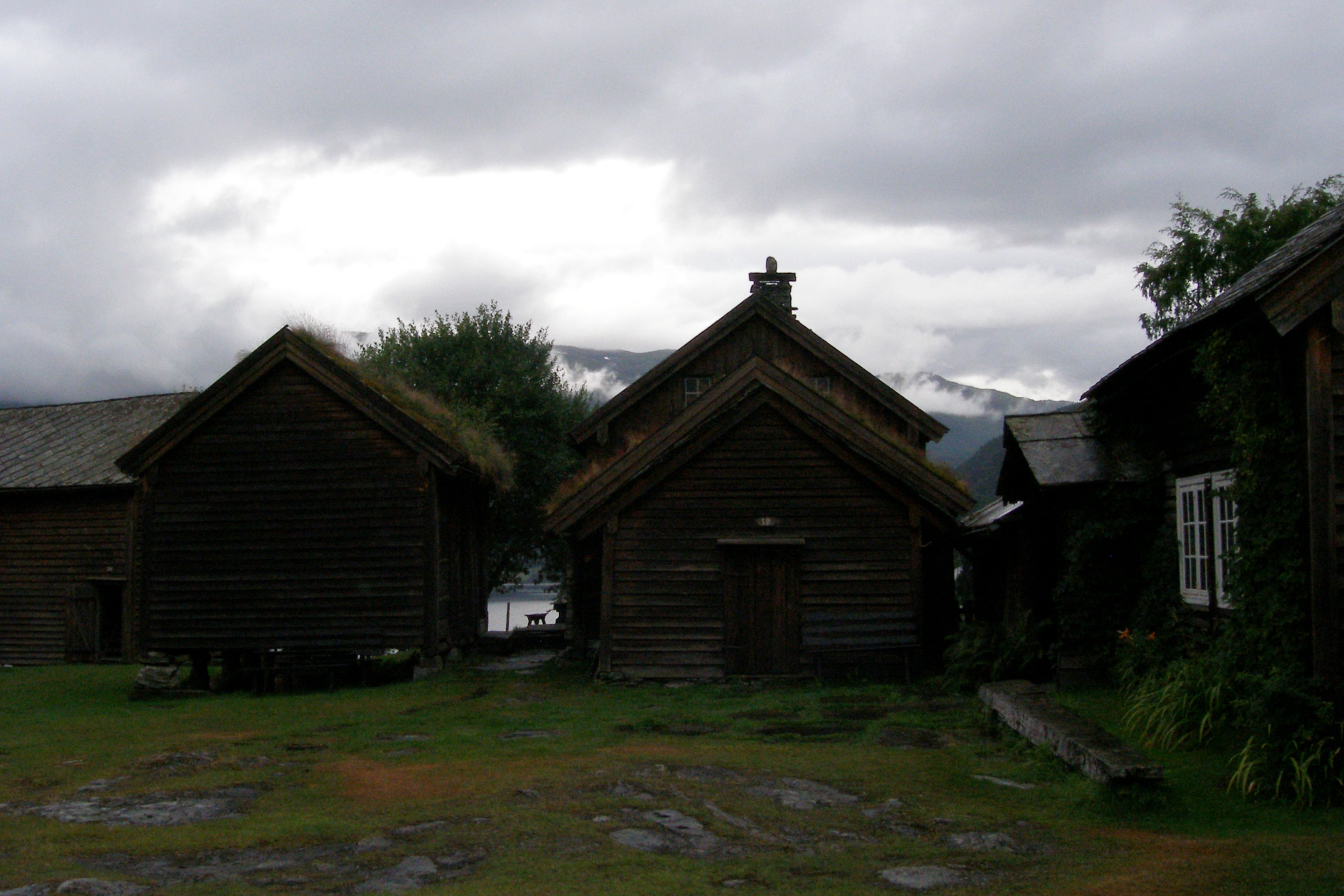
Farm buildings at the Voss Museum.

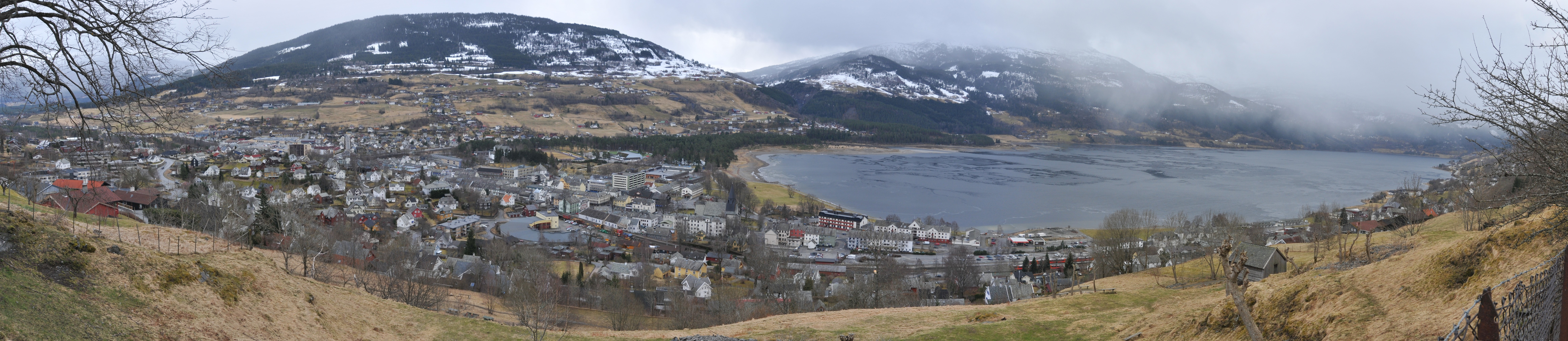
Panoramic view of Voss in early spring.

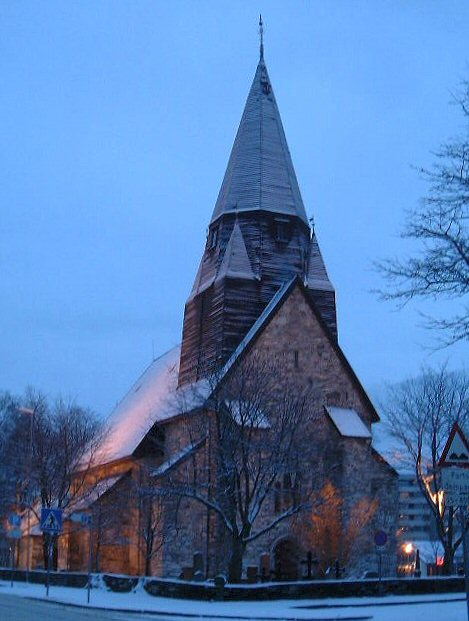
Voss church, built in 1277.

Voss Municipality is surrounded by snow-capped mountains, forests, lakes and fast-flowing whitewater rivers. This has led to its development as a notable center of skiing, water sports, skydiving, paragliding and other adventure sports. Every year in the last week of June the area hosts the Ekstremsportveko (Extreme Sports Week), which is regarded as the world's premier extreme sports festival. Bømoen, the local airstrip, is home to Skydive Voss, one of the largest dropzones in Norway, as well as a gliding club. The rivers provide various levels of white water, attracting kayaking, rafting and river boarding. Kite surfing and para-bungee may be seen on lake Vangsvatnet. The ski area, to the north of the town, is accessible via a cable car, Hangursbanen. There is also chair lift access from Bavallen, a short distance northeast of Voss.

The municipality's proximity to the Sognefjord and its position between Bergen and Flåm on the scenic railway have made it popular with tourists. One of the sights on the road to Flåm is the waterfall Tvindefossen.

The Voss Museum displays several old farmsteads, including a larger-than-life stone statue of Lars O. Kindem. Next to the open-air part, there is a museum with over 20,000 items from traditional farm life.

=== Bird life ===
Voss has a wide range of habitats, from high barren mountains to rich fertile valleys. The large areas of coniferous forests provide food and shelter for a host of species, while the many wetland areas are regarded as some of the most interesting birding habitats in the county. There is a bird reserve at Lønaøyane with marked paths and a tower hide. Over 155 species have been seen there. Many are common in Scandinavia, but the area has also produced such unexpected species as the great egret, European hobby, and woodlark.

== Notable people ==
=== The Arts ===
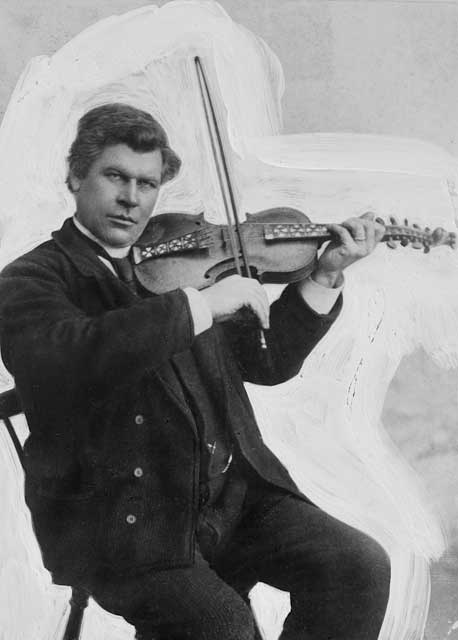
Sjur Helgeland, 1890

- Christiane Schreiber (1822–1898), a portrait painter
- Knud Bergslien (1827–1908), a painter, art teacher and master artist
- Ola Mosafinn (1828–1912), a Hardanger fiddle player and composer
- Brynjulf Bergslien (1830–1898), a sculptor
- Nils Bergslien (1853–1928), an illustrator, painter, and sculptor
- Brita Bjørgum (1858–1906), a writer, teacher and women's rights activist
- Sjur Helgeland (1858−1924), a hardingfele fiddler and composer
- Lars Tvinde (1886–1973), a stage and film actor
- Lars Fletre (1904–1977), a Norwegian-American designer, sculptor, and painter
- Liv Bernhoft Osa (born 1957), an actress
- Olav Dale (1958–2014), a composer, orchestra leader, and jazz saxophonist
- Kåre Kolve (born 1964) & Ivar Kolve (born 1967), jazz musicians

=== Athletes ===
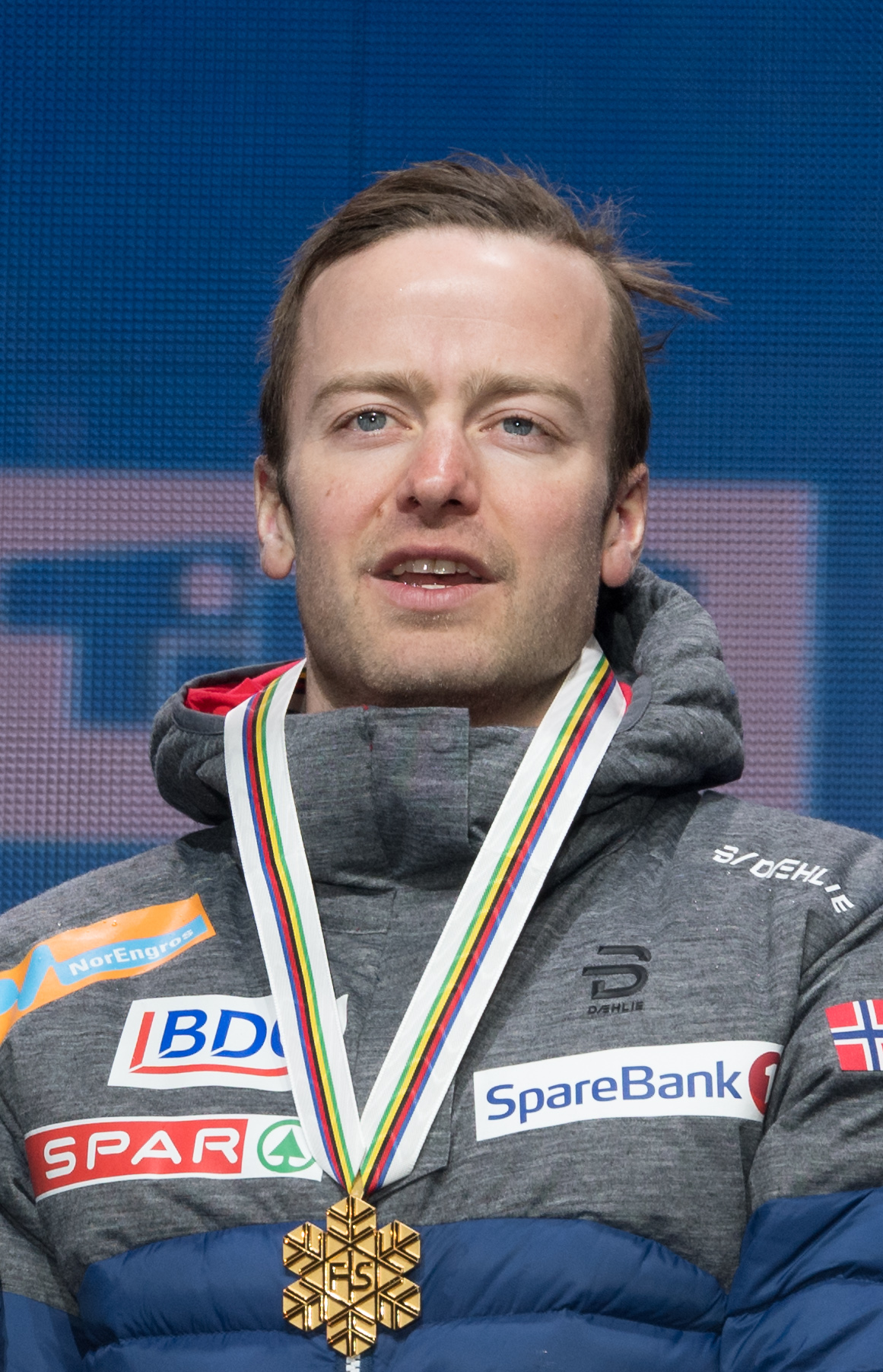
Sjur Røthe, 2019

- Jon Istad (1937–2012), a biathlete and sport shooter
- Rune Hauge (born 1954), a football agent
- Odd Lirhus (born 1956), a 1978 World Cup winner in biathlon
- Gisle Fenne (born 1963) a former World Cup silver medalist in biathlon
- Trond Egil Soltvedt (born 1967), a former footballer with 350 caps and 4 for Norway
- Hilde Synnøve Lid (born 1971), a freestyle skier Olympic medallist
- Astrid Lødemel (born 1971), a retired alpine skier and 1992 World Cup silver medalist
- Gro Marit Istad Kristiansen (born 1978), a 2005 World champion in biathlon
- Jori Mørkve (born 1980), a former biathlete
- Alexander Ødegaard (born 1980), a former footballer with 4 caps for Norway
- Sjur Røthe (born 1988), a cross-country skier
- Hilde Fenne (born 1993), a retired biathlete
- Hedda Hosås (born 2001), a rallycross driver

=== Olympic champions ===
Voss is a winter sports center and has in recent times been the home of many world-class athletes in several winter sports, most prominently biathlon, but also alpine skiing, Nordic skiing and freestyle skiing. In all, athletes from Voss have won 6 gold medals, 5 silver medals and 7 bronze medals at winter Olympic games. Athletes from Voss have been present, representing Norway, at every winter Olympic games except one since 1948 Winter Olympics, the exception being 1972.

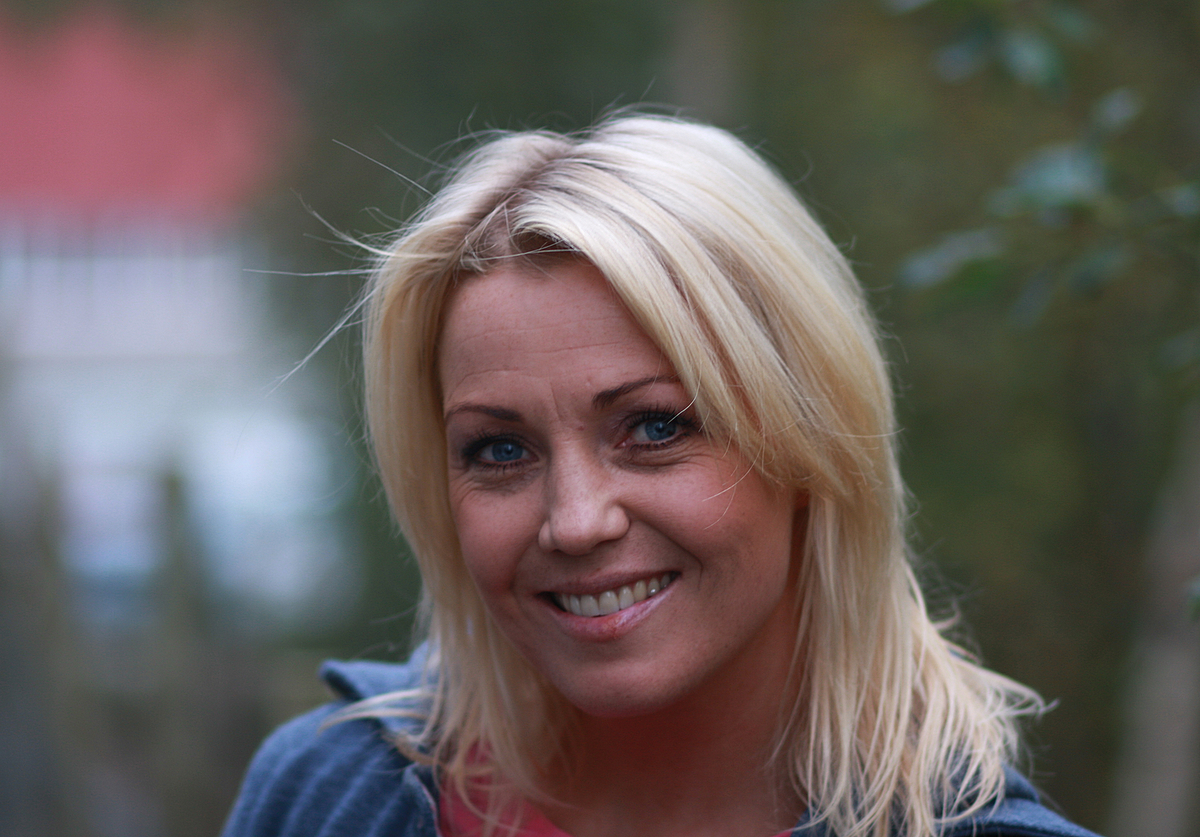
Kari Traa, 2008

- Eirik Kvalfoss, 1984 Winter Olympics (biathlon, sprint)
- Kristen Skjeldal, 1992 Winter Olympics (cross-country skiing, relay)
- Hilde Synnøve Lid, 1994 Winter Olympics bronze medal winner in freestyle
- Jan Einar Thorsen, 1994 Winter Olympics, bronze medal winner in downhill
- Kari Traa, 2002 Winter Olympics (freestyle skiing, moguls)
- Egil Gjelland, 2002 Winter Olympics (biathlon, relay)
- Lars Bystøl, 2006 Winter Olympics (ski jumping, K90)

=== Public Servants & TV ===
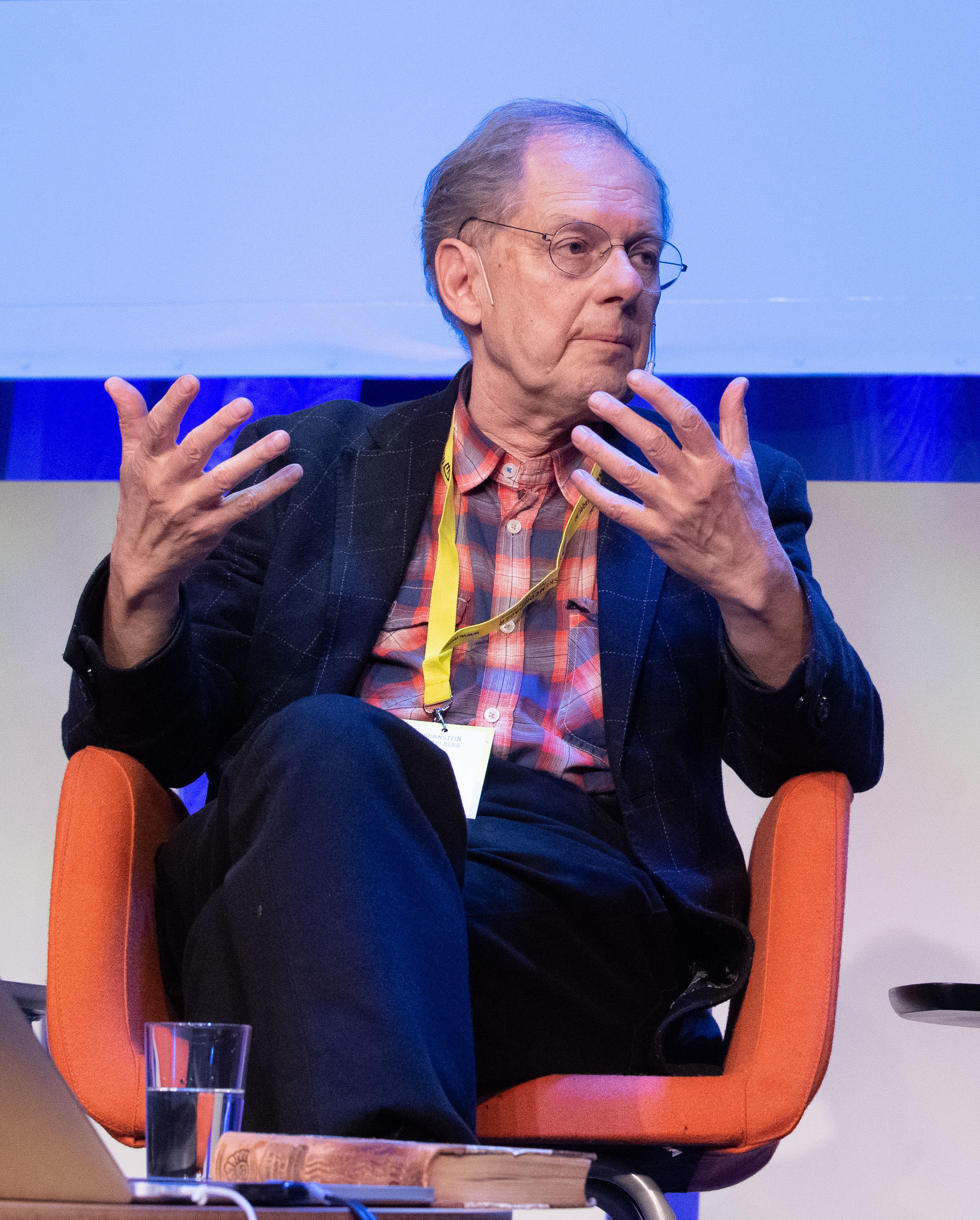
Gunnstein Akselberg, 2019

- Jens Gran Gleditsch (1860–1931), a theologian and Bishop of Nidaros
- Johannes Lid (1886–1971), a botanist
- Lars Leiro (1914–2005), a Norwegian politician and former Transport Minister
- Svein Blindheim (1916–2013), a military officer known for his resistance work
- Jon Lilletun (1945–2006), a politician who was Minister of Education and Research from 1997-2001
- Gunnstein Akselberg (born 1949), a linguist and academic
- Ingvild Bryn (born 1961), a journalist and news anchor for NRK
- Arne Hjeltnes (born 1963), a writer and presenter for TV2
- Linda Eide (born 1969), a TV and radio presenter, comedian, actor, and chat-show host
- Guri Solberg (born 1976), a TV host at TV2

=== Norwegian-Americans ===
Like the rest of Western Norway, Voss saw large-scale emigration, particularly to the United States, in the 19th and early 20th centuries.

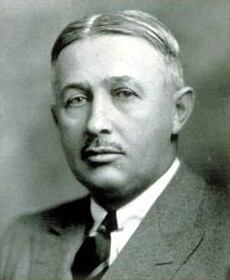
Torkild Rieber on the cover page of Time Magazine.

- Elling Eielsen (1804–1883), the first Lutheran Church leader in the USA
- Iver Lawson (1821–1871), a real estate investor and newspaper publisher
- John Anderson (1836–1910), the founder and publisher of Skandinaven
- Eli Pederson (1837–1909), a Wisconsin State Assemblyman
- Knute Nelson (1843–1923), a US Senator and the 12th Governor of Minnesota 1893–1895
- Canute R. Matson (1843–1903), the Sheriff of Cook County, Illinois
- Aad J. Vinje (1857–1929), the Chief Justice of the Wisconsin Supreme Court
- Thorstein Himle (1857–1925), a missionary with the Lutheran Hauge Synod
- Ragnvald Nestos (1877–1942), the 13th Governor of North Dakota from 1921–1925.
- Torkild Rieber (1882–1968), a chairman of Texaco
- Knute Rockne (1888–1931), an American footballer and coach who was commemorated by a memorial in Vossevangen
- Lars Fletre (1904–1977), a designer and sculptor

=== Science ===
- Aad Knutsson Gjelle (1768–1840), a cartographer
