= Tvindefossen =

Tvindefossen Trollafossen
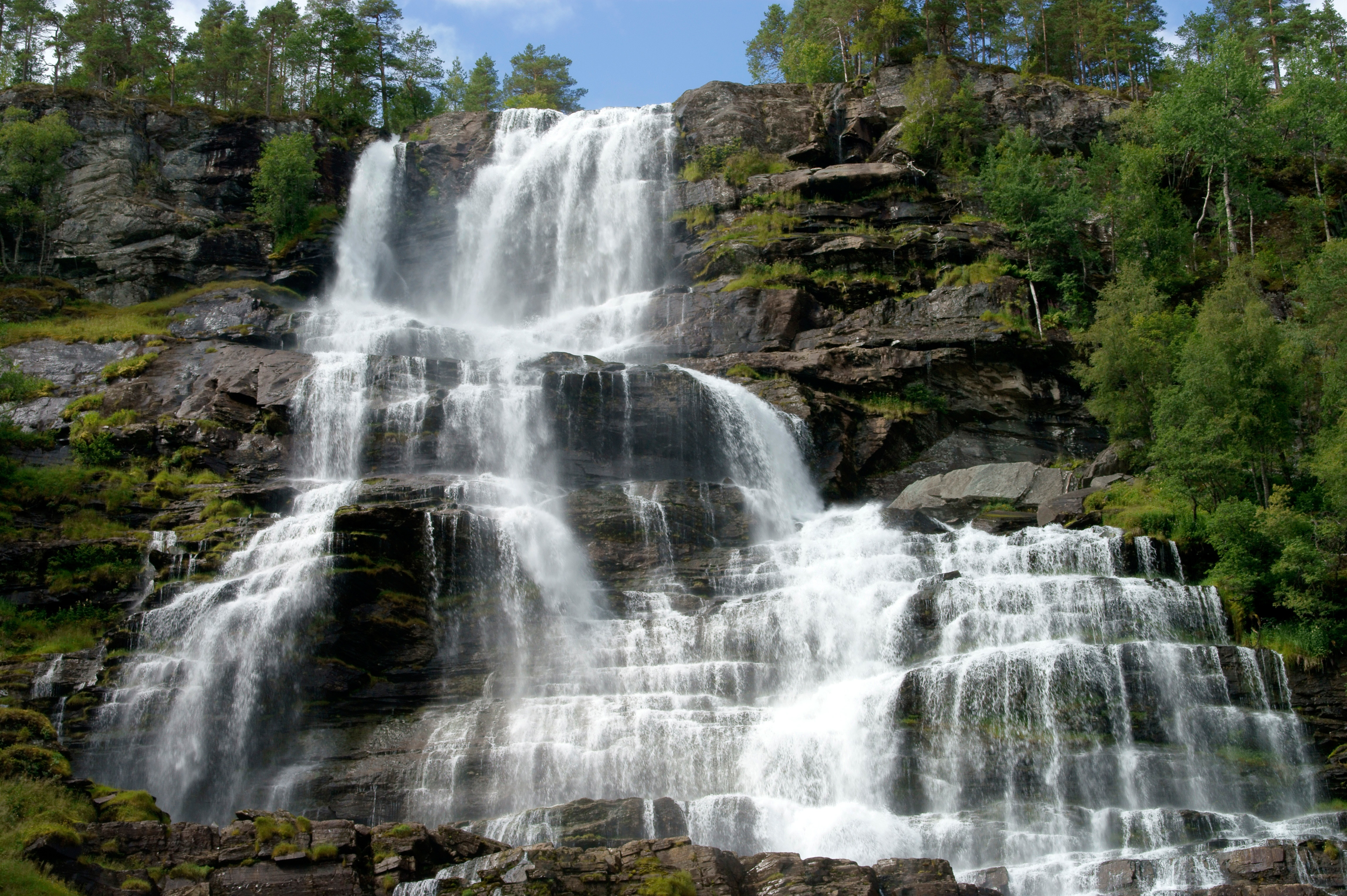

- Location within Vestland Location within Norway
- Location: Vestland, Norway
- Coordinates: 60.726244°N 6.484203°E
- Type: Tiered Plunges
- Total height: 116 metres (381 ft)
- Number of drops: 2
- Total width: 61 metres (200 ft)
- Average width: 46 metres (151 ft)
- Run: 152 metres (499 ft)
- Watercourse: Kroelvi
- Average flow rate: 4 cubic metres per second (140 cu ft/s)

Tvindefossen (also written Tvinnefossen; also called Trollafossen) is a waterfall in Voss Municipality in Vestland county, Norway. It is located about 12 kilometres (7.5 mi) north of the village of Vossevangen along the European route E16 road to Flåm.

The many-stranded waterfall, often said to be 152 metres (499 ft) high, is actually 116 metres (381 ft), is formed by a small Kroelvi stream, tumbling over a receding cliff. It is famous for its beauty. Buses sometimes stop for people to admire it. It was painted in 1830 by Johan Christian Dahl.

In addition, in the late 1990s the water at Tvindefossen acquired a reputation for rejuvenation and revival of sexual potency that made it one of the most important natural tourist attractions in western Norway, with as many as 200,000 people a year from the U.S., Japan and Russia visiting and filling containers with the water.

At one point it was Norway's ninth most visited natural attraction, with 272,000 visitors.

== See also ==
- List of waterfalls#Norway
