= Aad Knutsson Gjelle =

Norwegian cartographer (1768–1840)

Aad Knutsson Gjelle (31 December 1768 – 27 February 1840) was a Norwegian cartographer.

Gjelle was from Voss in Søndre Bergenhus, Norway. He worked as a public surveyor in Bergen. He was awarded the Order of the Dannebrog (1813).
