= Sjur Bygd =

Norwegian novelist, farmer and politician

Sjur Bygd (28 April 1889 – 29 October 1985) was a Norwegian novelist, farmer and local politician. He was born in Vossestrand Municipality, a son of farmer and mayor Eirik Torsteinson Bygd and Ingebjørg Sjursdotter. He made his literary début in 1915, with the short-story collection Fjell-folk. Among his early novels are Holmgang from 1917 and Valplassen from 1921. Bygd and his literary work was portrayed in the periodical Kirke og Kultur in 1928, and in Syn og Segn in 1941. He served as mayor in Vossestrand from 1926 to 1934. He was awarded the King's Medal of Merit in 1976.
