= Vinje Church, Vestland =

Church in Vestland, Norway

Vinje Church
- Vinje kyrkje
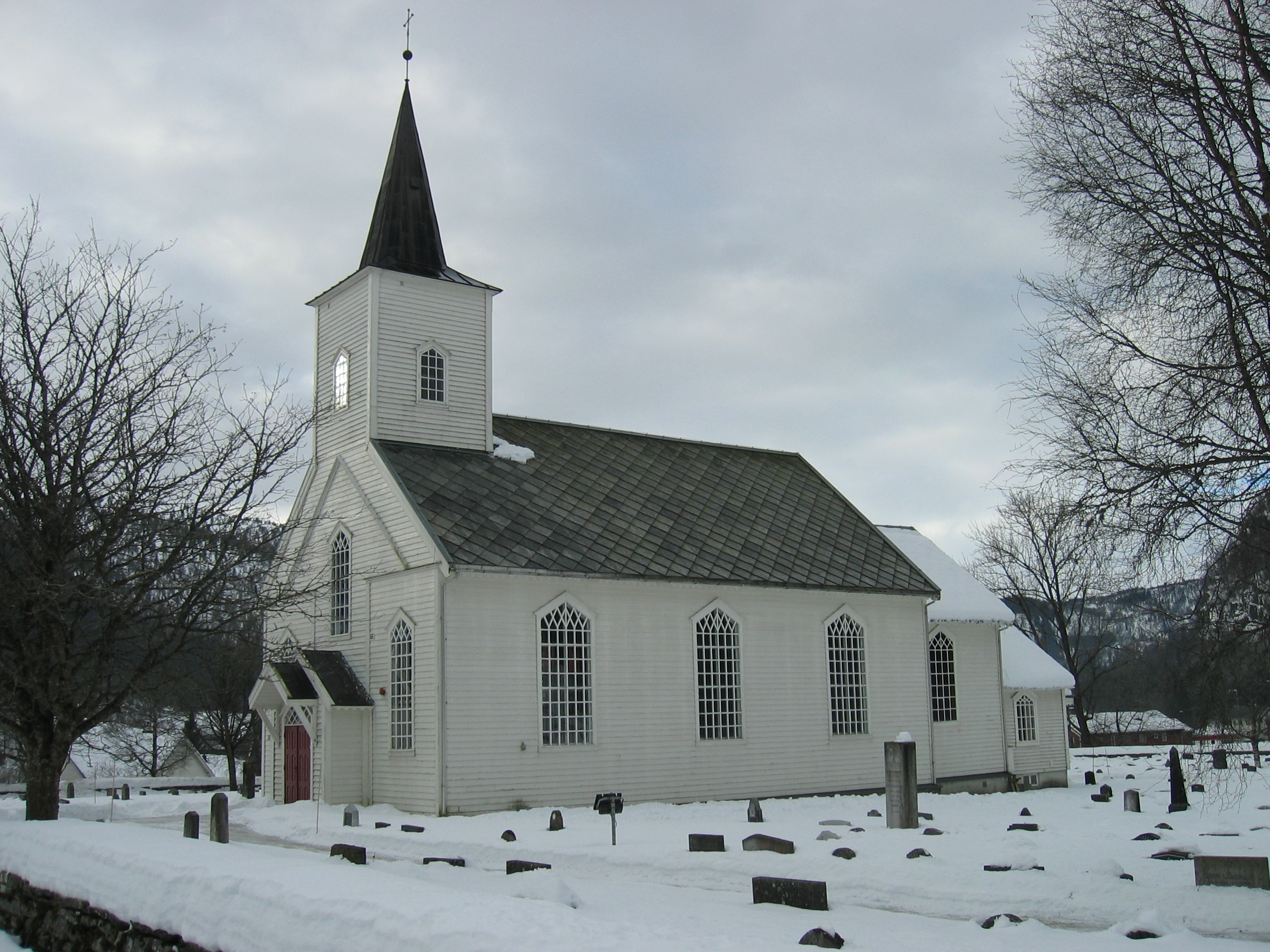
- View of the church
- Vinje Church
- 60°47′33″N 6°30′40″E
- Location: Voss, Vestland
- Country: Norway
- Denomination: Church of Norway
- Previous denomination: Catholic Church
- Churchmanship: Evangelical Lutheran

History
- Status: Parish church
- Founded: 13th century
- Consecrated: 3 October 1871

Architecture
- Functional status: Active
- Architect: Ole Vangberg
- Architectural type: Long church
- Completed: 1871 (155 years ago)

Specifications
- Capacity: 350
- Materials: Wood

Administration
- Diocese: Bjørgvin bispedømme
- Deanery: Hardanger og Voss prosti
- Parish: Vinje
- Norwegian Cultural Heritage Site
- Type: Church
- Status: Not protected
- ID: 85856

Vinje Church (Norwegian: Vinje kyrkje) is a parish church of the Church of Norway in Voss Municipality in Vestland county, Norway. It is located in the village of Vinje. It is the church for the Vinje parish which is part of the Hardanger og Voss prosti (deanery) in the Diocese of Bjørgvin. The white, wooden church was built in a long church design in 1871 using plans drawn up by the architect Ole Vangberg. The church seats about 350 people.

== History ==
The earliest existing historical records of the church date back to the year 1329, but the church was not new that year. The first church was most likely a wooden stave church that was built during the 13th century. The church was located in Upper Vinje, about 1 kilometre (0.62 mi) to the northeast of the present site of the church. Around 1670, the old stave church was torn down and a timber-framed long church was built on the same site. The church had 170 seats and 29 standing places. In 1680, the tower had to be rebuilt, and this time it had a small extension to the north of the base which was used for storage. A photograph of the old church from 1870 exists showing the exterior of that church.

In 1867, it was decided to build a new church to replace the old building, but since Oppheim Church was nearby, it was determined that the new Vinje Church would be built further down the valley to the east. The parish chose to build the new church at Draugsvoll in the village of Vinje, about 1 kilometre (0.62 mi) southwest of the historic location of the church. The parish chose to use the same plans that the architect Ole Vangberg used to design Bruvik Church, except that they wanted the chancel to be slightly longer. John Alver was hired as the lead builder for the project. The new church was built during 1871 and it was consecrated on 3 October 1871 by the local Provost Smitt. In 1873, the old church was torn down and its materials were auctioned off. In 1963, a sacristy was built in the west, a new floor was laid in the church, and the windows were improved. In 1964, the walls were all insulated. Electric heating was installed in the church in 1969.

== Media gallery ==
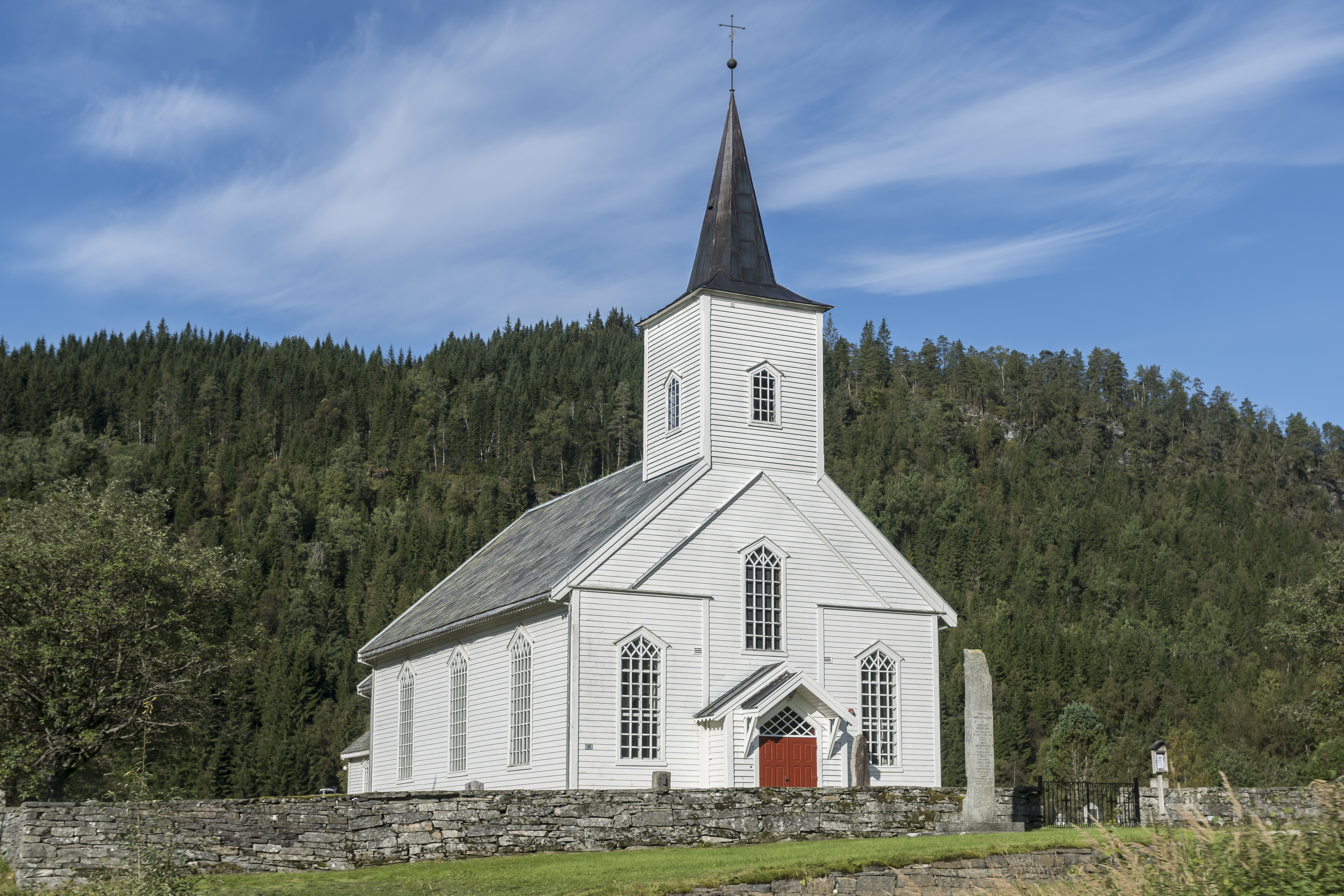

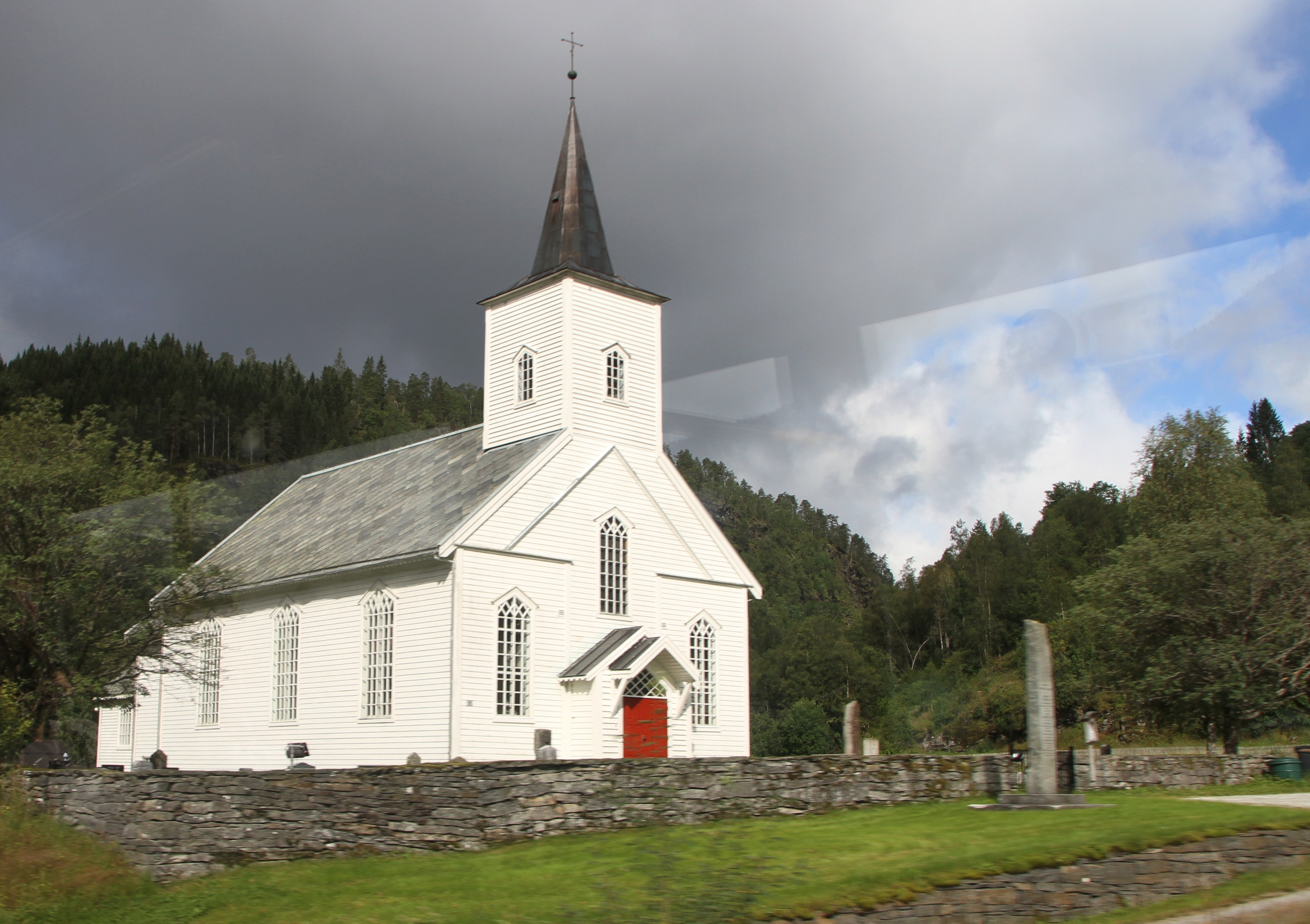

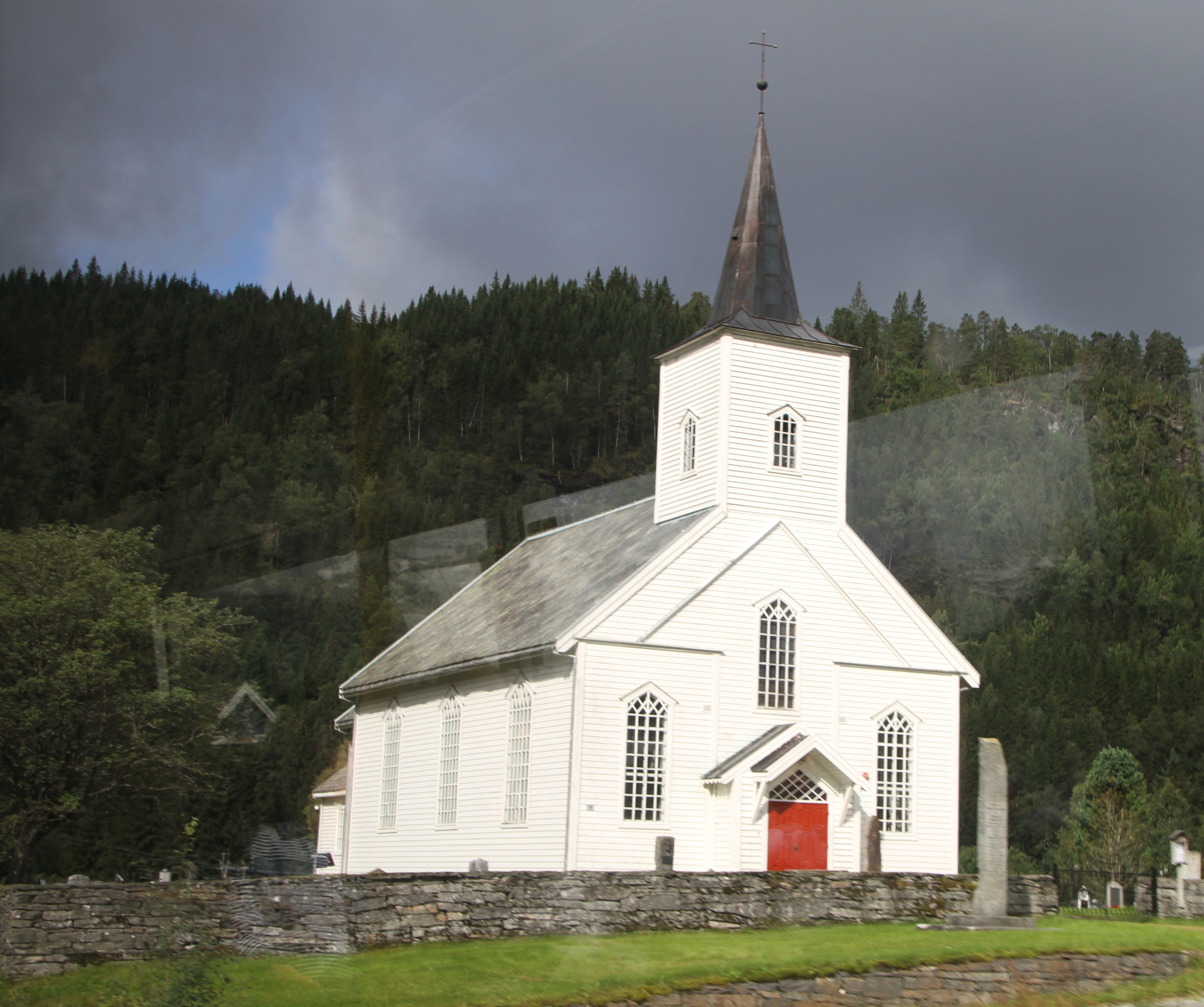

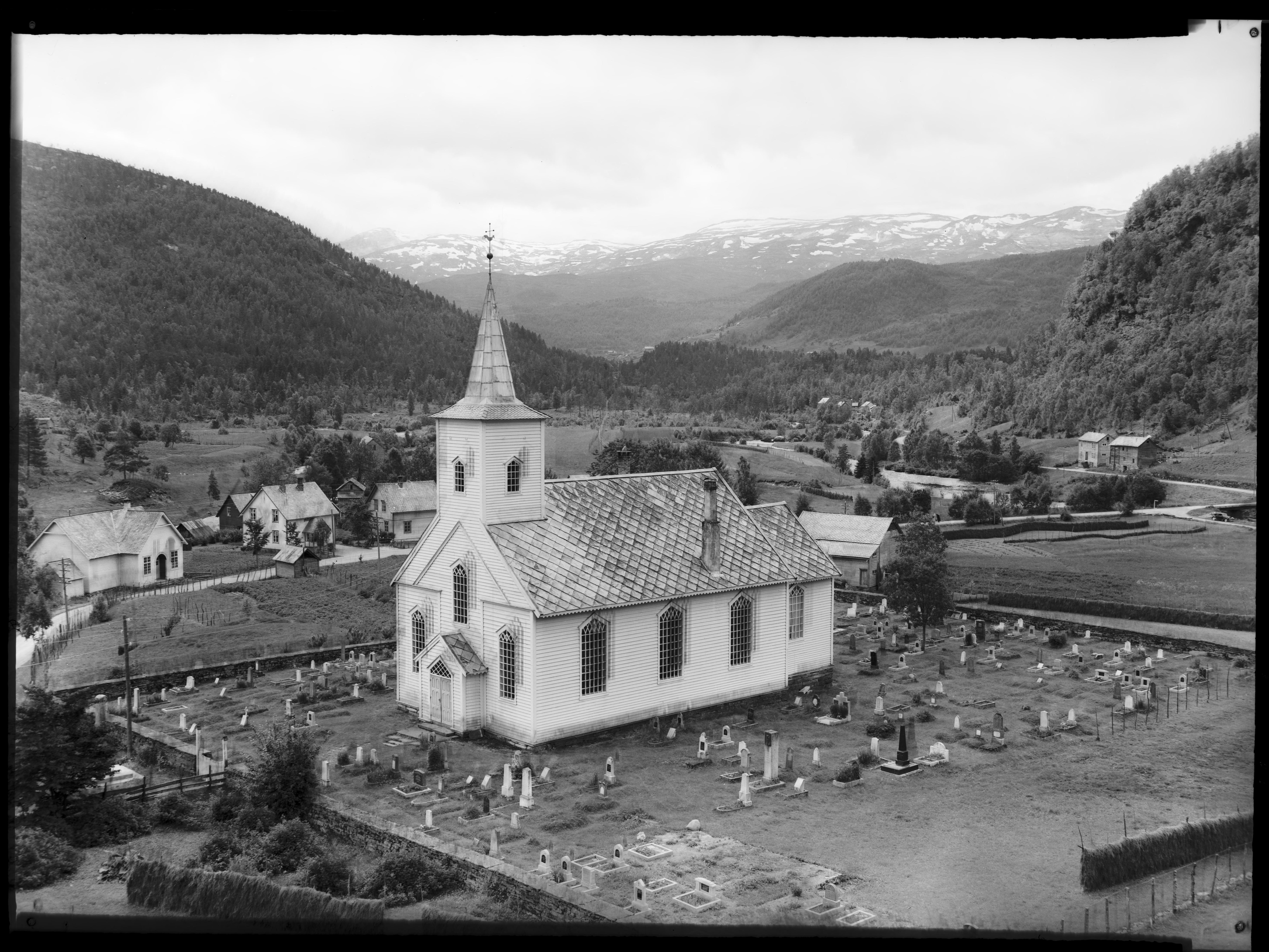

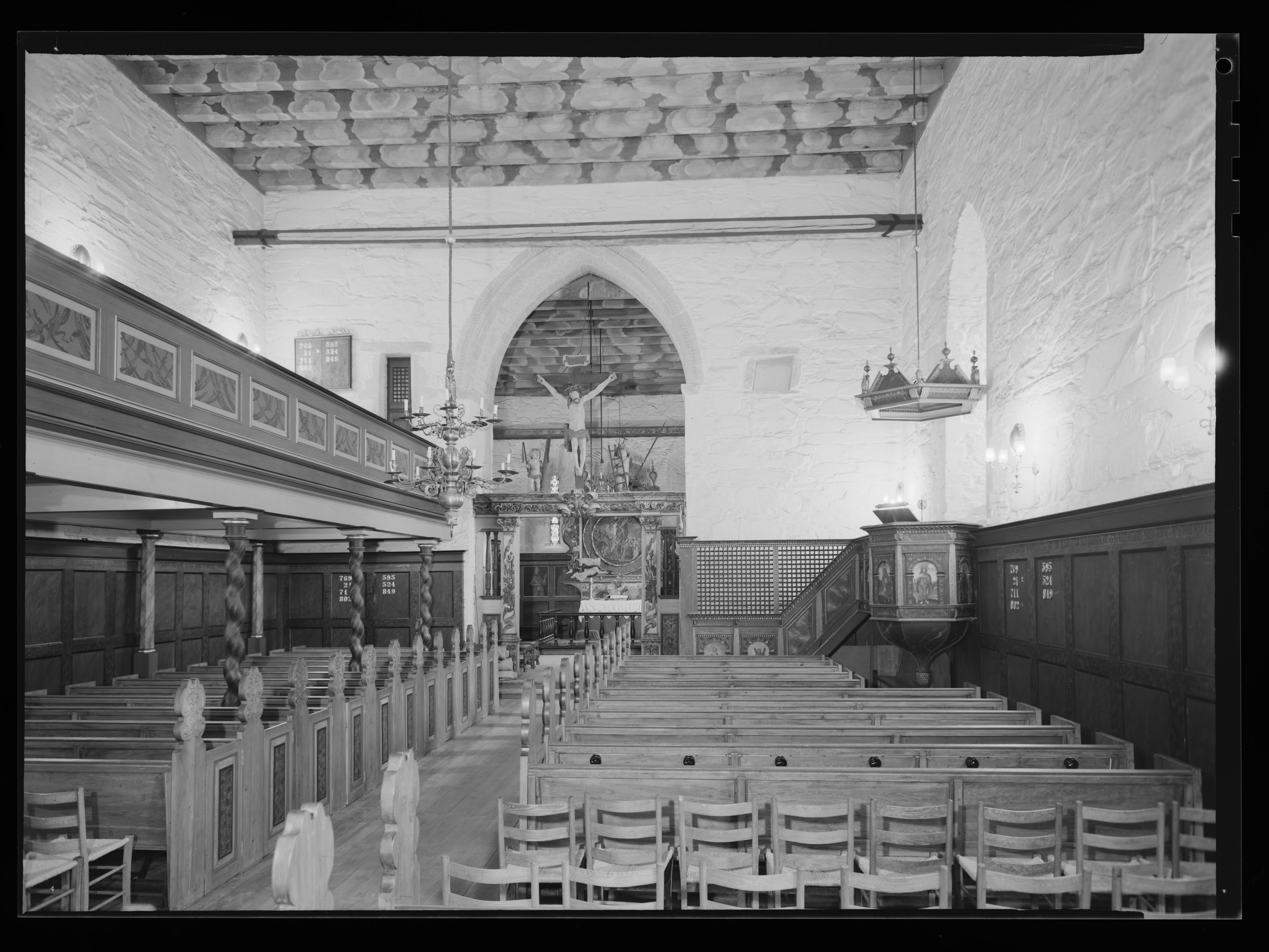

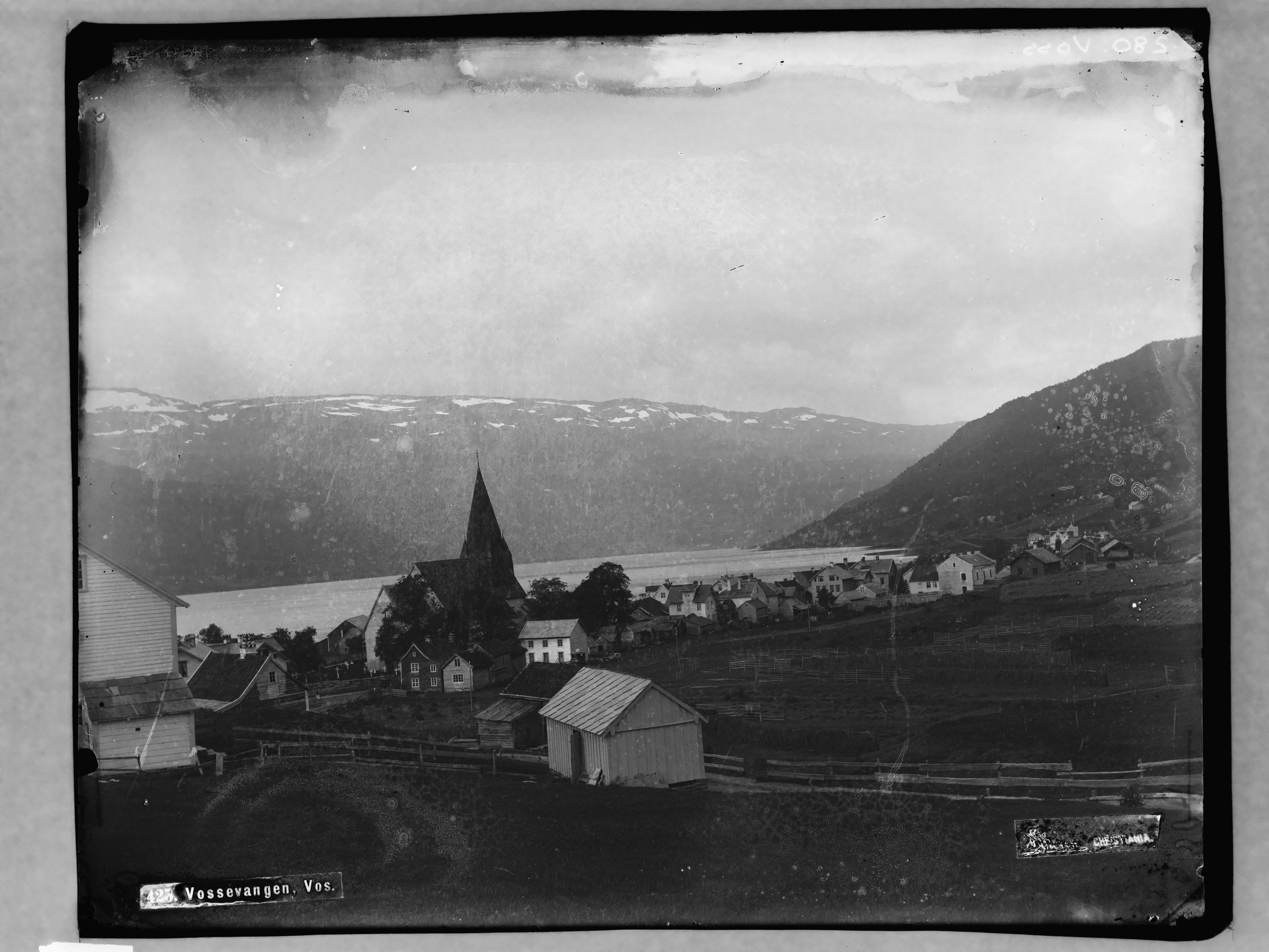

== See also ==
- List of churches in Bjørgvin
