= Oppheim Church =

Church in Vestland, Norway

- Oppheim kyrkje
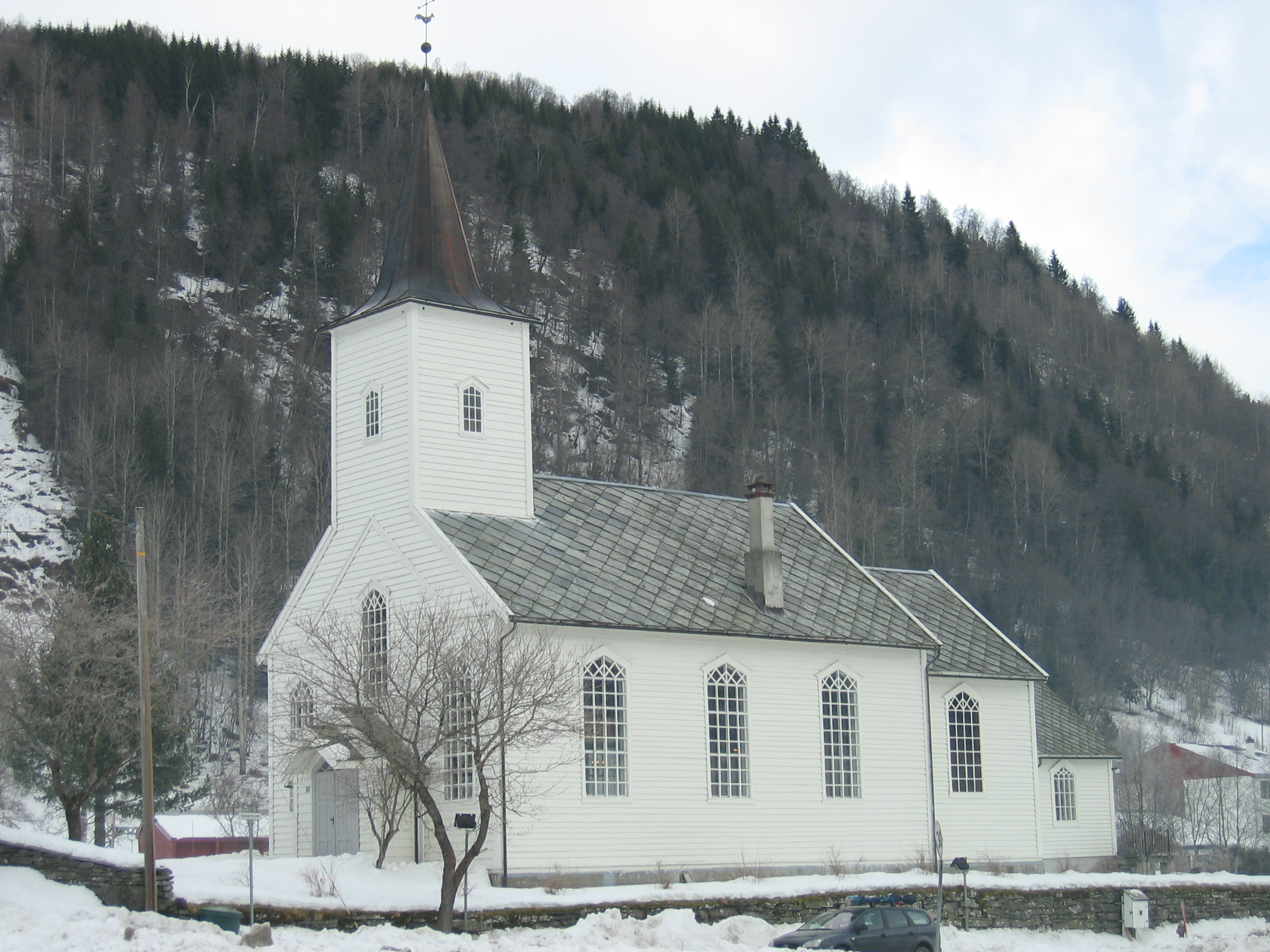
- View of the church
- Oppheim Church
- 60°47′34″N 6°34′31″E
- Location: Voss, Vestland
- Country: Norway
- Denomination: Church of Norway
- Previous denomination: Catholic Church
- Churchmanship: Evangelical Lutheran

History
- Former name: Uppheim kyrkje
- Status: Parish church
- Founded: 13th century
- Consecrated: 1871

Architecture
- Functional status: Active
- Architect: Ole Vangberg
- Architectural type: Long church
- Completed: 1871 (155 years ago)

Specifications
- Capacity: 250
- Materials: Wood

Administration
- Diocese: Bjørgvin bispedømme
- Deanery: Hardanger og Voss prosti
- Parish: Oppheim
- Norwegian Cultural Heritage Site
- Type: Church
- Status: Listed
- ID: 85227

Oppheim Church (Norwegian: Oppheim kyrkje) is a parish church of the Church of Norway in Voss Municipality in Vestland county, Norway. It is located in the village of Oppheim, located on the northern shore of the lake Oppheimsvatnet. It is the church for the Oppheim parish which is part of the Hardanger og Voss prosti (deanery) in the Diocese of Bjørgvin. The white, wooden church was built in a long church design in 1871 using plans drawn up by the architect Ole Vangberg. The church seats about 250 people.

== History ==
The earliest existing historical records of the church date back to the year 1329, but it was built before that time. The first church was a wooden stave church that was likely built during the 13th century. It was located about 200 metres (660 ft) northwest of the present site by the lake Oppheimsvatnet. Little is known about that church and it was torn down in 1673. A new log church was constructed from 1673-1676 on the same site. An oral tradition says that it was built by Ole Botolvsen Sunde. The new church was a long church with a chancel in the east and a tower in the west. The nave measured about 10.7 by 8.8 metres (35 ft × 29 ft) and the choir measured about 5.6 by 5.6 metres (18 ft × 18 ft).

The parish hired Ole Vangberg to design the new church who used the same plans that were used for the nearby Vinje Church. Jon Alver was hired to lead the construction. From May to October 1871, a new church was built about 200 metres (660 ft) to the southeast, on the shore of the lake Oppheimsvatnet. The present church in the new location was consecrated on 4 October 1871 by the local Dean Irgens. After the new church was completed, the old church was torn down. The old cemetery by the old church was in use until 1875 when the new cemetery surrounding the new church was put into use.

== Media gallery ==
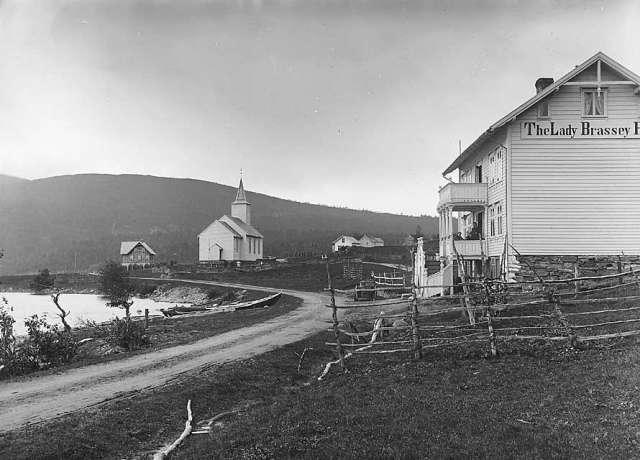

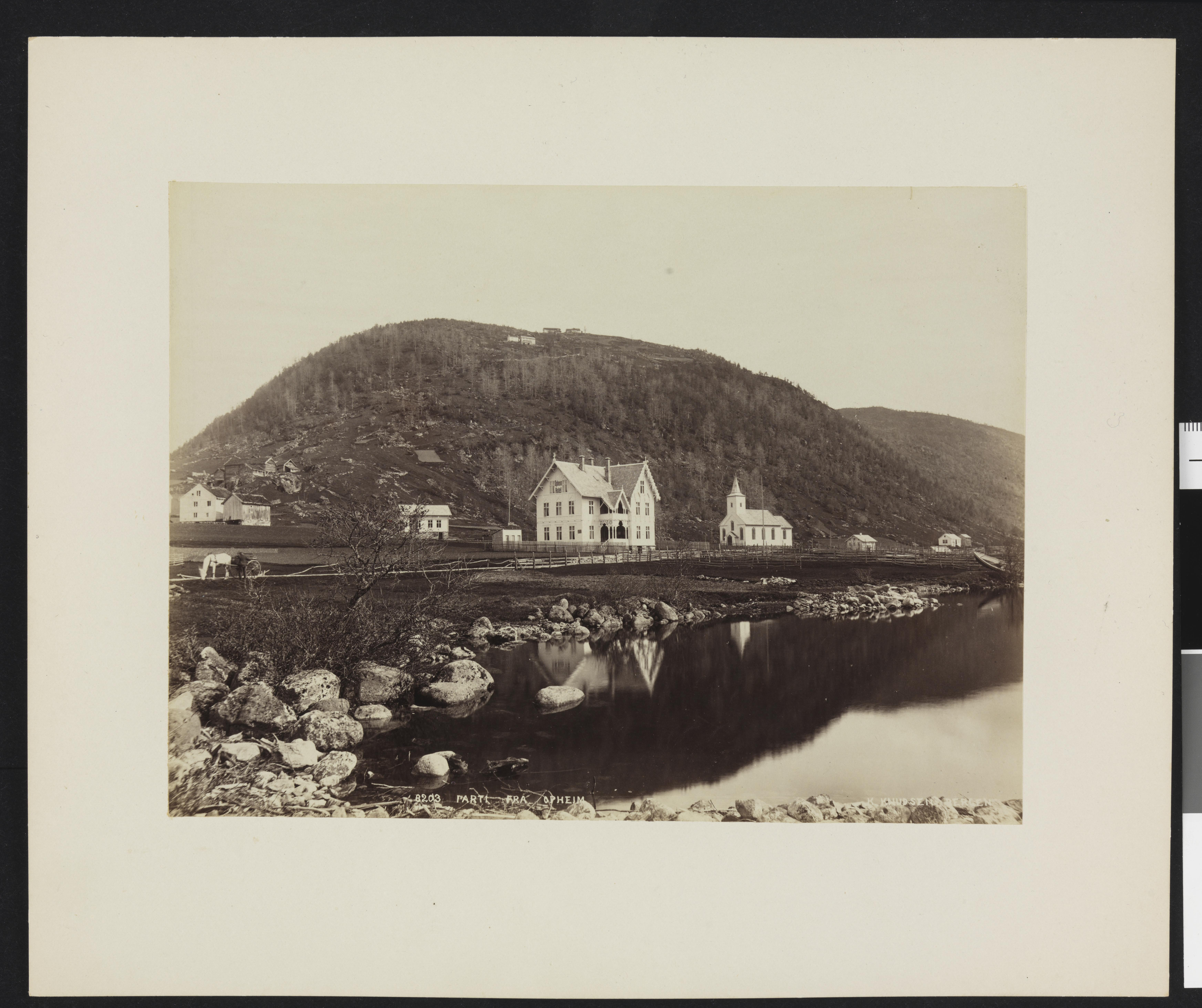

== See also ==
- List of churches in Bjørgvin
