= Oppheimsvatnet =

Lake in Voss, Norway

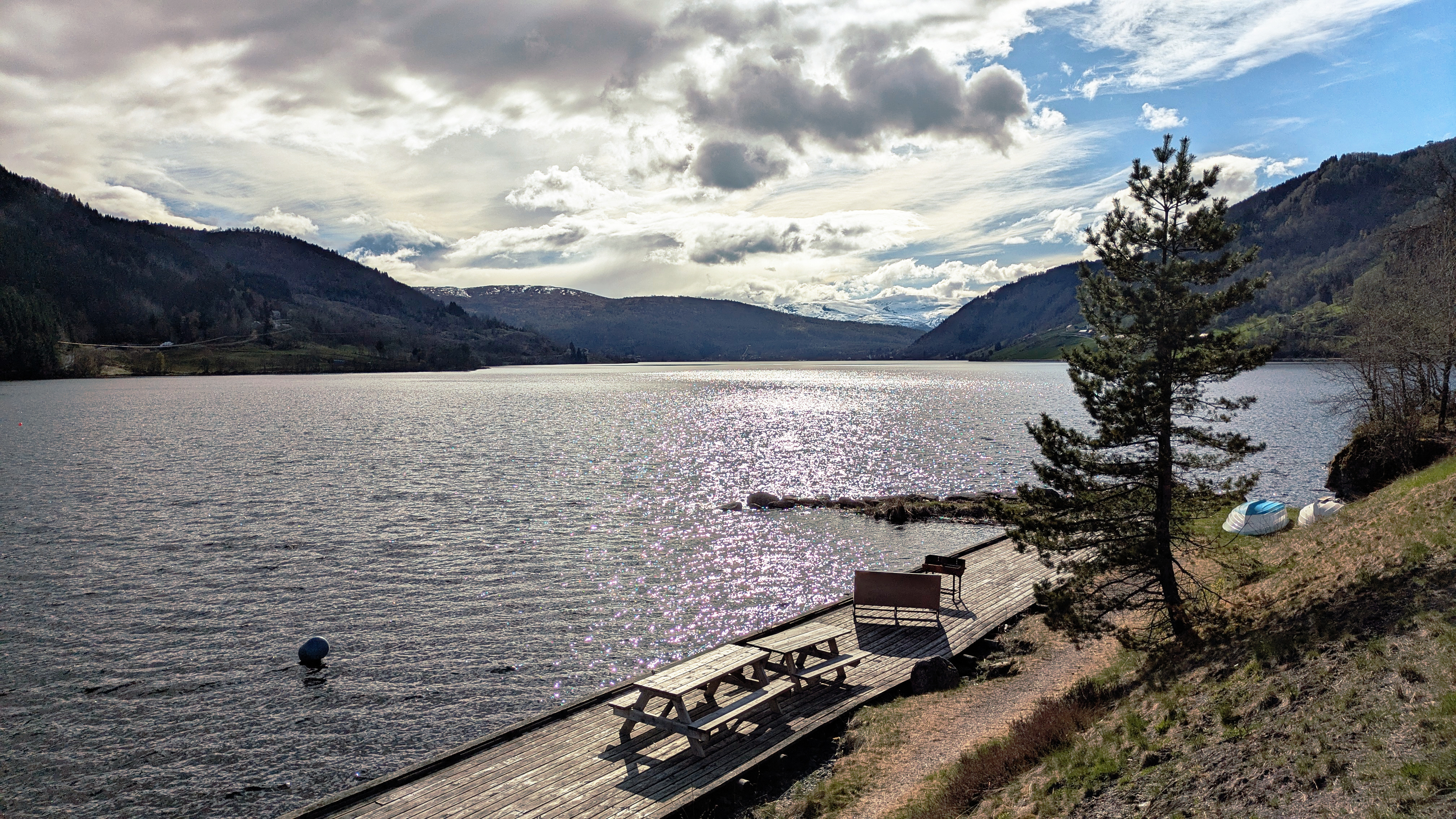
- View of the lake
- Interactive map of Oppheimsvatnet
- Location: Voss Municipality, Vestland
- Coordinates: 60.7954°N 6.6000°E
- Basin countries: Norway
- Max. length: 5 kilometres (3.1 mi)
- Max. width: 1 kilometre (0.62 mi)
- Surface area: 3.55 km^{2} (1.37 sq mi)
- Shore length^{1}: 10.52 kilometres (6.54 mi)
- Surface elevation: 337 metres (1,106 ft)
- References: NVE
- ^{1} Shore length is not a well-defined measure.

Oppheimsvatnet is a lake in Voss Municipality in Vestland county, Norway. The 3.55-square-kilometre (1.37 sq mi) lake lies in the northern part of the municipality, about 3 kilometres (1.9 mi) east of the village of Vinje. The European route E16 highway runs along the northern side of the lake, right past Oppheim Church which sits in the small village of Oppheim, after which the lake is named. The village of Vasstrondi lies on the southern shore.

== See also ==
- List of lakes in Norway
