= Vinje, Vestland =

Village in Voss Municipality, Norway

Vinje Nedre Vinjo
- Village
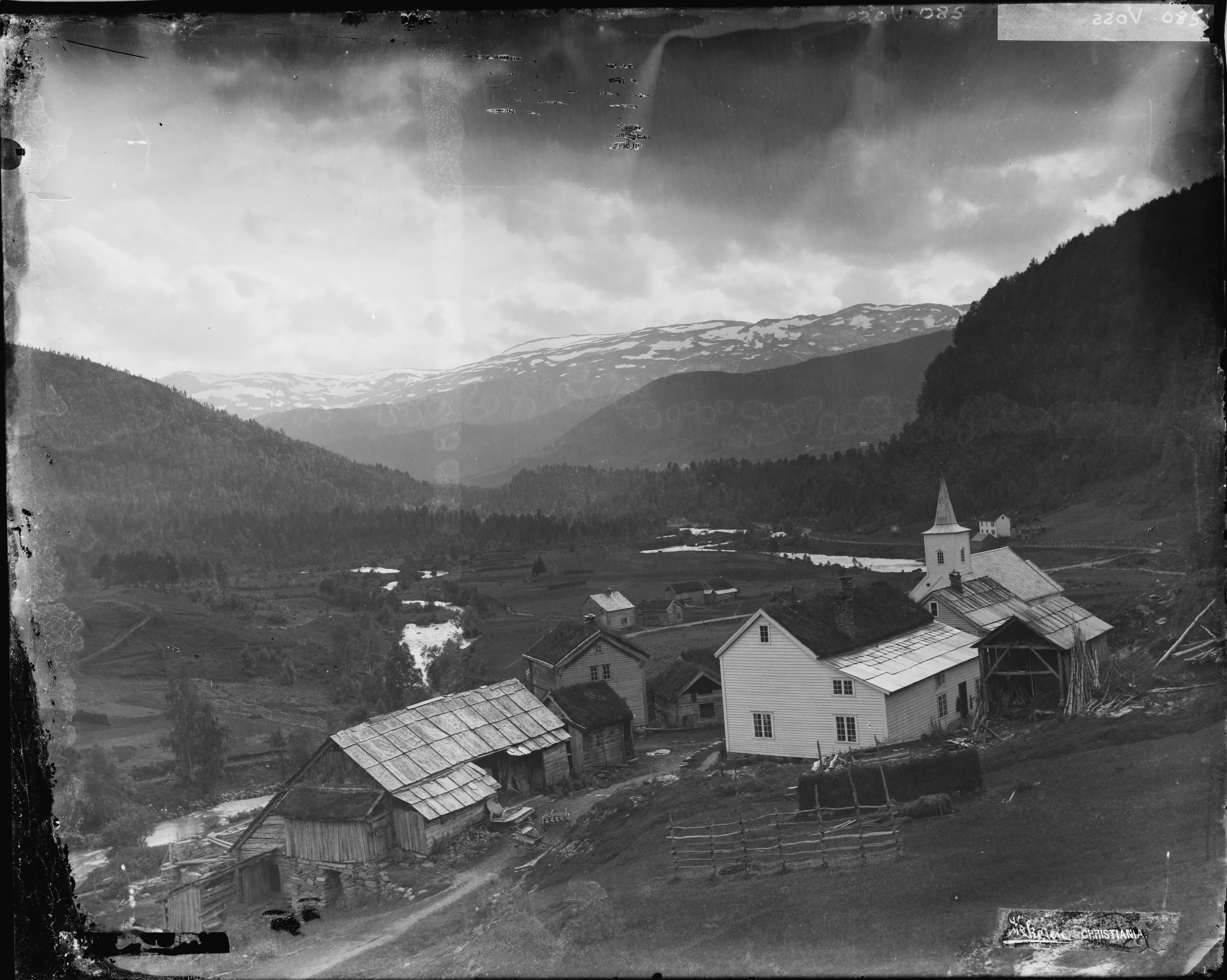
- View of the village
- Interactive map of Vinje
- Coordinates: 60.79185°N 6.50851°E
- Country: Norway
- Region: Western Norway
- County: Vestland
- District: Voss
- Municipality: Voss Municipality
- Elevation: 224 m (735 ft)
- Time zone: UTC+01:00 (CET)
  - Summer (DST): UTC+02:00 (CEST)
- Post Code: 5713 Vossestrand

Vinje is a village in Voss Municipality in Vestland county, Norway. The village is located at the confluence of two small rivers flowing out of the lakes Myrkdalsvatnet (to the northwest) and Oppheimsvatnet (to the east). The village also sits at the junction of Norwegian National Road 13 and the European route E16 highway. Vinje Church is located in the village, and there has been a church here since the Middle Ages.
