= Voss (traditional district) =

Traditional district in Norway

- District
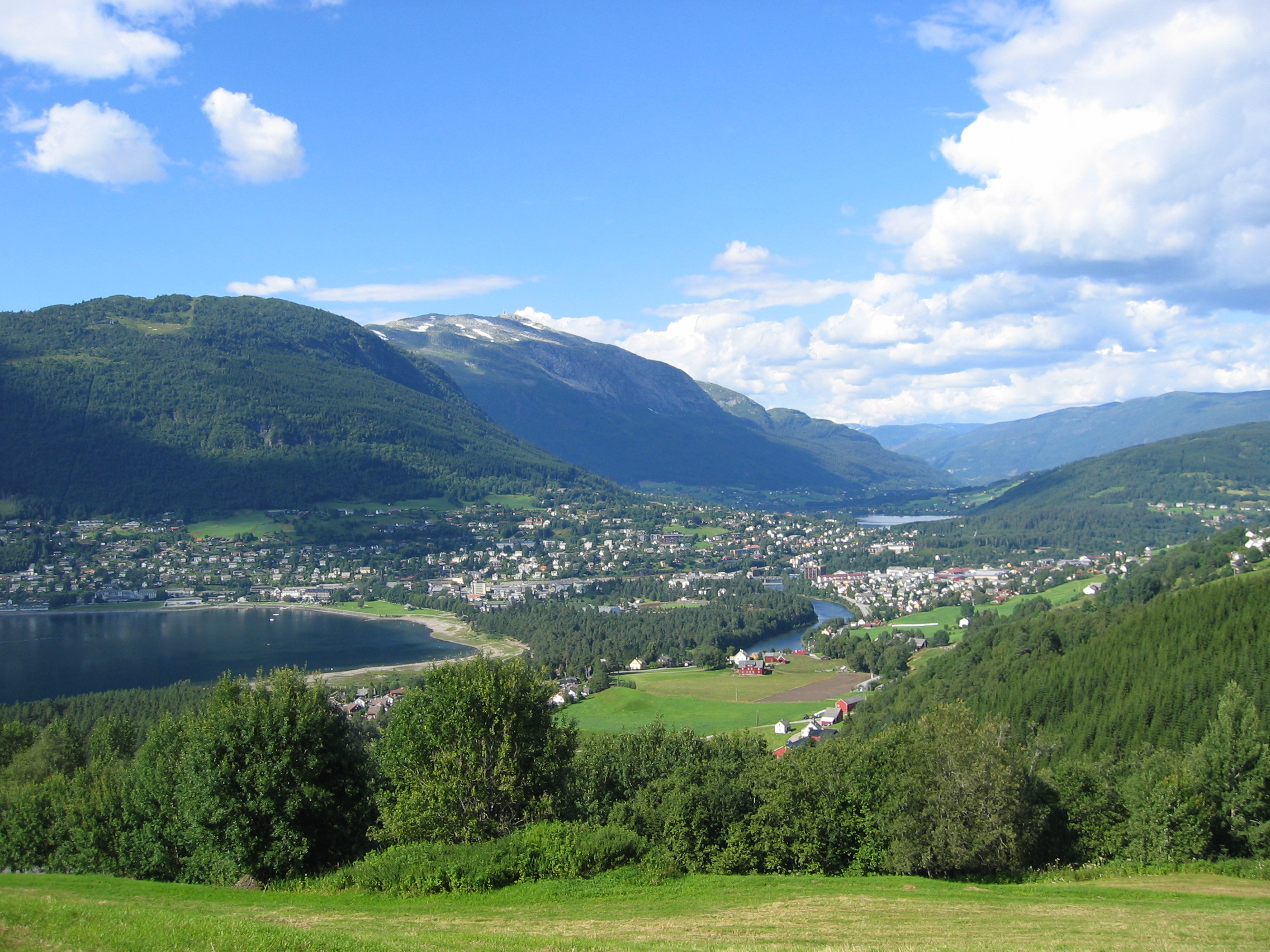
- View of Vossavangen

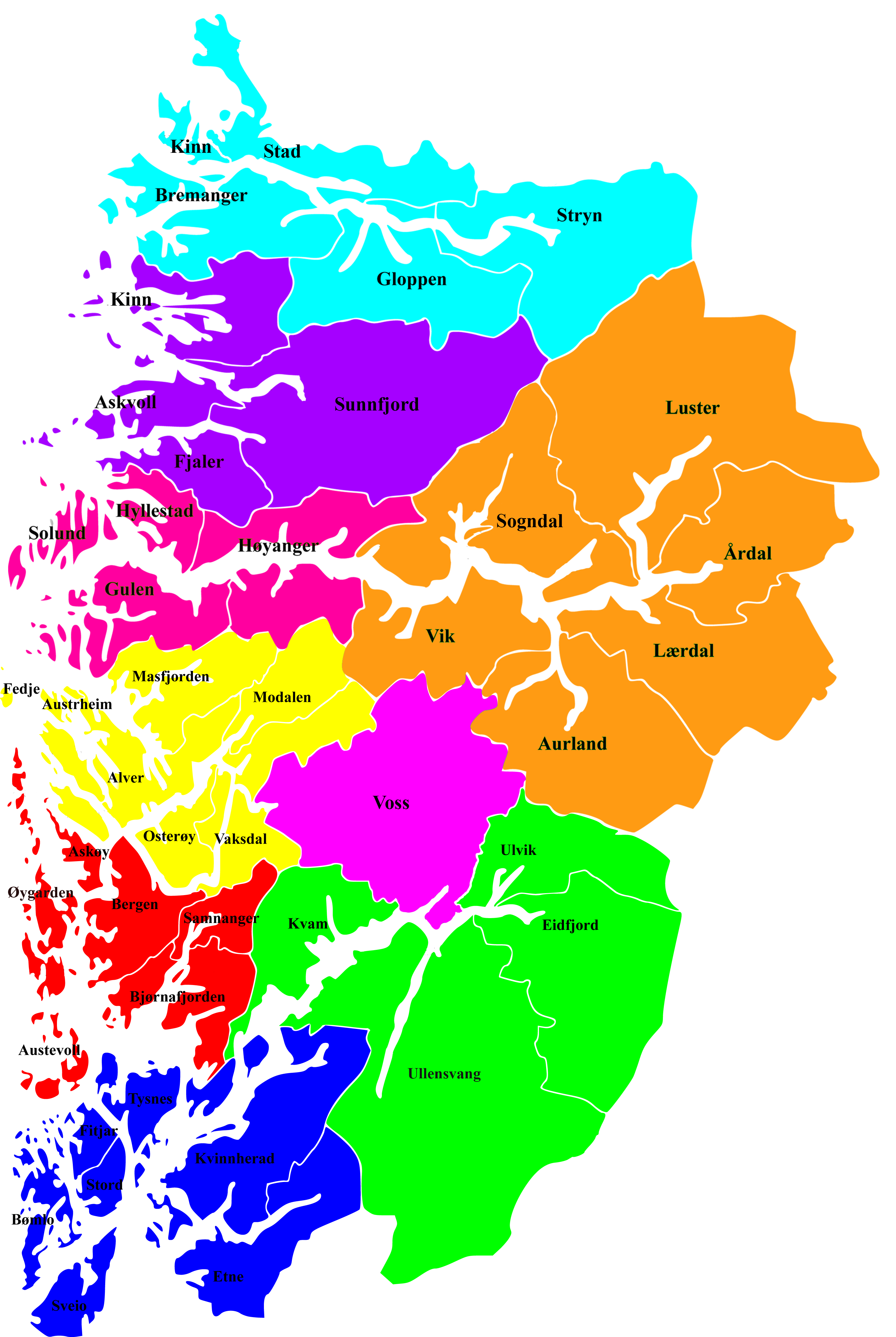
- Districts of Vestland: Nordfjord Sunnfjord Indre Sogn Ytre Sogn Nordhordland Midthordland Sunnhordland Hardanger Voss
- Coordinates: 60°40′N 6°29′E
- Country: Norway
- County: Vestland
- Region: Western Norway
- Largest settlement: Vossavangen

Area
  - Total: 1,806 km^{2} (697 sq mi)

Population (2016)
  - Total: 14,425
  - Density: 7.987/km^{2} (20.69/sq mi)
- Demonym: Vossing

Voss is a traditional district in Vestland county, Norway. The region is dominated by valleys, mountains, and lakes, located between the Sognefjord and Hardangerfjord and east of the city of Bergen. The district consists of Voss Municipality since 1964 (prior to that time it included Voss Municipality, Vossestrand Municipality, and Evanger Municipality). The largest settlement in the district is Vossavangen.

== History ==
Many valuable grave finds have been made in the Voss area. In the High Middle Ages, Voss and the surrounding country formed a separate petty kingdom Vǫrsaveldi(“Vossaveldet”), which stretched from Sygnafylki to Osterøy. In the center was the village of Vossavangen where the large stone Voss Church was located. The church was built around 1270 in Gothic style, with furnishings and decorations from mainly the 17th century. East of the church is the Olavskrossen in memory of the Christianization of the people of Voss in 1023.

When tourism picked up at the end of the 19th century and the Stalheim hotel was built (1885), there was a lot of tourist traffic, which was "transported" by horse and buggy between Gudvangen and the bottom of Stalheim.

== Landscape ==
The bedrock in Voss belongs to the Caledonian orogeny, which consists of mica schists in the central areas around the lake Vangsvatnet and between the thrust sheets that cover the schist. Thrust sheets of gneiss, granite, and gabbro (anorthosite) form the highest parts of the municipality. The highest point is Olsskavlen at 1,576 metres (5,171 ft) above sea level. The mountain Blåfjell on the border with Vik Municipality in the north reaches 1,548 metres (5,079 ft) above sea level. The most famous mountain is Lønahorgi at 1,410 metres (4,630 ft) above sea level just north of Vossavangen.
