= List of railway stations in Norway =

List of railway stations located in Norway

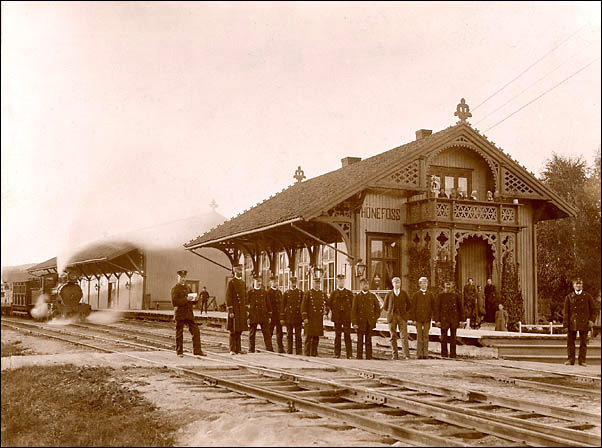
Hønefoss Station in 1900

This is the list of railway stations located in Norway. The list is incomplete.

Name	Location (county, parish)	Year of opening	Image
A
Arna Station	Vestland	1964	
B
Bryne Station	Rogaland	1878	
Bergen Station	Vestland	1913	
Bogegrend Station	Vestland	1938	
Bolstadøyri Station	Vestland	1883	
Bulken Station	Vestland	1883	
D
Dale Station	Vestland	1883	
Drammen Station	Buskerud	1866	
E
Egersund station	Rogaland	1944	
Eggjareid Station	Vestland	1936	
Elverum Station	Innlandet	1862	
Evanger Station	Vestland	1883	
F
Finse Station	Vestland	1908	
Flå Station	Viken	1907	
G
Geilo Station	Viken	1907	
Gjerdåker Station	Vestland	1941	
Gol Station	Buskerud	1907	
H
Hallingskeid Station	Vestland	1908	
Haugastøl Station	Viken	1908	
Hønefoss Station	Viken	1868	
J
Jørnevik Station	Vestland	1936	
K
Kløve Station	Vestland	1931	
Kronstad Station	Vestland	1913	
L
Ljosanbotn Station	Vestland	1948	
M
Marienborg Station	Trøndelag	1999	
Mjølfjell Station	Vestland	1908	
Mosjøen Station	Nordland	1940	
Myrdal Station	Vestland	1908	
N
Nesbyen Station	Viken	1907	
O
Oklungen Station	Vestfold og Telemark	1882	
Oslo Sentralstasjon	Oslo (county)	1987	
P
Porsgrunn Station	Vestfold og Telemark	1882	
R
Reimegrend Station	Vestland	1908	
Rise Station	Agder	1907	
S			
Stavanger Station	Rogaland	1878	
Sandnes sentrum Station	Rogaland	1992	
Seimsgrend Station	Vestland	1936	
Skiple Station	Vestland	1931	
Skoppum Station	Vestfold og Telemark	1881	
Stabekk Station	Viken	1884	
Stanghelle Station	Vestland	1883	
T
Takvam Station	Vestland	1966	
Torpo Station	Viken	1907	
Trengereid Station	Vestland	1883	
Trondheim Central Station	Trøndelag	1882	
U
Upsete Station	Vestland	1908	
Urdland Station	Vestland	1908	
Ustaoset Station	Viken	1912	
V
Vaksdal Station	Vestland	1883	
Vieren Station	Vestland	1948	
Volli Station	Vestland	1936	
Voss Station	Vestland	1883	
Y
Ygre Station	Vestland	1908	
Å
Ål Station	Viken	1907	
Ø
Ørneberget Station	Vestland	1958	
Øyeflaten Station	Vestland	1931	

== See also ==
- Rail transport in Norway
- History of rail transport in Norway
- List of discontinued railway stations in Norway
