= Norwegian County Road 5388 =

Road in Vestland, Norway

County Road 5388

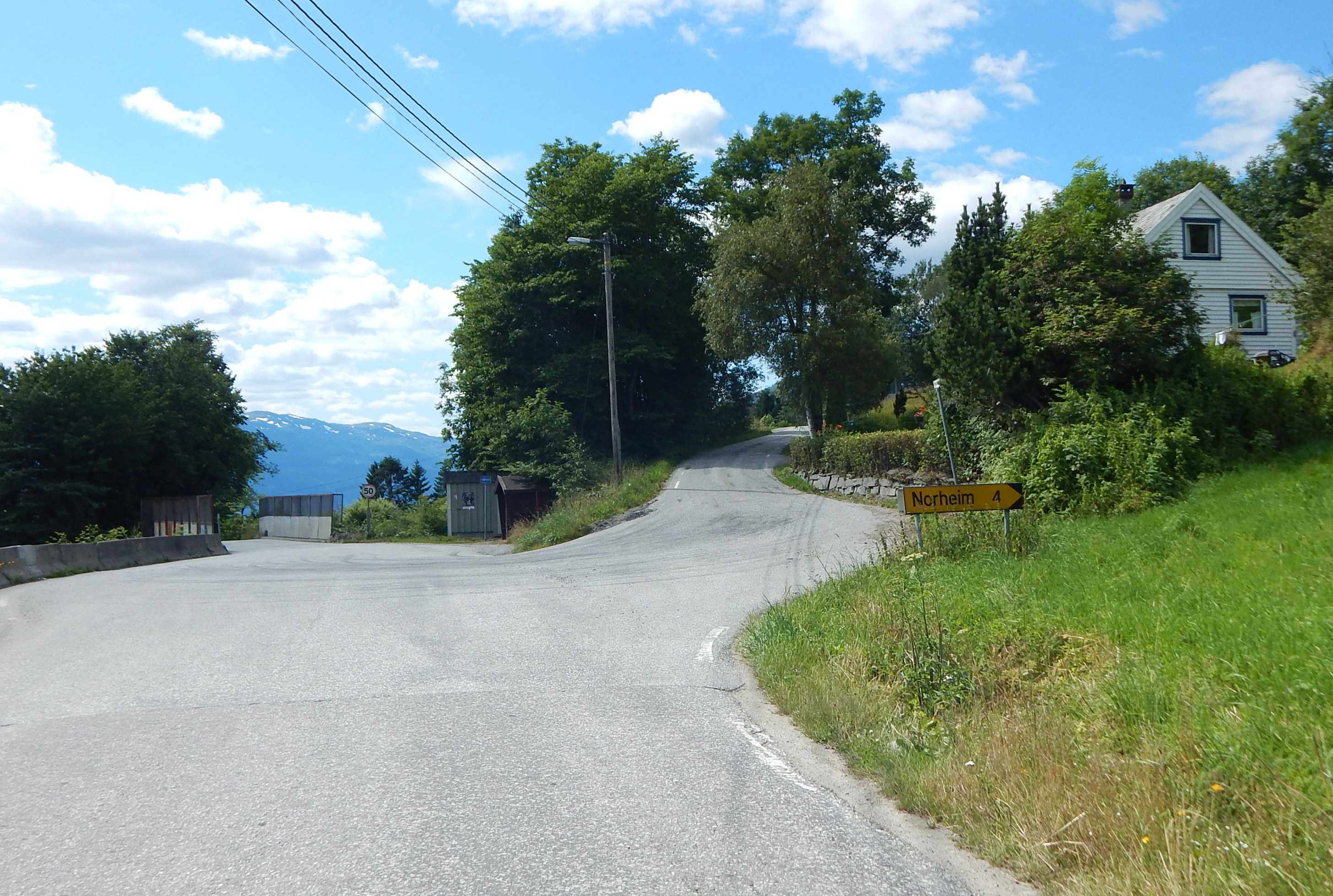
- County Road 5388 branches off from County Road 5386 just west of Ygre Station.

Route information
- Length: 6.3 km (3.9 mi)

Major junctions
- West end: Fv5386 at Ygre, Voss Municipality

- Fv5390 at Nordheim, Voss Municipality

- East end: Fv5386 at Klyve, Voss Municipality

Location
- Country: Norway
- Counties: Vestland

Highway system
- Roads in Norway; National Roads; County Roads

Norwegian County Road 5388 (Norwegian: Fylkesvei 5388) is a county road in Voss Municipality in Vestland county, Norway.

The road branches off from County Road 5386 just west of Ygre Station in the hamlet of Ygre and runs north past the Vinjo farm, through the Vinjo Valley (Vinjadalen), and to the hamlets of Nedra Kyte and Nordheim (also spelled Norheim), where there is a junction with County Road 5390. At Nordheim the road turns to the southeast and passes through the hamlet of Øvre Kyte before terminating at Klyve (also known as Kløve), where it rejoins County Road 5386.

The western part of the road is also known as Kytesvegen ('Kyte Road') after Nedra Kyte, and the eastern part is also known as Kløvshagane ('Kløve Pastures Road') after Klyve.

The road was re-numbered in 2019 because Hordaland and Sogn og Fjordane counties were scheduled to merge and there were county roads in both counties with the same number. This road previously was County Road 308.
