= Kløve Station =

Railway station in Voss, Norway

Kløve
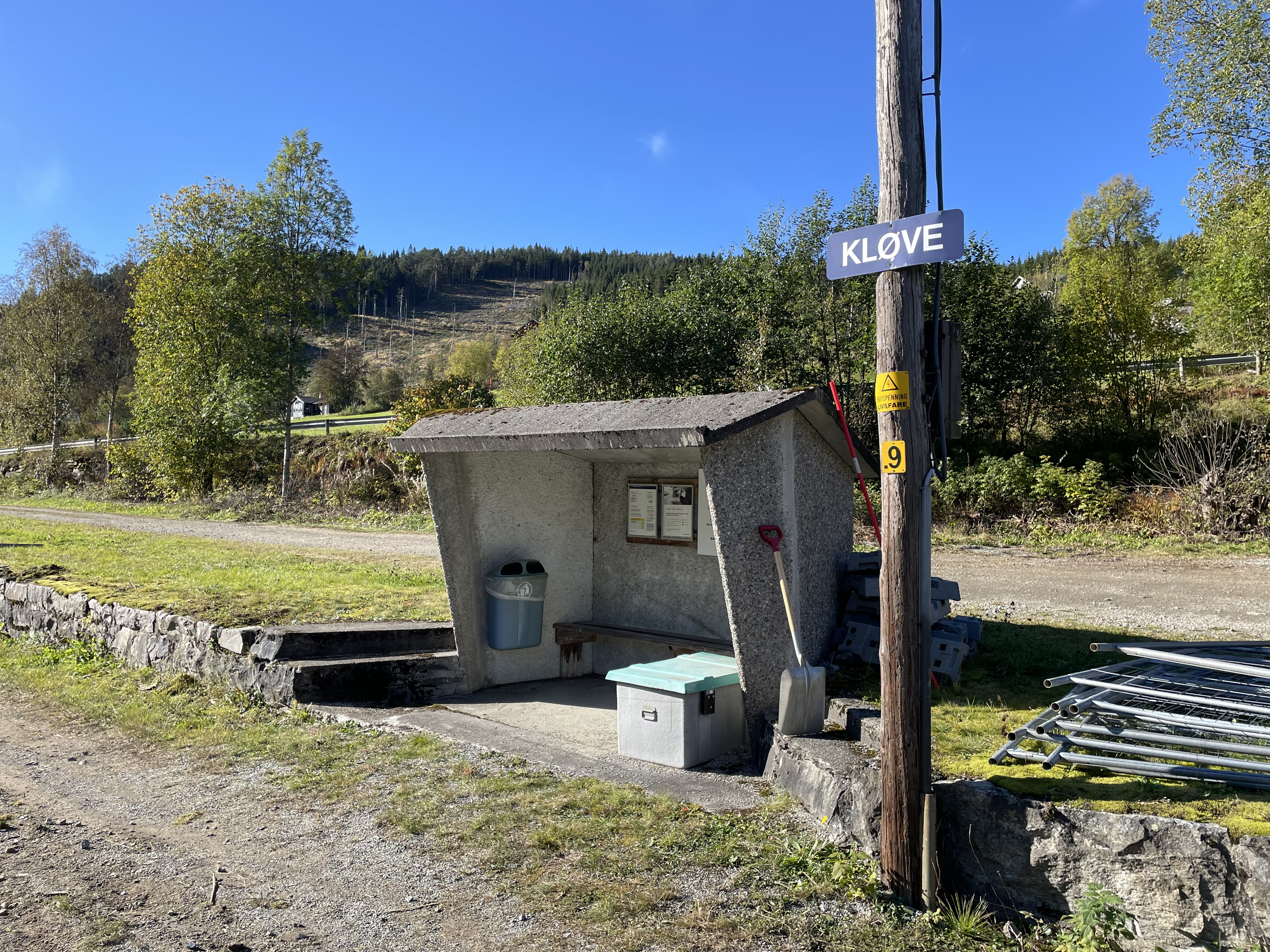

General information
- Location: Kløve, Voss Municipality; Norway
- Coordinates: 60.6633°N 6.535°E
- Owner: Bane NOR
- Operator: Vy Tog
- Line: Bergen Line
- Distance: 375.90 kilometres (233.57 mi)
- Platforms: 1

History
- Opened: 1931
Location

Kløve Station (Norwegian: Kløve holdeplass) is a railway station on the Bergen Line. It is located at Kløve in the western part of the Raundalen valley in Voss Municipality, Vestland county, Norway. The station is served by the Bergen Commuter Rail, operated by Vy Tog, with up to five daily departures in each direction. The station was opened in 1931.

Preceding station		Following station
Ygre	Bergen Line	Urdland
Preceding station	Local trains	Following station
Ygre	Bergen Commuter Rail	Urdland
