= Norwegian County Road 5386 =

Road in Vestland, Norway

County Road 5386

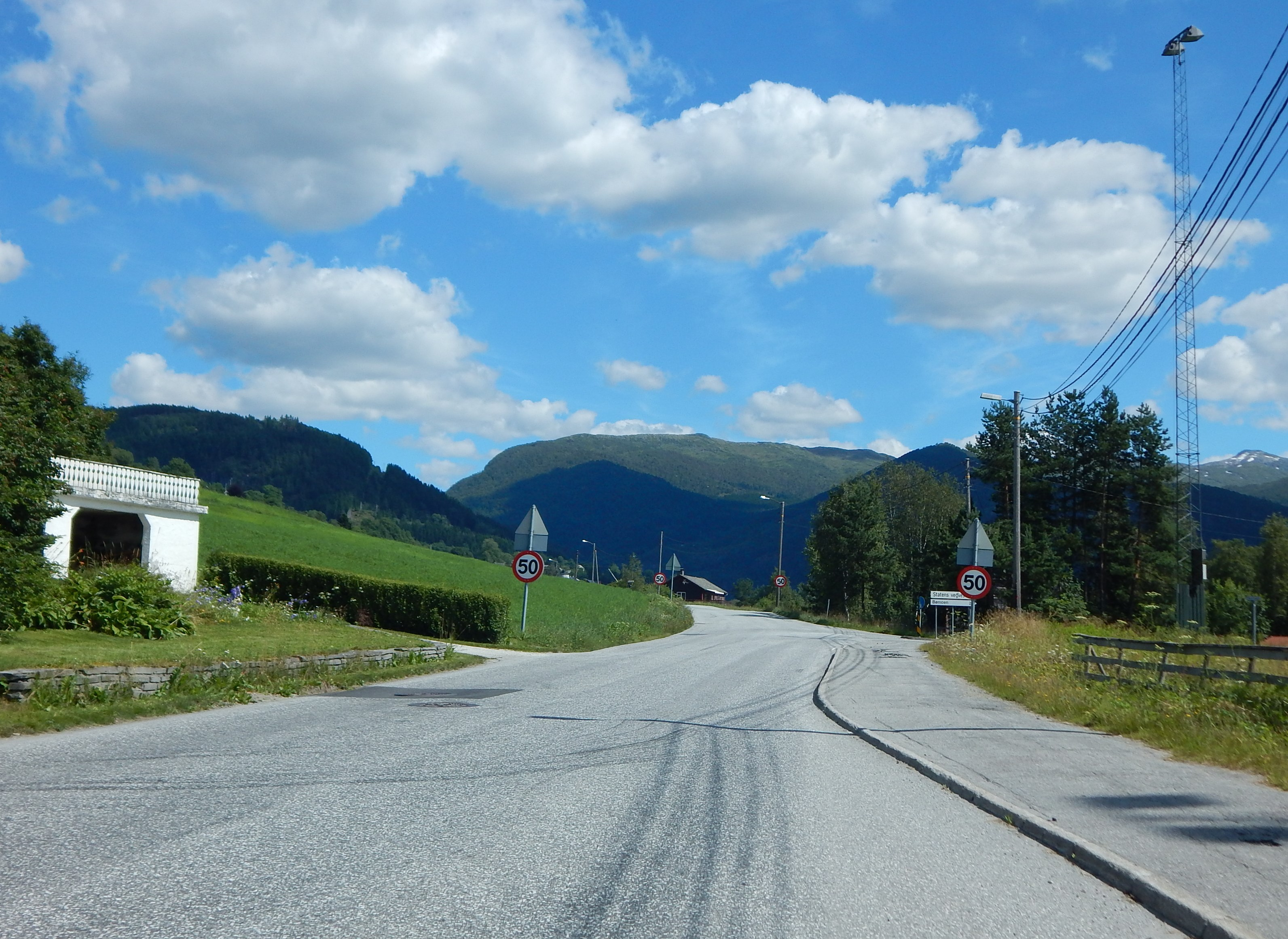
- County Road 5386 at Palmafossen

Route information
- Length: 37.9 km (23.5 mi)

Major junctions
- West end: Rv13 at Palmafossen, Voss Municipality
- Fv5388 at Ygre Fv5388 at Klyve
- East end: Mjølfjell, Voss Municipality

Location
- Country: Norway
- Counties: Vestland

Highway system
- Roads in Norway; National Roads; County Roads

Norwegian County Road 5386 (Norwegian: Fylkesvei 5386) is a county road in Voss Municipality in Vestland county, Norway.

The road branches off from National Road 13 at Palmafossen, just east of the village of Vossevangen, and it runs parallel to the Bergen Line until it terminates at the Mjølfjell Mountain Lodge and Youth Hostel (Mjølfjell Ungdomsherberge) in Mjølfjell. At Ygre, County Road 5388 branches off to the hamlets of Nedra Kyte, Nordheim (also known as Norheim), and Øvre Kyte before circling back to rejoin County Road 5386 at Klyve (also known as Kløve). The route is 37.9 kilometers (23.5 mi) long, including spurs to Voss Airport, Reimegrend Station, and Mjølfjell Station.

The westernmost part of the road is also known as Tjukkebygdevegen ('Tjukkebygdi Road') after the village of Tjukkebygdi, and the remainder is also known as Raundalsvegen ('Raun Valley Road') after the Raundalen valley.

The road was re-numbered in 2019 because Hordaland and Sogn og Fjordane counties were scheduled to merge and there were county roads in both counties with the same number. This road previously was County Road 307.
