= Nesbyen =

Settlement in Nesbyen Municipality, Norway

Coordinates: 60°34′N 9°06′E

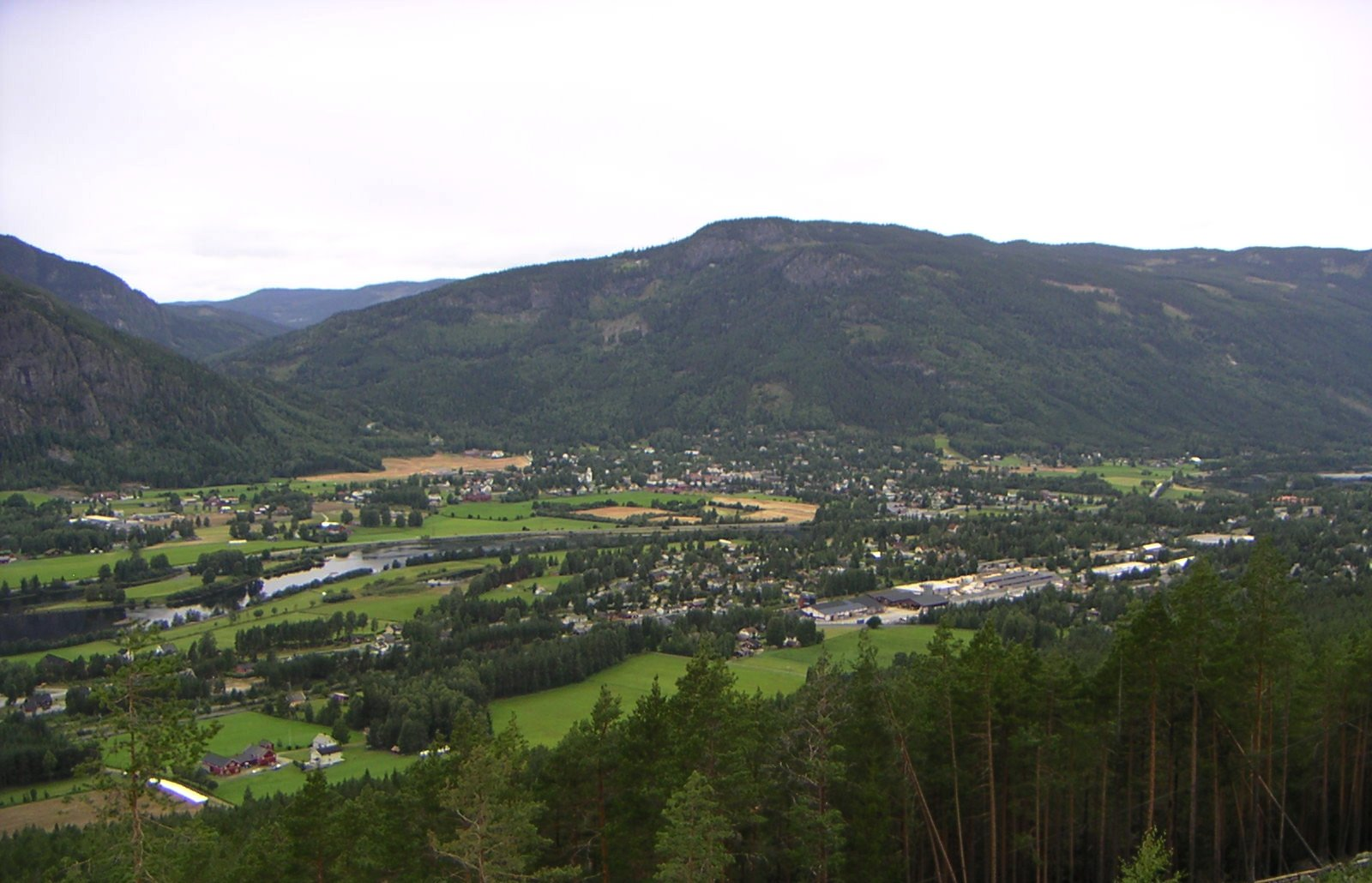
Nesbyen

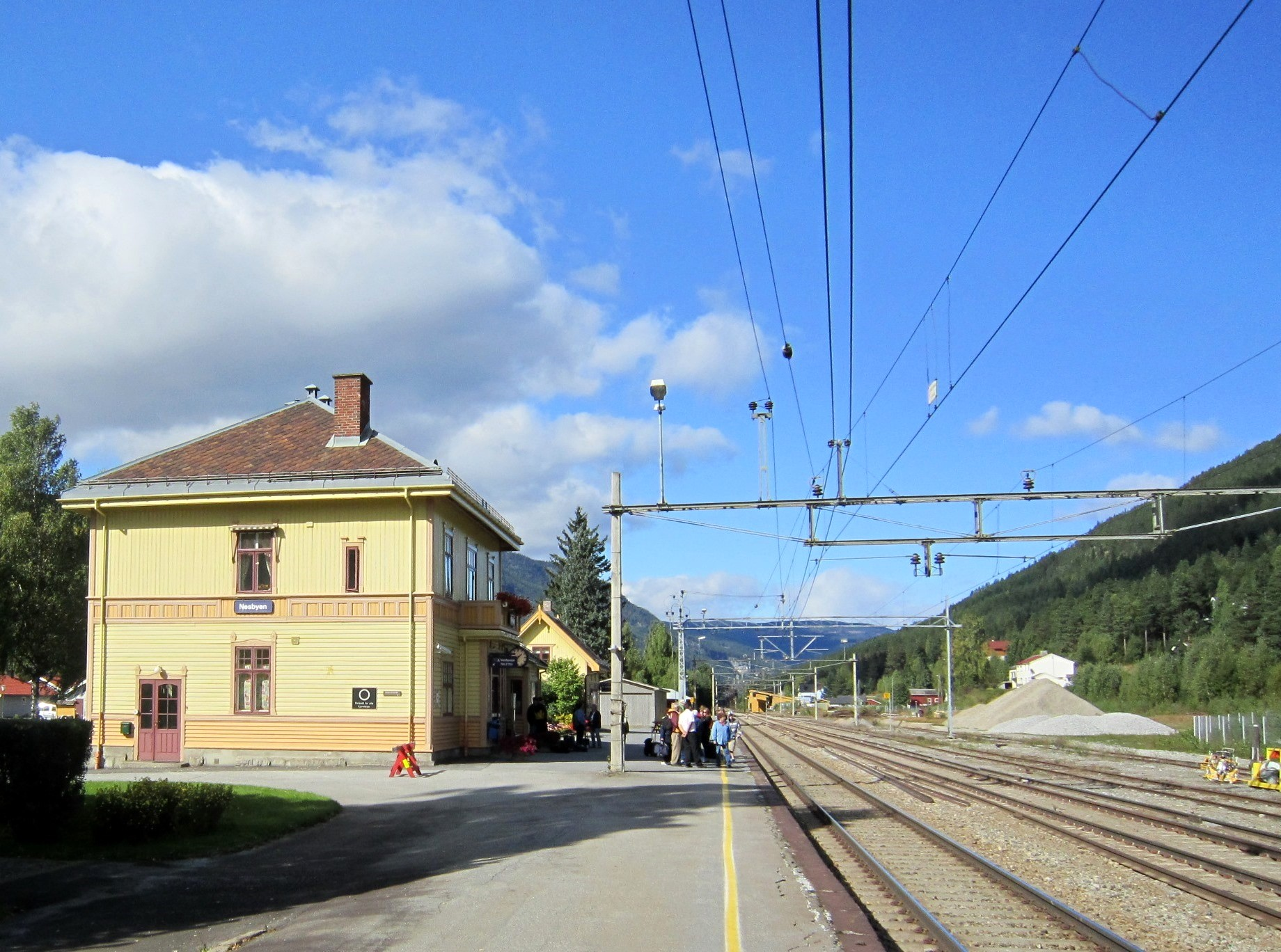
Nesbyen Station

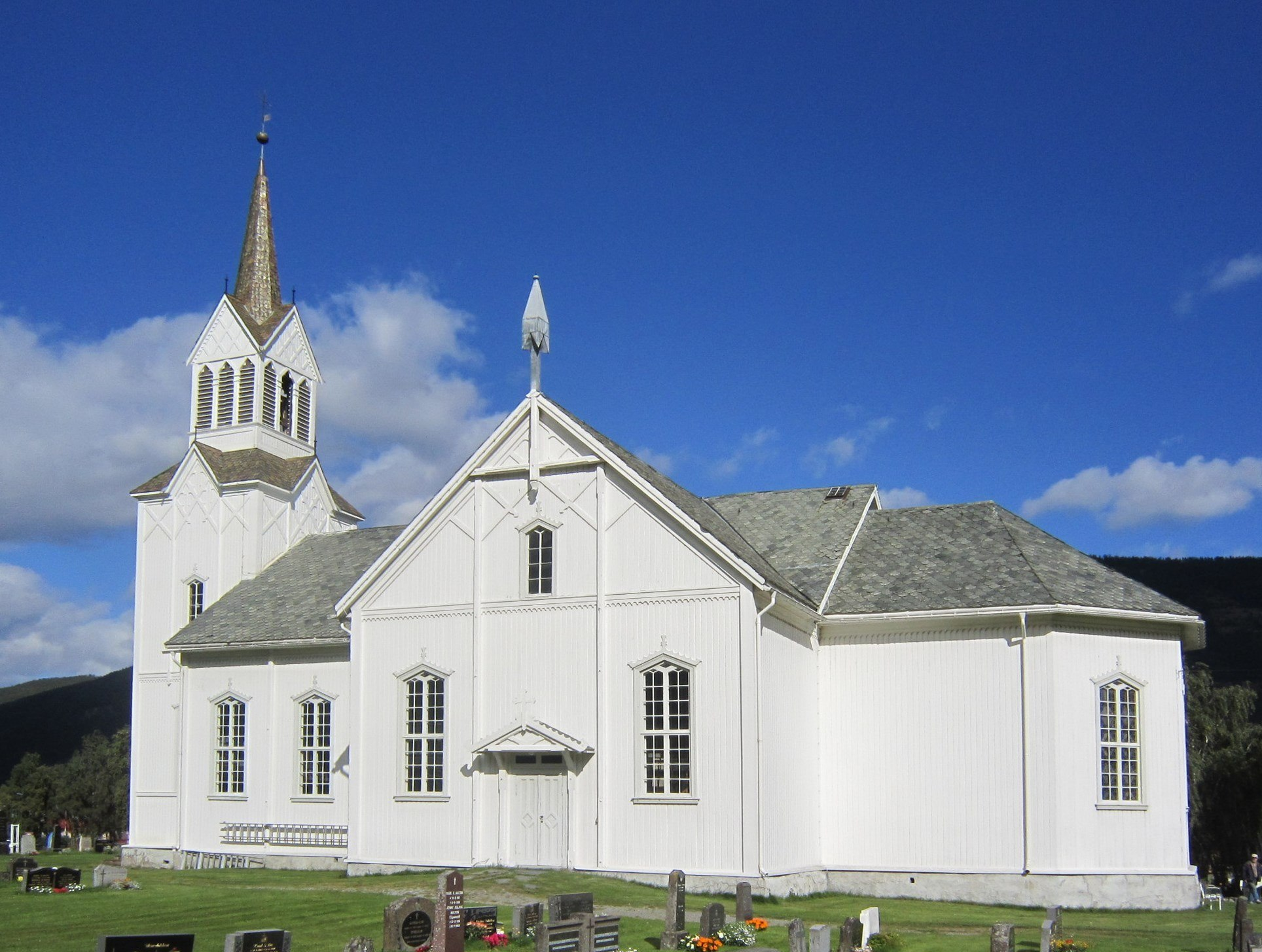
Nes Church in Hallingdal

Nesbyen is a town and the administrative center in Nesbyen municipality in the county of Buskerud, Norway. It is located in the traditional district of Hallingdal.

== Summary ==
Having a population of about 3,500 inhabitants, Nesbyen is located on Norwegian National Road 7 and the Bergen Line railroad which runs between Oslo and Bergen. Nesbyen Station was opened in 1907 when the Bergen Railway was opened to Gulsvik.

Gamle Nes is the oldest part of the town and most buildings in Gamle Nes date to before 1900. Nesbyen was an early administrative center for Hallingdal. Most of Nesbyen is surrounded by mountains on several sides, with good roads to most mountain areas. Hallingnatten is the municipality's highest point, 1,314 meters above sea level. Hallingdal Museum, founded in 1899 and one of the oldest open-air museums in Norway, is stationed in Nesbyen. The Hallingdal Museum organization has professional, administrative, and operational responsibility for the museums in Hallingdal.

Nesbyen is listed as the location with the highest recorded temperature in Norway, with a record of 35.6 °C (96.1 °F) set on 20 June 1970.

Nes kraftverk is a hydroelectric power station 4 km north of Nesbyen. The power plant was commissioned in 1967 and takes advantage of a drop of 285 meters from the Strandefjorden. It has four Francis turbines of 70 MW each and is the largest and lowest power plant in the Hallingdal River watershed (Hallingdalsvassdraget). The normal annual production is about 1330 GWh. Besides intake from Strandefjorden, water is taken from the rivers Ridola, Lya, and Votna. Water is also transferred from the river Rukkedøla through a separate tunnel. The power plant is owned and operated by E-CO Energi.

Nes Church in Hallingdal (Nes kirke i Hallingdal) was constructed during 1861 and was designed by architect Georg Andreas Bull. The church has 500 seats and was constructed of timber on a foundation of natural stone. Nes Chapel (Nes kapell) at Nes Cemetery was built in 1953–54, and was made as an imitation of the Nes Stave Church, which was demolished almost a hundred years earlier.

== See also ==
- Gardnos crater
