= Ygre =

Village in Voss Municipality, Norway

- Village
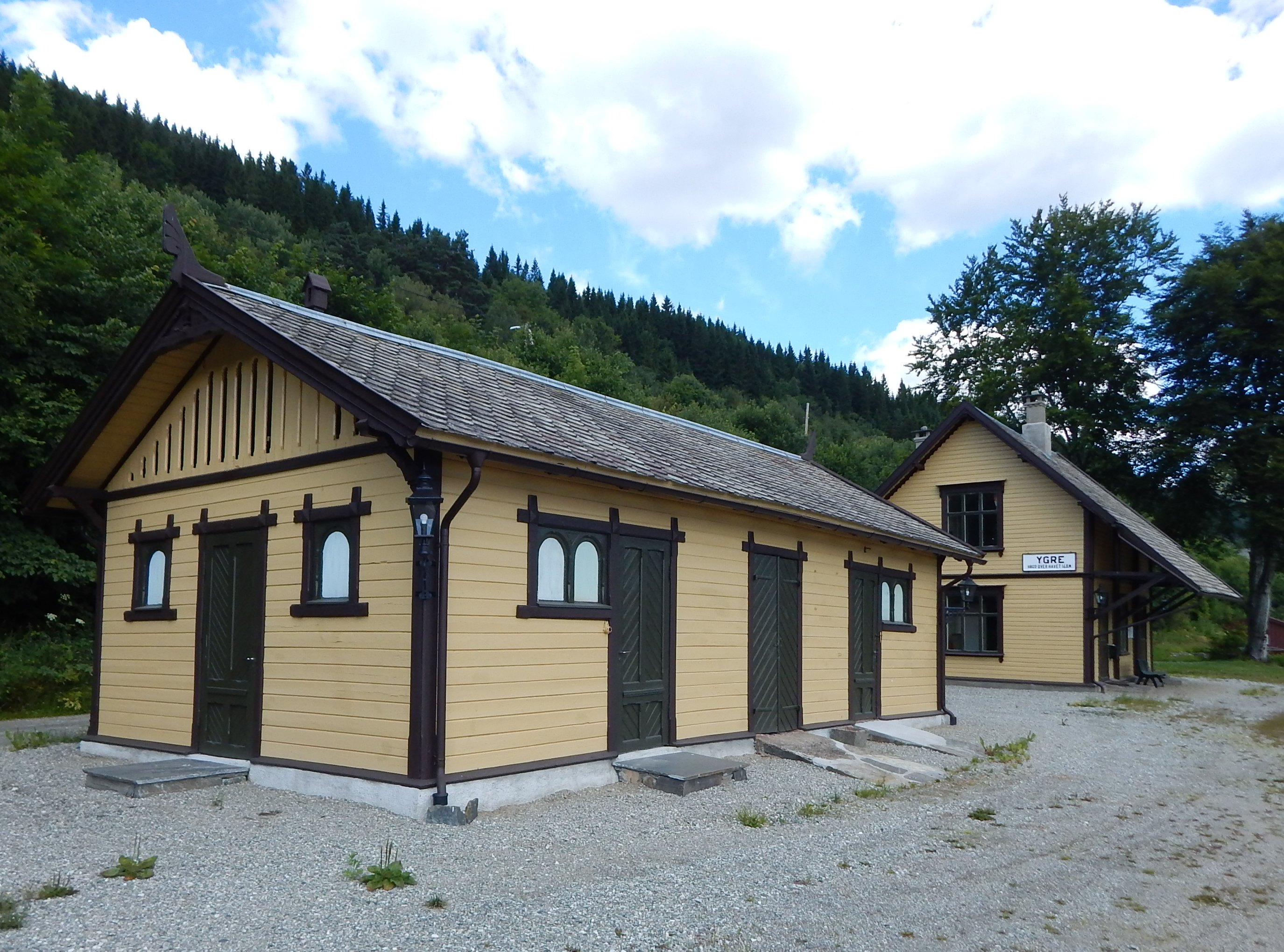
- Ygre Station in Ygre
- Interactive map of Ygre
- Coordinates: 60.64364°N 6.50252°E
- Country: Norway
- Region: Western Norway
- County: Vestland
- District: Voss
- Municipality: Voss Municipality
- Elevation: 152 m (499 ft)
- Time zone: UTC+01:00 (CET)
  - Summer (DST): UTC+02:00 (CEST)
- Post Code: 5700 Voss

Ygre is a village in Voss Municipality in Vestland county, Norway. Ygre lies about 5 kilometers (3.1 mi) northeast of Vossavangen, the seat of the municipality, along the Bergen Line and Norwegian County Road 5386.

Ygre Station is located in the village, and it is the location of the short Ygre Tunnel (Norwegian: Ygrestunnelen), which is about 50 meters (160 ft) long. Norwegian County Road 5388 branches off to the north at Ygre to the villages of Nedra Kyte, Nordheim, and Øvre Kyte.
