= Ekstremsportveko =

Annual sports event in Voss, Norway

Ekstremsportveko (Extreme Sports Week), or "Veko" as it is commonly called by the locals, is a festival held annually in Voss Municipality, Norway. Established in 1998 by Einar Raa Nilsen, Frode Solbakk, Øyvind Kindem and Even Rokne, has grown to become the world's largest extreme sports festival. In 2017, head of Ekstremsportveko is Kjetil Kriken.

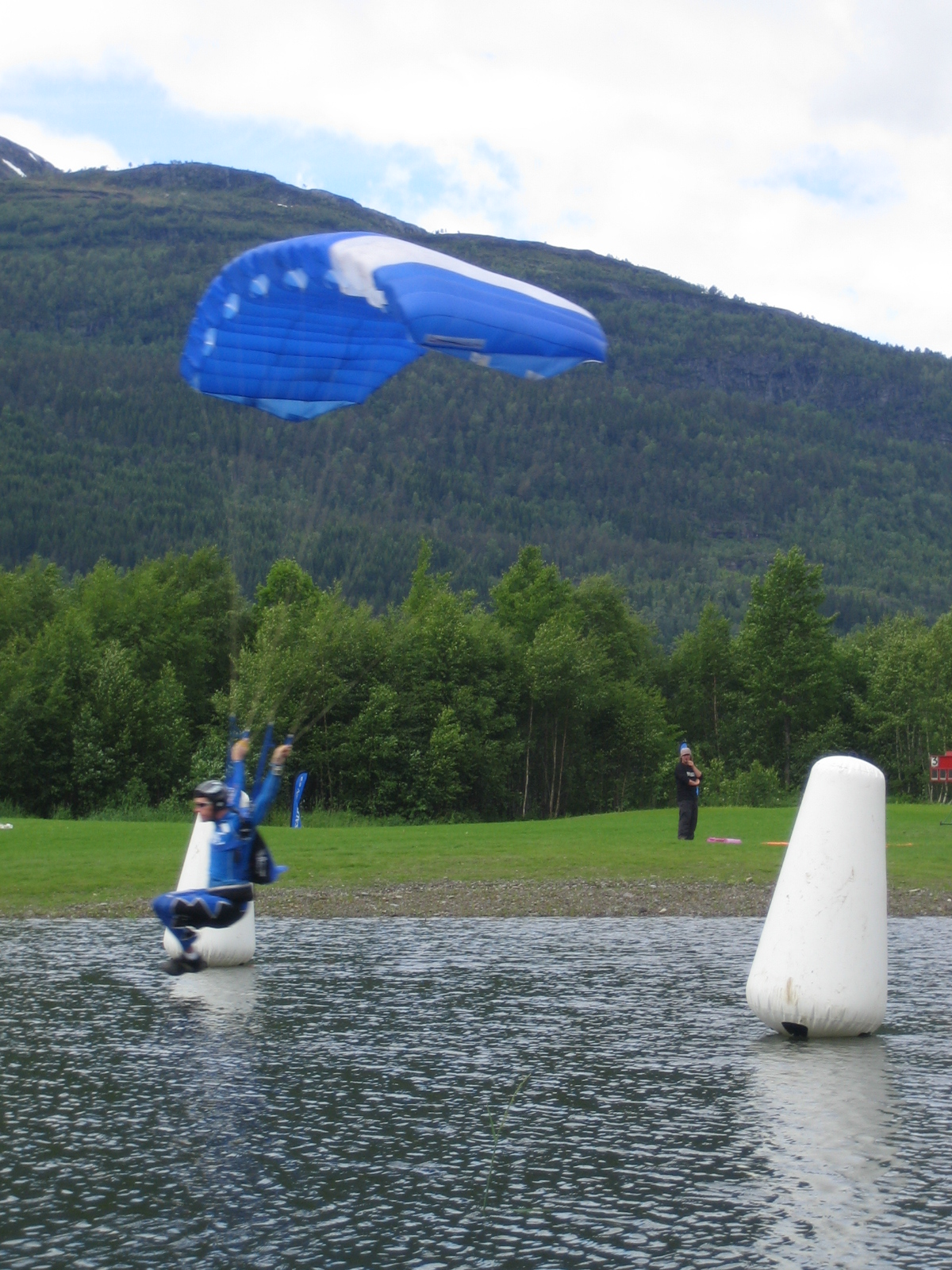
Parachuter at Ekstremsportveko 2005

== Disciplines ==
The week contains national and international competitions in disciplines such as BASE jumping, parachuting, paragliding, hanggliding, kitesurfing, climbing, longboarding, mountainbike, BMX, rafting, whitewater kayaking, and big air. The multisport race "Horgi Ned" includes skiing, biking and kayaking.

== History ==
In 2007 more than 1000 competitors and more than 40,000 spectators attended the event. The festival was covered by more than 250 reporters from both the Norwegian media as well as the international media. "Veko" does not employ many people as they base the organizing and execution of the event mostly on volunteers. In 2007 more than 600 volunteers assisted in getting the festival running smoothly. In 2007 "Veko" received two rewards. One reward was "Best sponsor object of the year". The Norwegian Sponsor and Event association gave the prize to Ekstremsportveko stating; "Ekstremsportveko has moved away from a focus on commercialism to pure focus on their own identity where the sponsors have a more intimate presence than what was the case earlier when the activity was mentioned by the name of the sponsor". The second was "The tourism prize of the year". Innovation Norway states "With this prize we wish to focus on the overall experience in the tourism industry. Ekstremsportveko is definitely a worthy winner," says the director of tourism, Per-Arne Tuftin from Innovation Norway.

== Development ==
As "Veko" has grown and become more and more popular, the organizers of the festival have also created a smaller winter version of the festival called Vinterveko (Winter week). This is an event that only lasts from Friday-Sunday and was first set up in 2007. The 2008 event is scheduled to take place 28–30 March. Karianne Finne, the chief organizer of the 2007 version of Vinterveko, says that Vinterveko shall remain a smaller winter version of "Veko" and they have no plans of making it into a full week festival.

In 2014 the Vinterveko was shut down to focus on the main festival, Ekstremsportveko.

Air-based activities operate out of Voss Airport, Bømoen.

== Culture ==
As well as being an extreme sport festival, "Veko" is also a music festival. In 2007 the festival included the national and international artists Beenie Man, Definition of Ill Sound System Show, "Delfinen", DJ Barabass, Hjalmar, Horace Andy & Dub Asante Band, Me First & The Gimme Gimmes, Mira Craig, Nico D with Admiral P and Daniel Lion of Manifest Sound, No Means No, Raggabalder Riddim Rebels, Sly & Robbie with Bitty McLean, Svenska Akademien, Theodor Babeuf and Valentourettes.

== Incidents ==
In 2012, an American parachute jumper died, crashing into the mountainside after jumping from a helicopter during Extremsportveko.

In 2021, at least 19 people from 9 different Norwegian municipalities were infected with SARS‑CoV‑2 during the Veko.
