= Voss Airport, Bømoen =

Voss Airport, Bømoen Voss flyplass, Bømoen
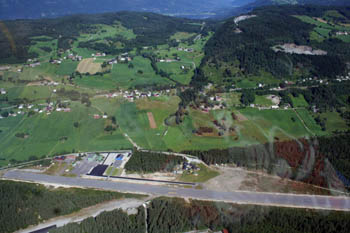
- IATA: none; ICAO: ENBM

Summary
- Airport type: Public
- Serves: Voss, Norway
- Location: Bømoen, Voss
- Elevation AMSL: 91 m / 300 ft
- Coordinates: 60°38′19″N 006°30′05″E

Map
- Location in Norway ENBM (Vestland)

Runways
Direction	Length		Surface
Direction	m	ft	Surface
09/27	1,000	3,281	Asphalt

Voss Airport, Bømoen (Norwegian: Voss flyplass, Bømoen) (ICAO: ENBM) is a general aviation airport located on the former Bømoen Base in Vossevangen in Voss Municipality in Vestland county, Norway. The airport consists of an asphalt 1,000-meter (3,300 ft) runway designated 09/27. The municipal airport is used by the helicopter operator Fonnafly as well as for hanggliding, parachuting and sailplane activities.

The airport was built by the Norwegian Army in 1935. It was taken over by the Luftwaffe during World War II, resulting in a new and longer runway being built. Since 1958 there has been civilian aviation at the airport. The annual Extreme Sport Festival has used the airport since 1998. It is accessible by a spur of County Road 307.

== History ==
Bømoen Base was established by the Norwegian Army in 1899, replacing older bases in Vik Municipality and Lærdal Municipality. The Bergen Line was being constructed and by placing a base on the railway it would be possible to have quick access to Eastern Norway. This was considered important at the time because the main threat of war at the time was with Sweden. The airport was established in 1935, when the Norwegian Army Air Service built a small airfield, aligned southwest–northeast.

Bømoen was taken over by Luftwaffe with the German occupation of Norway on 9 April 1940. Work with expanding the airport commenced in May, and was conducted based on the need for defending Bergen. By 1941 work on the airport was stopped, as the Wehrmacht decided to instead build Herdla Airport. By then Bømoen had received a 1,000-by-50-meter (3,280 by 160 ft) runway with sections in concrete and others in wood. This work involved moving the runway and giving it an east–west alignment. The airport proved to have poor landing conditions and was after the opening of Herdla in diminutive use. No airborne units were ever stationed at Bømoen.

Voss Flyklubb was established in 1958 with its home at Bømoen. In 1960 it organized its first sailplane gathering there. Bømoen soon developed into an important center for sailplane flights, and attracted participants from throughout Hordaland and Valdres. The high interest for sailplanes lasted through the 1960s. Thereafter Os Airport, Vaksinen reopened and the local recruitment stagnated. From the 1970s Os Aero Club took over the gatherings, organizing two annual gatherings, in Eastern and during the summer. These constituted the club's main training activities. The first edition of the Extreme Sport Week took place in 1998.

The Norwegian Defence Estates Agency sold Bømoen Base in 2013 to the company Bømoen AS. During the negotiations the municipality attempted to secure purchasing only the airport, but no the rest of the base. At the time the municipality had an agreement which secured a lease until 2023. An agreement was struck whereby the municipality was granted a land lease until 2073 for 7.5 hectares (19 acres) consisting of the runway, taxiways and the apron.

== Facilities ==
Voss Airport, Bømoen is located on the premises of the Bømoen Base, about 4 kilometers (2.5 mi) east of Vossevangen. The aerodrome consists of an asphalt runway measuring 1,000 by 30 meters (3,281 by 98 ft) and aligned 09/27 (east–west). The airport has a reference elevation of 91 meters (299 ft) above mean sea level. Air navigation consists of two VOR/DME beacons. Skydive Voss has an 800-square-meter (8,600 sq ft) club house at the airport, which in addition to course and technical facilities has accommodation for eighteen people.

Fonnafly has a base and hangar at Bømoen. The helicopter operates has a Eurocopter AS350 stationed at the airport. Clubs based at the airport consist of Skydive Voss, and the aviation club Voss Flyklubb. Bergen Skydiving Club uses Bømoen during the summer. Every June the Extreme Sport Festival is organized in Voss. The airport plays a central sole for several of these events, including parachuting and hanggliding.

The airport is limited to aircraft with a maximum take-off weight of 5.7 tonnes (5.6 long tons; 6.3 short tons) as well as helicopters. Flight is only permitted during daylight with visual flight rules. Most parachuting and sailplane activity takes place during the period May through September. The runway closes during the winter during periods of snow.

== Accidents and incidents ==
A Cessna 172 crashed on 27 June 1987, killing two and seriously injuring two. The accident took place during a failed abortion of an approach, causing the aircraft to crash into the forests near the airport.

== Bibliography ==
- Gjerdåker, Johannes (1999). Levande landskap: Vossebygdene – Granvin – Nærøydalen (in Norwegian). Voss: Voss Veksel- og Landmandsbank. ISBN 8271282875.
- Hafsten, Bjørn; Larsstuvold, Ulf; Olsen, Bjørn; Stenersen, Sten (1991). Flyalarm: Luftkrigen over Norge 1939–1945 (in Norwegian). Oslo: Sem & Stenersen. ISBN 82-7046-058-3.
- Hjelmeland, Britt-Elise (2000). Landsverneplan for Forsvaret : verneplan for eiendommer, bygninger og anlegg : Katalog Sør- og Vestlandet, Trøndelag og Nord-Norge (in Norwegian). Oslo: Forsvarets bygningstjeneste.
- Skorpen, Lars (1996). Ein flygeidé – OAK 50 år (in Norwegian). Askøy: Os Aero Klubb.
