= Skiple Station =

Railway station in Voss, Norway

Skiple
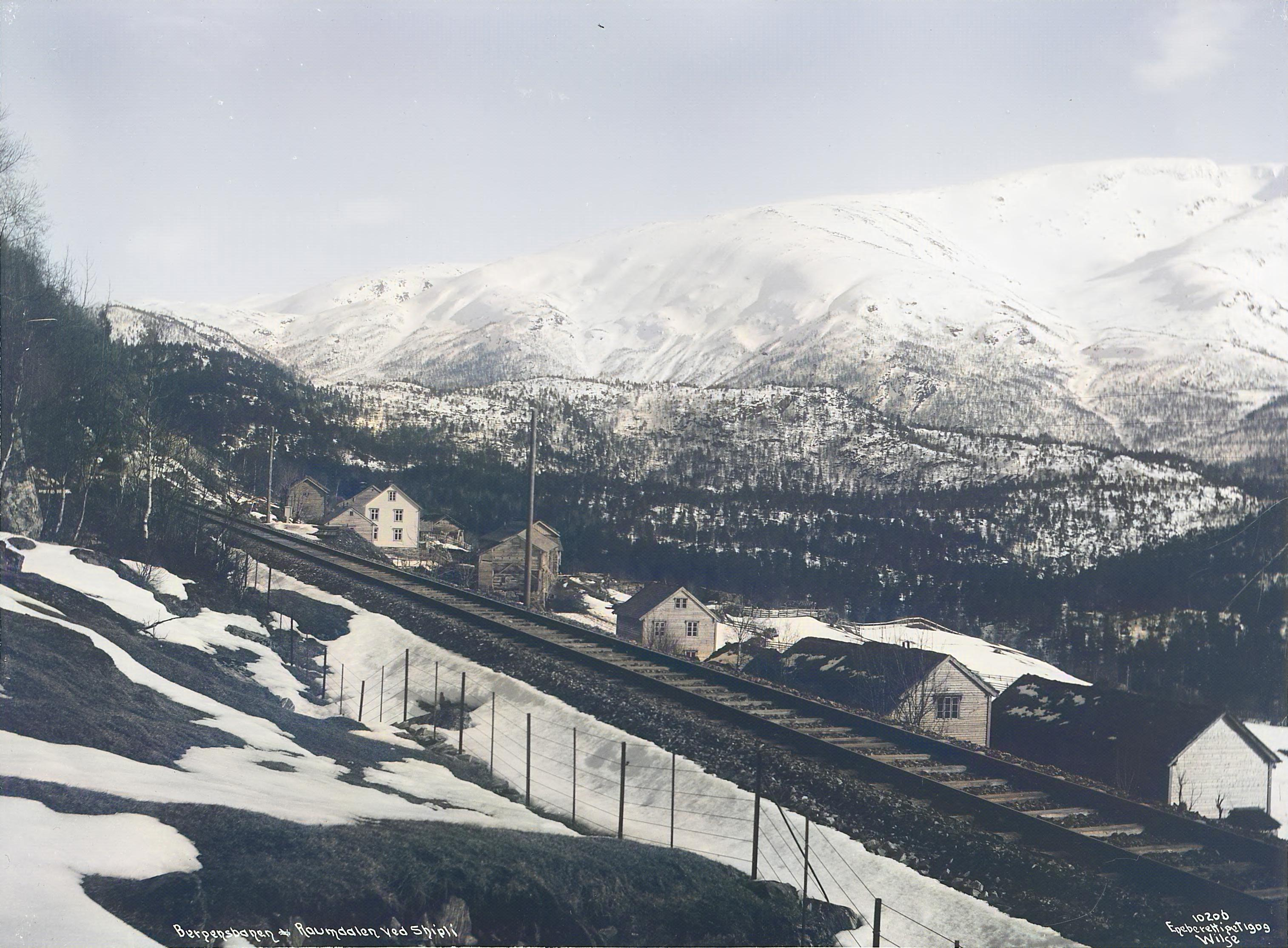
- A picture overlooking houses near the hamlet of Skiple and the railway Bergensbanen, 1909

General information
- Location: Skiple, Voss Municipality; Norway
- Coordinates: 60.6814°N 6.67972°E
- Owner: Bane NOR
- Operator: Vy Tog
- Line: Bergen Line
- Distance: 366.30 kilometres (227.61 mi)
- Platforms: 1

History
- Opened: 1931
Location

Skiple Station (Norwegian: Skiple holdeplass) is a railway station along the Bergen Line railway line. It is located at the village of Skiple in the central part of the Raundalen valley in Voss Municipality, Vestland county, Norway. The station is served by the Bergen Commuter Rail, operated by Vy Tog, with up to five daily departures in each direction. The station was opened in 1931.

Preceding station		Following station
Øyeflaten	Bergen Line	Reimegrend
Preceding station	Local trains	Following station
Øyeflaten	Bergen Commuter Rail	Reimegrend
