= Mjølfjell Station =

Railway station in Voss, Norway

Mjølfjell
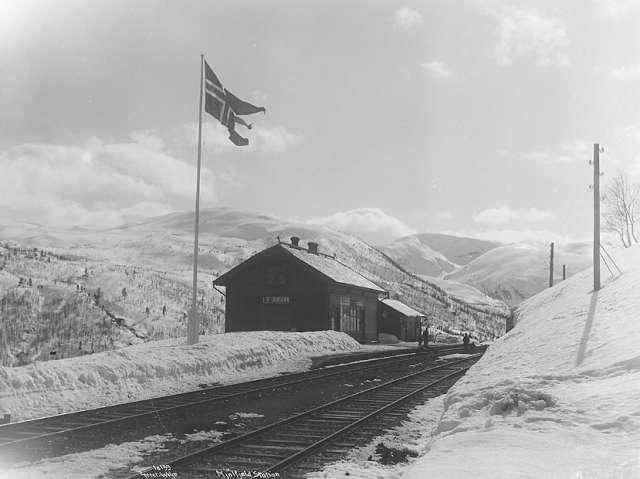
- 1909

General information
- Location: Mjølfjell, Voss Municipality; Norway
- Coordinates: 60°41′40″N 6°50′28″E
- Elevation: 627.2 m (2,058 ft)
- Owner: Bane NOR
- Operator: Vy Tog
- Line: Bergen Line
- Distance: 354.22 kilometres (220.10 mi)
- Platforms: 1

History
- Opened: 1908
Location

Mjølfjell Station (Norwegian: Mjølfjell stasjon) is a railway station along the Bergen Line in the village of Mjølfjell in the eastern part of the Raundalen valley in Voss Municipality, Vestland county, Norway. The station is served by the Bergen Commuter Rail, operated by Vy Tog, with up to five daily departures in each direction, in addition to one weekly express train. The station was opened in 1908. The surrounding area is dominantly recreational, with many cabins. It is accessible by a spur of County Road 5386. The station takes its name from the nearby mountain Mjølfjellet.

== Gallery ==
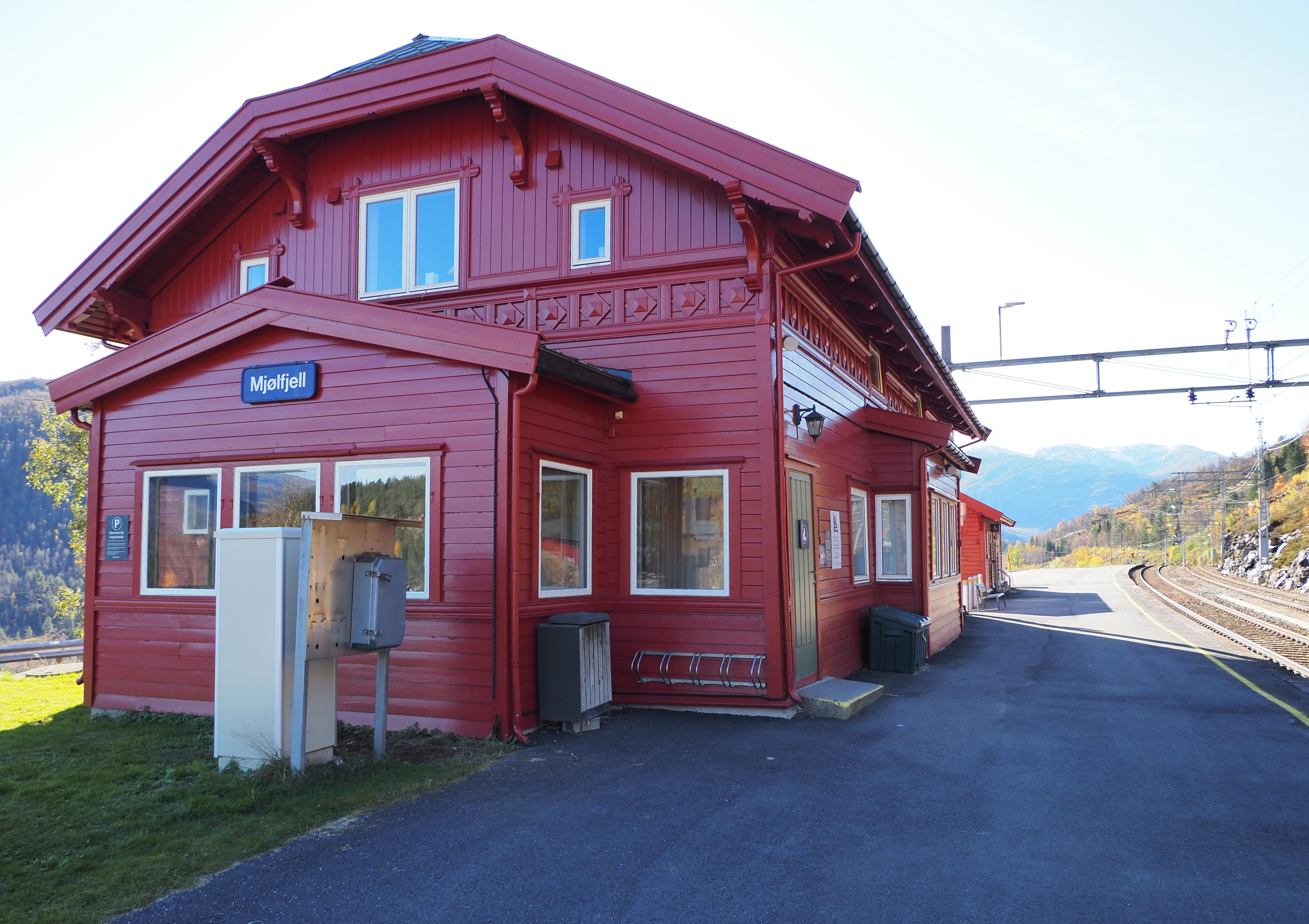
Mjølfjell station

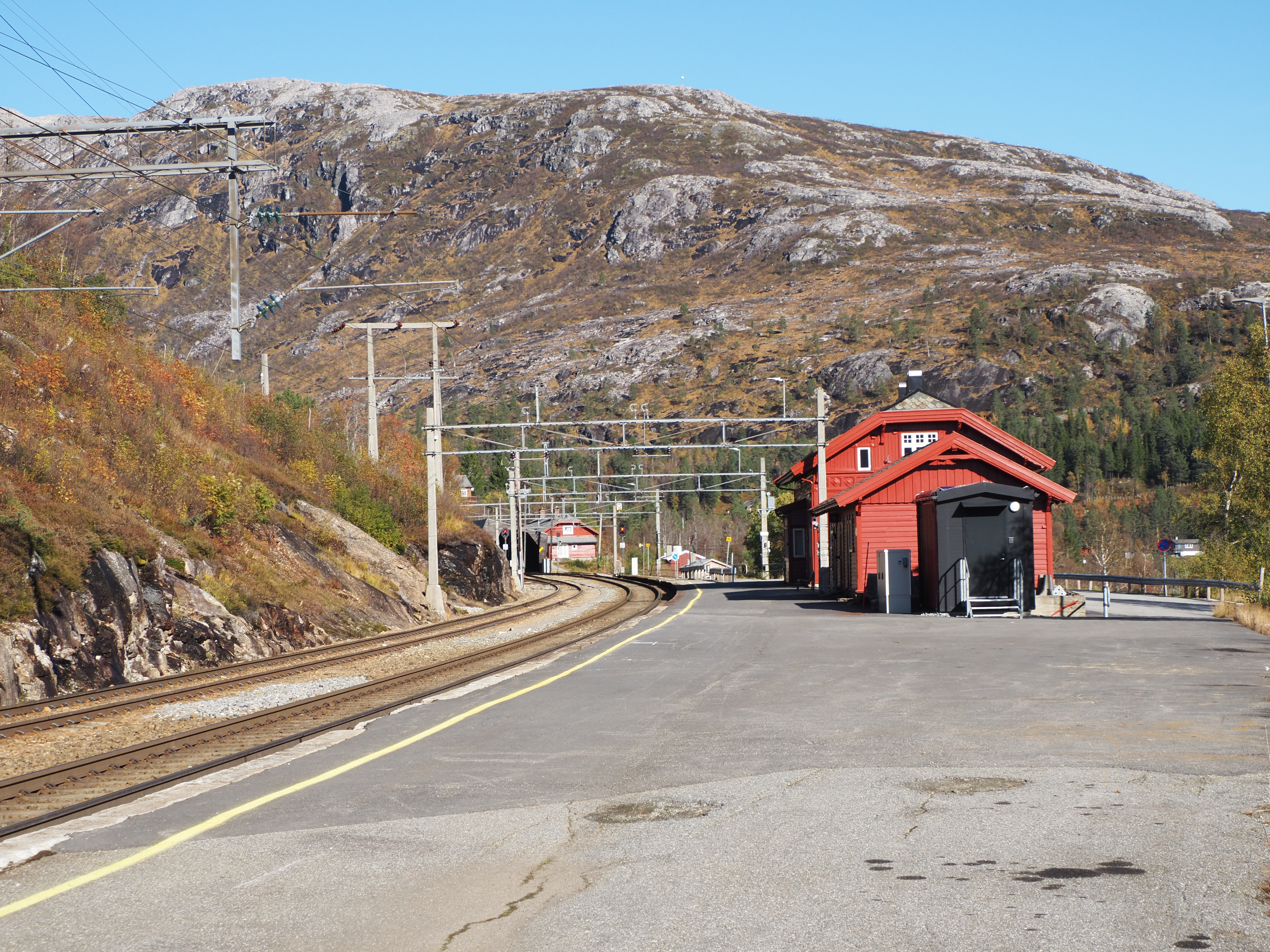
Mjølfjell station and platform

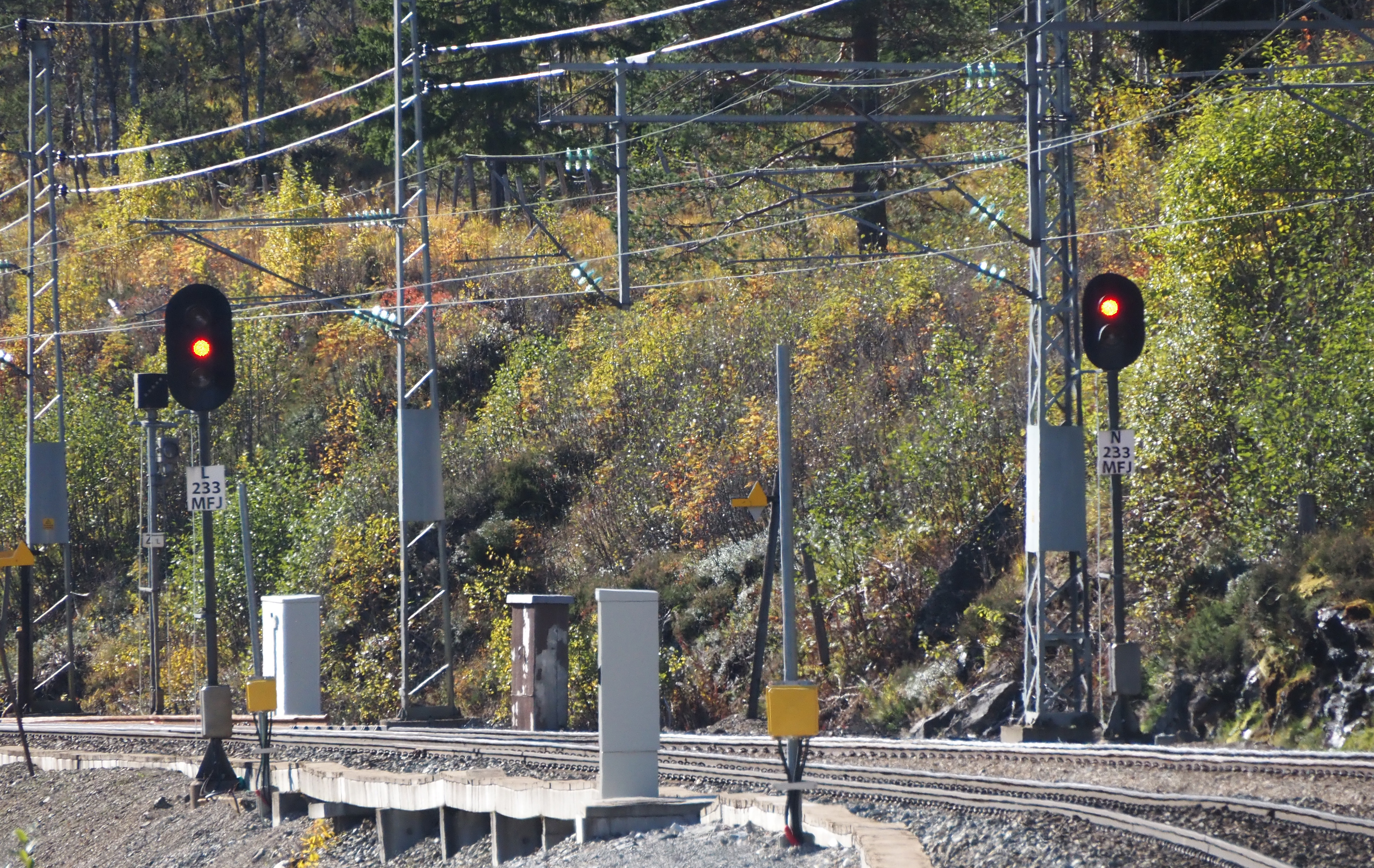
Exit signals L+M233 MJF

Preceding station		Following station
Eggjareid	Bergen Line	Ljosanbotn
Preceding station	Local trains	Following station
Eggjareid	Bergen Commuter Rail	Ljosanbotn
