= Øyeflaten Station =

Railway station in Norway

Øyeflaten
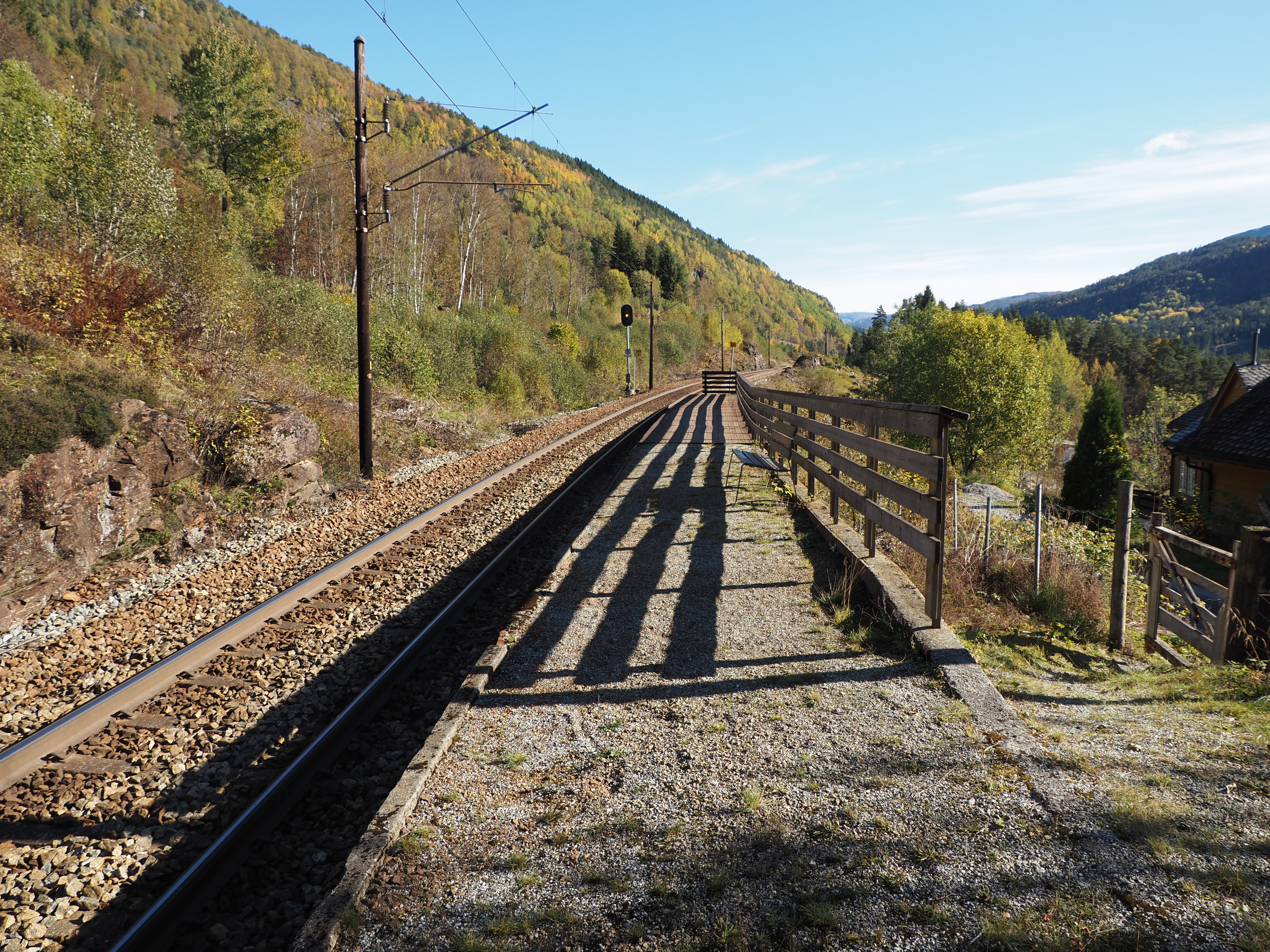
- Øyeflaten Station

General information
- Location: Øyeflaten, Voss Municipality; Norway
- Coordinates: 60.6803°N 6.6275°E
- Owner: Bane NOR
- Operator: Vy Tog
- Line: Bergensbanen
- Distance: 369.40 kilometres (229.53 mi)
- Platforms: 1

History
- Opened: 1931
Location

Øyeflaten Station (Norwegian: Øyeflaten stasjon) is a railway station along the Bergensbanen railway line. It is located in the village of Øyeflaten in the Raundalen valley in Voss Municipality, Vestland county, Norway. The station is served by the Bergen Commuter Rail, operated by Vy Tog, with up to five daily departures in each direction. The station was opened in 1931.

Preceding station		Following station
Urdland	Bergensbanen	Skiple
Preceding station	Local trains	Following station
Urdland	Bergen Commuter Rail	Skiple
