= Gol Station =

Railway station in Gol, Norway

Gol
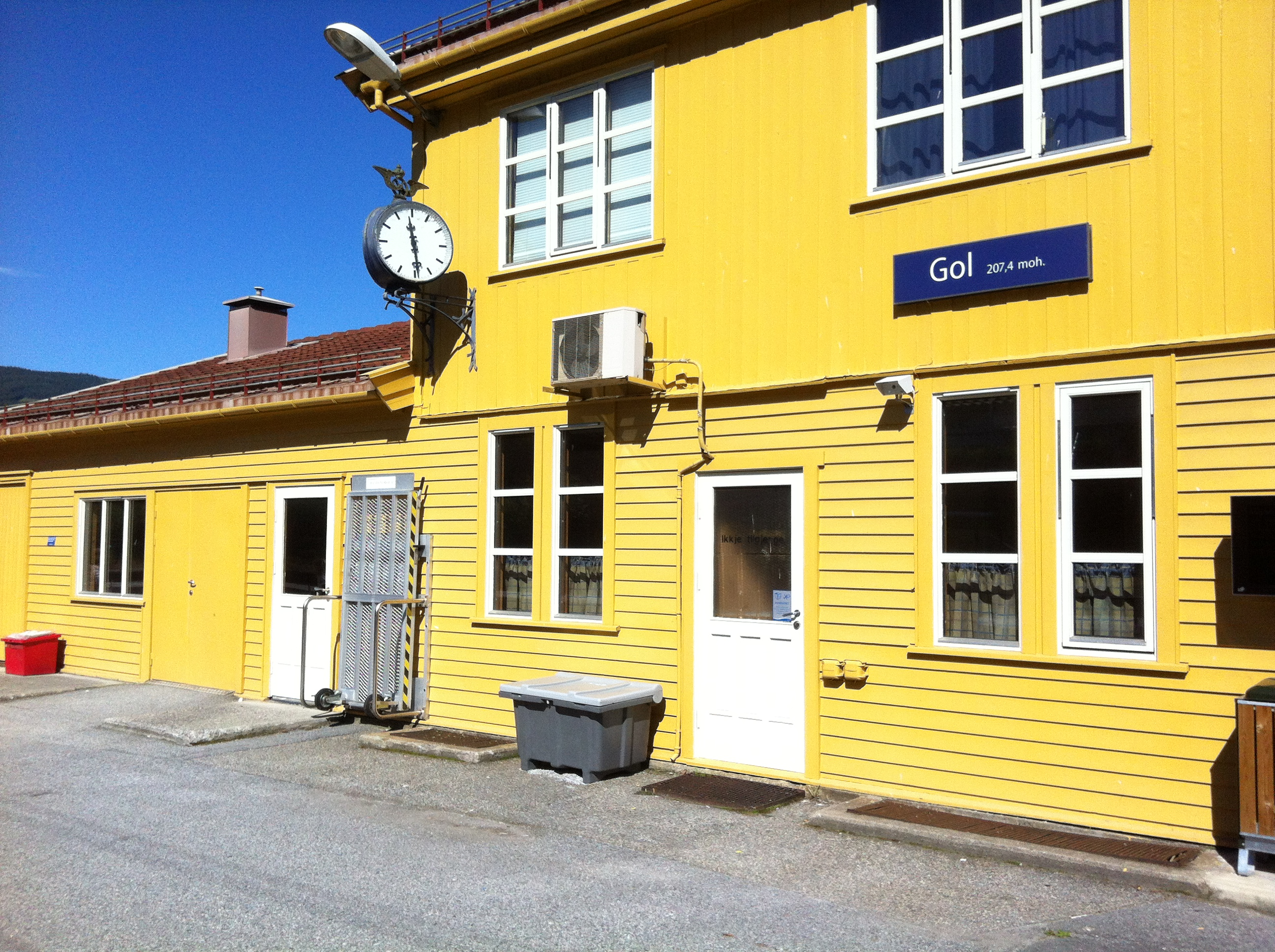
- Gol Station

General information
- Location: Gol; Norway
- Coordinates: 60.6991°N 8.9714°E
- Elevation: 207.4 m (680 ft)
- Owner: Bane NOR
- Operator: Vy Tog
- Line: Bergen Line
- Distance: 202,38 km
- Connections: Bus: Fagernes, Hemsedal and Sogn

Construction
- Architect: Paul Due

History
- Opened: 1907
Location

Gol Station (Norwegian: Gol stasjon) is a train station located at Gol in Buskerud, Norway. The station is served by up to six daily express trains operated by Vy Tog. The station was opened as part of the Bergen Line between Bergen and Gulsvik in 1907.

Preceding station			Following station
Ål	Bergen Line		Nesbyen
Preceding station	Express trains		Following station
Ål	F4	Bergen–Oslo S	Nesbyen
