= Flå Station =

Railway station in Flå, Norway

Coordinates: 60°25′54.534″N 9°28′24.208″E

Flå
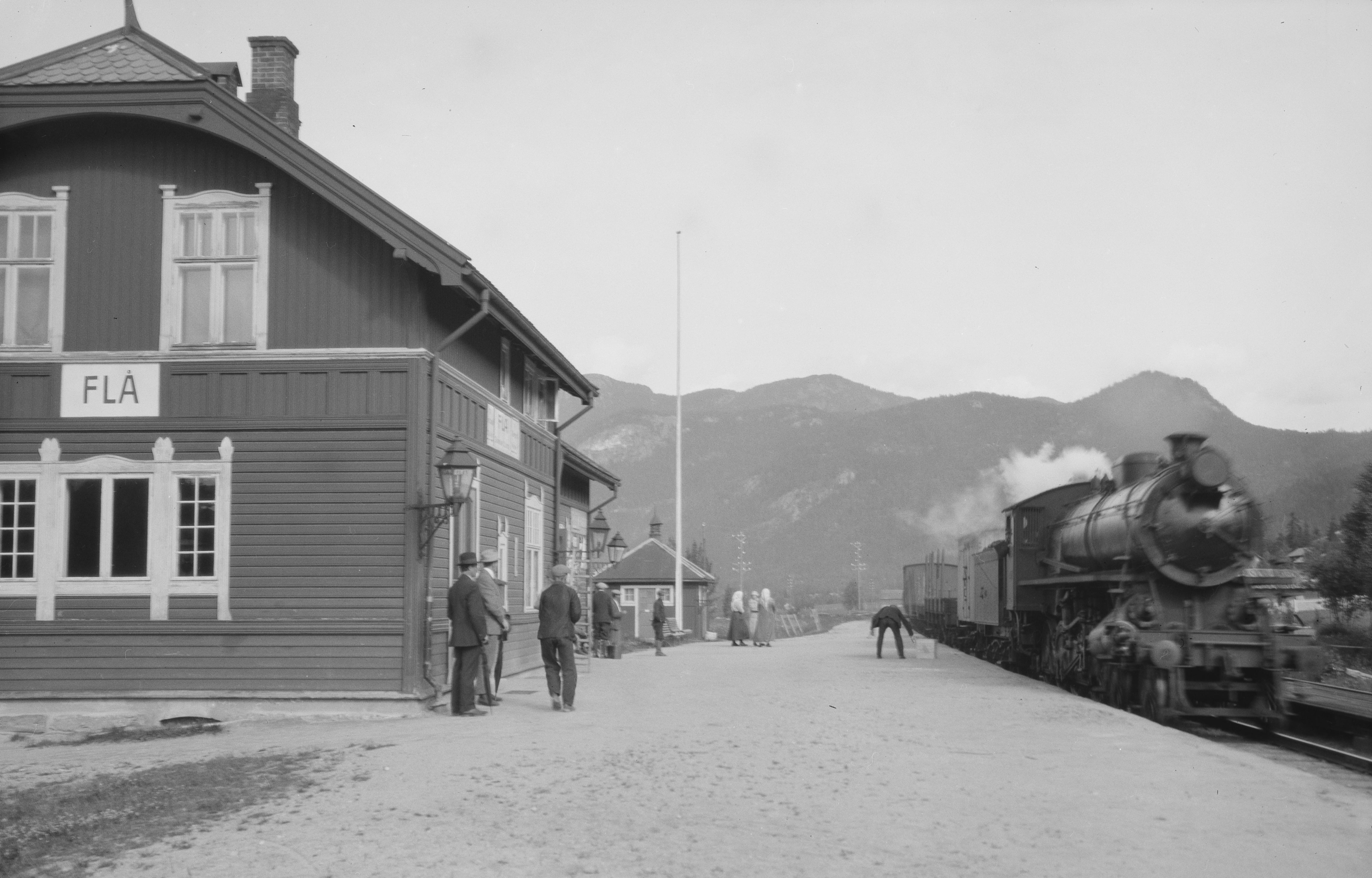

General information
- Location: Flå, Flå; Norway
- Elevation: 155 metres (509 ft)
- Owner: Bane NOR
- Operator: Vy Tog
- Line: Bergensbanen
- Distance: 152 kilometres (94 mi)

History
- Opened: 1907
Location

Flå Station (Norwegian: Flå stasjon) is a railway station located in Flå, Norway. The station is served by two daily express trains each direction on the Bergen Line, operated by Vy Tog. Travel time to Oslo is approximately 4 hours.

== History ==
Opened 21 December 1907 as part of Bergensbanen between Bergen and Gulsvik. Originally named Flaa until spelling changed to Flå in April 1921. Upgraded from halt to full station in 1913. Remotely controlled since 7 December 1984 and unmanned since 1 January 1985.

== Location ==
Flå Station is located about 1 km (0.62 mi) from Flå town center, with bus connections available. The station features a single platform and basic amenities.

== Services ==
- Vy RE (Bergen - Oslo): 2 trains daily each direction
- No freight service
- Unstaffed station with ticket machines

Preceding station			Following station
Nesbyen	Bergensbanen		Hønefoss
Preceding station	Express trains		Following station
Nesbyen	F4	Bergen–Oslo S	Hønefoss
