= Volli Station =

Former railway halt in Voss, Norway

Volli
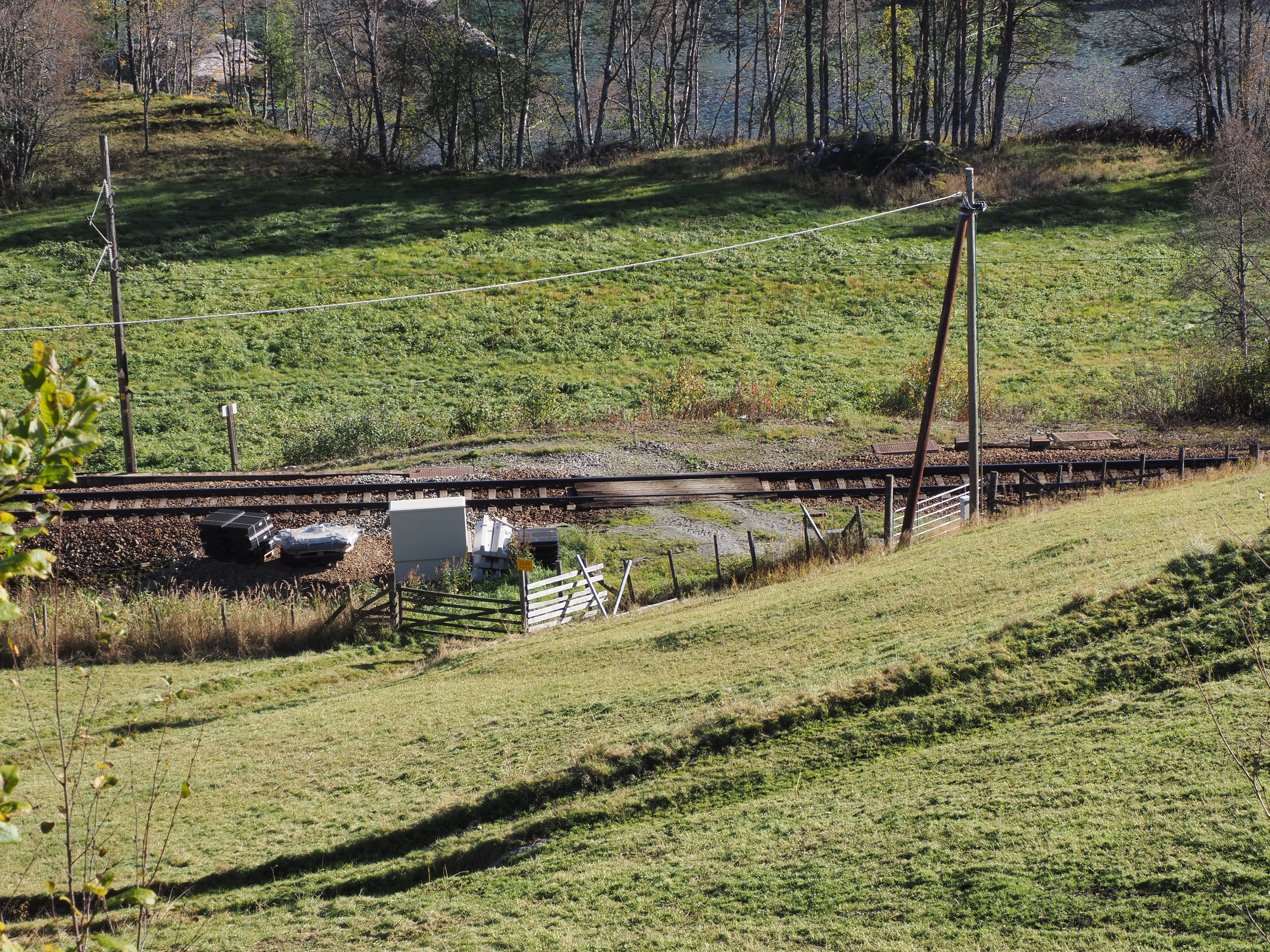

General information
- Location: Volli, Voss Municipality; Norway
- Coordinates: 60.6686°N 6.77583°E
- Line: Bergen Line
- Distance: 359.80 kilometres (223.57 mi)
- Platforms: 1

History
- Opened: 1936
- Closed: 2012
Location

Volli Station (Norwegian: Volli holdeplass) is a former railway station along the Bergen Line. It is located at Volli in the Raundalen valley in Voss Municipality in Vestland county, Norway. The station was served by the Bergen Commuter Rail, operated by Norges Statsbaner, with up to five daily departures in each direction. The station was opened in 1936 and closed in December 2012.

Preceding station		Following station
Reimegrend	Bergen Line	Eggjareid
