= Gardnos crater =

Meteorite impact crater in Norway

Coordinates: 60°39′N 9°0′E

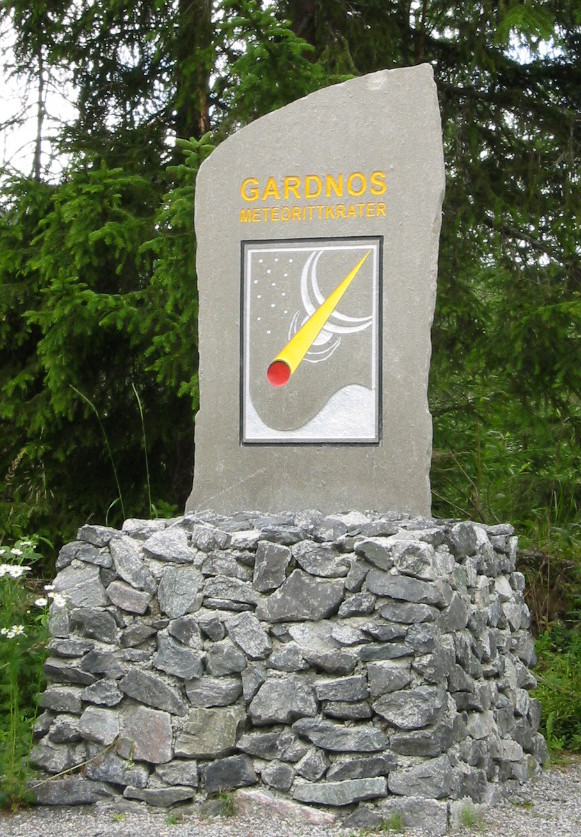
- Gardnos Crater

- Location within Norway
- Location: Nesbyen municipality, Buskerud, Norway

Impact crater structure
- Confidence: Confirmed
- Diameter: 5 kilometres (3 mi)
- Age: 500 ± 10 Ma
- Exposed: Yes
- Drilled: No

Gardnos crater (Gardnos krateret) is a meteorite impact crater in Nesbyen municipality in Buskerud, Norway. It is located inside Meteorite Park (Meteorittparken) at Gardnos 10 kilometres (6.2 mi) north of the town of Nesbyen.

Gardnos crater is 5 kilometres (3 mi) in diameter, and was created when a meteorite with an estimated diameter of 200 to 300 metres (660 to 980 ft) struck 500 million years ago. At first this site was believed to be a volcanic crater, but in 1990 two geologists, Johan Naterstad and Johannes A. Dons, confirmed that it was in fact formed by meteorite impact.

The original bedrock in the area was fractured and a powder of crushed rocks was forced into all the fractures (an impact breccia). This is the origin of the peculiar rock in this area. It is possible to drive into the centre of the crater, which makes the Gardnos crater one of the world's most accessible meteorite craters. There are two trails through the surrounding natural region, with information signs describing the unique geology of the area.
