= Urdland Station =

Railway station in Voss, Norway

Urdland
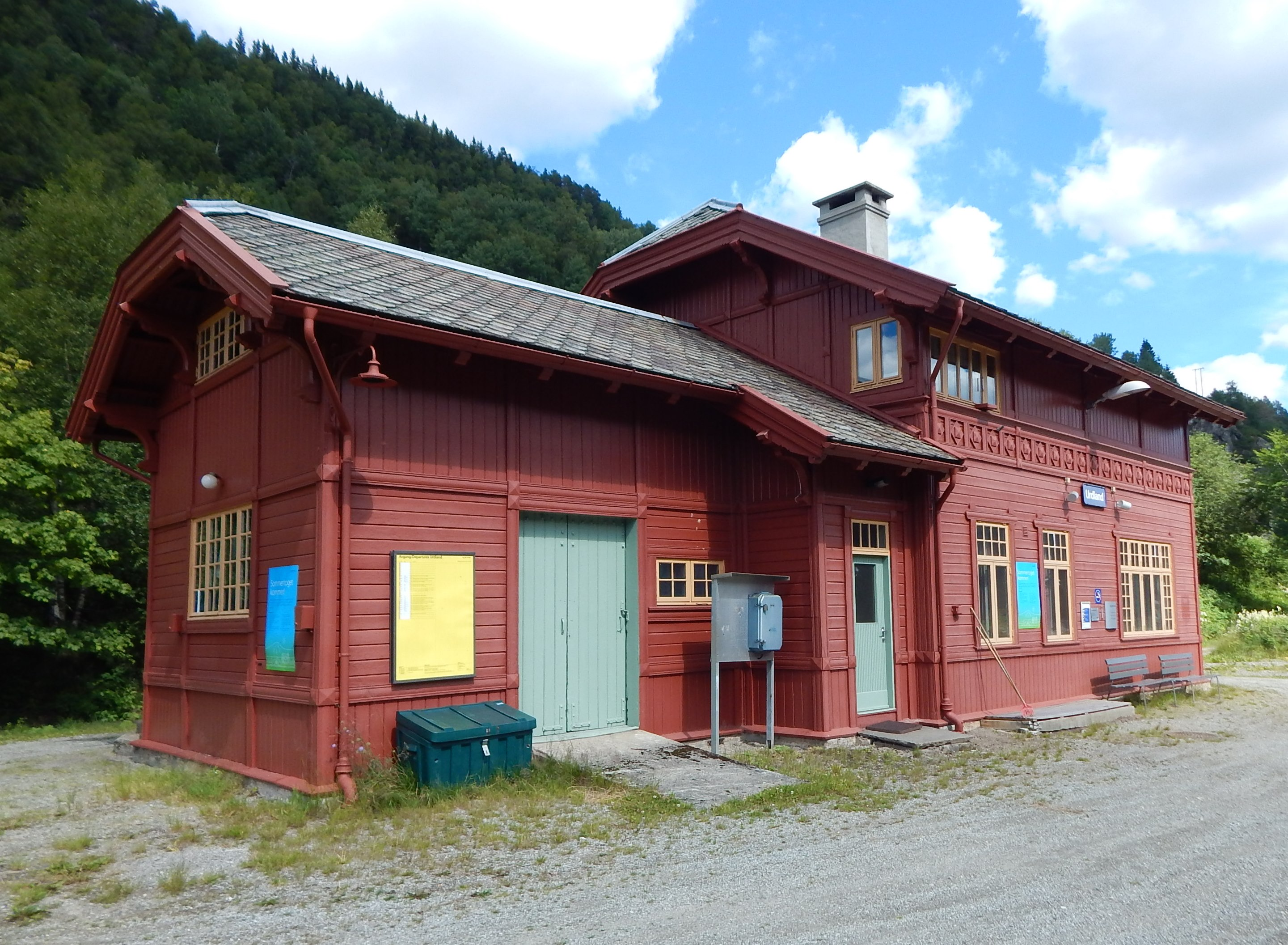

General information
- Location: Urdland, Voss Municipality; Norway
- Coordinates: 60.6797°N 6.59278°E
- Elevation: 304.0 m (997.4 ft)
- Owner: Bane NOR
- Operator: Vy Tog
- Line: Bergen Line
- Distance: 371.52 kilometres (230.85 mi)
- Platforms: 1

History
- Opened: 1908
Location

Urdland Station (Norwegian: Urdland stasjon) is a railway station on the Bergen Line. It is located at Urdland in the Raundalen valley in Voss Municipality, Vestland county, Norway. The station is served by the Bergen Commuter Rail, operated by Vy Tog, with up to five daily departures in each direction. The station was opened in 1908.

| Preceding station | | Following station |
|---|---|---|
| Kløve | Bergen Line | Øyeflaten |
| Preceding station | Local trains | Following station |
| Kløve | Bergen Commuter Rail | Øyeflaten |
