= Ygre Station =

Railway station in Voss, Norway

Ygre
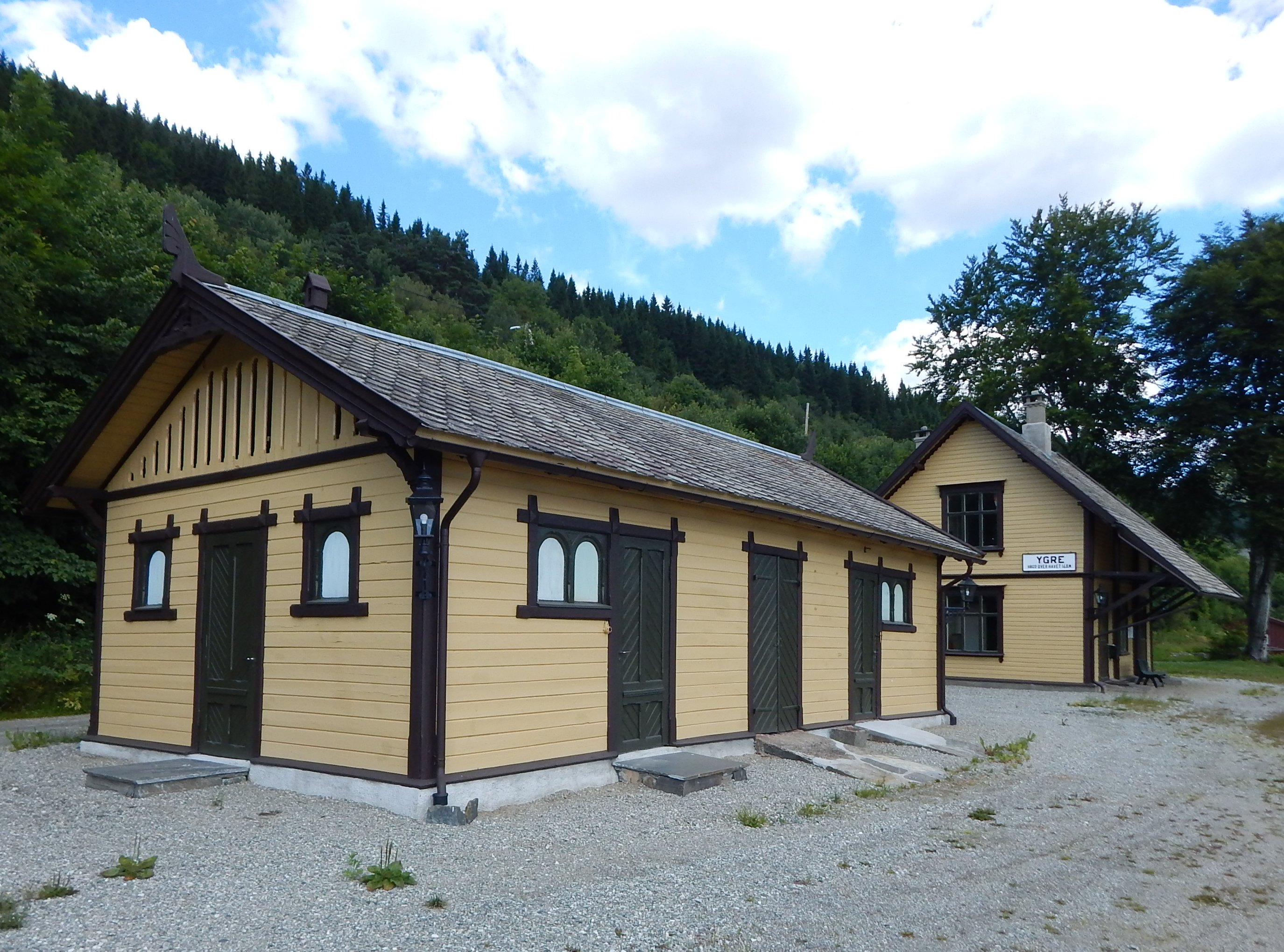

General information
- Location: Ygre, Voss Municipality; Norway
- Coordinates: 60.6453°N 6.50694°E
- Owner: Bane NOR
- Operator: Vy Tog
- Line: Bergensbanen
- Distance: 379.03 kilometres (235.52 mi)
- Platforms: 1

History
- Opened: 1908
Location

Ygre Station (Norwegian: Ygre stasjon) is a railway station on the Bergensbanen railway line. It is located at the village of Ygre in Voss Municipality, Vestland county, Norway. The station is served by the Bergen Commuter Rail, operated by Vy Tog, with up to five daily departures in each direction. The station was opened in 1908. The station building is the former building at Nesttun station that had grown too small and was moved here.

The station is accessible via County Road 5386, which runs parallel to the Bergen Line, and County Road 5388 branches off to the north immediately west of the station.

Preceding station		Following station
Gjerdåker	Bergensbanen	Kløve
Preceding station	Local trains	Following station
Gjerdåker	Bergen Commuter Rail	Kløve
