= Reimegrend Station =

Railway station in Voss, Norway

Reimegrend
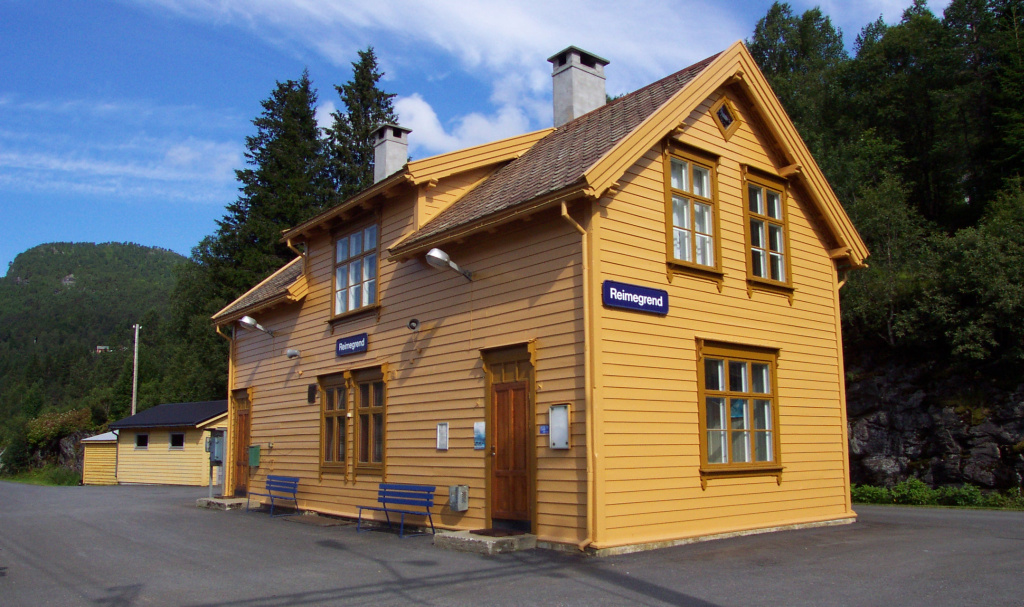

General information
- Location: Reimegrend, Voss Municipality; Norway
- Coordinates: 60°40′42″N 6°43′51″E
- Elevation: 464.6 m (1,524 ft)
- Owner: Bane NOR
- Operator: Vy Tog
- Line: Bergen Line
- Distance: 362.73 kilometres (225.39 mi)
- Platforms: 1

History
- Opened: 1908
Location

Reimegrend Station (Norwegian: Reimegrend stasjon) is a railway station along the Bergen Line. It is located at the village of Reimegrend in the Raundalen valley in Voss Municipality in Vestland county, Norway. The station is served by the Bergen Commuter Rail, operated by Vy Tog, with up to five daily departures in each direction. The station was opened in 1908. It was formerly the western turning point for snow clearing services along the Bergen Line. It is accessible by a spur of County Road 5386.

Preceding station		Following station
Skiple	Bergen Line	Volli
Preceding station	Local trains	Following station
Skiple	Bergen Commuter Rail	Volli
