= Ål Station =

Railway station in Ål, Norway

Ål
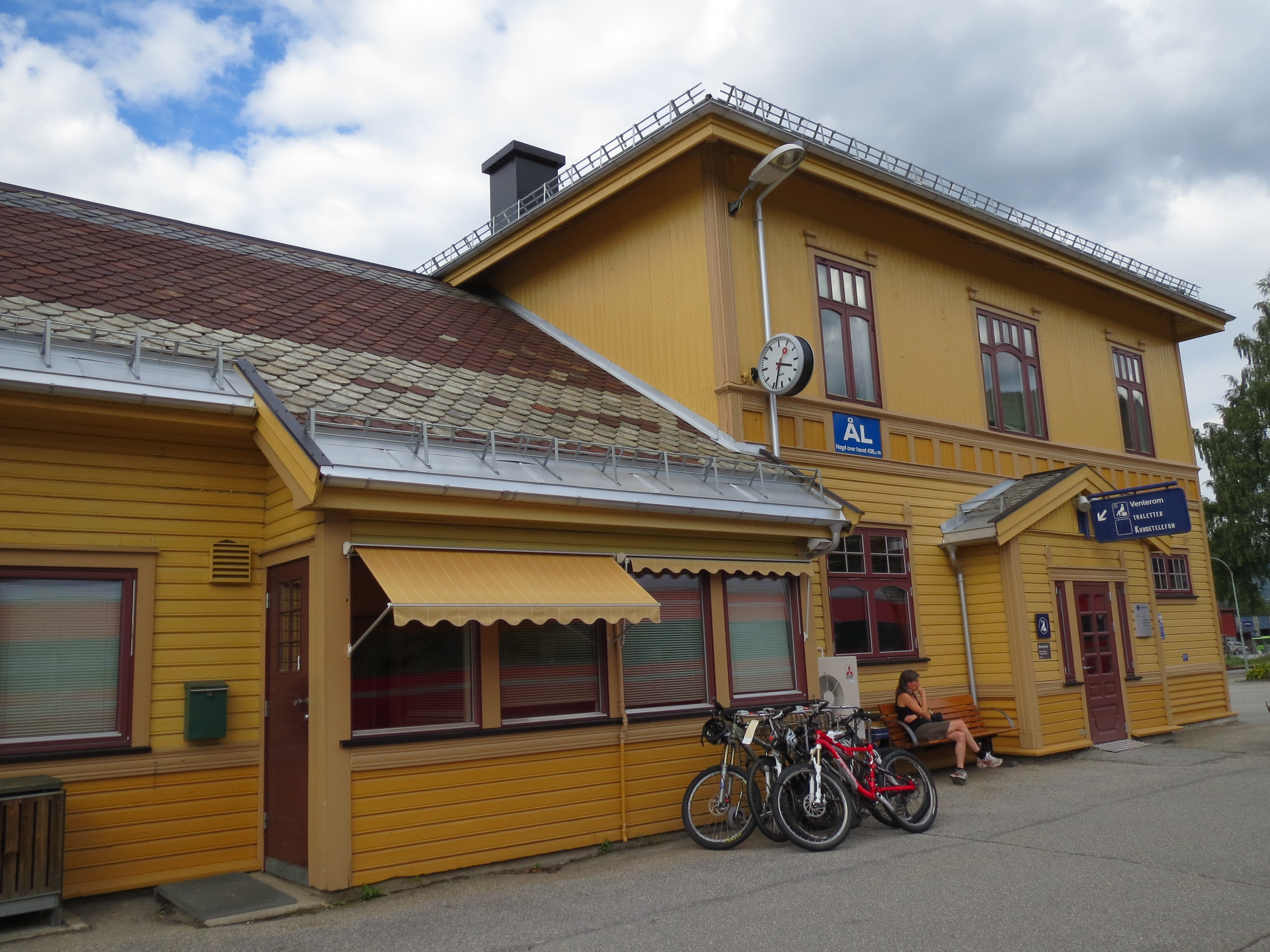

General information
- Location: Ål, Norway
- Coordinates: 60°37′34.234″N 8°33′43.654″E
- Elevation: 436.6 m (1,432 ft)
- Owner: Bane NOR
- Operator: Vy Tog
- Line: Bergen Line
- Distance: 228.21 km (141.80 mi)

History
- Opened: 1907
Location

Ål Station (Norwegian: Ål stasjon) is a railway station located at Ål, Norway. The station is served by up to six daily express trains operated by Vy Tog. The station was opened as part of the Bergen Line between Bergen and Gulsvik in 1907.

On 1 November 1930, the restaurant was taken over by Norsk Spisevognselskap. In 1948, they erected a separate restaurant building at the station.

Preceding station			Following station
Geilo	Bergen Line		Gol
Preceding station	Express trains		Following station
Geilo	F4	Bergen–Oslo S	Gol
