= Eggjareid Station =

Railway station in Voss, Norway

Eggjareid
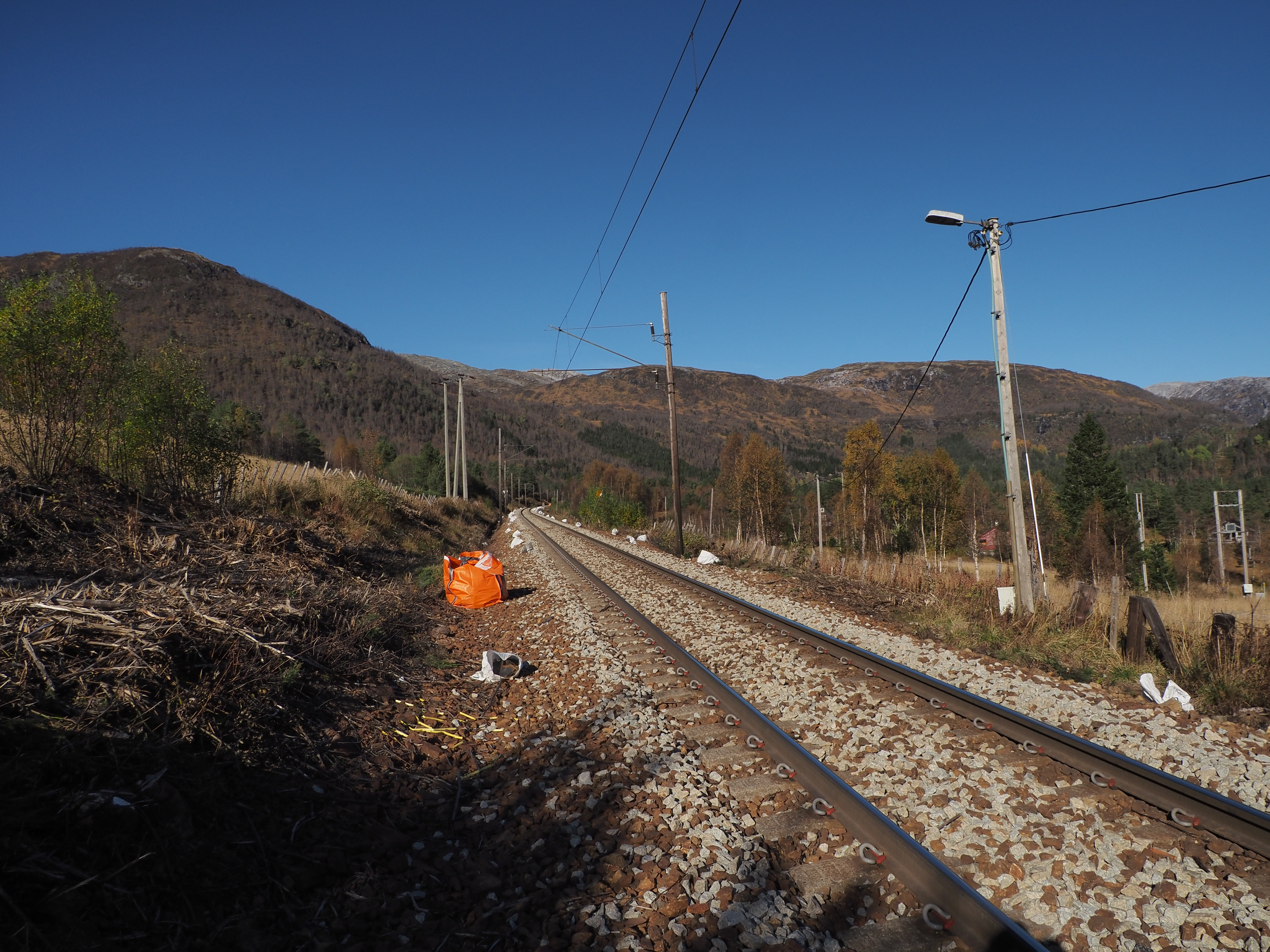

General information
- Location: Eggjareid, Voss Municipality; Norway
- Coordinates: 60.6736°N 6.8075°E
- Line: Bergensbanen
- Distance: 357.55 kilometres (222.17 mi)
- Platforms: 1

History
- Opened: 1936
- Closed: 2012
Location

Eggjareid Station (Norwegian: Eggjareid holdeplass) is a former railway station along the Bergensbanen railway line. It is located at the village of Eggjareid in the Raundalen valley in Voss Municipality in Vestland county, Norway. The station was served by the Bergen Commuter Rail until its closure in 2012. The station was opened in 1936.

Preceding station		Following station
Volli	Bergensbanen	Mjølfjell
Preceding station	Local trains	Following station
Volli	Bergen Commuter Rail	Mjølfjell
