= Klyve =

Village in Voss Municipality, Norway

Klyve Kløve
- Hamlet
- Interactive map of Klyve
- Coordinates: 60.66792°N 6.53629°E
- Country: Norway
- Region: Western Norway
- County: Vestland
- District: Voss
- Municipality: Voss Municipality
- Elevation: 240 m (790 ft)

Population
  - Total: 920
- Time zone: UTC+01:00 (CET)
  - Summer (DST): UTC+02:00 (CEST)
- Post Code: 5700 Voss

Klyve is a hamlet and basic statistical unit (grunnkrets) in Voss Municipality in Vestland county, Norway. It is located just east of the small villages of Kyte and Nordheim. The municipal centre, Vossavangen, lies about 10 kilometres (6.2 mi) to the southwest.

Klyve includes the farms Nedra Klyve (or Nedra Kløve; lit. 'lower Klyve'; elevation 235 meters or 771 feet) to the south and Øvre Klyve (or Øvre Kløve; lit. 'upper Klyve'; elevation 275 meters or 902 feet) to the north. The settlement is accessible via Norwegian County Road 5386, also known as Raundalsvegen (lit. 'Raun Valley Road').

== History ==
The settlement was attested as Klyufua in 1427 (and as af Kliffwa in 1463 and Klufa in 1490, among other names). The original name is reconstructed as *Kljúfar from the Old Norse verb kljúfa which means 'split' or 'cleave', referring to its location between two hills.
