= Kyte, Norway =

Village in Voss Municipality, Norway

Kyte
- Hamlet
- Interactive map of Kyte
- Coordinates: 60.67065°N 6.51116°E
- Country: Norway
- Region: Western Norway
- County: Vestland
- District: Voss
- Municipality: Voss Municipality
- Elevation: 282 m (925 ft)
- Time zone: UTC+01:00 (CET)
  - Summer (DST): UTC+02:00 (CEST)
- Post Code: 5700 Voss

Kyte is a hamlet and basic statistical unit (grunnkrets) in Voss Municipality in Vestland county, Norway. It is located just southeast of the village of Nordheim and west of the village of Klyve. The municipal centre, Vossavangen, is located about 8 kilometres (5.0 mi) to the southwest.

Kyte includes the farms Nedra Kyte (literally, 'lower Kyte'; elevation 270 meters or 890 feet) to the southwest and Øvre Kyte (literally, 'upper Kyte'; elevation 307 meters or 1,007 feet) to the northeast. The settlement is accessible via Norwegian County Road 5388, also known as Kytesvegen (lit. 'Kyte Road').

The settlement was attested as Kytuin in 1303 (and as Kytin in 1417 and Kythen in 1468, among other names). The name is originally a compound of *Kýt-(v)in; the first element may mean 'hump' or 'rise' and the second element, vin, is a common Old Norse place-name element meaning 'meadow' or 'pasture'.
