= Nesbyen Station =

Railway station in Nesbyen, Norway

Coordinates: 60.576818°N 9.113653°E

Nesbyen
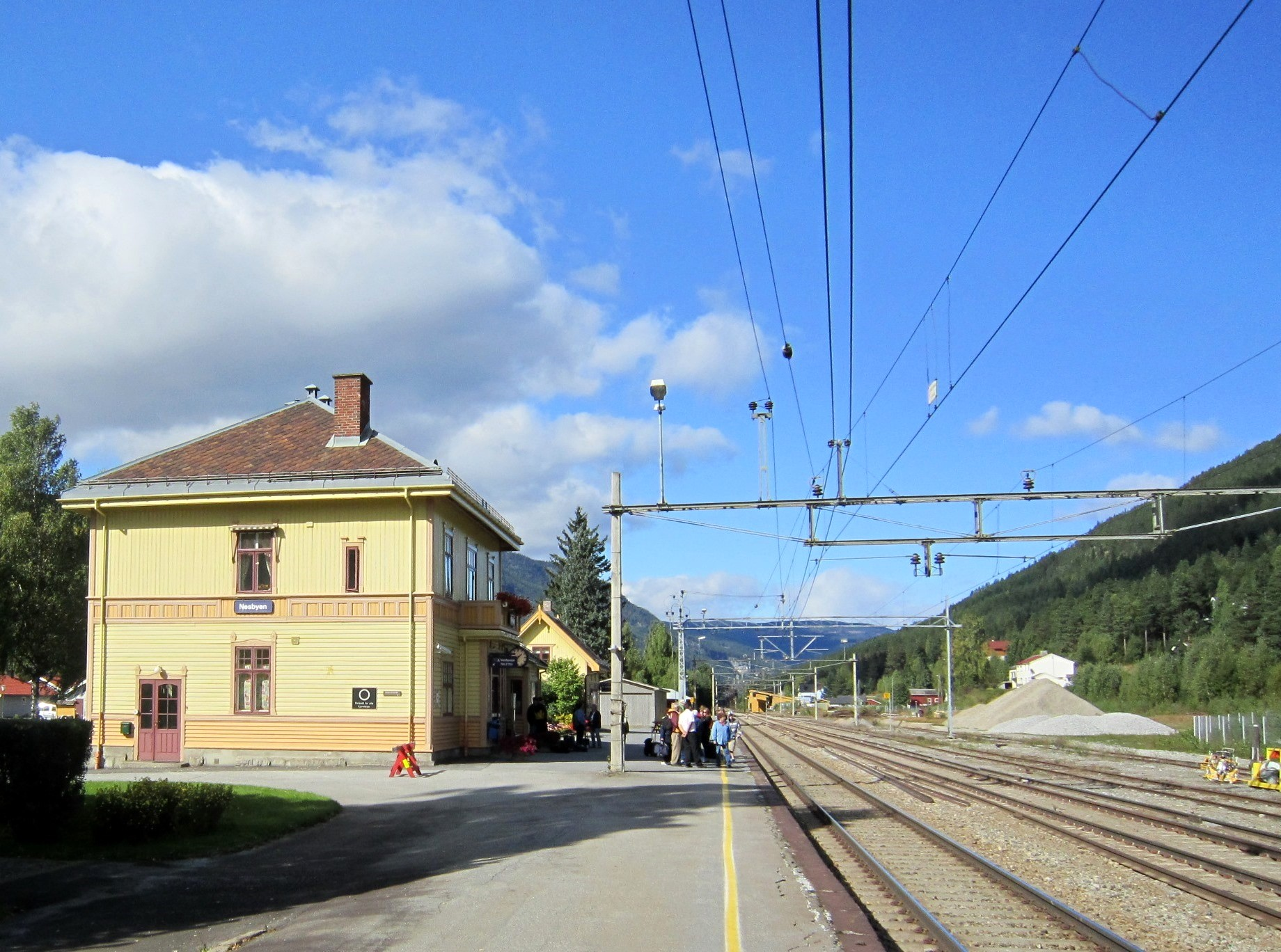

General information
- Location: Nesbyen, Nes; Norway
- Elevation: 168.8 m (554 ft)
- Owner: Bane NOR
- Operator: Vy Tog
- Line: Bergen Line
- Distance: 185.42 km

History
- Opened: 1907
Location

Nesbyen Station (Norwegian: Nesbyen stasjon) is a railway station located at Nesbyen Nes, Norway. The station is served by six daily express trains operated by Vy Tog. The station was opened as part of the Bergen Line between Bergen and Gulsvik in 1907.

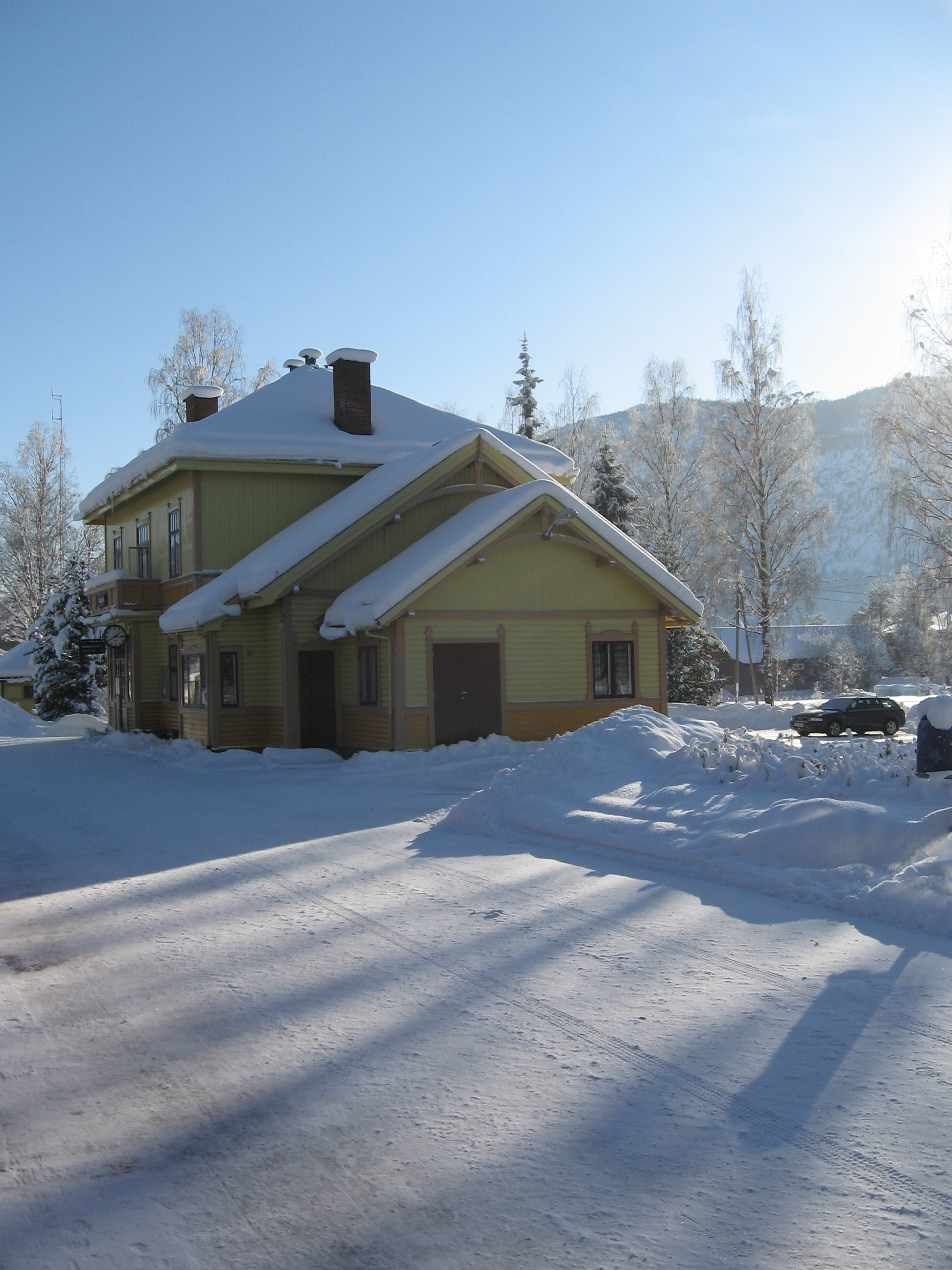
Nesbyen station, February 2009

| Preceding station | | | Following station |
|---|---|---|---|
| Gol | Bergen Line | | Flå |
| Preceding station | Express trains | | Following station |
| Gol | F4 | Bergen–Oslo S | Flå |
