= Voss Station =

Railway station in Voss, Norway

Voss
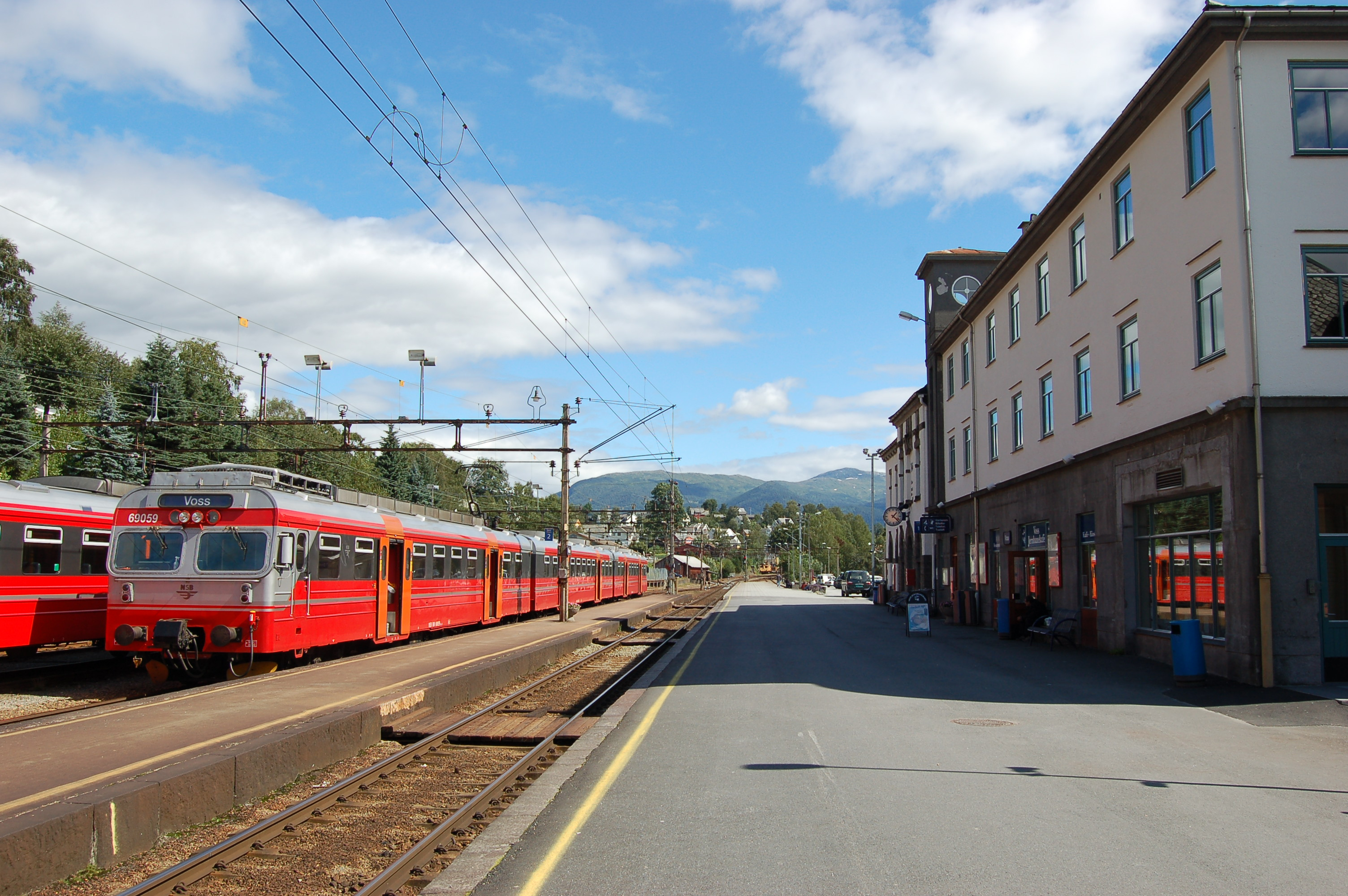
- Bergen Commuter Rail Class 69-units at Voss Station

General information
- Location: Vossevangen, Voss Municipality; Norway
- Coordinates: 60°37′45.03″N 6°24′37.26″E
- Elevation: 56.5 m (185 ft)
- Owner: Bane NOR
- Operator: Vy Tog
- Line: Bergen Line
- Distance: 385.32 km (239.43 mi)
- Platforms: 2

Other information
- Station code: VOS

History
- Opened: 1883
Location

Voss Station (Norwegian: Voss stasjon) is a railway station on the Bergen Line located in the village of Vossevangen in Voss Municipality in Vestland county, Norway. It sits just off the European route E16 highway on the northwestern shore of the lake Vangsvatnet.

The station was opened as the original terminal station of the Voss Line in 1883. It is served by express trains to Bergen and Oslo, and the Bergen Commuter Rail, all operated by Vy Tog. Most commuter trains terminate at Voss, but up to seven per day continue on to Myrdal.

The station restaurant was taken over by Norsk Spisevognselskap on 15 October 1947.

The rail station contains the lower terminus of the Voss Gondol gondola system.

| Preceding station | | | Following station |
|---|---|---|---|
| Bulken | Bergen Line | | Gjerdåker |
| Preceding station | Express trains | | Following station |
| Dale | F4 | Bergen–Oslo S | Myrdal |
| Preceding station | Local trains | | Following station |
| Bulken | | Bergen Commuter Rail | Gjerdåker |
