= Gjerdåker Station =

Railway station in Voss, Norway

Gjerdåker
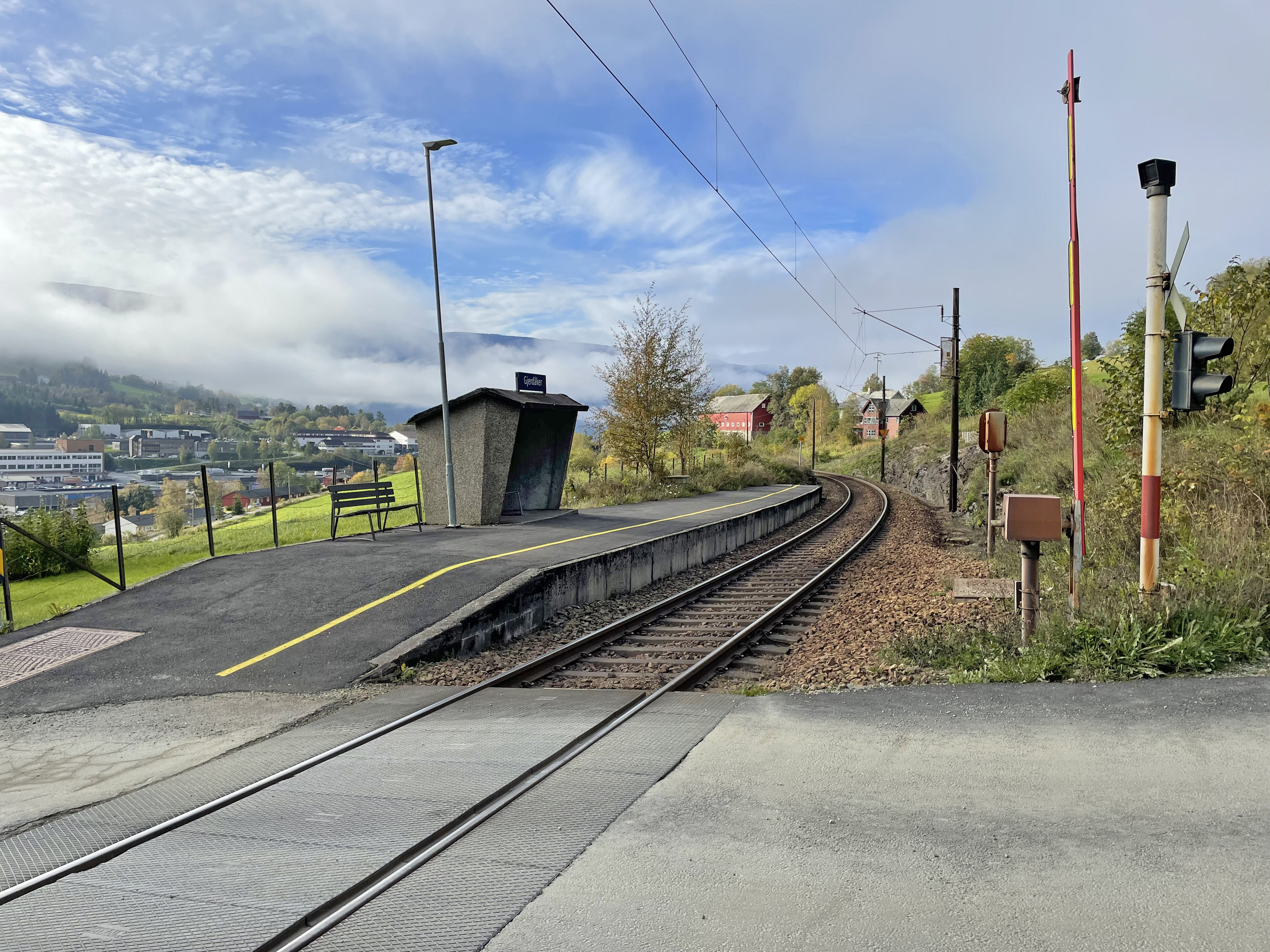

General information
- Location: Gjerdåker, Voss Municipality; Norway
- Coordinates: 60.6394°N 6.46333°E
- Owner: Bane NOR
- Operator: Vy Tog
- Line: Bergen Line
- Distance: 381.56 kilometres (237.09 mi)
- Platforms: 1

History
- Opened: 1941
Location

Gjerdåker Station (Norwegian: Gjerdåker stasjon) is a railway station on the Bergen Line. It is located at Gjerdåker on the eastern edge of the village of Vossavangen in Voss Municipality, Vestland county, Norway. The station is served by the Bergen Commuter Rail, operated by Vy Tog, with up to five daily departures in each direction. The station was opened in 1941.

Preceding station		Following station
Voss	Bergen Line	Ygre
Preceding station	Local trains	Following station
Voss	Bergen Commuter Rail	Ygre
