= Nordheim, Vestland =

Village in Voss Municipality, Norway

Nordheim Norheim
- Hamlet
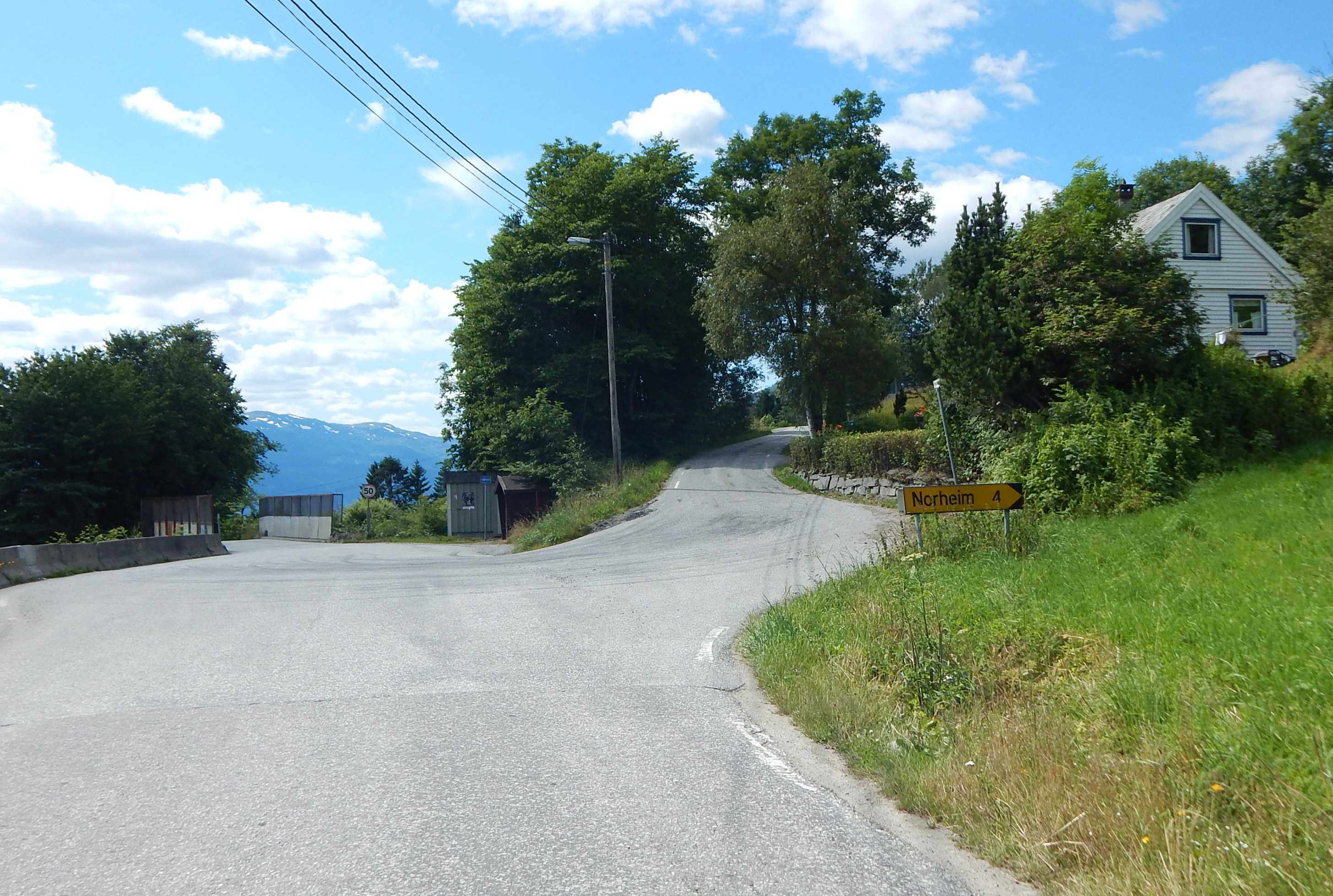
- Sign for Nordheim on County Road 308 at Ygre
- Interactive map of Nordheim
- Coordinates: 60.67413°N 6.50817°E
- Country: Norway
- Region: Western Norway
- County: Vestland
- District: Voss
- Municipality: Voss Municipality

Area
  - Total: 0.29 km^{2} (0.11 sq mi)
- Elevation: 287 m (942 ft)

Population (2025)
  - Total: 355
  - Density: 1,224/km^{2} (3,170/sq mi)
- Time zone: UTC+01:00 (CET)
  - Summer (DST): UTC+02:00 (CEST)
- Post Code: 5700 Voss

Nordheim is a hamlet and basic statistical unit (grunnkrets) in Voss Municipality in Vestland county, Norway. The settlement lies along Norwegian County Road 5388, also known as Kytesvegen (lit. 'Kyte Road'), just northwest of the hamlet of Kyte, and it is located at an elevation of 297 meters (974 ft).

The 0.29-square-kilometre (72-acre) village has a population (2025) of 355 and a population density of 1,224 inhabitants per square kilometre (3,170/sq mi). Statistics Norway includes the small, neighboring village of Kyte as part of the Nordheim-Kyte urban area.

The settlement was attested as Norem in 1563 and 1611 (and as Noreim in 1695 and Norheim in 1723). The original name is reconstructed as the compound *Norðreimr, from norðr which means 'north' and (h)eimr which means 'home' or 'house'.
