= Basic statistical unit (Norway) =

The basic statistical unit (Norwegian: Grunnkrets) is a type of statistical unit used by Statistics Norway to provide stable and coherent geographical units for regional statistics in Norway. Basic statistical units are subdivisions of municipalities (they never include land in more than one municipality), and cover generally homogeneous areas. Most basic statistical units include a few hundred inhabitants, but as their borders are near constant, this can vary widely over time, Presentation of regional statistics. The Central Statistical Office uses this term to provide a statistical basis for analyses, management and planning at the municipal and regional levels. There are approximately 14,000 basic counties in Norway. The basic circuits should be stable over a reasonable period of time, and to consist of geographically adjacent areas, and to be as synchronous as possible in terms of their nature, Its economic base and communication conditions. Subdivisions are located, Between the municipality and the basic departments, so that detailed data can be raised to the basic department levels, to a higher level. The focus is on the subdivisions that are related to each other, Naturally, in terms of communication, which forms, if possible, a natural unit.
