= Gulsvik =

City in Norway

Coordinates: 60°23′N 9°35′E

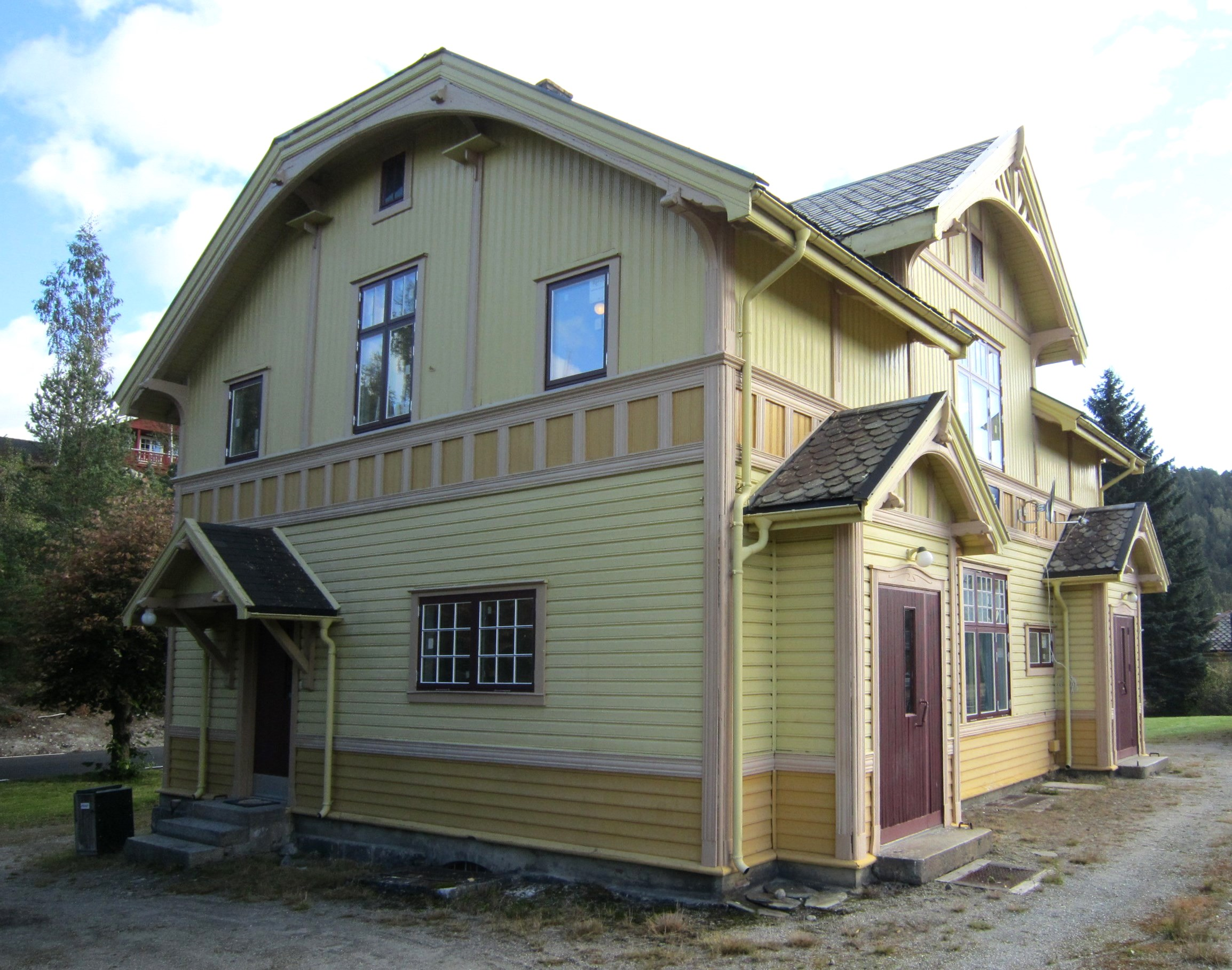
Gulvsvik Rail Station

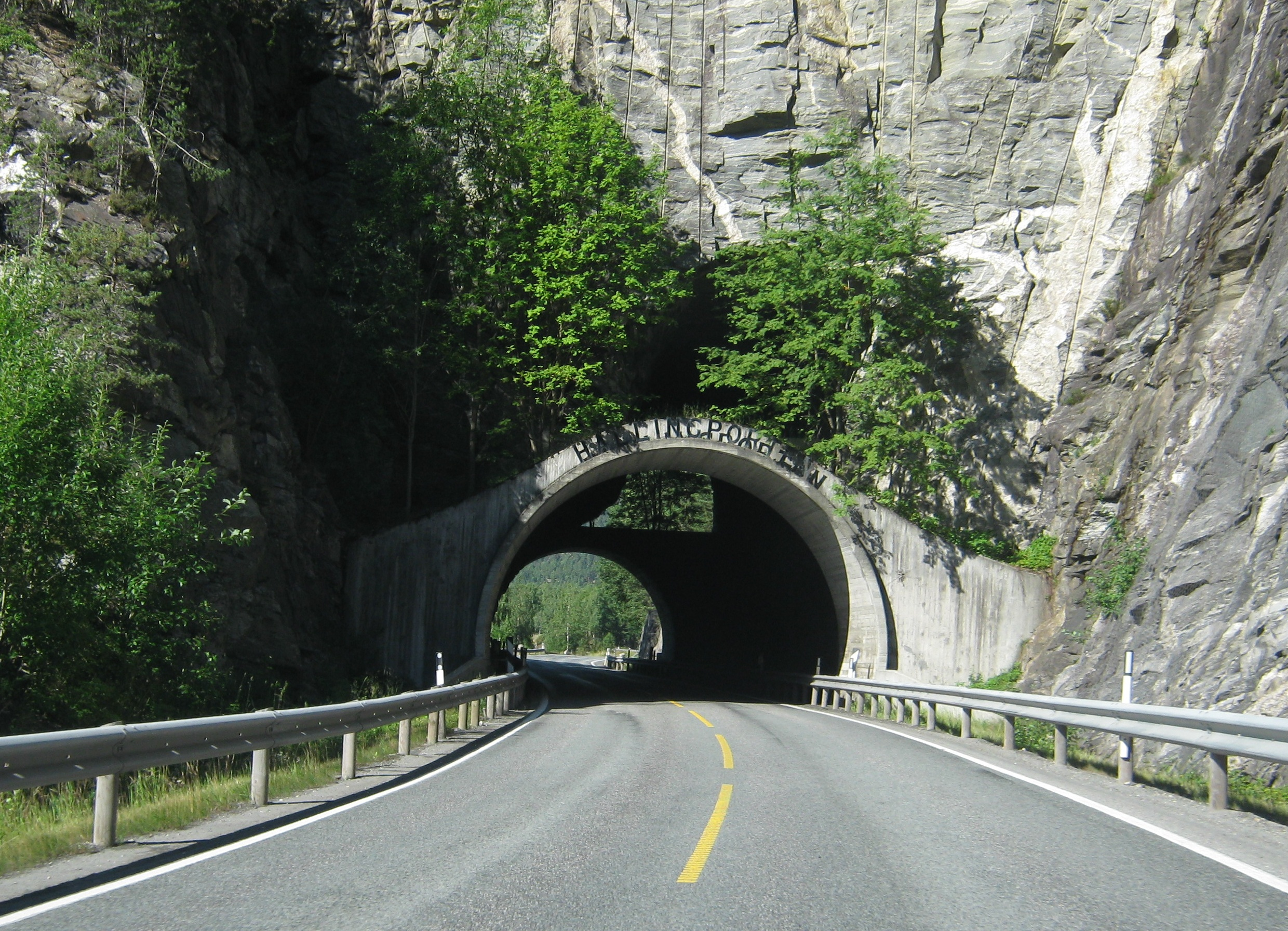
Hallingporten

Gulsvik is a village in the municipality of Flå in Buskerud, Norway. It is located in Hallingdal at the north end of Lake Krøderen.

The name Gulsvik is connected to the original farm of Gulsvik. The Gulsvik farm was known from the Middle Ages, when the owners were among the most prominent people in lower Hallingdal.

In the late Middle Ages, the owners of Gulsvik farm were noblemen in allegiance to the king of Norway. The old Gulsvik clan is said to be one of the most widespread families in lower Buskerud, descending from a Birkebeiner soldier in the service of King Sverre. Dating from 1430, the farm became divided, as time passed into upper, middle and lower Gulsvik (Gulsvik nordre, Gulsvik mellom and Gulsvik søndre).

This area is called Gulsvik Farthing (Gulsvikfjerdingen) and contains a number of farms. The wider area south of Gulsvik was settled just as early, and the proper name of the area is Southern Flå Municipality, reckoned from the border of Krødsherad up to the end of Lake Krøderen (Innsjøen Krøderen). The Gulsvik Farthing is to the north, close up to Hallingdal gate, an entrance into the valley of Hallingdal.

== Climate ==
Climate data for Gulsvik II 1991–2020 (142 m, avg high/low 2008-2025)
Month	Jan	Feb	Mar	Apr	May	Jun	Jul	Aug	Sep	Oct	Nov	Dec	Year
Mean daily maximum °C (°F)	−2.4 (27.7)	0.3 (32.5)	6.3 (43.3)	12.2 (54.0)	17.9 (64.2)	22.2 (72.0)	23.9 (75.0)	21.2 (70.2)	16.8 (62.2)	9.5 (49.1)	3.2 (37.8)	−1.7 (28.9)	10.8 (51.4)
Daily mean °C (°F)	−5.2 (22.6)	−4.2 (24.4)	0 (32)	5 (41)	10.2 (50.4)	14.7 (58.5)	17.1 (62.8)	15.3 (59.5)	11.1 (52.0)	5 (41)	0 (32)	−4.4 (24.1)	5.4 (41.7)
Mean daily minimum °C (°F)	−9.2 (15.4)	−7.7 (18.1)	−3.8 (25.2)	0.2 (32.4)	5 (41)	9.9 (49.8)	12.2 (54.0)	10.7 (51.3)	7.5 (45.5)	2.4 (36.3)	−2 (28)	−7.5 (18.5)	1.5 (34.6)
Average precipitation mm (inches)	61.5 (2.42)	38.4 (1.51)	40.3 (1.59)	44.3 (1.74)	65.6 (2.58)	73.7 (2.90)	94.4 (3.72)	102.6 (4.04)	78 (3.1)	89.7 (3.53)	83.6 (3.29)	52.7 (2.07)	824.8 (32.49)
Average precipitation days (≥ 1.0 mm)	9	7	7	7	8	9	11	11	8	10	10	9	106
Source 1: NOAA
Source 2: Seklima (avg highs/lows)
