= Raundalen =

Valley in Vestland, Norway

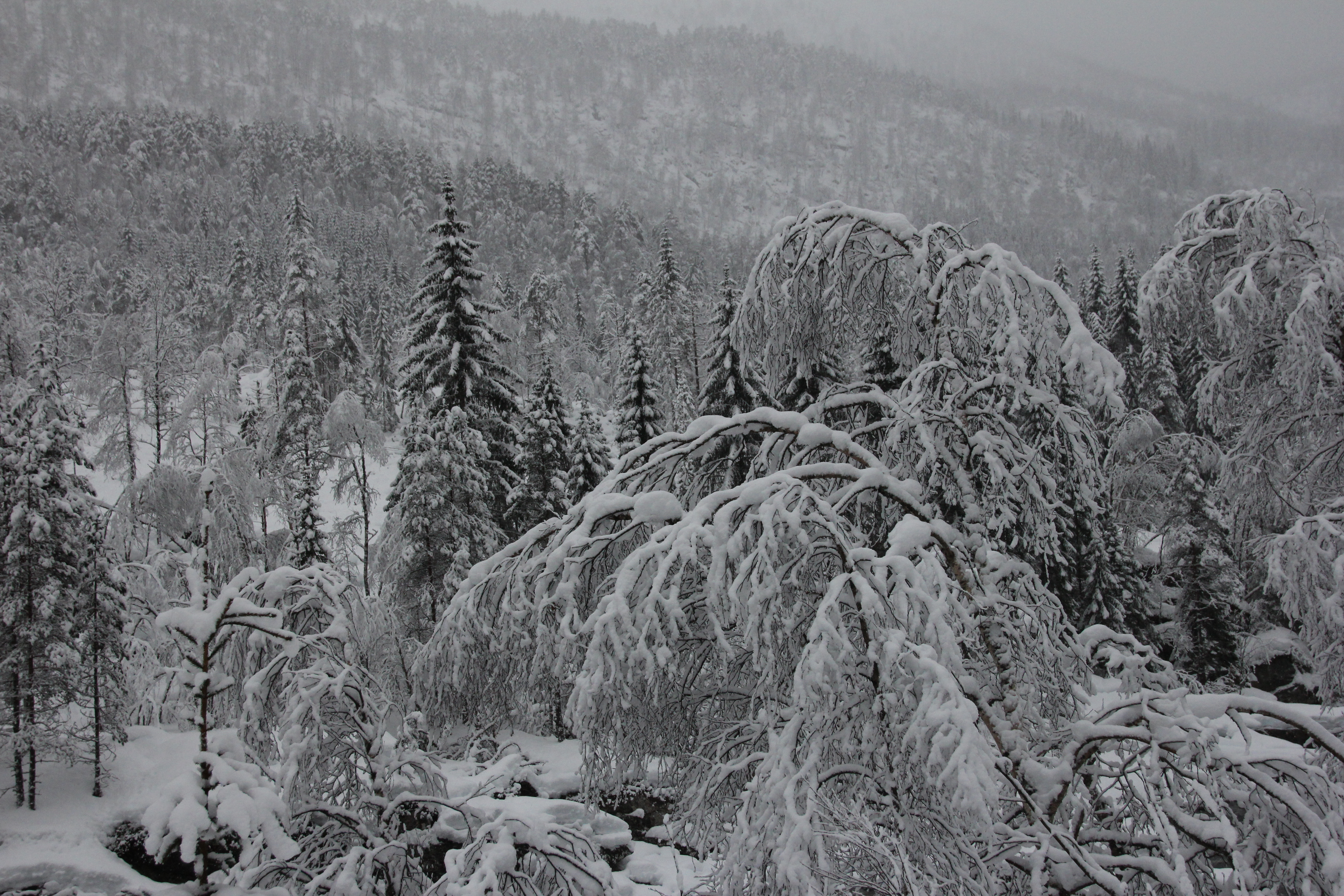
- View of the forest in the valley
- Length: 25 kilometres (16 mi) E-W

Geology
- Type: River valley

Geography
- Location: Vestland, Norway
- Coordinates: 60°40′44″N 06°33′42″E
- River: Raundalselvi

Location
- Interactive map of Raundalen

Raundalen (English: Raun Valley) is a valley in Vestland county, Norway. The 25-kilometre (16 mi) long valley stretches from Uppsetedalen in the northwest corner of Ulvik Municipality all the way to Urdland in central Voss Municipality, just northeast of Vossevangen. The Bergen Line railway and County Road 307 (also known as Raundalsvegen, 'Raun Valley Road') run through the center of the valley, past the villages of Urdland, Skiple, Reimegrend, and Mjølfjell.
