= Voss (surname) =

Voss or Voß (in German) means fox in Low German and is a surname.

Notable people and fictional characters with the surname Voss, Voß, von Voss or von Voß include:

== A ==
- Aasta Voss (1914–1994), Norwegian actress
- Alain Voss (1946–2011), Franco-Brazilian comics artist
- Alex Voss (1858–1906), American baseball player
- Andreas Voss (disambiguation)
- Andrew Voss (born 1960), Australian television sports presenter
- Arno Voss (1821–1888), American politician
- Aurel Voss (1845–1931), German mathematician
- Axel Voss (born 1963), German lawyer and politician

== B ==
- Barbara Voss (born 1967), American historical archaeologist
- Ben Voss (born 1973), South African comedian, actor and satirist
- Bill Voss (1943–2023), American baseball player
- Brandon Voss (born 1978), American journalist
- Brett Voss (born 1978), Australian football player, brother of Michael
- Brian Voss (born 1958), American bowler

== C ==
- Carl Voss (1907–1993), American ice hockey player
- Catalin Voss (born 1995), German inventor and entrepreneur
- Charles H. Voss, American politician
- Christina Voß (born 1952), East German handball player
- Christopher Voss (born 1957), American FBI hostage negotiator
- Clair H. Voss (1920–1999), American lawyer and judge
- Conrad Voss Bark (1913–2000), writer and correspondent for the BBC and the Times

== D ==
- Daniel Voß (born 1971), German water polo player
- David Voss, Canadian art forger

== E ==
- Ed Voss (c. 1922–1953), American basketball player
- Eduard Voss (1884–1974), German entomologist
- Edward Groesbeck Voss, (1929–2012), American botanist and lepidopterist
- Egon Voss (born 1938), German musicologist
- Ernst Voss (1842–1920), German shipbuilder, co-founder of Blohm+Voss

== F ==
- Fred Voss (1952–2025), American poet and novelist
- Friedrich Voss (1872–1953), German civil engineer
- Friedrich Voss (composer) (born 1930), German composer and pianist

== G ==
- Gert Voss (1941–2014), German actor
- Gilbert L. Voss (1918–1989), American conservationist and oceanographer
- Gordon Voss (1938–2017), American politician
- Grace Voss Frederick (1905–2009), née Voss, American actress

== H ==
- Hans Voss (1894–1973), German rear admiral
- Hans-Erich Voss (1897–1969), German World War II vice admiral
- Heath Voss (born 1978), American motocross racer
- Henry Voss, German-born American architect
- Hermann Voss (disambiguation)
- Holger Voss, German internet user sued for a sarcastic comment he made about the September 11, 2001, terrorist attacks

== I ==
- Isaac Vossius (1618–1689), sometimes anglicized as Isaac Voss, Dutch philologist and manuscript collector, son of Gerhard

== J ==
- James Voss (disambiguation)
- Janice E. Voss (1956–2012), American astronaut
- Joan Voss (born 1940), American politician
- Johann Heinrich Voss (1751–1826), German poet and translator
- Johanne Voss (1868–1946), Norwegian actress
- John Voss (disambiguation)
- Josef Voß (1937–2009), German Roman Catholic bishop
- Julia Voss (born 1974), German journalist
- Julie von Voss (1766–1789), German lady-in-waiting and a bigamous morganatic spouse of King Frederick William II of Prussia
- Julius von Voss (1768–1832), German writer

== K ==
- Katrina Voss, American meteorologist
- Kim Voss, American sociologist
- Konrad Voss (1928–2017), German mathematician and professor
- Kurt Voss (born 1963), American film director

== L ==
- Lloyd Voss (1942–2007), American football defensive end

== M ==
- Martin Voss (born 1967), Danish retired athlete
- Michael Voss (born 1975), Australian football player and coach, brother of Brett

== N ==
- Neil Voss (born 1974), American video game composer
- Nick Voss, Australian music artist
- Nils Voss (1886–1969), Norwegian gymnast

== O ==
- Olav Voss (1864–1912), Norwegian actor

== P ==
- Patrick Voss (born 2003), Australian rules footballer
- Paul Voß (born 1986), German road racing cyclist
- Perrie Voss, Canadian actress
- Peter Voss (1897–1976), German SS non-commissioned officer and commander of the Auschwitz crematoria and gas chambers
- Peter Voß (1891–1979), German film actor
- Philip Voss (1936–2020), British actor
- Ralph Voss (1860–1900), English cricketer
- Raoul Voss (born 1983), German association football coach
- Richard Voss (1851–1918), German dramatist and novelist
- Richard Voss (cricketer) (1880–1948), English cricketer
- Robert Voss (born 1953), British businessman
- Roberta Voss (born 1965), American politician

== S ==
- Sarah Voss (born 1999), German artistic gymnast
- Siegfried Voß (1940–2011), German actor
- Skipper Voss (born 1944), American rodeo bullfighter
- Sophie Marie von Voß (1729–1814), German lady in waiting and memoirist

== T ==
- Torolf Voss (1877–1943), Norwegian conductor and composer
- Torsten Voss (born 1963), German athlete

== V ==
- Valentin Voss (1880–1964), Norwegian lawyer and civil servant
- Victor Voss (1868–1936), German tennis player
- Vida de Voss, Namibian feminist activist

== W ==
- Wally Voss (1958–1992), American bass player
- Walter Voss (disambiguation)
- Werner Voss (1897–1917), German World War I flying ace
- Willi Voss (born 1944), German screenwriter and journalist
- William Voss (1847–1921), German-American immigrant, banker and politician
- Willy Voss (born 1952), German karateka
- Wolfgard Voß (1926–2020), German gymnast

== Compound surnames ==
- Anke Voss-Hubbard, archivist, writer and feminist
- Carl Voss-Schrader (1880–1955), Finnish colonel, business director and lawyer
- Felicia Voss-Shafiq (born 1980), Canadian sitting volleyball player
- Julian Voss-Andreae (born 1970), German sculptor
- Martha Voß-Zietz (1871–1961), German conservative, women's rights activist, suffragist, nationalist and writer
- Martina Voss-Tecklenburg (born 1967), German football manager and former player

== Fictional characters ==
- Johann Ulrich Voss, one of the protagonists of the novel Voss
- Scott Voss, in the Quake IV video game
- the protagonist of Die Sehnsucht der Veronika Voss, a 1982 German film

== See also ==
- Voss (disambiguation)
- Vos (surname)
- Foss (disambiguation)
