= Vossius =

Vossius may refer to:

- Gerardus Vossius (1577–1649), a Dutch humanist
- Dionysius Vossius (1612–1633), a Dutch translator, son of Gerardus Vossius
- Isaac Vossius (1618–1689), a Dutch scholar, son of Gerardus Vossius
- Vossius Gymnasium in Amsterdam, named after Gerardus Vossius
- Adolf Vossius, German ophthalmologist
- Vossius ring, a form of eye trauma
- Vossius (restaurant), a former Dutch Michelin starred restaurant
- Vossius (beetle), a beetle genus in the tribe Tropiphorini

== See also ==
- Voss (surname), the Anglicized form of Vossius
- Voss (disambiguation)
