= Voss =

Voss or VOSS may refer to:

== Arts and entertainment ==
- Voss (novel), a novel by Patrick White
  - Voss (opera), an opera by Richard Meale based on the novel
- Voss Literary Prize, an annual Australian award
- "Voss" (song), a 2018 song from the album Bad Vibes Forever by XXXTentacion featuring Sauce Walka and Carnage
- Voss (collection), a high-fashion collection by Alexander McQueen

== Businesses ==
- Voss (brand), a Norwegian bottled water brand
- VOSS Solutions, a British software company

== Places ==
=== Vestland County, Norway ===
- Voss (traditional district), Vestland county, Norway
- Voss Municipality
  - Voss or Vossevangen, a village within Voss Municipality
- Voss Airport, Bømoen, a general aviation airport
- Voss Church
- Voss Folk High School

=== United States ===
- Voss, North Dakota, an unincorporated community
- Voss, Texas, an unincorporated community
- Voss Creek, Missouri

== Transportation ==
- Voss Line, a Norwegian railway
- Changan VOSS, a Chinese concept compact MPV
- Voßstraße or Voss Strasse, a street in Berlin, Germany
- Voss Station, a railway station in Vossevangen, Norway

== Other uses ==
- Voss (surname), a list of people and fictional characters
- 23473 Voss, a main belt asteroid
