= Norwegian County Road 5390 =

Road in Vestland, Norway

County Road 5390

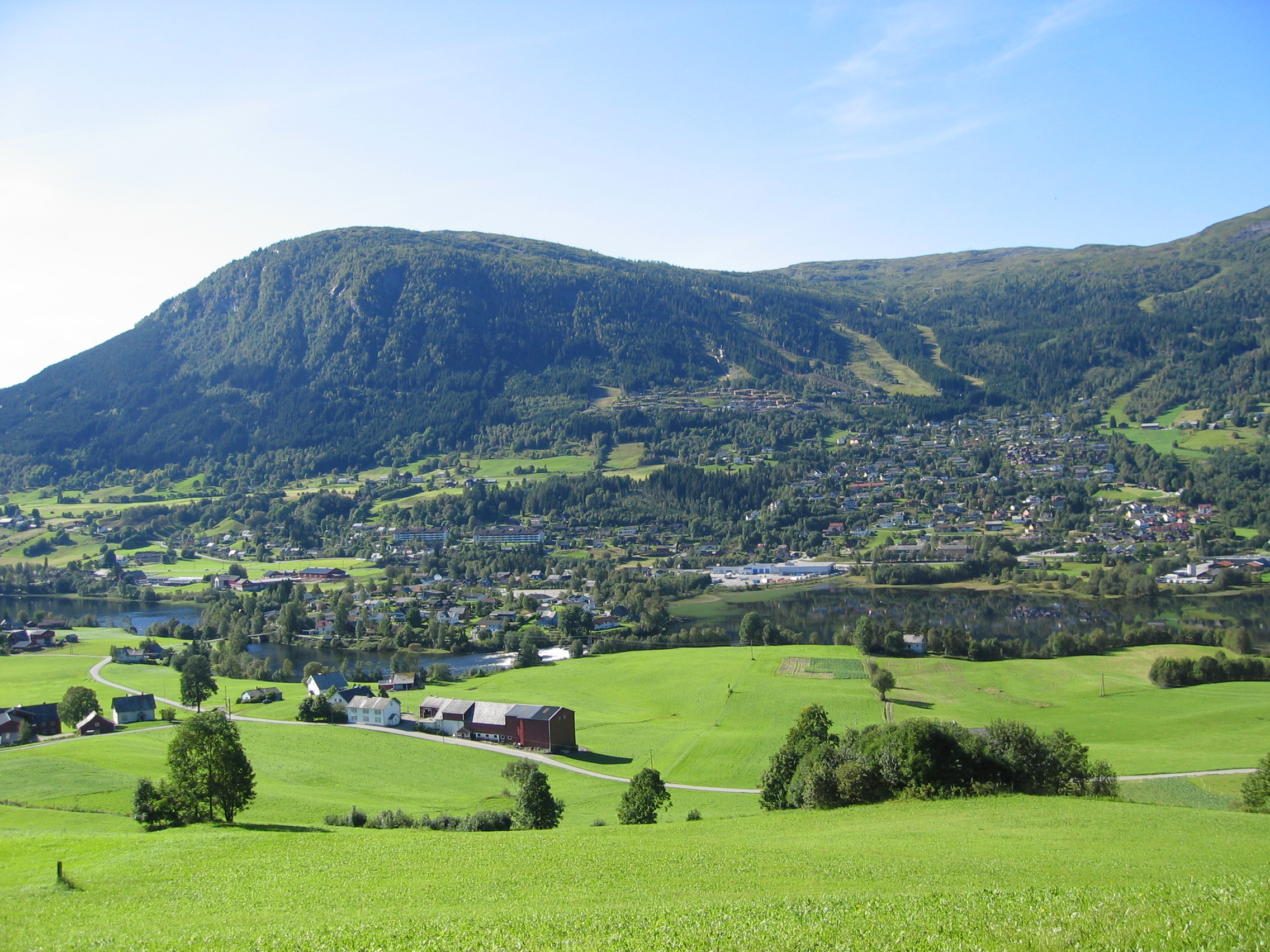
- County Road 5390 in the foreground at Kvitheim

Route information
- Length: 13.2 km (8.2 mi)

Major junctions
- South end: E16 at Skulestad, Voss Municipality
- Fv5390 at Nedkvitno, Voss Municipality
- North end: E16 at Tvinno, Voss Municipality

Location
- Country: Norway
- Counties: Vestland

Highway system
- Roads in Norway; National Roads; County Roads

Norwegian County Road 5390 (Norwegian: Fylkesvei 5390) is a county road in Voss Municipality in Vestland county, Norway.

The road branches off from European Route E16 in Skulestad near the village of Borstrondi, passes through Kvitheim, and continues 10.9 kilometers (6.8 mi) to the northwest along the eastern shore of Lønavatnet (Lake Løno) before rejoining European Route E16 at Tvinno. Midway along this route, there is a 2.3-kilometer (1.4 mi) spur at Nedkvitno that runs south to Nordheim (also known as Norheim), creating a connection with County Road 5388. Together with the spur, the total length of the road is 13.2 kilometers (8.2 mi).

The section of the road south of Nedkvitno is also named Nedkvitnesvegen ('Nedkvitno Headland Road'), and the section to the north and the spur are named Reppavegen ('Reppen Road') after the village of Reppen.

The road was re-numbered in 2019 because Hordaland and Sogn og Fjordane counties were scheduled to merge into Vestland county and there were county roads in both counties with the same number. This road previously was County Road 309.
