= Lønavatnet =

Lake in Voss, Norway

- Interactive map of Lønavatnet
- Location: Voss Municipality, Vestland
- Coordinates: 60.6831°N 6.4748°E
- Basin countries: Norway
- Max. length: 3.7 kilometres (2.3 mi)
- Max. width: 1 kilometre (0.62 mi)
- Surface area: 2.91 km^{2} (1.12 sq mi)
- Average depth: 12 m (39 ft)
- Max. depth: 27 m (89 ft)
- Shore length^{1}: 8.37 kilometres (5.20 mi)
- Surface elevation: 76 metres (249 ft)
- References: NVE
- ^{1} Shore length is not a well-defined measure.

Lønavatnet is a lake in Voss Municipality in Vestland county, Norway. The 2.91-square-kilometre (1.12 sq mi) long lake lies along the river Strandaelvi which runs from the village of Vinje south to the large village of Vossevangen. The lake lies about 4 kilometres (2.5 mi) north of the village of Vossevangen, with the European route E16 highway running along the western shore and Norwegian County Road 309 along the eastern shore.

== See also ==
- List of lakes in Norway
