= Anna Paulson =

Anna Paulson may refer to:

- Anna Paulson (footballer)
- Anna Paulson (economist)

== See also ==
- Anna Paulsen, Norwegian actress
