= Signe Indahl-Voss =

Norwegian actress, singer, and dancer

- Born: June 14, 1889; Kristiania (now Oslo), Norway
- Died: November 10, 1965 (aged 76); Oslo, Norway
- Occupations: Actress; dancer; singer
- Spouse: Torolf Voss
- Parents: Marthinius Indahl (father); Christiane Bjerke (mother)

Signe Elvira Indahl-Voss (née Indahl, June 14, 1889 – November 10, 1965) was a Norwegian actress, singer, and dancer. She appeared in productions at Oslo's Central Theater for several decades.

== Family ==
Signe Indahl-Voss was the daughter of the police constable, postal worker, and brewery worker Marthinius Indahl and Christiane Bjerke. In 1921 she married the conductor and composer Torolf Voss.

== Life and work ==
Signe Indahl-Voss performed at the Central Theater from 1909 to 1940. Her official debut was on December 19, 1909, in Vilhelm Dybwad's operetta Taterblod (Gypsy Blood), in which she played the role of Eldri after Bokken Lasson. As early as 1908, however, she had appeared in the same venue in Veslefrik med Felen (Little Freddy and His Fiddle) by Harald Alfsen and Torolf Voss, in addition to performing several small roles, including a Spanish solo dance in Die Fledermaus by Johann Strauss Jr. A review of her performance in Die Fledermaus wrote that "The young lady has a lot of talent. She created great joy."

In the summer of 1913, Indahl-Voss participated in the Norwegian Actors' Equity Association's Apekatten cabaret in the Christiania Tivoli amusement park. Late in her career she was also engaged with the Riksteatret. She also appeared in the film Sankt Hans fest in 1947.

== Selected roles ==
- Berit-Anna in Veslefrik med Felen (Little Freddy and His Fiddle) by Harald Alfsen and Torolf Voss (Central Theater, 1908)
- Eldri in Taterblod (Gypsy Blood) by Vilhelm Dybwad (Central Theater, 1909)
- Maja in Sommereventyr (Summer Adventure) by Per Reidarson (Central Theater, 1910)
- Irma in the operetta Die keusche Susanne (Chaste Susanne) by Jean Gilbert and Georg Okonkowski (Central Theater, 1911)
- Lucy in Papa by Gaston Arman de Caillavet and Robert de Flers (Central Theater, 1912)
- Minka in Die Försterchristl (The Girl and the Kaiser) by Bernhard Buchbinder (Central Theater, 1912)
- Violette in L'Hôtel du libre échange (Free Exchange Hotel) by Georges Feydeau and Maurice Desvallières (Central Theater, 1913)
- Sofie in La Présidente (The President) by Maurice Hennequin and Pierre Veber (Central Theater, 1913)
- Gretchen in the operetta Miss Hook of Holland by Paul Rubens and Austen Hurgon (Central Theater, 1914)
- The chambermaid Marie in the comedy The Czarina by Melchior Lengyel and Lajos Bíró (Central Theater, 1915)
- Sarah in Szibill (Sybil) by Miksa Bródy and Ferencz Martos (Central Theater, 1916)
- Mrs. Starck in Kamraterna (Comrades) by August Strindberg (Central Theater, 1918)
- Bichette in the comedy The Czarina by Melchior Lengyel and Lajos Bíró (Central Theater, 1919)
- Hanne in the operetta Der Vetter aus Dingsda (The Cousin from Nowhere) by Eduard Künneke, Herman Haller and Fritz Oliven (Central Theater, 1922)
- Petruschka in the operetta Der letzte Walzer (The Last Waltz) by Oscar Straus (Central Theater, 1922)
- Juanita in the operetta Frasquita by Franz Lehár (Central Theater, 1925)
- Rose in La Femme X (Madame X) by Alexandre Bisson (Central Theater, 1928)
