= Ørneberget Station =

Railway station in Voss, Norway

Ørneberget
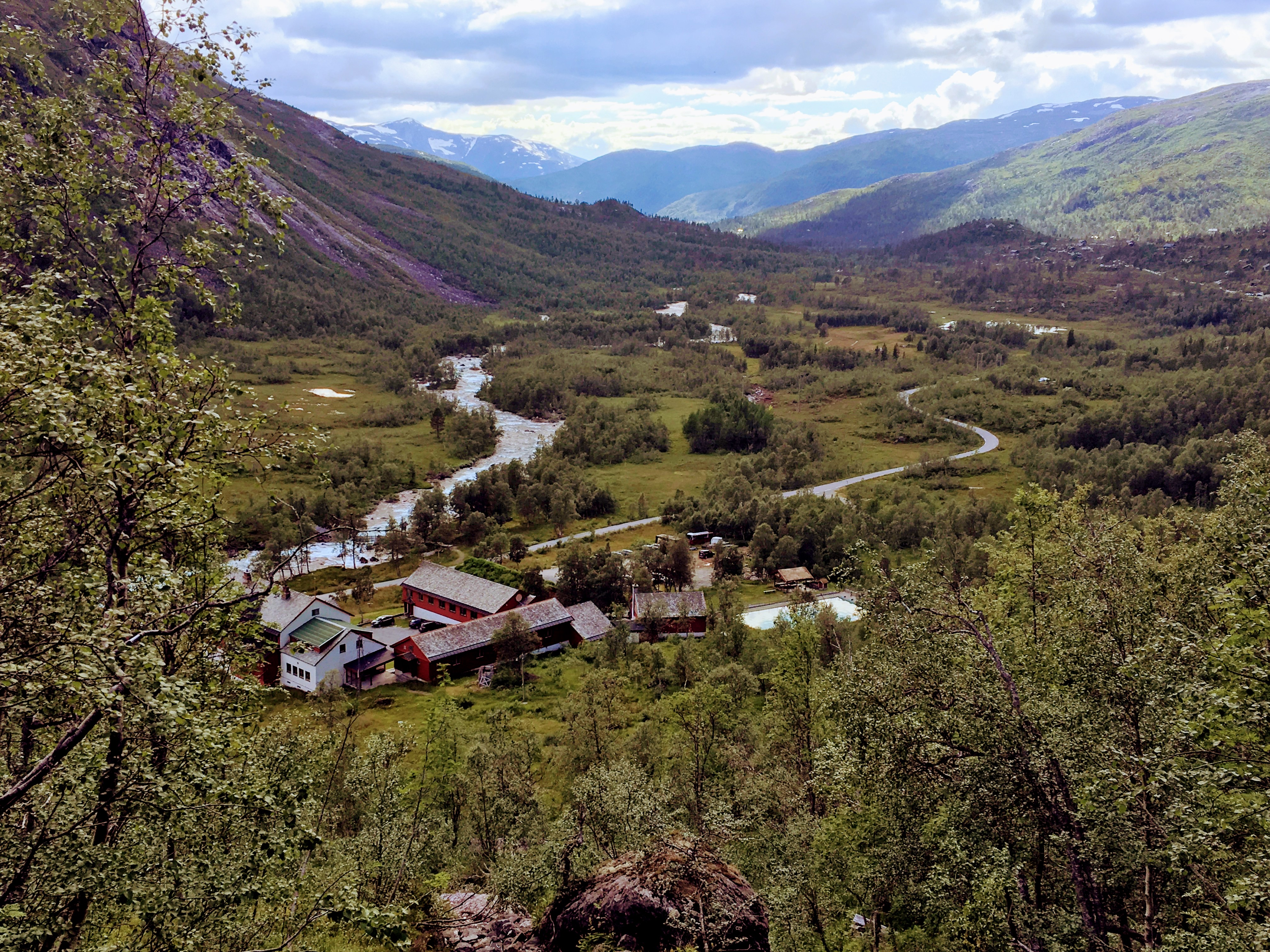
- View of the Mjølfjell Youth Hostel from Ørneberget station Credit: Magnus Aasen Aukland

General information
- Location: Mjølfjell, Voss Municipality; Norway
- Coordinates: 60.7031°N 6.94139°E
- Owner: Bane NOR
- Operator: Vy Tog
- Line: Bergensbanen
- Distance: 347.50 kilometres (215.93 mi)
- Platforms: 1

History
- Opened: 1958
Location

Ørneberget Station (Norwegian: Ørneberget holdeplass) is a railway station on the Bergensbanen railway line located in the Mjølfjell area in Voss Municipality in Vestland county, Norway. The station is served by the Bergen Commuter Rail, operated by Vy Tog, with up to five daily departures in each direction. The station was opened in 1958. The surrounding area is dominantly recreational, with many cabins.

Preceding station		Following station
Ljosanbotn	Bergensbanen	Vieren
Preceding station	Local trains	Following station
Ljosanbotn	Bergen Commuter Rail	Vieren
