= Mjølfjell =

Village in Voss Municipality, Norway

- Village
- Interactive map of Mjølfjell
- Coordinates: 60.69396°N 6.84048°E
- Country: Norway
- Region: Western Norway
- County: Vestland
- District: Voss
- Municipality: Voss Municipality
- Elevation: 628 m (2,060 ft)
- Time zone: UTC+01:00 (CET)
  - Summer (DST): UTC+02:00 (CEST)
- Post Code: 5706 Voss

Mjølfjell is a village area located in the eastern part of the Raundalen valley in Voss Municipality in Vestland county, Norway. Mjølfjell is served by the train station on the Bergen Line, Mjølfjell Station, both local trains from Vossavangen and (less frequently) the Bergen to Oslo express trains make regular stops there. Mjølfjell has a grocery store, a chapel, and a military training facility. There are about 500 cabins in the area that are used for vacationers.

== Media gallery ==
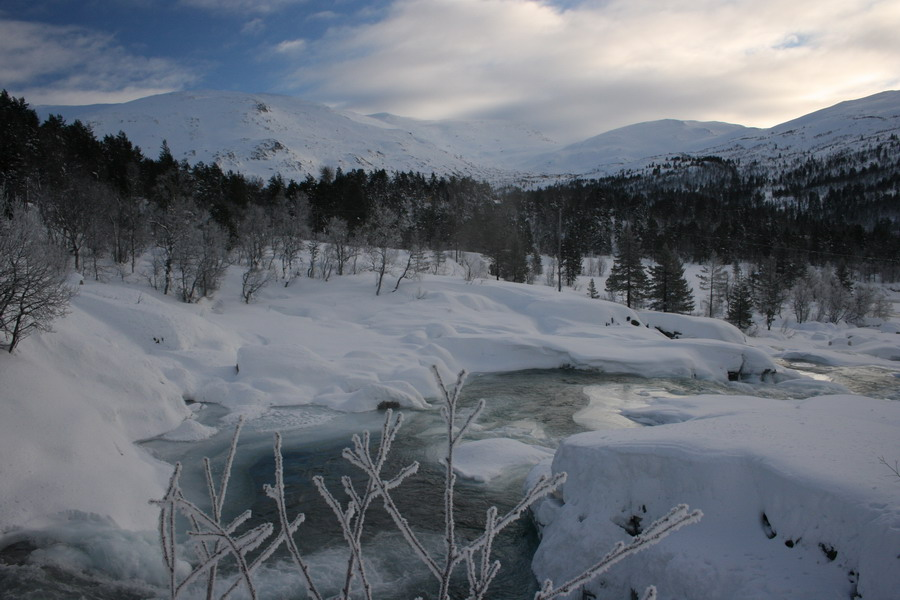
Mjølfjell

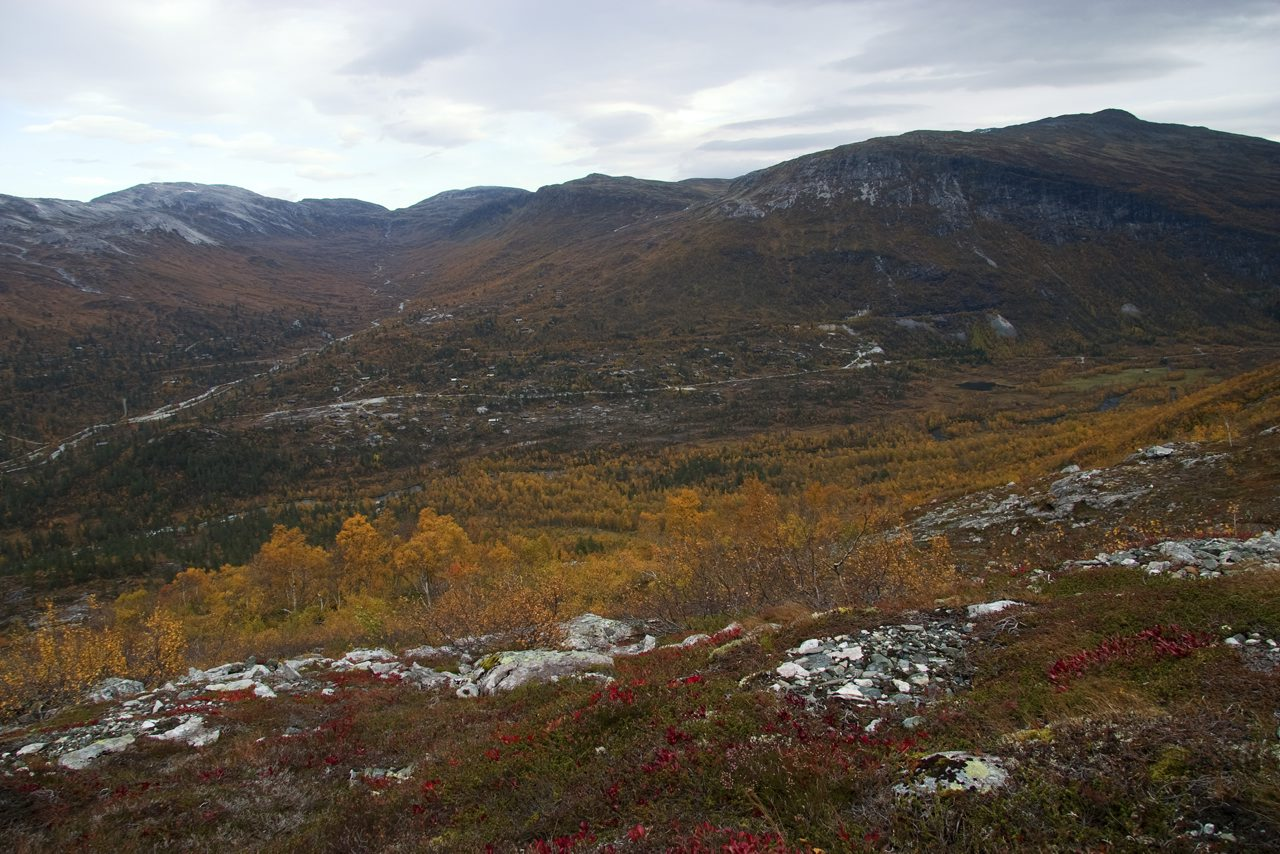
Autumn at Mjølfjell

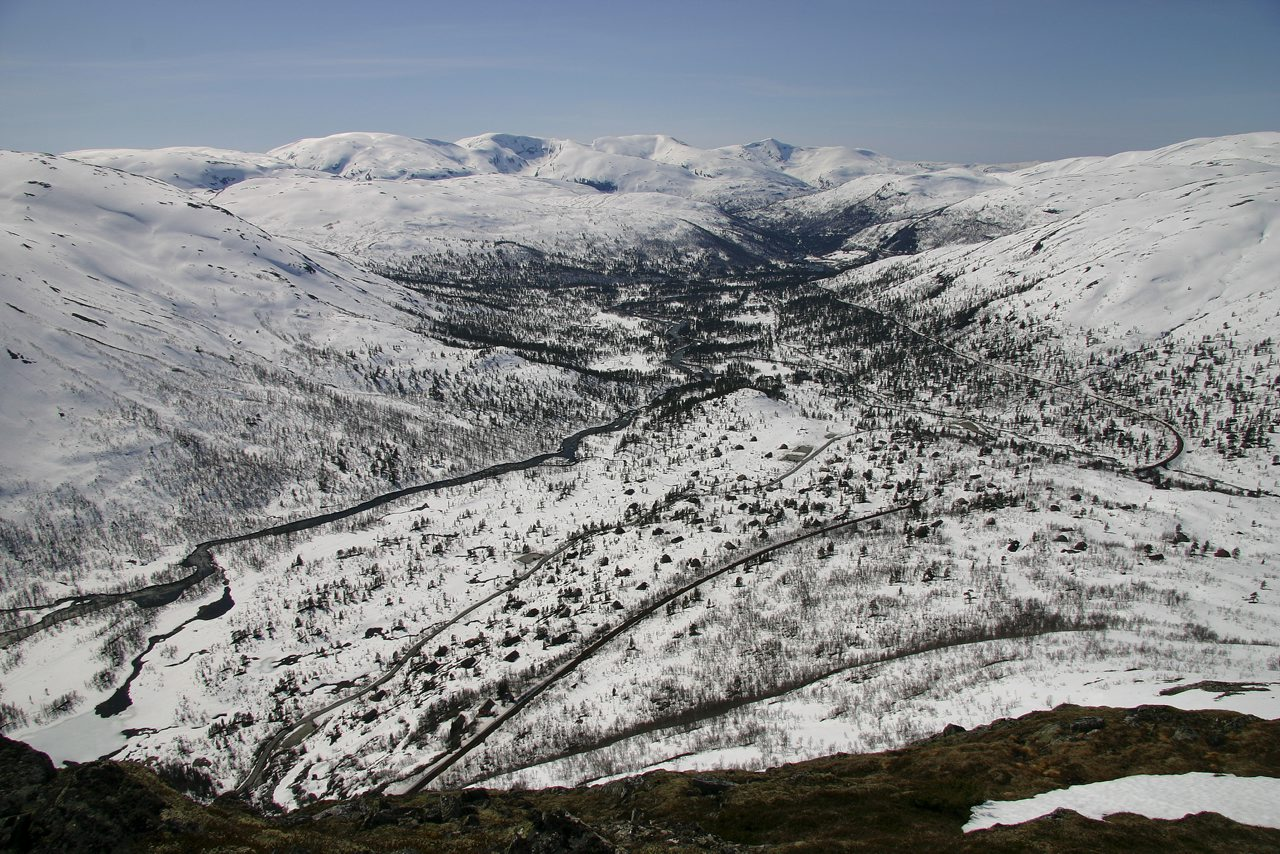
Winter at Mjølfjell

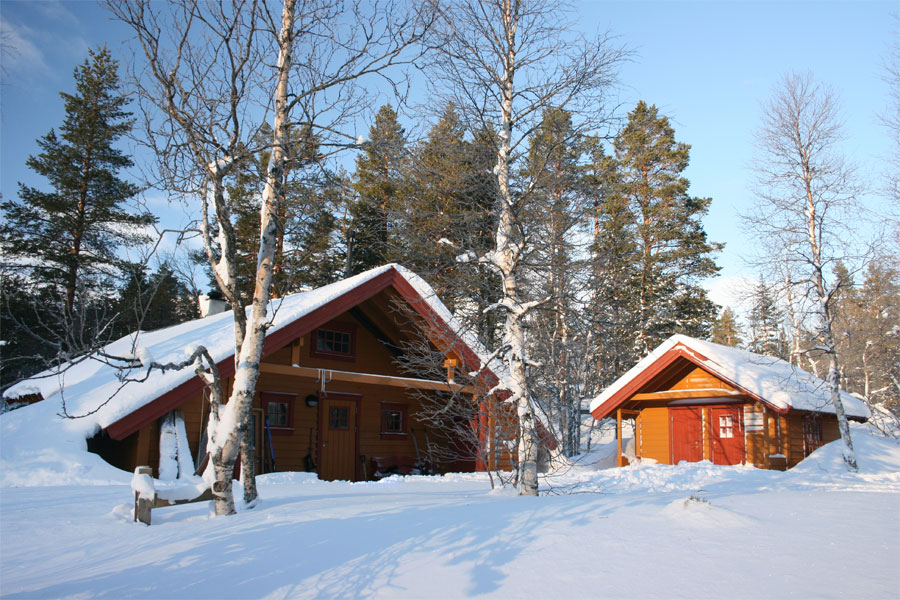
Classic Mjølfjell cabin
