= Vieren Station =

Railway station in Ulvik, Norway

Coordinates: 60.7092°N 6.97944°E

Vieren

General information
- Location: Vieren, Ulvik Municipality; Norway
- Owner: Bane NOR
- Operator: Vy Tog
- Line: Bergensbanen
- Distance: 344.80 km (214.25 mi)
- Platforms: 1

History
- Opened: 1948
Location

Vieren Station (Norwegian: Vieren holdeplass) is a railway station on the Bergensbanen railway line. The stop is located at Vieren in the northwestern corner of Ulvik Municipality in Vestland county, Norway. The station is served by the Bergen Commuter Rail, operated by Vy Tog, with up to five daily departures in each direction. The station was opened in 1948. The surrounding area is dominantly recreational, with many cabins.

| Preceding station | | Following station |
|---|---|---|
| Ørneberget | Bergensbanen | Upsete |
| Preceding station | Local trains | Following station |
| Ørneberget | Bergen Commuter Rail | Upsete |
