= Upsete Station =

Railway station in Aurland, Norway

Upsete Station Upsete stasjon
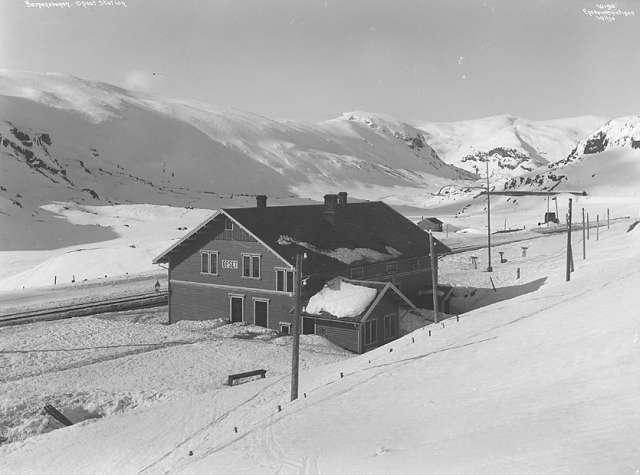
- View of the station (1909)

General information
- Location: Upsete, Aurland Municipality; Norway
- Coordinates: 60.725556°N 7.0125°E
- Elevation: 850.2 metres (2,789 ft)
- System: Railway station
- Owner: Bane NOR
- Operator: Vy
- Line: Bergen Line
- Distance: 342.15 kilometres (212.60 mi)
- Platforms: 1

History
- Opened: 1908
Location

Upsete Station (Norwegian: Upsete stasjon) is a railway station on the Bergen Line located at Upsete in Aurland Municipality, Norway. The station is served by the Bergen Commuter Rail, operated by Vy Tog, with up to five daily departures in each direction. The station was opened in 1908 as part of the Bergen Line. The surrounding area is dominantly recreational, with many cabins. The rallarvegen road runs past the station.

Preceding station		Following station
Vieren	Bergensbanen	Myrdal
Preceding station	Local trains	Following station
Vieren	Bergen Commuter Rail	Myrdal
