= Ljosanbotn Station =

Railway station in Voss, Norway

Ljosanbotn

General information
- Location: Ljosanbotn, Voss Municipality; Norway
- Coordinates: 60.7089°N 6.90083°E
- Owner: Bane NOR
- Operator: Vy Tog
- Line: Bergensbanen
- Distance: 349.37 kilometres (217.09 mi)
- Platforms: 1

History
- Opened: 1948
Location

Ljosanbotn Station (Norwegian: Ljosanbotn stasjon) is a railway station on the Bergensbanen railway line located at Ljosanbotn in the Raundalen valley in Voss Municipality in Vestland county, Norway. The station is served by the Bergen Commuter Rail, operated by Vy Tog, with up to five daily departures in each direction. The station was opened in 1948. The surrounding area is dominantly recreational, with many cabins.

Preceding station		Following station
Mjølfjell	Bergensbanen	Ørneberget
Preceding station	Local trains	Following station
Mjølfjell	Bergen Commuter Rail	Ørneberget
