= Kvitheim =

Village in Voss Municipality, Norway

- Village
- Interactive map of Kvitheim
- Coordinates: 60.66054°N 6.45392°E
- Country: Norway
- Region: Western Norway
- County: Vestland
- District: Voss
- Municipality: Voss Municipality
- Elevation: 110 m (360 ft)
- Time zone: UTC+01:00 (CET)
  - Summer (DST): UTC+02:00 (CEST)
- Post Code: 5710 Skulestadmo

Kvitheim is a small, rural village in Voss Municipality in Vestland county, Norway. Kvitheim is located north of the municipal centre, Vossavangen. The village of Borstrondi lies just across the lake Melsvatnet to the west. Norwegian County Road 5390 runs through the village, and connects to the European route E16 in Borstrondi.
