= Tanya Zanish-Belcher =

American archivist

Tanya Zanish-Belcher is an American archivist and associate professor. She is currently the director of special collections and archives at the Z. Smith Reynolds Library at Wake Forest University in Winston-Salem, North Carolina. She specializes in women's, gender and sexuality studies and has written several books and articles as well as given presentations on these topics. She has been invited to speak on several occasions as an expert historian and archivist across the United States.

== Education ==
In 1983, Zanish-Belcher graduated from Ohio Wesleyan University with a bachelor's degree in history. She later returned to school and earned her master's degree in historical and archival administration from Wright State University in 1990.

== Career ==
From 1989 to 1994, she worked as a special collections archivist and private records archivist at the Alabama Department of Archives and History in Montgomery, Alabama. In 1995, she moved to Iowa and served at the curator for the Archives of Women in Science and Engineering at the Iowa State University Library. Also in 1995, she began teaching at Iowa State and in 1998, became the head of her department. In 1998, she was promoted to head of the Special Collections Department and head of the University Archives at Iowa State, where she remained until 2013.

From 2007 to 2010, she served as president of the board of directors for the YWCA.

In 2013, Zanish-Belcher was named special collections and university archivist at Wake Forest University, where she works today. In 2025 she was also appointed executive director of the Wake Forest Historical Museum.

She has written several books and articles over her career as well as giving lectures and presentations to groups and organizations across the country. At one presentation at the University of Nebraska-Lincoln, she explored access to public records and how it has decreased through budget cuts and censorship. She and Blake Graham, the president of the Academic Activities Committee, explained that open access to archives and records is essential to academic freedom and "encourages research, debate and information gathering."

She has also taught several workshops at conferences at the local and national level.

=== Affiliations ===
Zanish-Belcher is a longtime member of the Society of American Archivists. She has served on and chaired many committees of the SAA, including the nominating committee, Committee on the Status of Women, and the membership committee. She was awarded the SAA Fellowship, their highest accolade, and served on the SAA council from 2012 to 2015. She was elected vice president and president elect of the SAA in 2016 and served as president of the SAA from 2017 to 2018.

She has also been a member of other Archives groups and organizations. She served as the archives month coordinator for the Society of North Carolina Archivists from 2014 to 2016. And she also served with the Midwest Archives Conference as co-chair of the education committee from 2013 to 2015. Zanish-Belcher has also served as MAC vice president and president.

=== Publications ===
- Zanish-Belcher, Tanya, & Voss, Anke. (2013). Perspectives on Women's Archives. Society of American Archivists.
- Zanish-Belcher, Tanya. (2013). 'A Culture of Concealment': Revealing the Records of Human Reproduction. Perspectives on Women's Archives. Society of American Archivists: Chicago, Illinois.
- Zanish-Belcher, Tanya. (2012). The Archives of Women in Science and Engineering and Future Directions for Oral History: Questions for Women Scientists. Centaurus: An International Journal of the History of Science and its Cultural Aspects, 55(4). #
- Zanish-Belcher, Tanya, & Fiegel, Laurie. (2012). Collaboration between the Iowa State University Honors Program and the Special Collections Department (ISU Library). Past as Portal: Teaching Undergraduates Using Special Collections and Archives. Association of College and Research Libraries (ACRL): Chicago, Illinois.
