= James Voss =

James Voss may refer to:

- James S. Voss (born 1949), United States Army officer and NASA astronaut
- James Voss (rugby union) (born 1994), English rugby union player
- James L. Voss (1934–2013), American veterinarian and equine specialist
- James W. Voss, American nuclear engineer
