= Anke Voss-Hubbard =

Anke Voss-Hubbard (born 1964) is an archivist, writer and feminist.

== Early life and education ==
Voss-Hubbard is a native of Germany and holds degrees in history and archival preservation and management. She attended the University of Massachusetts in Amherst for her BA in History and MA in United States Political, Social, and Women's History. She completed her Master's in Library Science at New York State University in Albany.

== Career ==
She became a feminist while studying to be an archivist, and wrote the article "No Documents-No History" for the American Archivist in 1995. In it, she describes the journey of Mary Ritter Beard and attempts to found a "World Center for Women's Archives". In her struggle to prove that women's place in history was of equal importance to men's, Beard argued that documentary evidence can support claims that women were instrumental in all facets of society and not just peace movements. This view caused somewhat of an upheaval in the Suffragette movement at the time, which focused on women's peacekeeping role, and the WCWA folded in 1940. Undaunted, Beard set about finding homes for the collected archives and concentrated on Smith and Radcliffe archival initiatives, and thanks to Margaret Storrs Grierson, Smith now has the Sophia Smith Collection. Voss-Hubbard remarked that the formation of archives often rests with non-archivists and in the words of Beard, that the "stimulation of interest" is possibly the greatest achievement.

After writing her influential article, Voss-Hubbard went on to become a digital collections specialist. She was an assistant editor on the Margaret Sanger Papers Project at Smith College, being instrumental in making the Sanger papers accessible, as well as other documents regarding birth control and other subjects from the Sophia Smith Collection and other archives.

From 1995 to 1999, she worked at the Rockefeller Archive Center in New York City as an archivist and preservation officer. In 2000, she became the Archivist and Special Collections librarian for Illinois Wesleyan University, and remained in that role until 2005. She then became Director of Archives at the Urbana Free Library, and served as an adjunct lecturer at the University of Illinois School of Information Sciences. Since 2019, she has served as the Curator for the Concord Free Public Library.

Voss-Hubbard co-edited the 2013 book Perspectives on Women's Archives with Tanya Zanish-Belcher.
