= Anna Paulsen =

Norwegian actress (1858–1895)

- Born: April 11, 1858; Bergen, Norway
- Died: May 19, 1895 (aged 37); Bergen, Norway
- Resting place: Western Cemetery
- Occupation: Actress
- Years active: 1877–1883
- Spouse: Georg Bernhard von Erpecom
- Parents: Peter Olay Paulsen (father); Johanne Severine Jørgensen (mother)
- Relatives: Johanne Voss

Anna Hansine Sigvardine Paulsen (April 11, 1858 – May 19, 1895) was a Norwegian actress.

Anna Paulsen was the daughter of the carpenter Peter Olay Paulsen and Johanne Severine Jørgensen, and the sister of the actress Johanne Voss (1868–1946). On August 2, 1883, she married the factory owner and shipowner Georg Bernhard von Erpecom (1858–1912).

Anna Paulsen debuted on January 22, 1877, in the role of Emilie in Soldaterløier (Soldiers' Pranks) by Jens Christian Hostrup at the National Theater in her home town of Bergen. She remained engaged with this theater until she married. Her last performance took place on June 26, 1883.

== Selected roles ==
- Emilie in Soldaterløier (Soldiers' Pranks) by Jens Christian Hostrup (National Theater, Bergen, 1877)
- Jolanthe in Kong Renés datter (King René's Daughter) by Henrik Hertz (National Theater, Bergen)
- Ragna Monsen in De unges forbund (The League of Youth) by Henrik Ibsen (National Theater, Bergen)
- Kari in Inden Døre (Indoors) by Magdalene Thoresen (National Theater, Bergen)
- Olaf in Samfundets støtter (The Pillars of Society) by Henrik Ibsen (National Theater, Bergen)
- Anna in Kjærlighedens Komedie (Love's Comedy) by Henrik Ibsen (National Theater, Bergen)
