= Walter Voss =

Walter Voss may refer to:

- Tillie Voss (Walter Clarence Voss, 1897–1975), American football player
- Walter Voss (KPD) (1907–1983), German politician
- Walter Voss (SPD) (1909–1963), German politician

== See also ==
- Walter Voß (1885–1972), German jurist and politician
