= Hermann Voss =

Hermann Voss may refer to:

- Hermann Voss (art historian) (1884–1969) German art historian and museum director
- Hermann Voss (anatomist) (1894–1987) German anatomist and medical author
- Hermann Voss (musician) (born 1934), German violist, painter and puppet player
