= Olav Voss =

Norwegian actor (1864–1912)

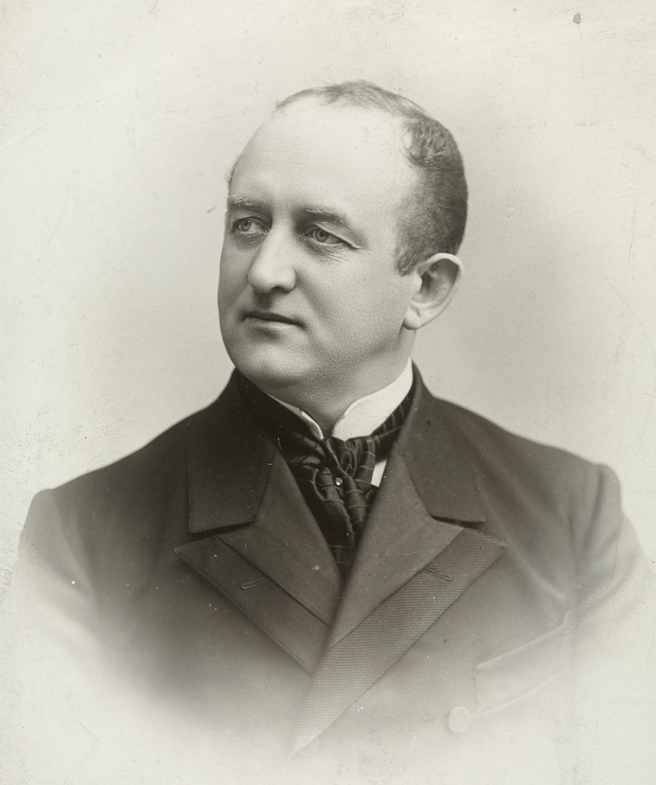
- Born: December 28, 1864; Kristiania (now Oslo), Norway
- Died: May 17, 1912 (aged 47); Oslo, Norway
- Occupation: Actor
- Spouse: Johanne Voss
- Parents: Johan Voss (father); Andrine Frogh Voss (mother)
- Relatives: Torolf Voss

Olav Voss (December 28, 1864 – May 17, 1912) was a Norwegian actor.

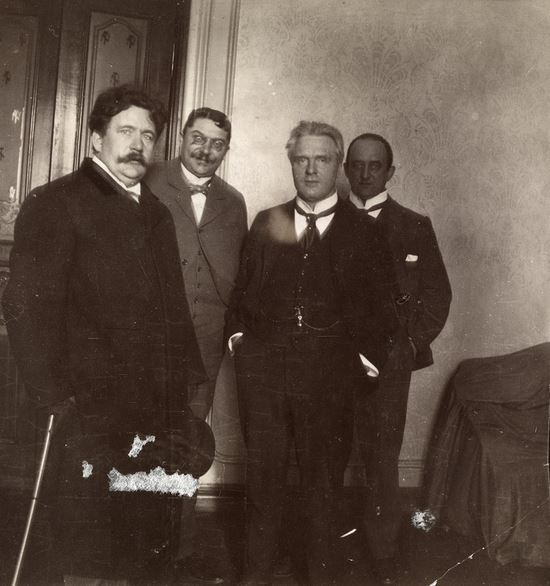
Olav Voss is standing to the right in this 1903 photo from the National Theater. From left are also the composer Johan Halvorsen, the actor Olaf Mørch Hansson, and the theater director Bjørn Bjørnson.

After receiving his examen artium in 1882, he made his debut at the Christiania Theater and was later employed at the National Theater in Bergen, at the Carl Johan Theater in Kristiania, and at the Fahlstrøm Theater. After a brief engagement in 1898 at the Christiania Theater, he moved to the National Theater, which had opened in 1899. He was remembered for his roles as Jensen in Edgar Høyer's Familien Jensen (The Jensen Family), as the chef Pastor Manders in Sigurd Eldegard's Fossegrimen (The Waterfall Sprite), and as Professor Dupont in Melchior Lengyel's Taifun (Typhoon). Voss was the head of the Norwegian Actors' Equity Association from 1899 to 1901 and a board member of the Kristiania Art Society.

Olav Voss was the son of the schoolteacher Johan Voss (1834–1882) and Andrine Frogh Voss (1838–1909). His brother was the conductor and composer Torolf Voss (1877–1943). His brother Johan Ejnar Voss (1868–1948) was a court lawyer and the father of the actor Tore Foss (1901–1968). In 1891 Olav Voss married the actress Johanne Voss (1868–1946), who also performed at the National Theater after it opened in 1899.

Voss is buried at the Western Cemetery in Oslo.
