= John Voss =

John Voss may refer to:

- John Voss (ice hockey) (born 1946), Canadian ice hockey goaltender
- John Voss (sailor) (1858–1922), German-Canadian who sailed the around the world in a modified dug-out canoe he named Tilikum
- John Voss (politician), American state legislator
- John Voss, a fictional character in Richard Russo's novel Empire Falls

== See also ==
- Johann Heinrich Voss (1751–1826), German classicist and poet
