= Andreas Voss =

Andreas Voss may refer to:

- Andreas Voss (botanist) (1857–1924), German botanist
- Andreas Voss (footballer) (born 1979), German former football player
