= Voss Church =

Church in Vestland, Norway

- Voss kyrkje
- Vangskyrkja
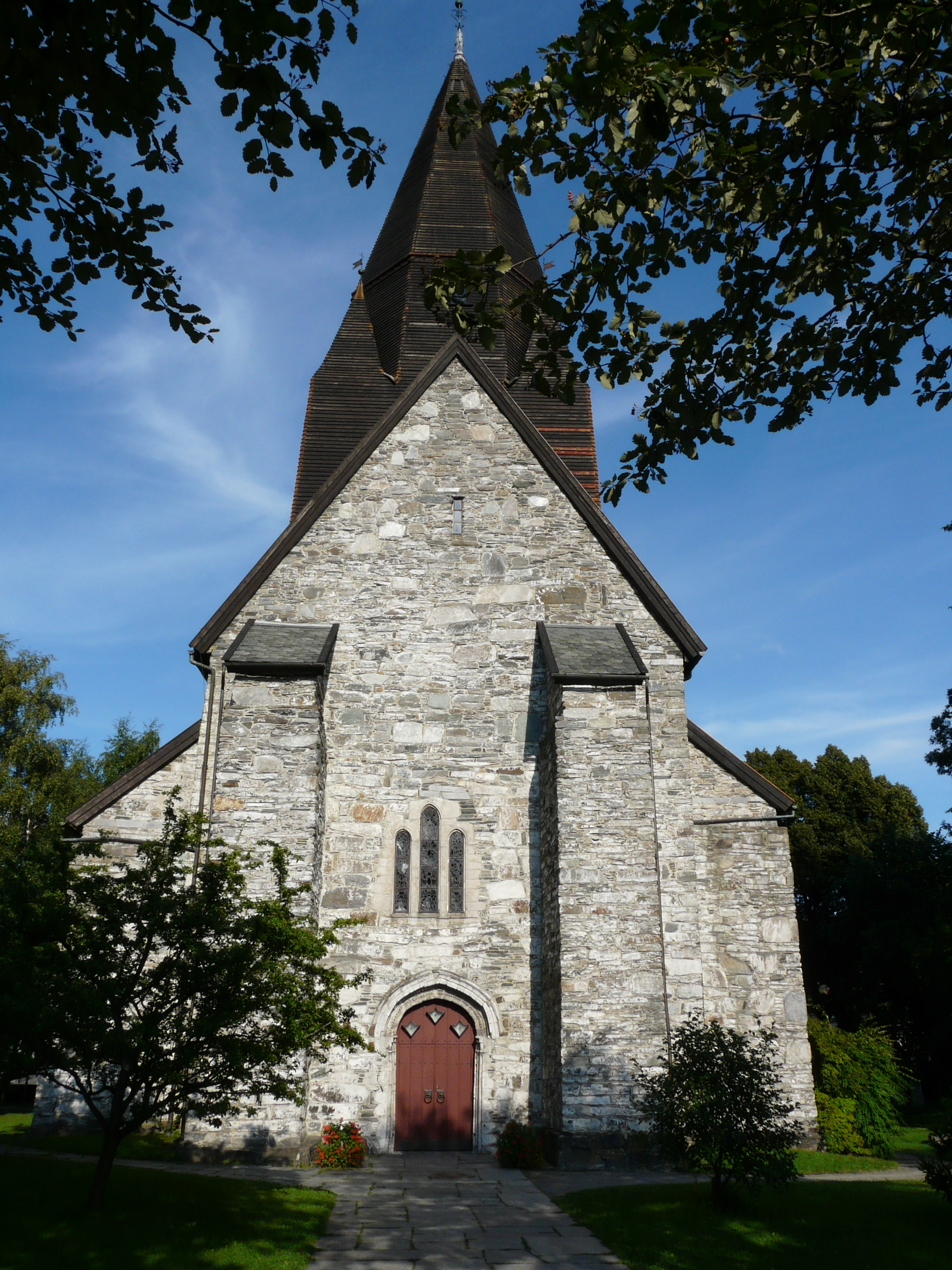
- View of the church
- Voss Church
- 60°37′44″N 6°25′01″E
- Location: Voss, Vestland
- Country: Norway
- Denomination: Church of Norway
- Previous denomination: Catholic Church
- Churchmanship: Evangelical Lutheran

History
- Status: Parish church
- Founded: 11th century
- Consecrated: c. 1277

Architecture
- Functional status: Active
- Architectural type: Long church
- Completed: c. 1277 (749 years ago)

Specifications
- Capacity: 460
- Materials: Stone

Administration
- Diocese: Bjørgvin bispedømme
- Deanery: Hardanger og Voss prosti
- Parish: Voss
- Norwegian Cultural Heritage Site
- Type: Church
- Status: Automatically protected
- ID: 85868

Voss Church (Nynorsk: Voss kyrkje or Bokmål: Voss kirke; also known as Vangskyrkja) is a parish church of the Church of Norway in Voss Municipality in Vestland county, Norway. It is located in the village of Vossevangen. It is the church for the Voss parish which is part of the Hardanger og Voss prosti (deanery) in the Diocese of Bjørgvin. The gray, stone church was built in a long church design in 1277 using plans drawn up by an unknown architect. The church seats about 460 people.

== History ==
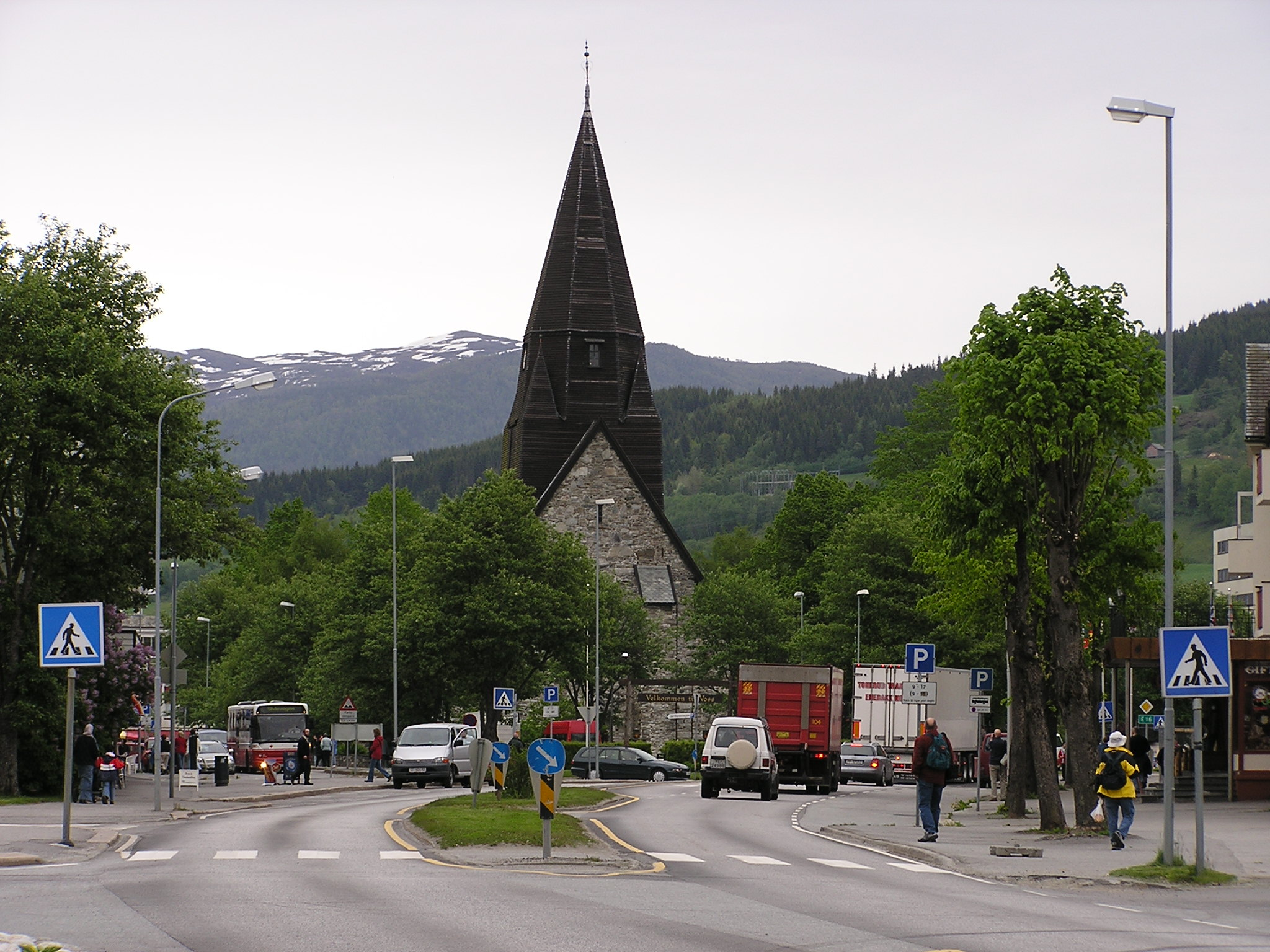
View of the church

The site of the present church may once have been occupied by a heathen temple. In 1023, King Olaf Haraldsen visited Vossevangen to convert the people to Christianity. Tradition says that he built a large stone cross at the site, which was probably the first Christian place of worship at Voss and this place became the main church for all of Hordafylket during the Middle Ages.

The first church in Voss was a wooden building, possibly a stave church, that was likely built during the 11th century. That church was torn down during the 13th century and a new stone church was built to replace it. In a royal letter dating from December 1271, King Magnus Lagabøte expressed his satisfaction that the parishioners were going to replace the old wood church with a new stone one, and he urged the continuation and completion of the task. When it was finished in 1277, the church was dedicated to Saint Michael. The new stone church was built to have a rectangular nave and a narrower, rectangular chancel; a large stone tower above a church porch on the west end of the nave; and a sacristy on the north side of the chancel. During the 17th century, the old stone tower was removed and a wooden tower was erected in its place.

In 1814, this church served as an election church (Norwegian: valgkirke). Together with more than 300 other parish churches across Norway, it was a polling station for elections to the 1814 Norwegian Constituent Assembly which wrote the Constitution of Norway. These were Norway's first national elections. Each church parish was a constituency that elected people called "electors" who later met together in each county to elect the representatives for the assembly that was to meet at Eidsvoll Manor later that year.

During the 1870s, a major renovation was carried out under the leadership of the architect Christian Christie. This included new, larger windows, new paint, and other improvements. These changes gave the church a neo-Gothic style and after they were completed, led to much dissatisfaction among the residents of Voss. At this time, the church was described as having a 18.25-by-10.8-metre (59.9 ft × 35.4 ft) nave, a 8.4-by-8-metre (28 ft × 26 ft) chancel to the east of the nave, and a 7-by-7.12-metre (23.0 ft × 23.4 ft) church porch on the west end of the nave. A new round of restoration work was implemented starting in 1920 under the direction of Georg Greve. The work carried on through the 1920s and 1930s before being interrupted by World War II and bad economic times. These renovations included restoring the more original shape of the windows and bringing the whole church decor back to a pre-Reformation look. The renovations continued after the war in the late-1940s and finally finishing in 1953, this time under the direction of the architect Georg Fischer.

== Media gallery ==
=== Exterior ===
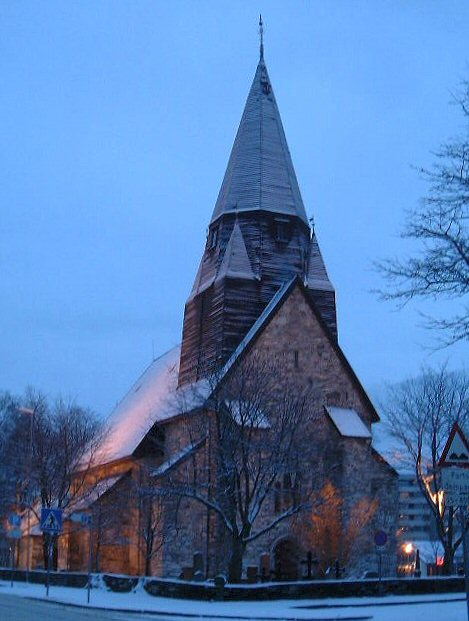

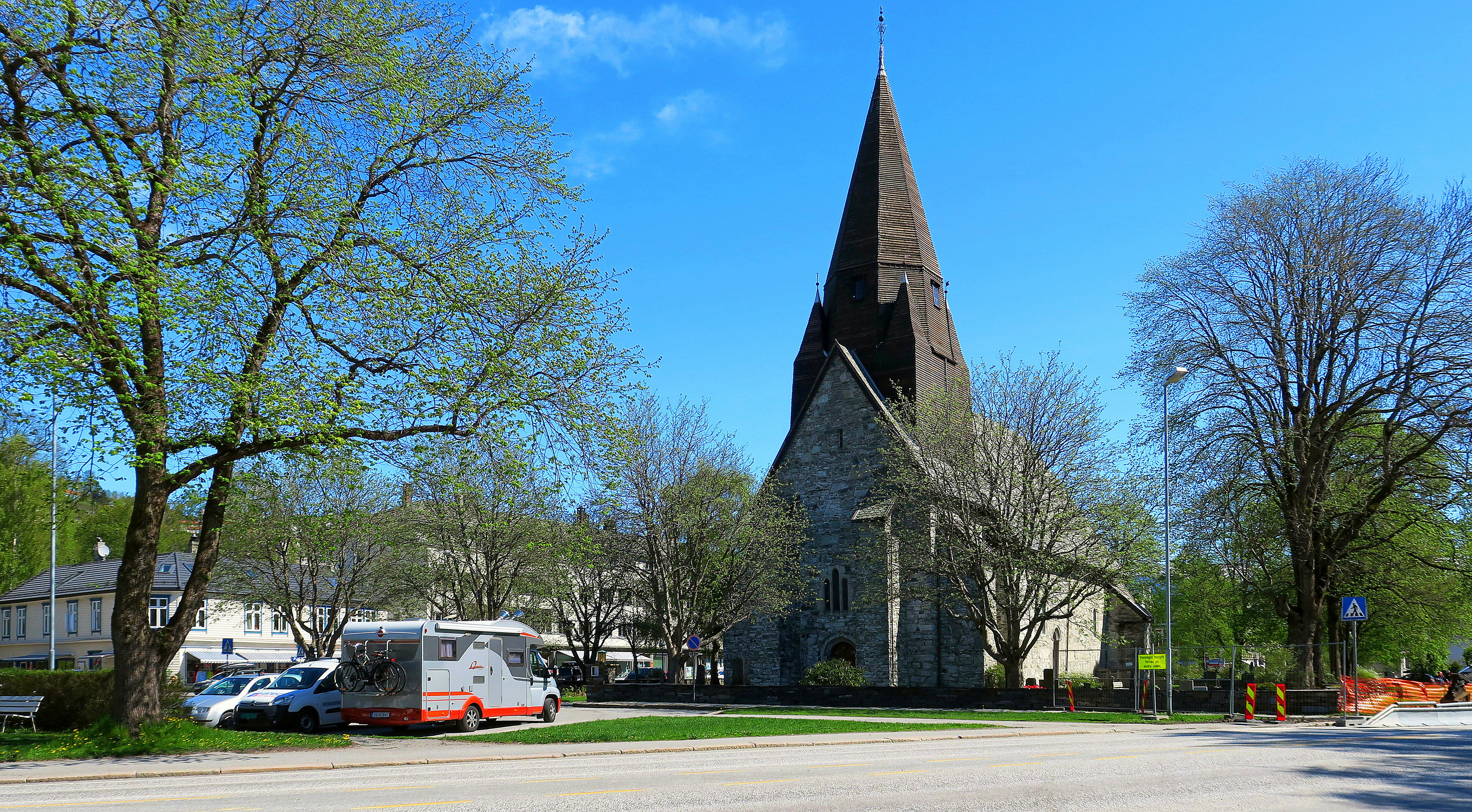

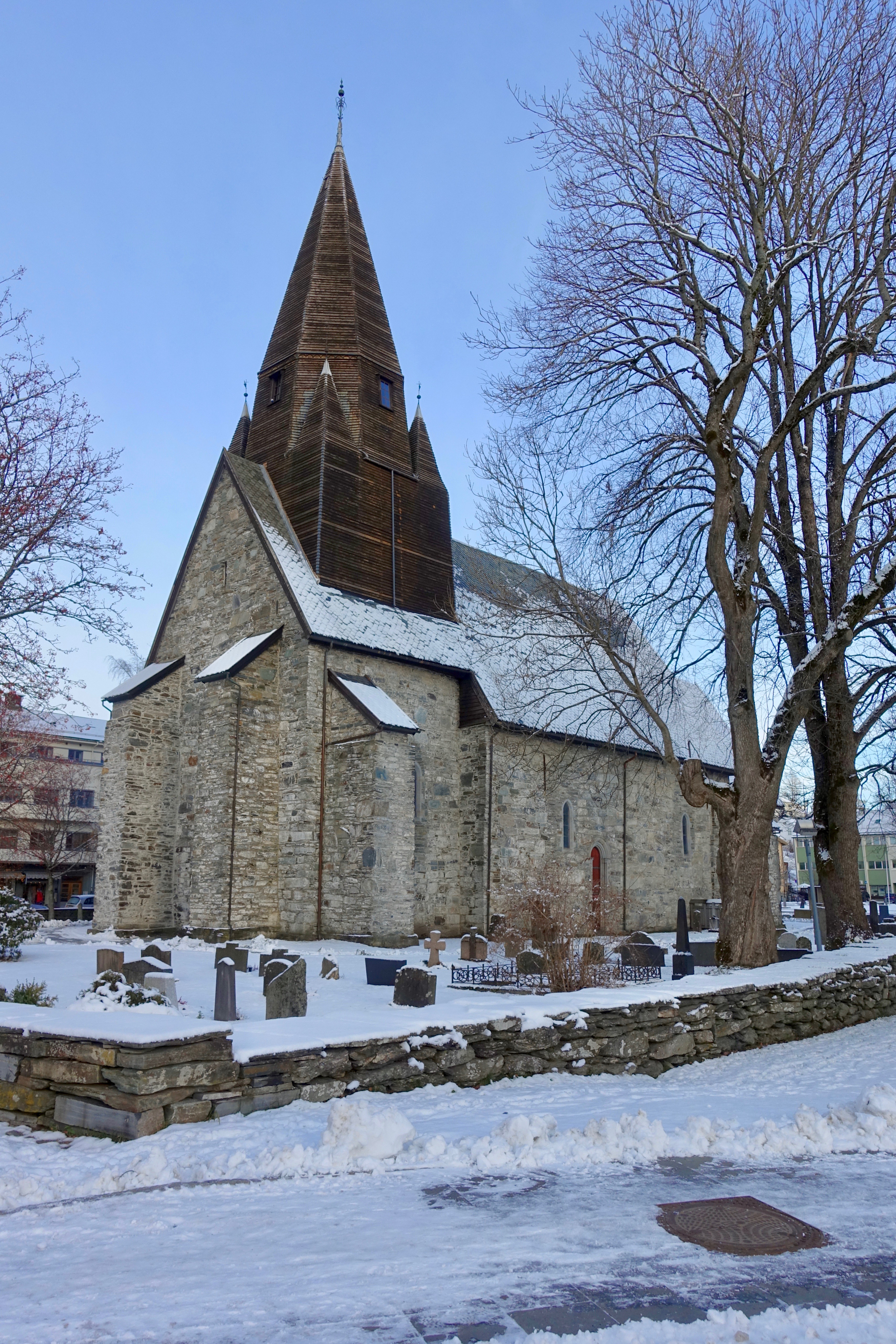

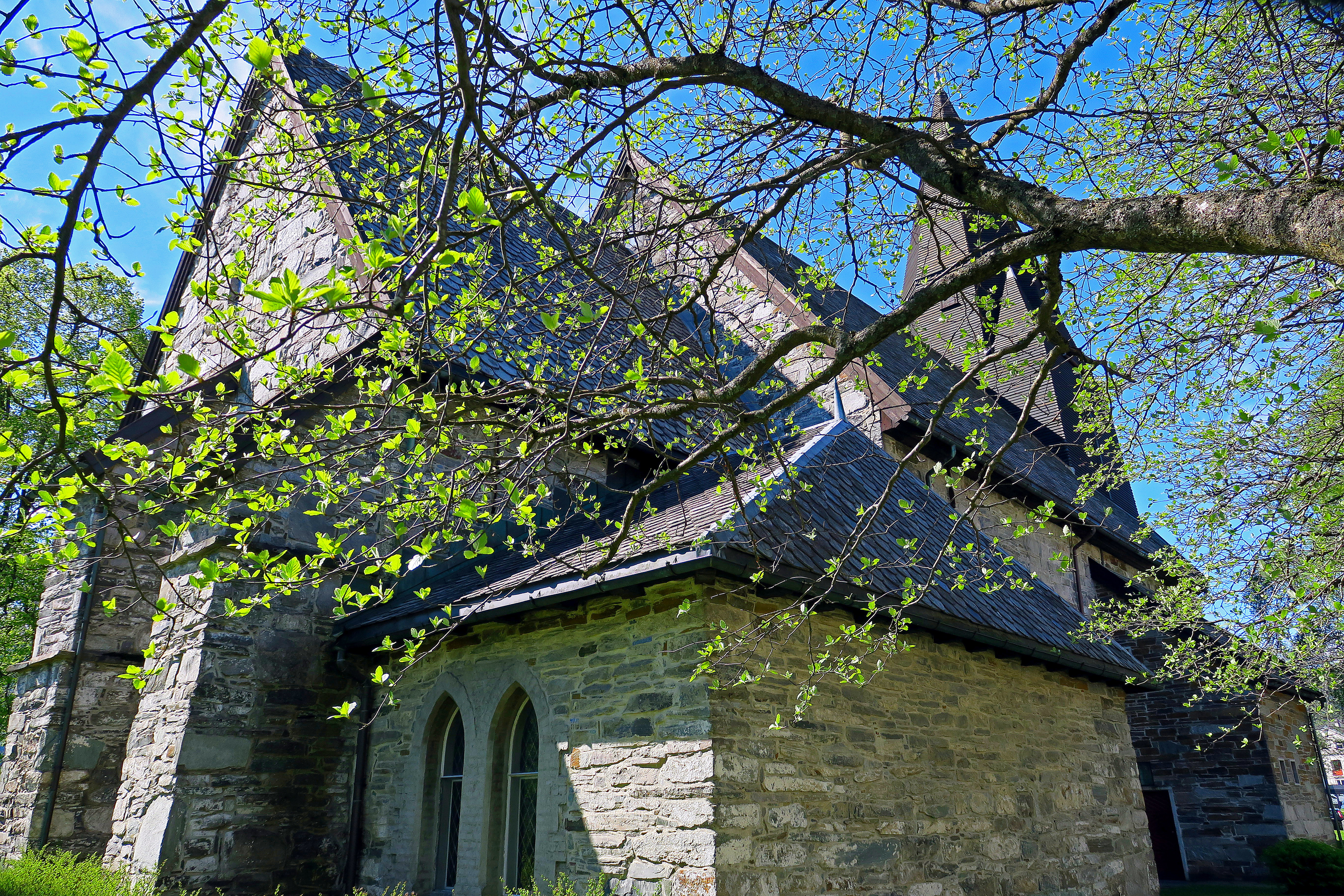

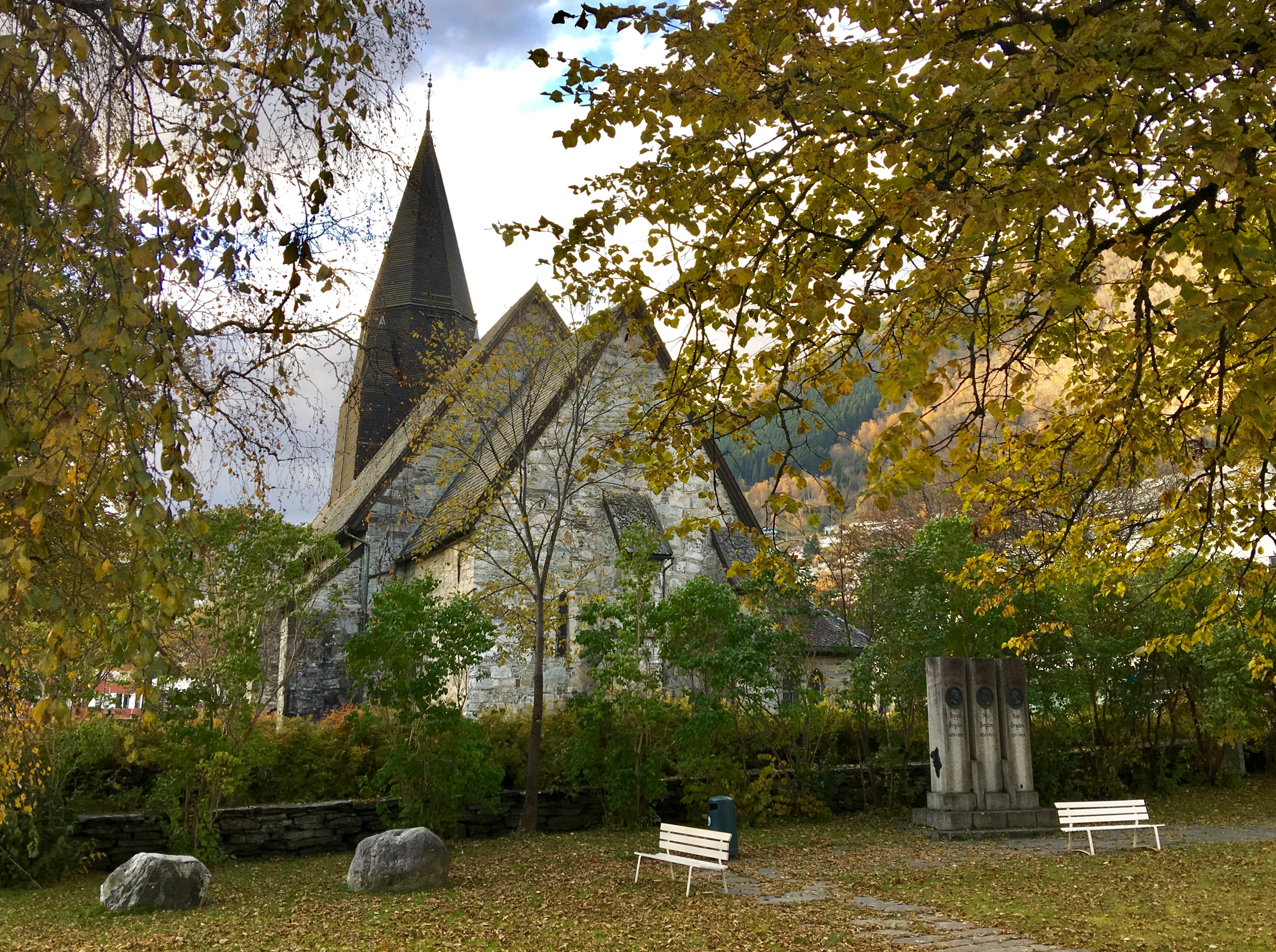

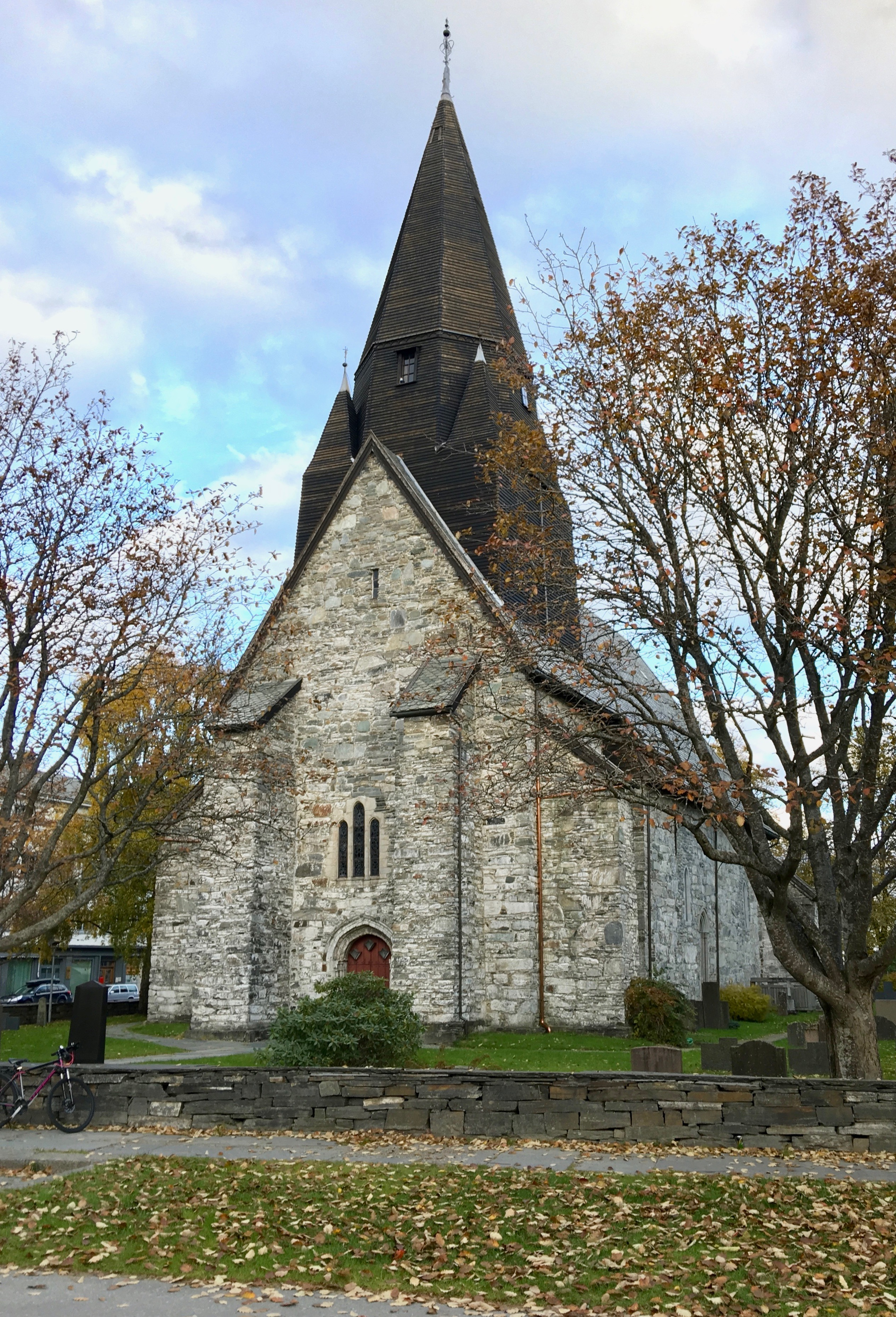

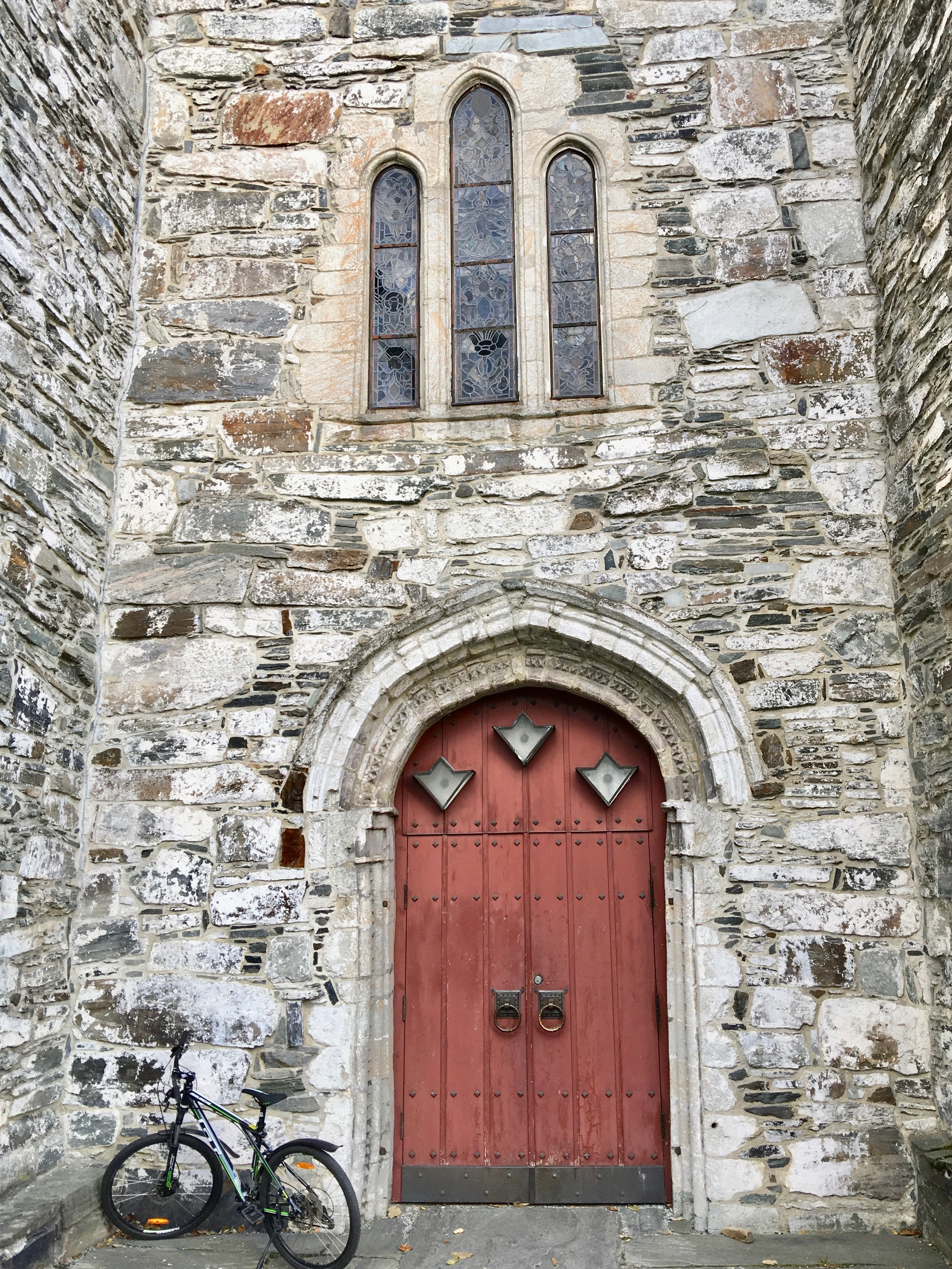

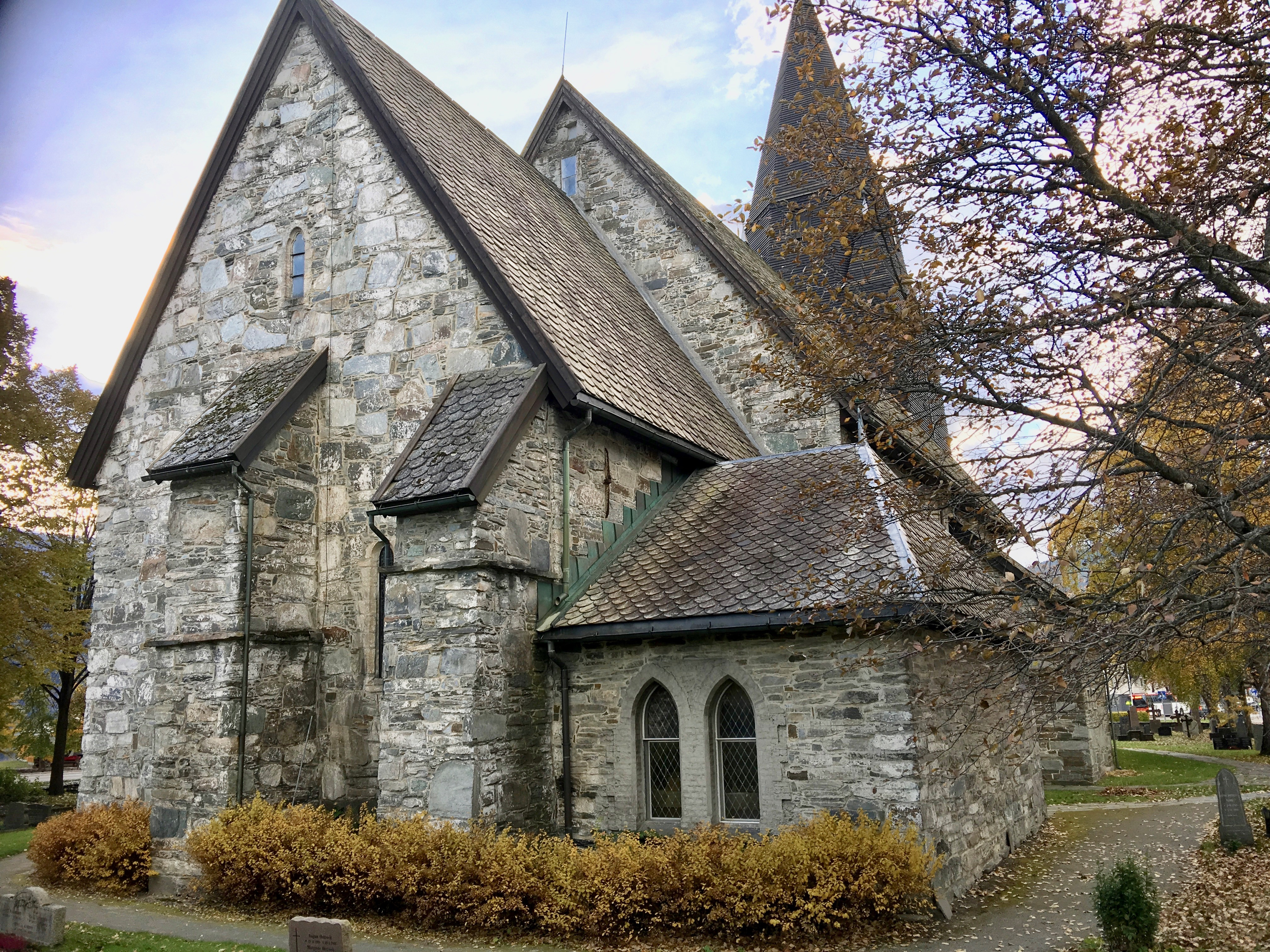

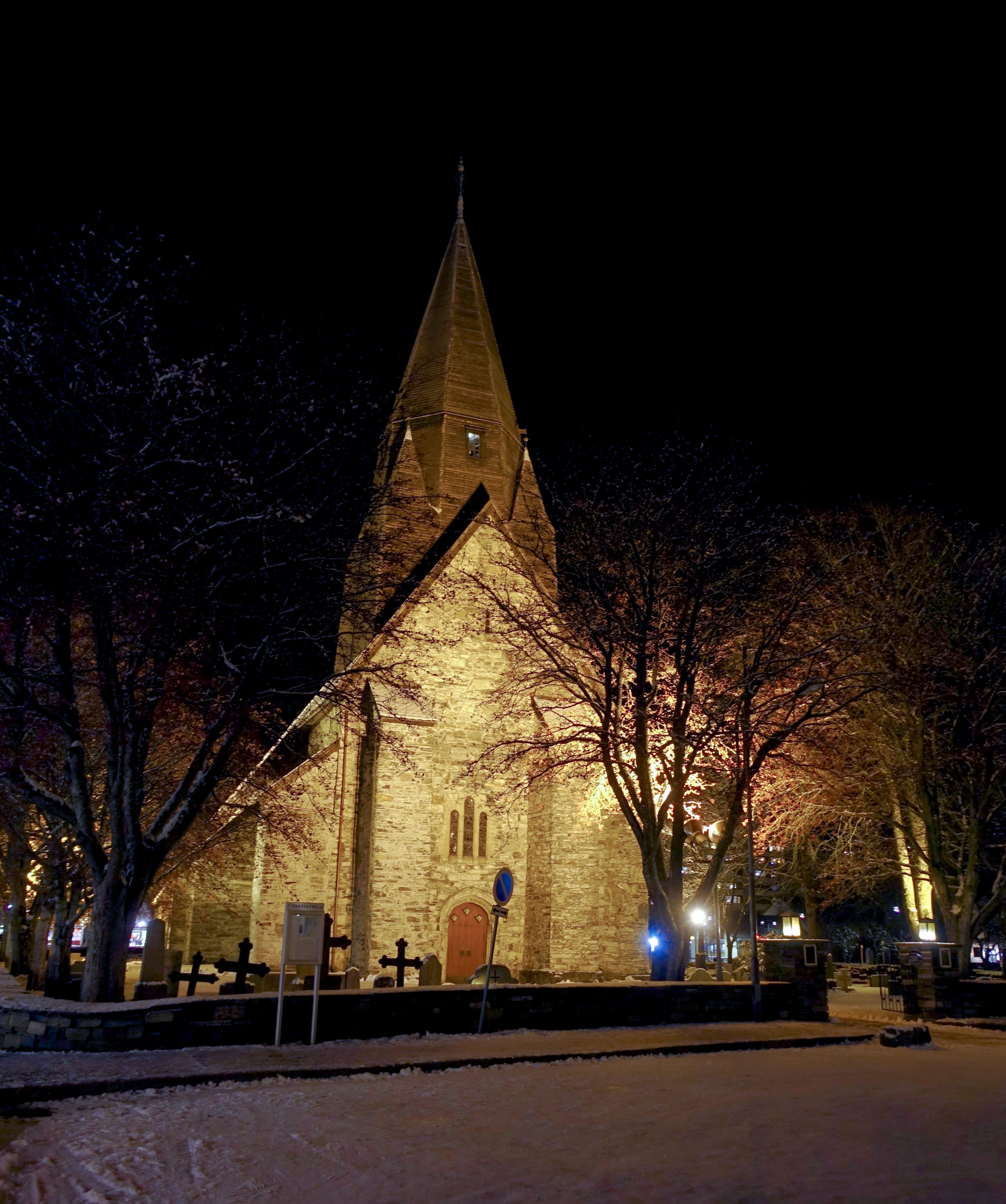

=== Interior ===
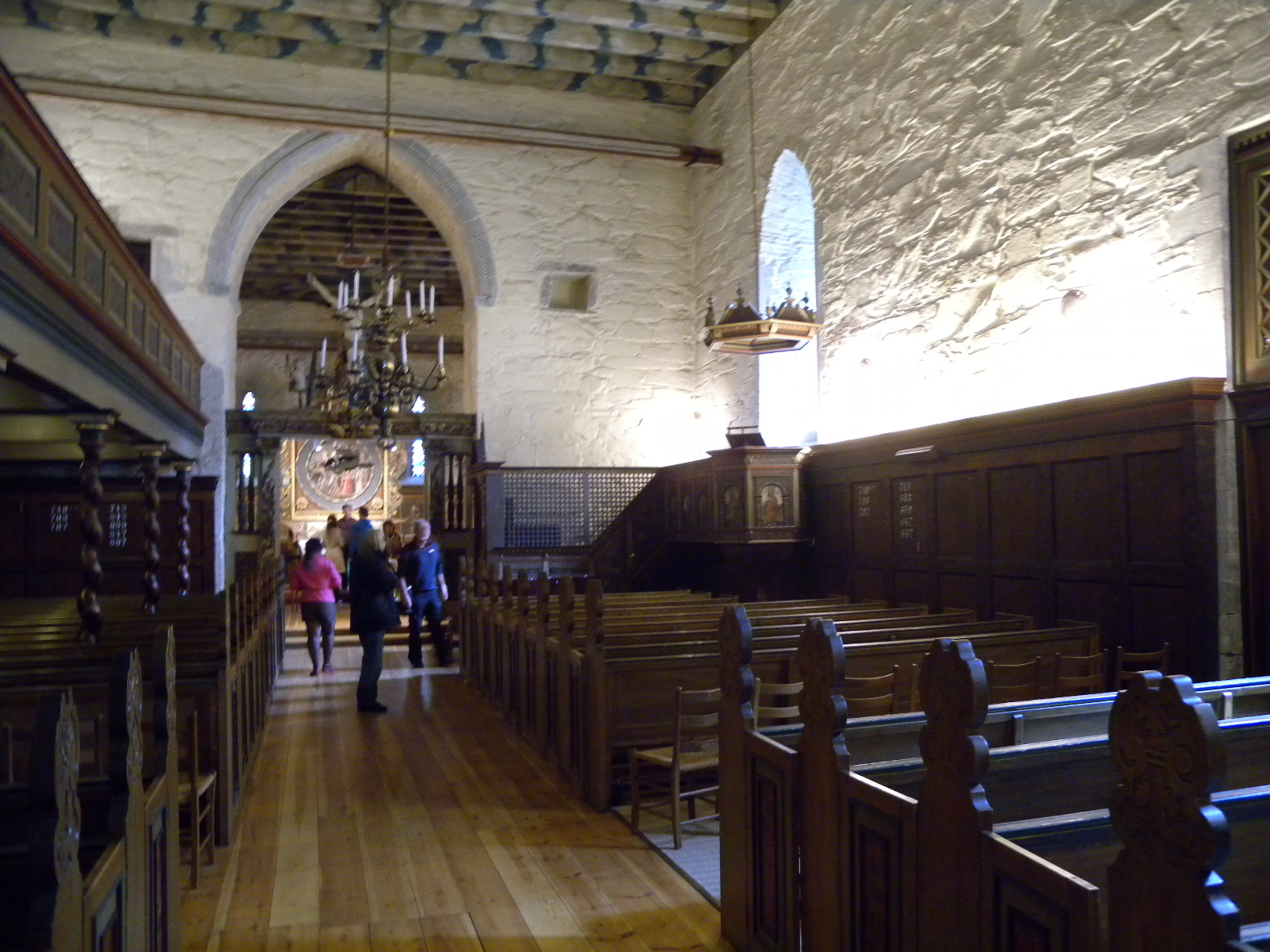
Interior of Voss Church

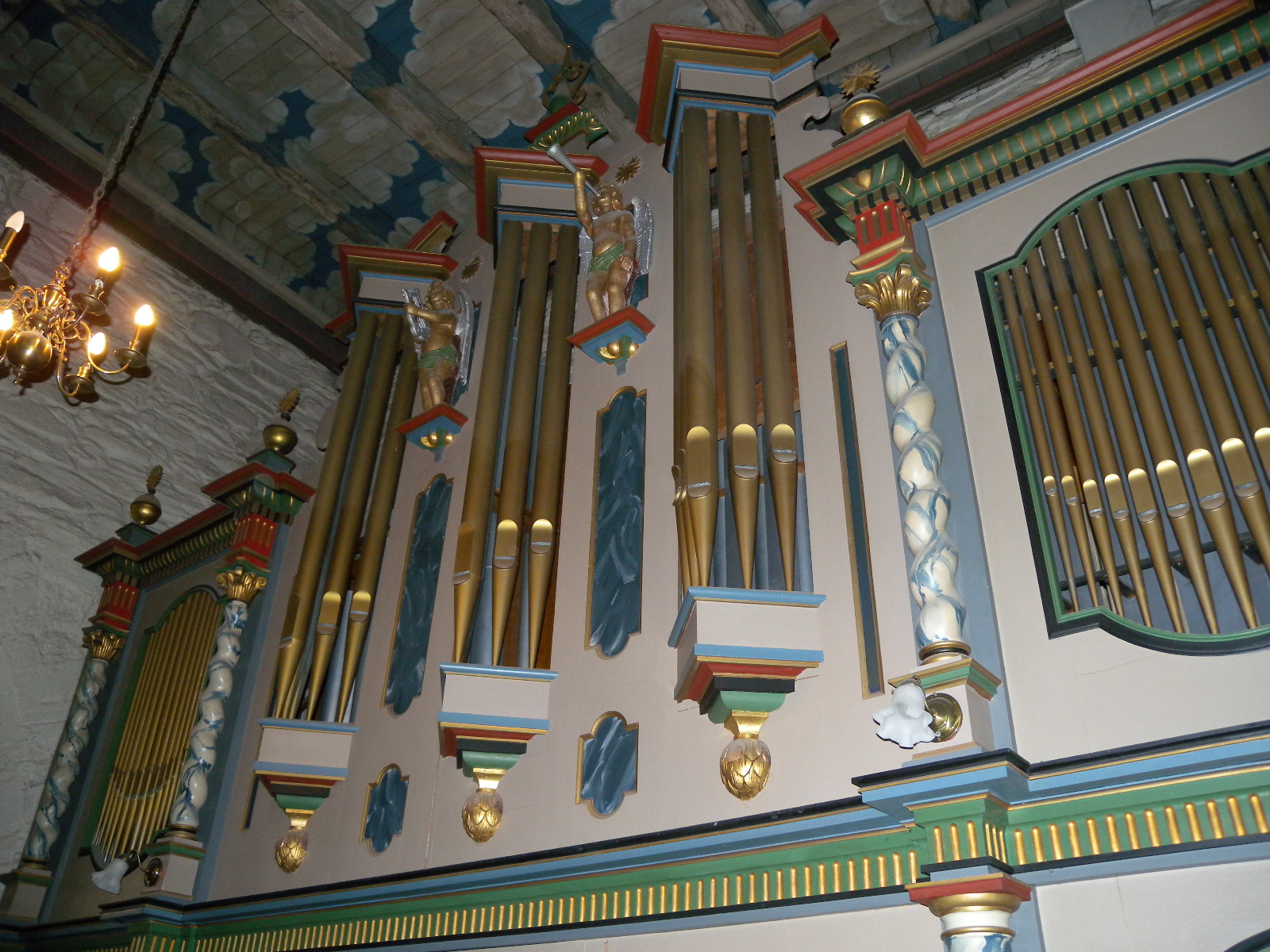
Voss Church organ

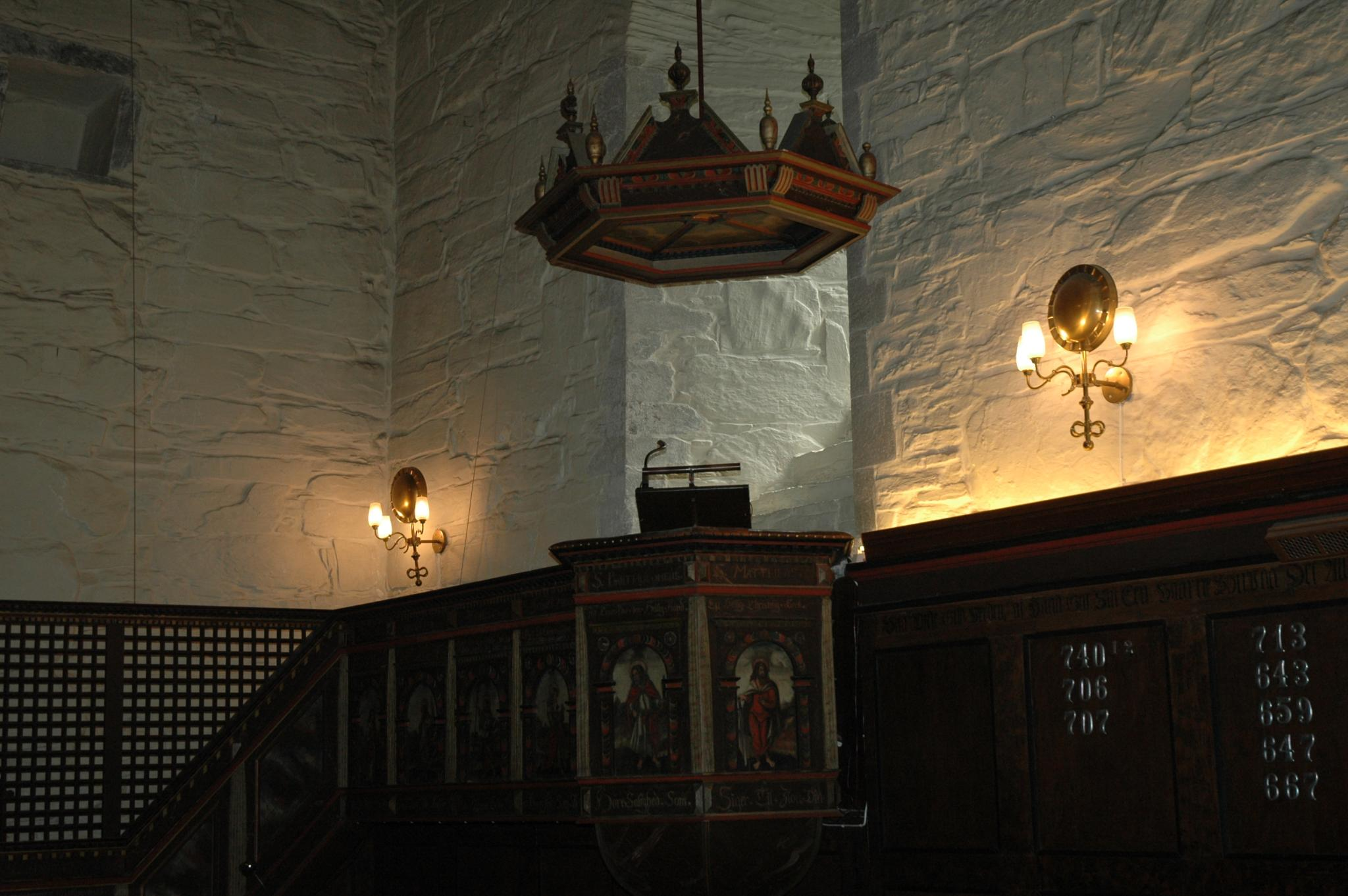
Voss Church pulpit

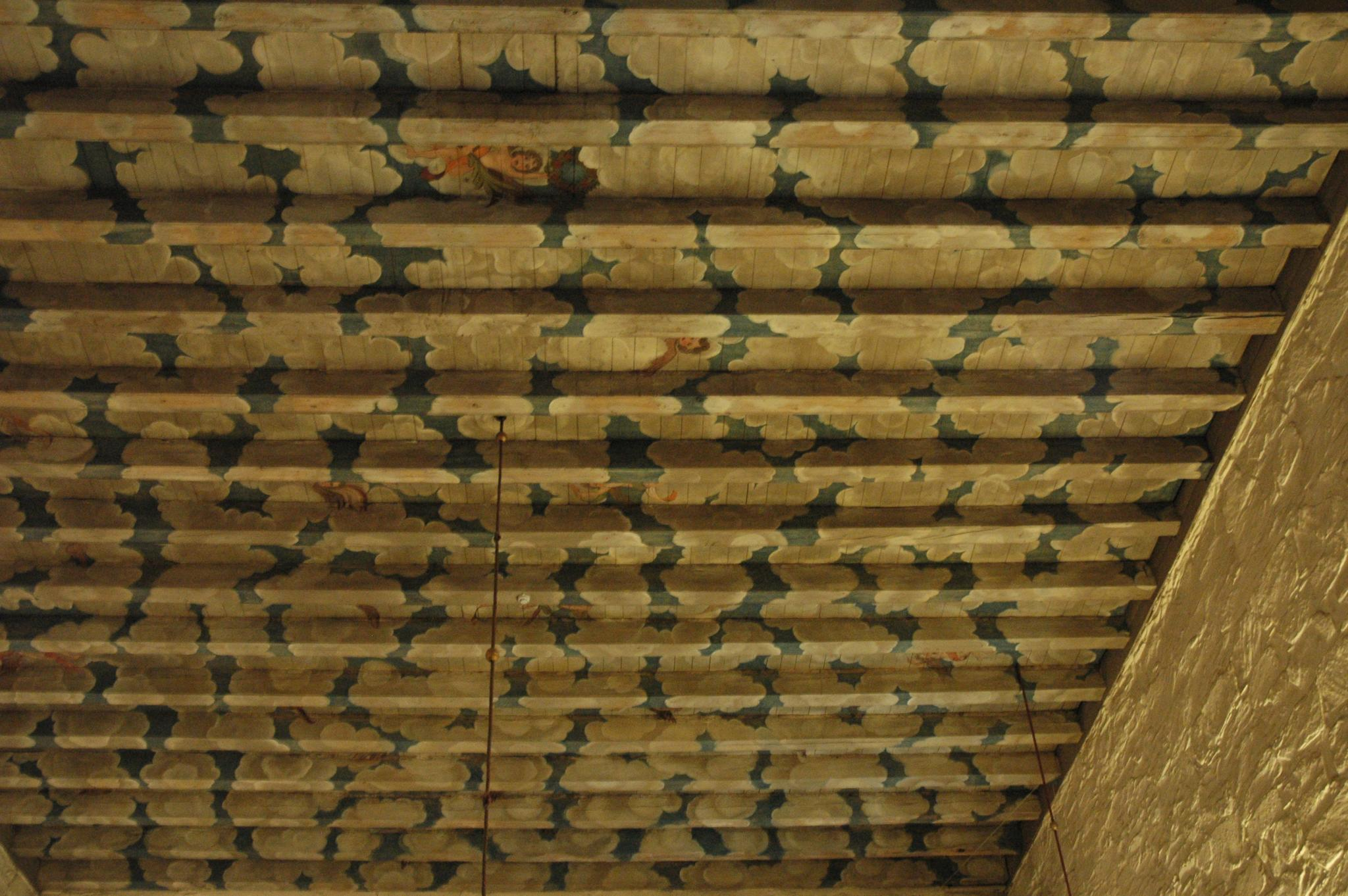
Voss Church ceiling

== See also ==
- List of churches in Bjørgvin
