= Gerardus Vossius =

Dutch classical scholar and theologian (1577–1649)

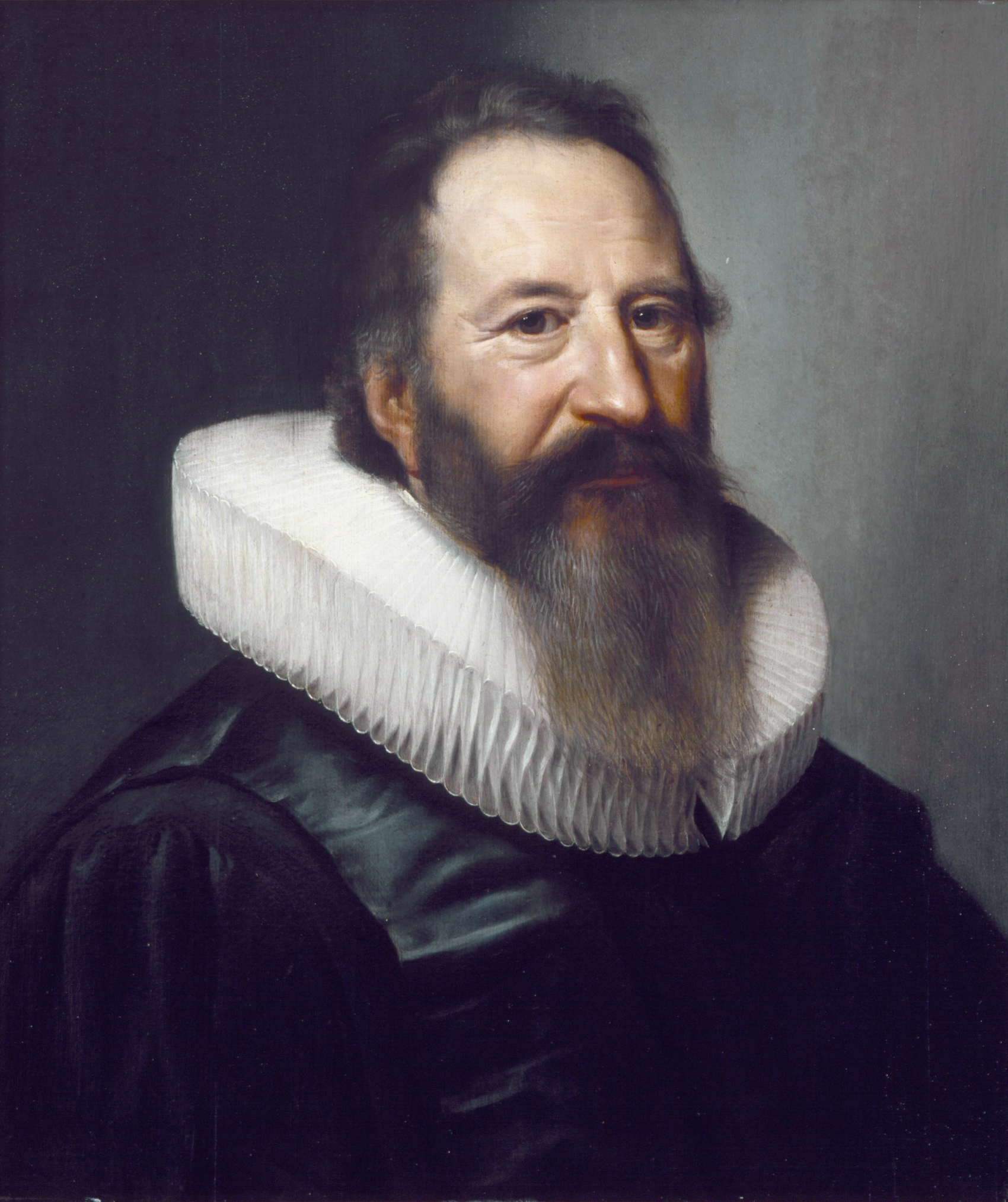
Gerrit Johan Vossius

Gerrit Janszoon Vos (March or April 1577, Heidelberg – 19 March 1649, Amsterdam), often known by his Latin name Gerardus Vossius, was a Dutch classical scholar, theologian, and polymath.

== Life ==
He was the son of Johannes (Jan) Vos, a Protestant from the Netherlands, who fled from persecution into the Electorate of the Palatinate and briefly became pastor in the village near Heidelberg where Gerardus (the Latinized form of Gerrit) was born, before friction with the strict Lutherans of the Palatinate caused him to settle the following year at the University of Leiden as student of theology, and finally became pastor at Dordrecht, where he died in 1585. Here in Dordrecht the son received his education, until in 1595 he entered the University of Leiden, where he became the lifelong friend of Hugo Grotius, and studied classics, Hebrew, church history and theology.

In 1600 he was made rector of the former Latin school in Dordrecht (Now Johan De Witt-Gymnasium), and devoted himself to philology and historical theology. From 1614 to 1619 he was director of the theological college at Leiden University.

In the meantime, he was gaining a great reputation as a scholar, not only in the Netherlands, but also in France and England. But in spite of the moderation of his views and his abstention from controversy, he came under suspicion of heresy, and escaped expulsion from his office only by resignation (1619). The year before he had published his Historia Pelagiana, a history of the Pelagian controversies; at the time it was considered by some to favour the views of the Arminians or Remonstrants.

In 1622, he was appointed professor of rhetoric and chronology, and subsequently of Greek, in the university. He had many contacts in England; he declined invitations from Cambridge, but accepted from Archbishop Laud a prebend in Canterbury Cathedral without residence, and went to England to be installed in 1629, when he was made LL.D. at Oxford. He was on intimate terms with Thomas Farnaby, and Farnaby's "Latin Grammar" is based to a certain extent upon that which Vossius wrote for the Elzevir press in 1629. Among his other English correspondents were Brian Duppa, Dudley Carleton, Lord Herbert of Cherbury, George Villiers, 1st Duke of Buckingham, the prelates James Ussher and Richard Sterne, and Christopher Wren.

He got permission from Charles I to return to the Low Countries. In 1632 he left Leiden to take the post of professor of history in the newly founded Athenaeum Illustre at Amsterdam, which he held until his death.

== Family ==
His son Isaac (1618–1689), after a career of scholarship in Sweden, became residentiary canon at Windsor in 1673. He was the author of De septuaginta interpretibus (1661), De poematum cantu et viribus rhythmi (1673), and Variarum observationum liber (1685).

Others:

- His son Dionysius Vossius died 1633 or 1640. He made notes on the work of Moses Maimonides.
- His third son Gerrit Vossius died 1640. He was an editor of Velleius Paterculus (1639).
- His son Matthew died 1646. He made a chronicle of Holland.
- Francis Vossius was Gerardus Vossius's brother.

A person also called Gerardus Vossius, a Roman Catholic who made annotated Latin translations of Gregory Thaumaturgus and Cicero and died in Liège in 1609, was a distant relation.

== Works ==
Vossius was amongst the first scholars to treat both Christian theological dogma and non-Christian religion from a scientific-historical, instead of a theological point of view. His principal works are:

- Historiae de controversiis quas Pelagius eiusque reliquiae moverunt (1618)
- Aristarchus, sive de arte grammatica (1635 and 1695; new ed. in 2 vols., 1833–35)
- Etymologicum linguae Latinae (Etymology of the Latin Language; 1662; new ed. in two vols., 1762–63)
- Commentariorum Rhetoricorum oratoriarum institutionum Libri VI. (Essays on Rhetoric, or The Institutes of Oratory; 1606 and often)
- De Historicis Graecis Libri IV (The Greek Historians; 1624)
- De Historicis Latinis Libri III (The Latin Historians; 1627)
- Of Errors of Speech and Latino-Barbarous Terms (1640)
- De Theologia Gentili (1641)
- Dissertationes Tres de Tribus Symbolis, Apostolico, Athanasiano et Constantinopolitano (1642)
- The Times of the Ancient Poets (1654)
- Correspondence of Vossius with Eminent Men, (1691).

His collected works were published in Amsterdam (6 vols., 1695–1701).

In rhetoric, his works enjoyed a wide circulation and were used as textbooks. He supported Aristotle's definitions, and opposed Ramism. While his major influences were Aristotle and Cicero, he also cited Hermogenes, Menander Rhetor, Bartholomeus Keckermann and Nicolas Caussin.
