= Johanne Voss =

Norwegian actress (1868–1946)

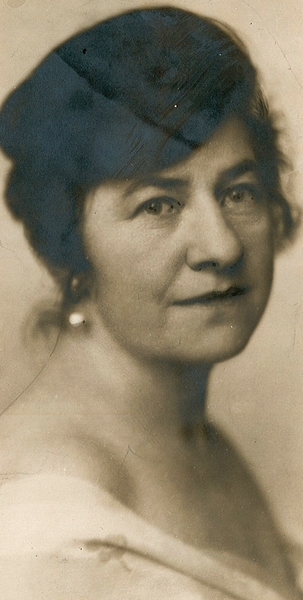
- Born: January 13, 1868; Bergen, Norway
- Died: July 27, 1946 (aged 78); Oslo, Norway
- Resting place: Western Cemetery
- Occupation: Actress
- Spouse: Olav Voss
- Parents: Peter Olay Paulsen (father); Johanne Severine Jørgensen (mother)
- Relatives: Anna Paulsen

Johanne Voss (née Paulsen, January 13, 1868 – July 27, 1946) was a Norwegian actress from Bergen.

== Family ==
Johanne Voss was the daughter of the carpenter Peter Olay Paulsen and Johanne Severine Jørgensen, and the sister of the actress Anna Paulsen (1858–1895). On October 24, 1891, she married the actor Olav Voss (1864–1912) in Bergen.

== Life and work ==
After graduating from high school in 1883, Voss debuted on April 12, 1887, at her hometown theater, the National Theater in Bergen, as Pauline Protat in the play L'Héritage de Monsieur Plumet (Mr. Plummet's Bequest) by Théodore Barrière and Fritz Holst. She was engaged with this theater until about 1893.

Later she accompanied her husband Olav Voss to the theater stages in Kristiania (now Oslo). She was initially engaged at the Carl Johan Theater until it went bankrupt in 1895. She then toured with the Swedish theater director August Lindberg's company in Sweden and Norway for two years, after which she performed at the Central Theater (from 1897 to 1898) and the Christiania Theater (from 1898 to 1899). In 1898 she performed in Trondheim with Johan Fahlstrøm's troupe from the Central Theater. In 1899, Voss was the recipient of a state artist's scholarship worth NOK 750 to pursue further education abroad.

Voss was probably best known for her roles at the National Theater in Oslo from its inception in 1899, where she worked until 1937, often in comic roles. On her twenty-fifth anniversary as an actress in 1912, the National Theater staged Oscar Wilde's play Lady Windermere's Fan as a benefit performance for her, in which she played the role of Erlynne.

Voss also appeared as an actress in several Norwegian films. As late as 1942, she played the role of Mrs. Solberg in Jeg drepte!

Johanne Voss is buried at Western Cemetery in Oslo.

== Selected theater roles ==
- Pauline Protat in L'Héritage de Monsieur Plumet (Mr. Plummet's Bequest) by Théodore Barrière and Fritz Holst (National Theater, Bergen, 1887)
- Sigrid in Til Sæters: dramatisk Idyl med Sange (To the Mountain Pastures: A Dramatic Idyll with Songs) by Claus Pavels Riis (National Theater, Bergen, 1887)
- Valborg in Magdalene by Gustav Esmann (National Theater, Bergen, 1893)
- Asta in Lille Eyolf (Little Eyolf) by Henrik Ibsen (National Theater, Bergen, 1893)
- Agnete in Agnete by Amalie Skram (Carl Johan Theater, 1894)
- Julie in Faddergaven (The Christening Gift) by Peter Egge (Central Theater, 1897)
- Queen Thora in Axel og Valborg (Axel and Valborg) by Adam Oehlenschläger (Trondheim, 1898)
- Petra in En Folkefiende (An Enemy of the People) by Henrik Ibsen (National Theater, Oslo, 1899)
- Fatimat in Dronning Tamara (Queen Tamara) by Knut Hamsun (National Theater, Oslo, 1904)
- Mrs. Sørby in Vildanden (The Wild Duck) by Henrik Ibsen (National Theater, Oslo, 1904)
- Pernille in Mester Gert Westphaler eller Dend meget talende Barbeer (Gert Westphaler or The Loquacious Barber) by Ludvig Holberg (National Theater, Oslo, 1906)
- Mrs. Ulfstjerna in Johan Ulfstjerna by Tor Hedberg (National Theater, Oslo, 1906)
- Gina Ekdal in Vildanden (The Wild Duck) by Henrik Ibsen (National Theater, Oslo, 1909)
- Erlynne in Lady Windermere's Fan by Oscar Wilde (National Theater, Oslo, 1912)
- Madame Abrahams in Den Politiske Kandestøber (The Political Tinker) by Ludvig Holberg (National Theater, Oslo, 1924)
- Mrs. Stockmann in En Folkefiende (An Enemy of the People) by Henrik Ibsen (National Theater, Oslo, 1924)

== Filmography ==
- 1925: Himmeluret as Gurine on the stairs, a gossip
- 1926: Baldevins bryllup as Ollevine
- 1942: Jeg drepte! as Mrs. Solberg
