= Harald Alfsen =

Norwegian engineer and writer

- Born: October 6, 1873; Kristiania (now Oslo), Norway
- Died: August 24, 1949 (aged 75); Oslo, Norway
- Occupation(s): Science fiction writer, engineer
- Spouse: Alma Wiktoria Alfsen
- Parents: Even Alfsen (father); Anne Johane Marie Alfsen (mother)

Harald Didrik Alfsen (October 6, 1873 – August 24, 1949) was a Norwegian engineer and writer.

Alfsen graduated from the Kristiania Technical School in 1894. In the following years he was employed at the Kristiania Reinforced Concrete and Concrete Products Factory (Norwegian: Kristiania Monier- og Cementvarefabrik), and he was then a city engineer in Porsgrunn. He participated in the development of the Grenland municipal power company. He was in charge of programming for the radio station in Porsgrunn in 1927. For the University of Oslo, he served as the technical head for the excavation of Rakni's Mound. Alfsen was a teacher at the Oslo Technical School for a time, and he published several textbooks. He also wrote novels, plays, and children's books. In 1899 he made his debut with the science fiction novel Jernmennesket (The Iron Man), published under the pseudonym Finn Fare.

== Bibliography ==
- Jernmennesket (The Iron Man), 1899
- Betonskibsbygning (Concrete Ship Construction), 1917
- Veslefrikk med fela (Little Freddy and His Fiddle), 1923
- Småfortellinger (Short Stories) 1926
- Porsgrunns kommunale elektrisitetsverk 1901–1931 (The Porsgrunn Municipal Power Station, 1901–1931), 1931
- Oppgaver i praktisk regning (Exercises in Applied Mathematics) 1945
- Teknisk skrift (Technical Writing), 1945, reprints: 1963, 1972, 1977, 1979
