= Borstrondi =

Village in Voss Municipality, Norway

Borstrondi Skulestadmoen
- Village
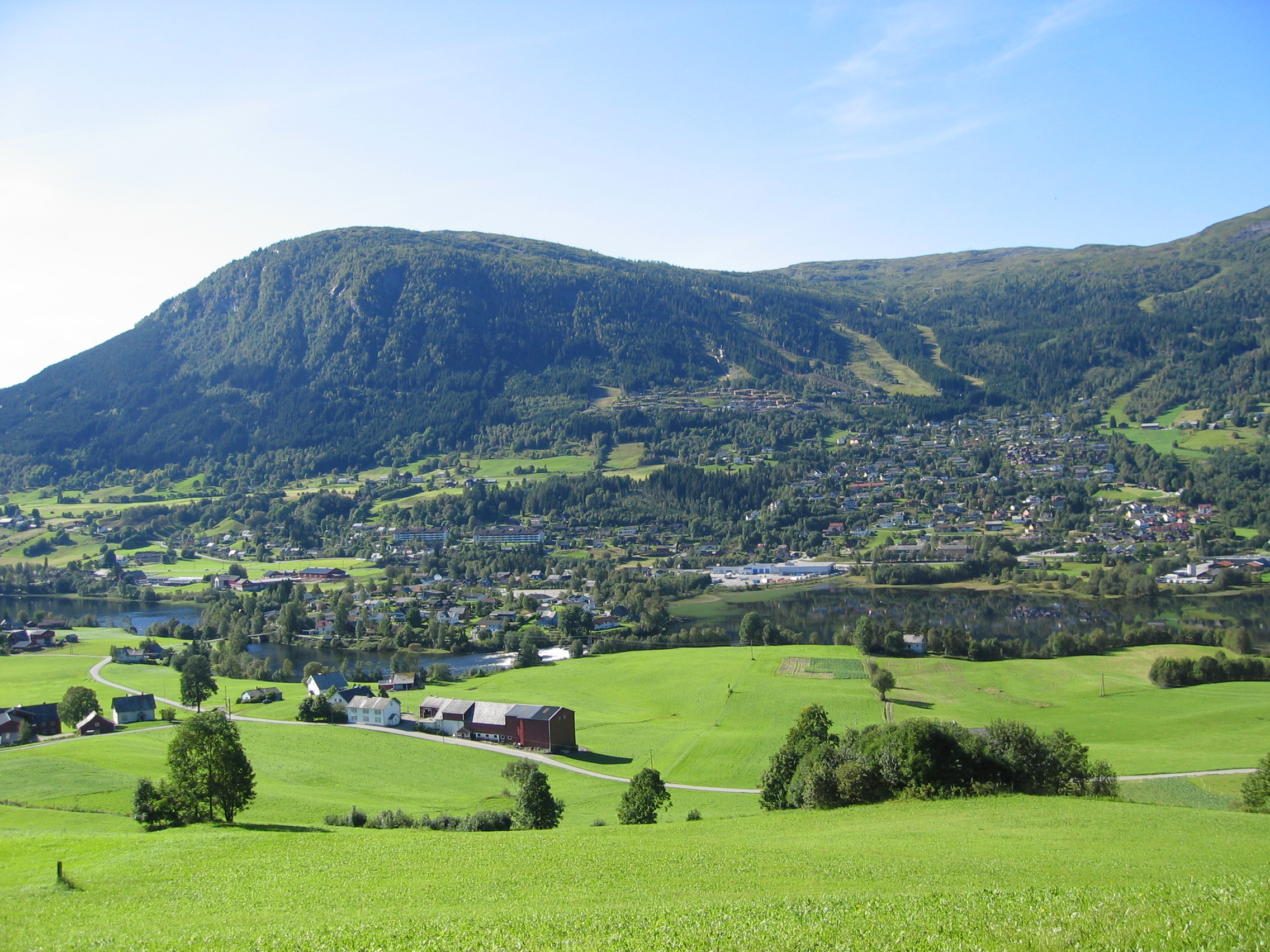
- View of the village area
- Interactive map of Borstrondi
- Coordinates: 60.6566°N 6.4324°E
- Country: Norway
- Region: Western Norway
- County: Vestland
- District: Voss
- Municipality: Voss Municipality

Area
  - Total: 1.15 km^{2} (0.44 sq mi)
- Elevation: 107 m (351 ft)

Population (2025)
  - Total: 1,465
  - Density: 1,274/km^{2} (3,300/sq mi)
- Time zone: UTC+01:00 (CET)
  - Summer (DST): UTC+02:00 (CEST)
- Post Code: 5710 Skulestadmo

Borstrondi or Skulestadmoen is a village in Voss Municipality in Vestland county, Norway. It is located about 2 kilometres (1.2 mi) north of the municipal centre, Vossavangen. The lake Melsvatnet lies just east of the village and the village of Kvitheim lies on the opposite side of the lake.

The 1.15-square-kilometre (280-acre) village has a population (2025) of 1,465 and a population density of 1,274 inhabitants per square kilometre (3,300/sq mi).
