= Torolf Voss =

Norwegian composer and conductor (1877–1943)

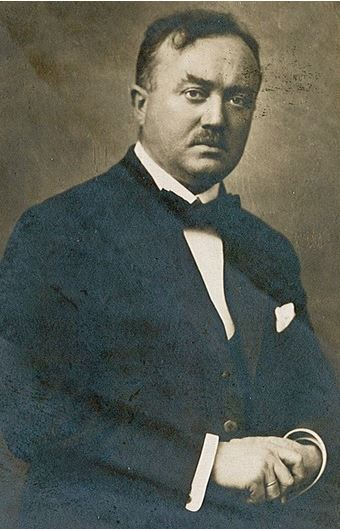
- Born: November 12, 1877; Kristiania (now Oslo), Norway
- Died: November 23, 1943 (aged 66); Oslo, Norway
- Occupations: Conductor, composer
- Spouse: Signe Indahl-Voss
- Parents: Johan Voss (father); Andrine Frogh Voss (mother)
- Relatives: Olav Voss, Tore Foss

Torolf Voss (November 12, 1877 – November 23, 1943) was a Norwegian conductor and composer.

== Family ==
Torolf Voss was the son of the schoolteacher Johan Voss (1834–1882) and Andrine Frogh Voss (1838–1909). His elder brother Olav Voss (1864–1912) was an actor. His brother Johan Ejnar Voss (1868–1948) was a court lawyer and the father of the actor Tore Foss (1901–1968). Torolf Voss married the actress Signe Indahl (1890–1965) in 1921.

== Life and work ==
Voss studied at the Oslo Conservatory of Music and under the choral conductor and composer Iver Holter. He also studied at the conservatory in Berlin from 1897 to 1903. From 1900 to 1904 he was conductor of the Oslo Commercial Association Orchestra, which was established in 1841. After a year with an amusement park orchestra, from 1908 to 1929 he was the conductor at the Central Theater under theater director Harald Otto. In the fall of 1928, Voss resigned to become the conductor at the new Kinodromen cinema started by the company Oslo Kinematografer. Voss was a music critic for the newspaper Aftenposten from 1930 to 1935, as an alternate for David Monrad Johansen. The same year he became a knight of the Order of the Dannebrog. From 1935 until his death in 1943, he headed the sheet-music publisher Norsk Musikforlag.

Voss occasionally conducted for the Philharmonic Society Orchestra in Bergen and for the Stockholm Concert Society Orchestra. Voss also led the Norwegian Musical Artists' Society, established in 1912, and from 1917 via a group that broke off to become the Norwegian Composers' Association. Voss composed many pieces, including an arrangement of the workers' song "Vi bygger landet" (We Are Building the Country) in 1935.
