= Dionysius Vossius =

Dutch humanist (1612–1633)

Dionies Vos (1612 – 25 October 1633), often known by his Latin name Dionysius Vossius, was a Dutch translator.

He was the son of Gerardus Vossius and the brother of Isaac Vossius. Born in Dordrecht, he studied Ancient Greek, Latin, Hebrew, Syriac and Arabic. Vossius published his first Arabic dictionary at the age of 16.

Later he published a Latin translation of a tractate on idolatry from the Mishneh Torah by Maimonides, which he had annotated. It was added to the List of Prohibited Books of the Catholic Church.
