= Vossevangen =

Village in Voss Municipality, Norway

Vossavangen Vossevangen
- Village
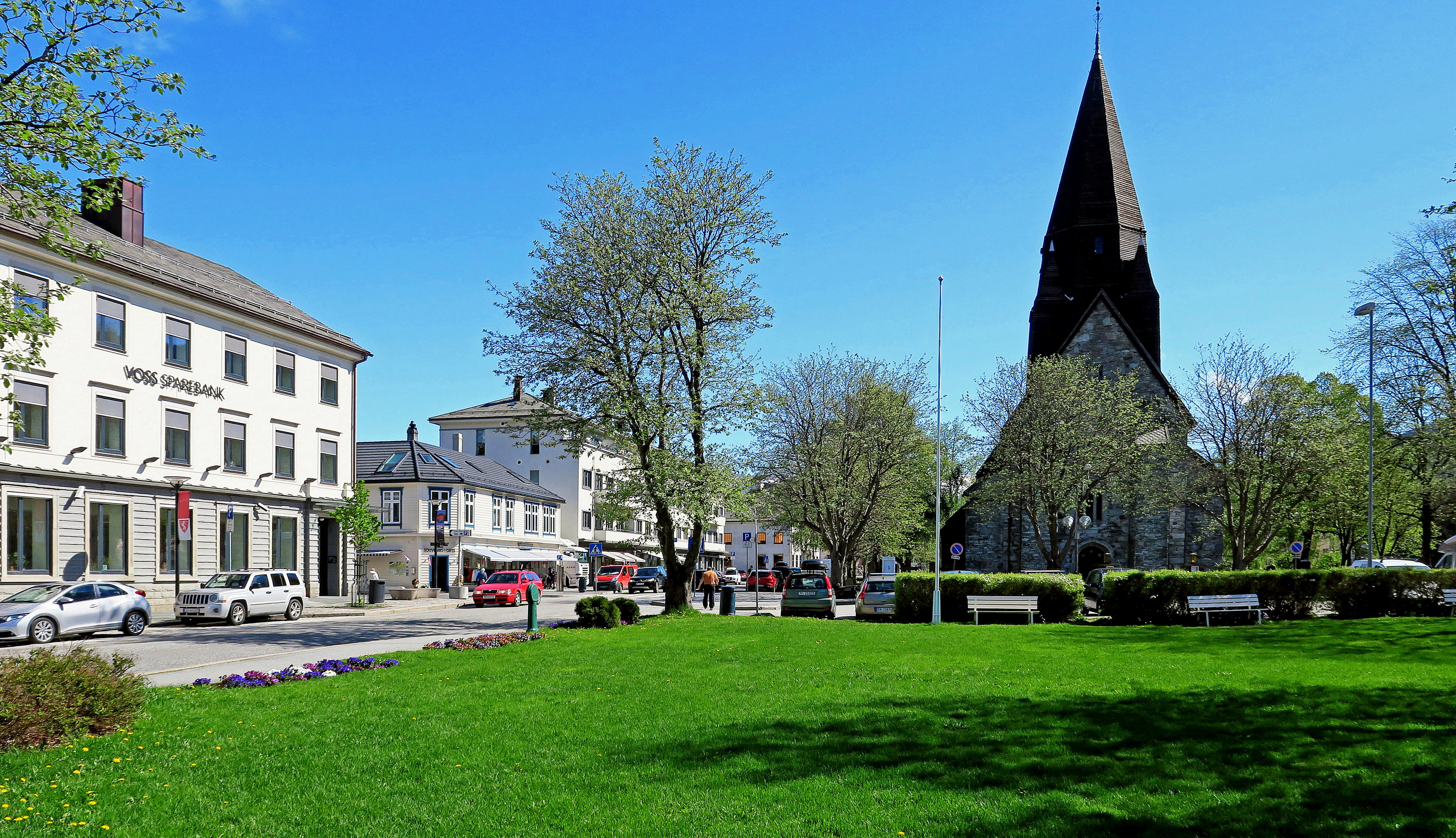
- View of Vossavangen
- Interactive map of the village
- Coordinates: 60.62869°N 6.41474°E
- Country: Norway
- Region: Western Norway
- County: Vestland
- District: Voss
- Municipality: Voss Municipality

Area
  - Total: 3.98 km^{2} (1.54 sq mi)
- Elevation: 50 m (160 ft)

Population (2025)
  - Total: 7,165
  - Density: 1,800/km^{2} (4,700/sq mi)
- Time zone: UTC+01:00 (CET)
  - Summer (DST): UTC+02:00 (CEST)
- Post Code: 5700 Voss

Vossavangen or Vossevangen is the administrative centre of Voss Municipality in Vestland county, Norway. The village lies on the northeastern shore of the lake Vangsvatnet in the central part of the municipality, about 100 kilometres (62 mi) east of the city of Bergen. The villages of Borstrondi and Kvitheim are both small suburbs located just north of Vossevangen.

The 3.98-square-kilometre (980-acre) village has a population (2025) of 7,165 and a population density of 1,800 inhabitants per square kilometre (4,700/sq mi).

The European route E16 highway and the Bergensbanen railway line both run through the village. The railway line stops at Voss Station in the centre of the village. This is the main road and main railway line between the cities of Oslo and Bergen. The Norwegian National Road 13 also runs through the village.

== History ==
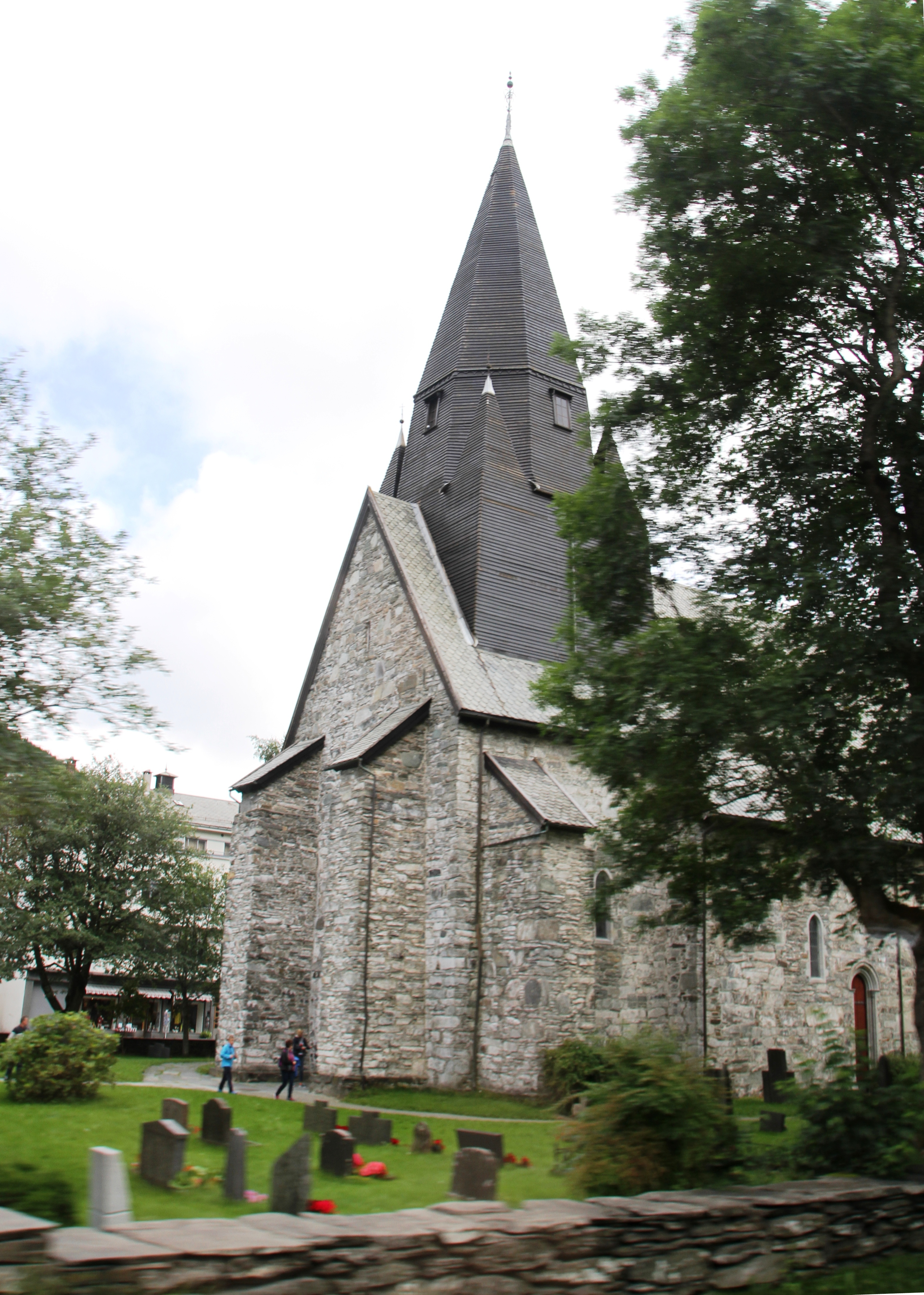
Voss Church

According to legend, the people of Voss were forcibly converted to Christianity by King Olav, who later became St. Olav. A stone cross situated in Vossevangen is said to have been erected at this time. The town contains the stone Voss Church from 1277, with a 16th-century eccentric, octagonal steeple. Just outside the village is Finnesloftet, a wooden guildhall believed to be the oldest profane (non-sacred) wooden building in Northern Europe.

After the German invasion of Norway on 9 April 1940, Voss was the main point of mobilisation for the Norwegian Army in the west, as the city of Bergen had already fallen on the first day of the invasion. Although most of the troops mobilised here were transferred by railway to the fighting in the east of the country, the German forces, advancing towards Voss along the railway line from Bergen and from the Hardangerfjord, were met with stiff resistance. In Hardanger (to the south), some of the Germans climbed up the mountains from Ålvik while the rest went through Granvin.

To break down this resistance, the village of Vossavangen was bombed by the Luftwaffe on 24 and 25 April 1940. About a dozen civilians lost their lives in the bombing which completely destroyed the old wood-built town centre. On 26 April, the German forces entered the village, which remained occupied until 8 May 1945.

Today, Voss is an important communications and trade centre for Western Norway. Voss centre is cosy, with a multitude of small shops. The AMFI Voss is located in the centre of Voss and is a modern shopping centre with over 30 shops. The three large hotels Scandic Voss, Fleischers Hotel and Park Hotel Vossevangen are all located in the town. Fleischers Hotel is the main historic hotel in Voss. The hotel was completed in 1889 in the Swiss style. Vossabadet is an indoor swimming center with three different pools. It also features a sauna, a waterslide, and a café.

There is a new gondola, that starts at Voss Station and ends at Hangurstoppen. Hangurstoppen is the ideal starting point for a hike and there is a restaurant as well. The gondola runs continuously throughout the day – all year.

Vossavangen is host to several festivals and events, such as the Vossa Jazz Festival, the Voss Cup, which is Norway's biggest football tournament for children, Ekstremsportveko (the Extreme Sport Festival ), and Osafestivalen, which is a folk music festival with long traditions that is held in October. In winter it is a great place for downhill skiing, cross country skiing, ski touring and backcountry skiing. There are two ski resorts, Voss Resort and Myrkdalen.

=== Etymology ===
Vossevangen takes its name from the Old Norwegian word "vang" (Old Norse: Vangr) which means "field" or "meadow", and refers to the large grass field lying between Voss Church and the lake Vangsvatnet.
