= Vangsvatnet =

Lake in Voss, Norway

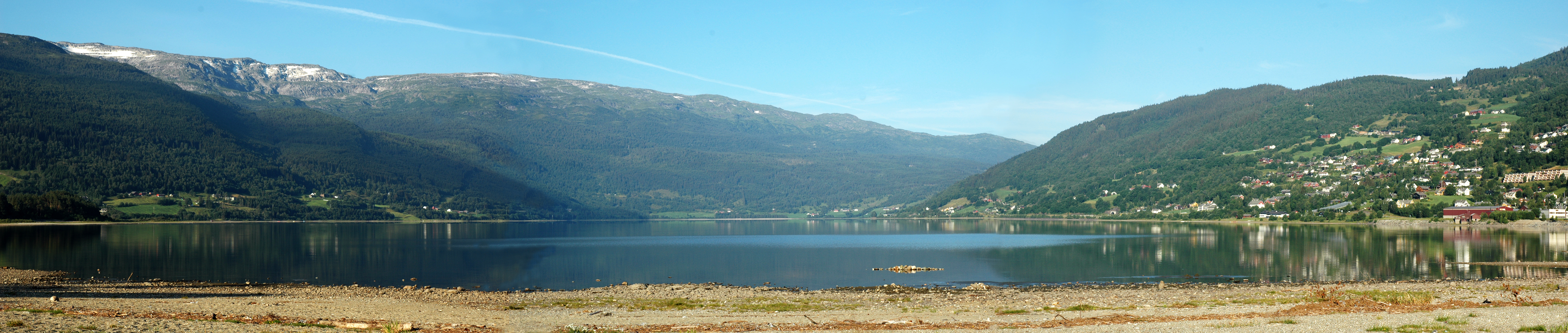
- Panorama of Vangsvatnet as seen from Vossevangen
- Interactive map of Vangsvatnet
- Location: Voss Municipality, Vestland
- Coordinates: 60.6094°N 6.35729°E
- Basin countries: Norway
- Max. length: 9 kilometres (5.6 mi)
- Max. width: 1.5 kilometres (0.93 mi)
- Surface area: 7.69 km^{2} (2.97 sq mi)
- Shore length^{1}: 19.57 kilometres (12.16 mi)
- Surface elevation: 47 metres (154 ft)
- Settlements: Vossavangen
- References: NVE
- ^{1} Shore length is not a well-defined measure.

Vangsvatnet is a lake in Voss Municipality in Vestland county, Norway. The 7.69-square-kilometre (2.97 sq mi) lake lies in the central part of the municipality, on the southwestern shore of the municipal centre of Vossavangen. The river Vosso flows through both the lake Vangsvatnet and the lake Evangervatnet before it empties into Bolstadfjorden by the village of Bolstadøyri to the west.

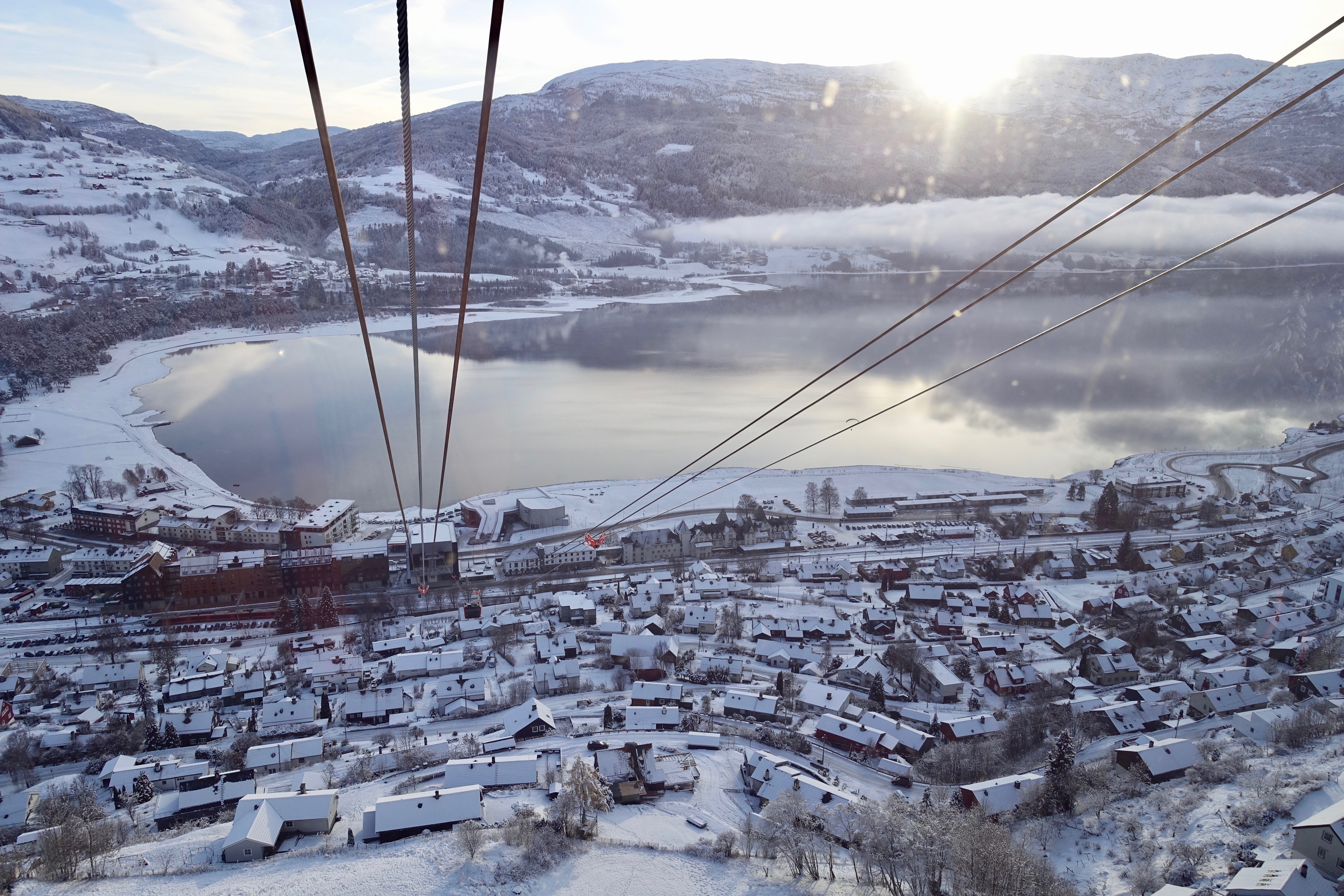
Winter view from the Voss Gondol aerial tramway.

The lake is used for various water-based extreme sports activities like Kite surfing and boat dragged paragliding. Other activities include paddleboarding, windsurfing and canoeing with Voss Flow. It is equally popular with tourists who like to rent out water equipment from local providers, such as Outdoor Norway, located right beside the lake's shore. Vangsvatnet is named after the place Vangen—the municipal center and site of the old Voss Church. The last element is the finite form of vatn, meaning lake. European route E16 and the Bergen Line both run along the northern shore of the lake.

== See also ==
- List of lakes in Norway
