= Evangervatnet =

Lake in Norway

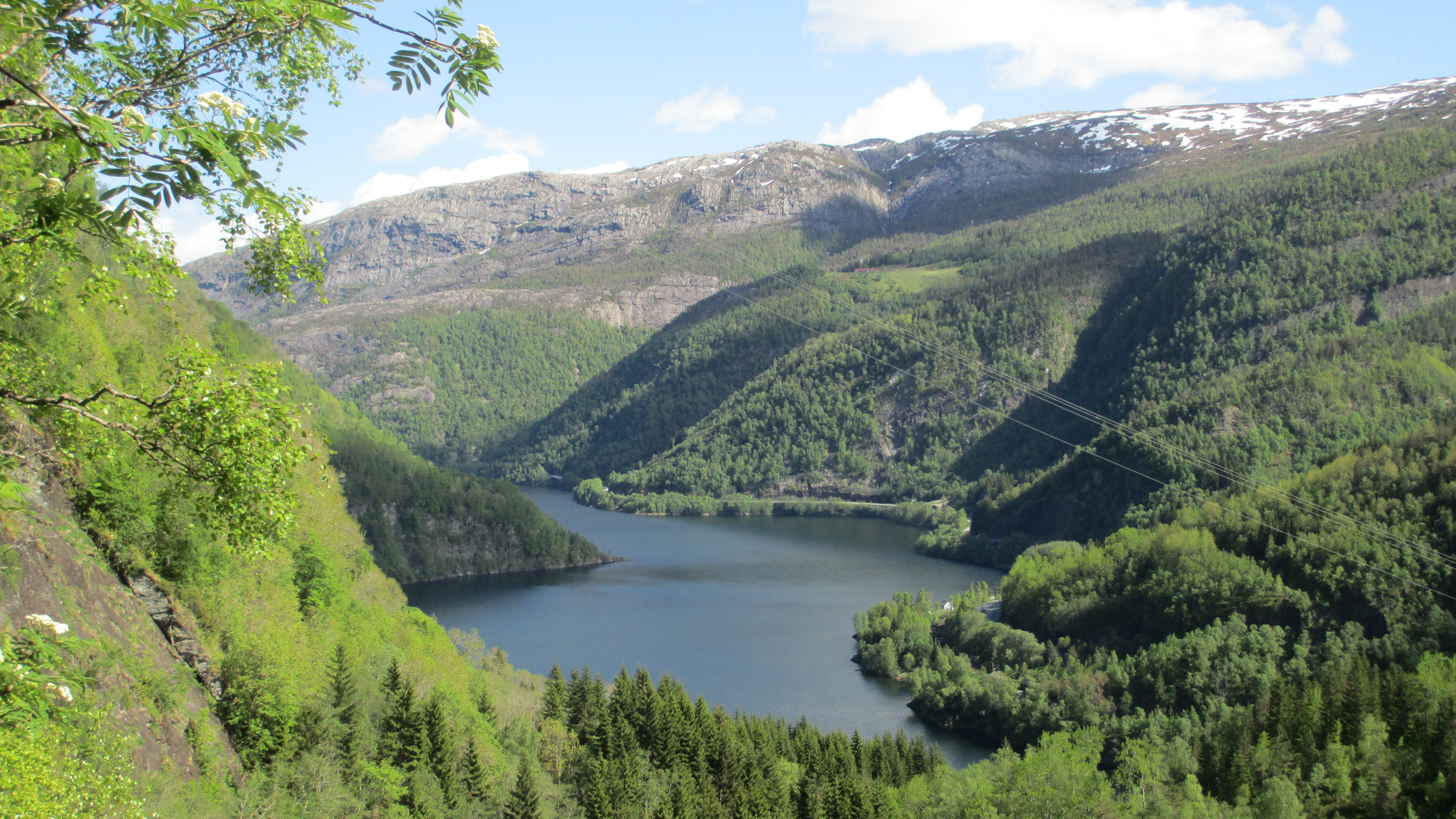
- View of the lake
- Interactive map of Evangervatnet
- Location: Voss Municipality, Vestland
- Coordinates: 60°39′00″N 6°3′48″E
- Basin countries: Norway
- Max. length: 6 kilometres (3.7 mi)
- Max. width: 1 kilometre (0.62 mi)
- Surface area: 2.96 km^{2} (1.14 sq mi)
- Shore length^{1}: 15.4 kilometres (9.6 mi)
- Surface elevation: 11 metres (36 ft)
- Settlements: Evanger
- References: NVE
- ^{1} Shore length is not a well-defined measure.

Evangervatnet (lit. 'Lake Evanger') is a lake in Voss Municipality in Vestland county, Norway. The Vosso River flows through both Vangsvatnet and Evangervatnet before it empties into Bolstadfjorden by the village of Bolstadøyri.

European route E16 highway and the Bergen Line both run along the southern shore of the lake. The northern shore of the lake is mostly mountainous and uninhabited.

== See also ==
- List of lakes in Norway
