= Fjord =

Long, narrow inlet with steep sides or cliffs, created by glacial activity

Geirangerfjord, Norway

In physical geography, a fjord (/ˈfjɔːrd, fiˈɔːrd/ FYORD, fee-ORD; also spelled fiord, a variant most common in New Zealand English) is a long, relatively narrow sea inlet with steep sides or cliffs in a valley created by a former glacier, which has since become inundated with water. They are the glacial equivalent of drowned river valleys, known as rias. Fjords exist on the coasts of Antarctica, the Arctic, and surrounding landmasses of the northern and southern hemispheres. Areas with extensive fjords demonstrate an extreme example of the coastline paradox: Norway's coastline is estimated to be 29,000 km (18,000 mi) long with its nearly 1,200 fjords, but only 2,500 km (1,600 mi) long when excluding the fjords.

== Formation ==
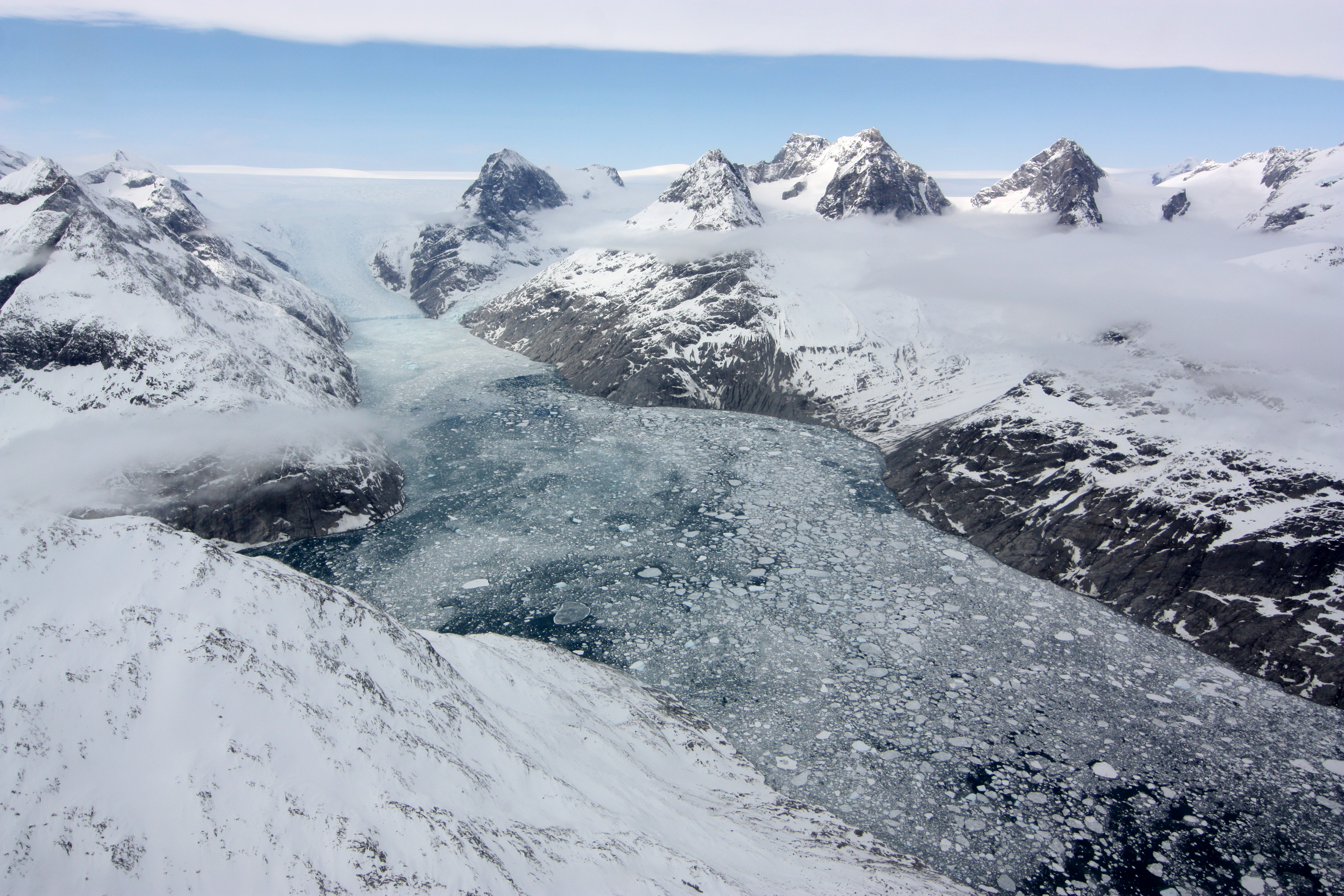
A glacier in eastern Greenland flowing through a fjord carved by the movement of ice

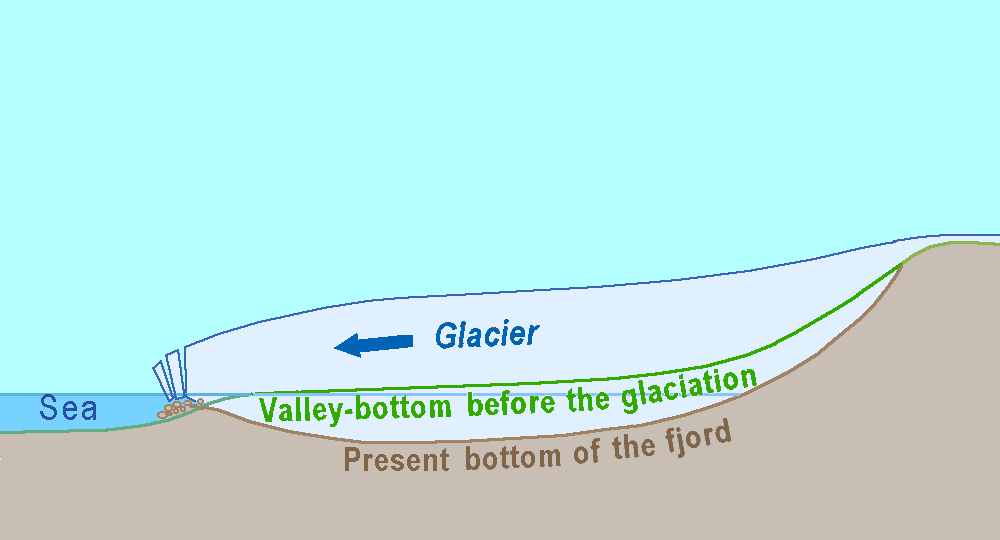
Illustration of how a fjord is created

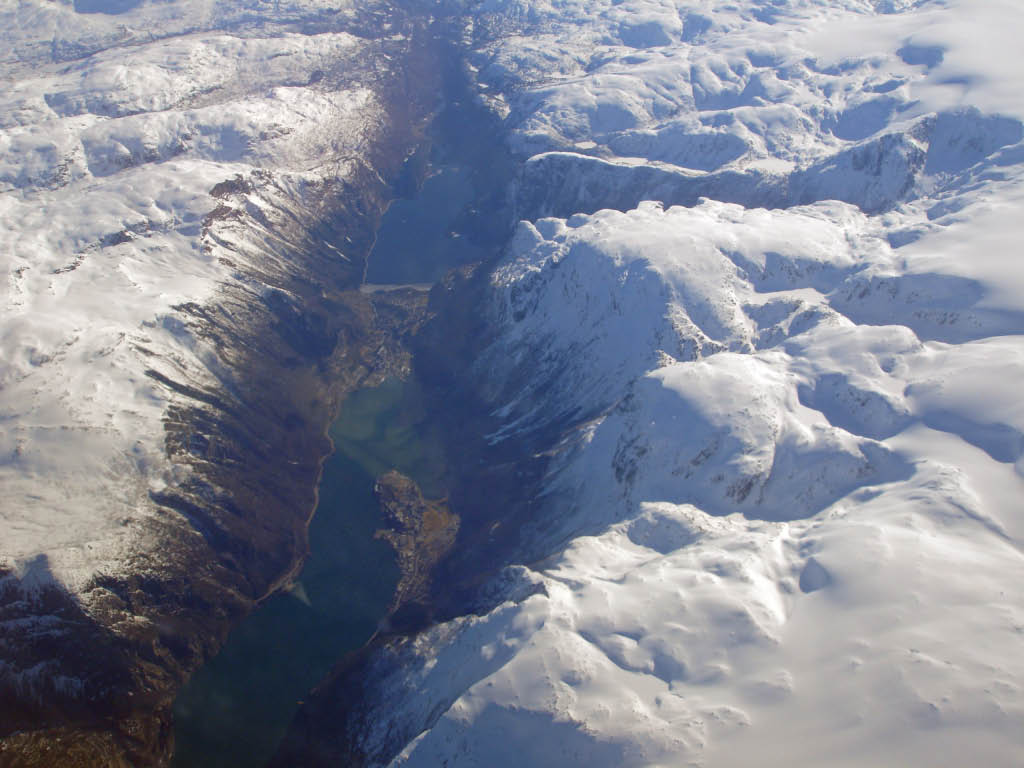
Fjords often continue as U-shaped valleys above sea level and freshwater fjord lakes: Sørfjorden (Hardanger) can be seen here transitioning into Sandvinvatnet and the Odda Valley. Odda sits on the isthmus, Folgefonna on the right.

A fjord is formed when a glacier cuts a U-shaped valley by ice segregation and abrasion of the surrounding bedrock. According to the standard model, glaciers formed in pre-glacial valleys with a gently sloping valley floor. The work of the glacier then left an overdeepened U-shaped valley that ends abruptly at a valley or trough end. Such valleys are fjords when flooded by the ocean. Thresholds above sea level create freshwater lakes. Glacial melting is accompanied by the rebounding of Earth's crust as the ice load and eroded sediment is removed (also called isostasy or glacial rebound). In some cases, this rebound is faster than sea level rise. Most fjords are deeper than the adjacent sea; Sognefjord, Norway, reaches as much as 1,300 m (4,265 ft) below sea level. Fjords generally have a sill or shoal (bedrock) at their mouth caused by the previous glacier's reduced erosion rate and terminal moraine. In many cases this sill causes extreme currents and large saltwater rapids (see skookumchuck). Saltstraumen in Norway is often described as the world's strongest tidal current. These characteristics distinguish fjords from rias (such as the Bay of Kotor), which are drowned valleys flooded by the rising sea. Drammensfjorden is cut almost in two by the Svelvik "ridge", a sandy moraine that was below sea level when it was covered by ice, but after the post-glacial rebound reaches 60 m (200 ft) above the fjord.

In the 19th century, Jens Esmark introduced the theory that fjords are or have been created by glaciers and that large parts of Northern Europe had been covered by thick ice in prehistory. Thresholds at the mouths and overdeepening of fjords compared to the ocean are the strongest evidence of glacial origin, and these thresholds are mostly rocky. Thresholds are related to sounds and low land where the ice could spread out and therefore have less erosive force. John Walter Gregory argued that fjords are of tectonic origin and that glaciers had a negligible role in their formation. Gregory's views were rejected by subsequent research and publications. In the case of Hardangerfjord the fractures of the Caledonian fold has guided the erosion by glaciers, while there is no clear relation between the direction of Sognefjord and the fold pattern. This relationship between fractures and direction of fjords is also observed in Lyngen. Preglacial, Tertiary rivers presumably eroded the surface and created valleys that later guided the glacial flow and erosion of the bedrock. This may in particular have been the case in Western Norway where the tertiary uplift of the landmass amplified eroding forces of rivers.

Confluence of tributary fjords led to excavation of the deepest fjord basins. Near the very coast, the typical West Norwegian glacier spread out (presumably through sounds and low valleys) and lost their concentration and reduced the glaciers' power to erode leaving bedrock thresholds. Bolstadfjorden is 160 m (520 ft) deep with a threshold of only 1.5 m (4 ft 11 in), while the 1,300 m (4,300 ft) deep Sognefjorden has a threshold around 100 to 200 m (330 to 660 ft) deep. Hardangerfjord is made up of several basins separated by thresholds: The deepest basin Samlafjorden between Jonaneset (Jondal) and Ålvik with a distinct threshold at Vikingneset in Kvam Municipality.

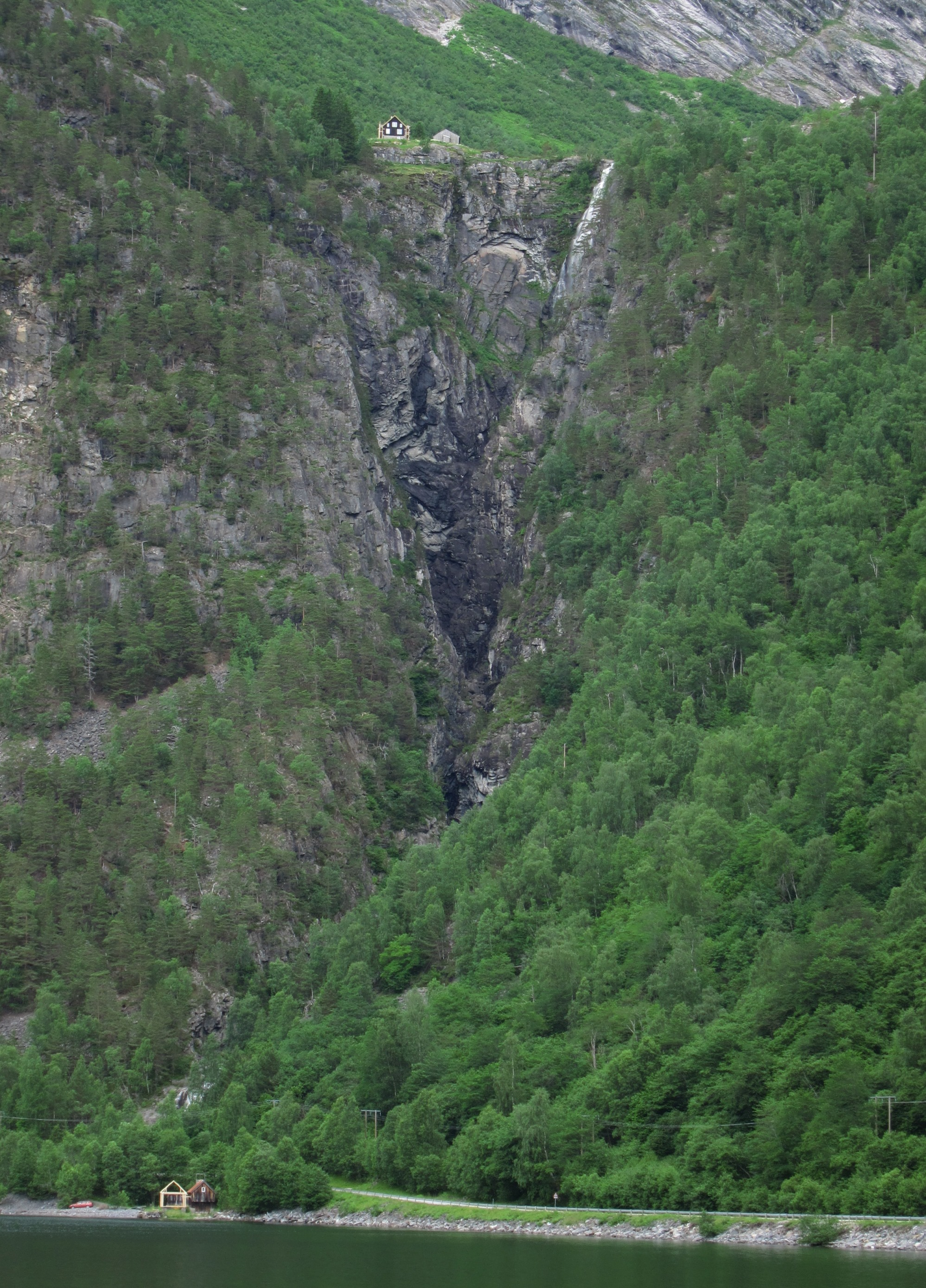
Muldalsfossen waterfall drops several hundred meters from the Muldalen hanging valley to Tafjorden.

Hanging valleys are common along glaciated fjords and U-shaped valleys. A hanging valley is a tributary valley that is higher than the main valley and was created by tributary glacier flows into a glacier of larger volume. The shallower valley appears to be 'hanging' above the main valley or a fjord. Often, waterfalls form at or near the outlet of the upper valley. Small waterfalls within these fjords are also used as freshwater resources. Hanging valleys also occur underwater in fjord systems. The branches of Sognefjord are for instance much shallower than the main fjord. The mouth of Fjærlandsfjord is about 400 m (1,300 ft) deep while the main fjord is 1,200 m (3,900 ft) nearby. The mouth of Ikjefjord is only 50 m (160 ft) deep while the main fjord is around 1,300 m (4,300 ft) at the same point.

== Features and variations ==
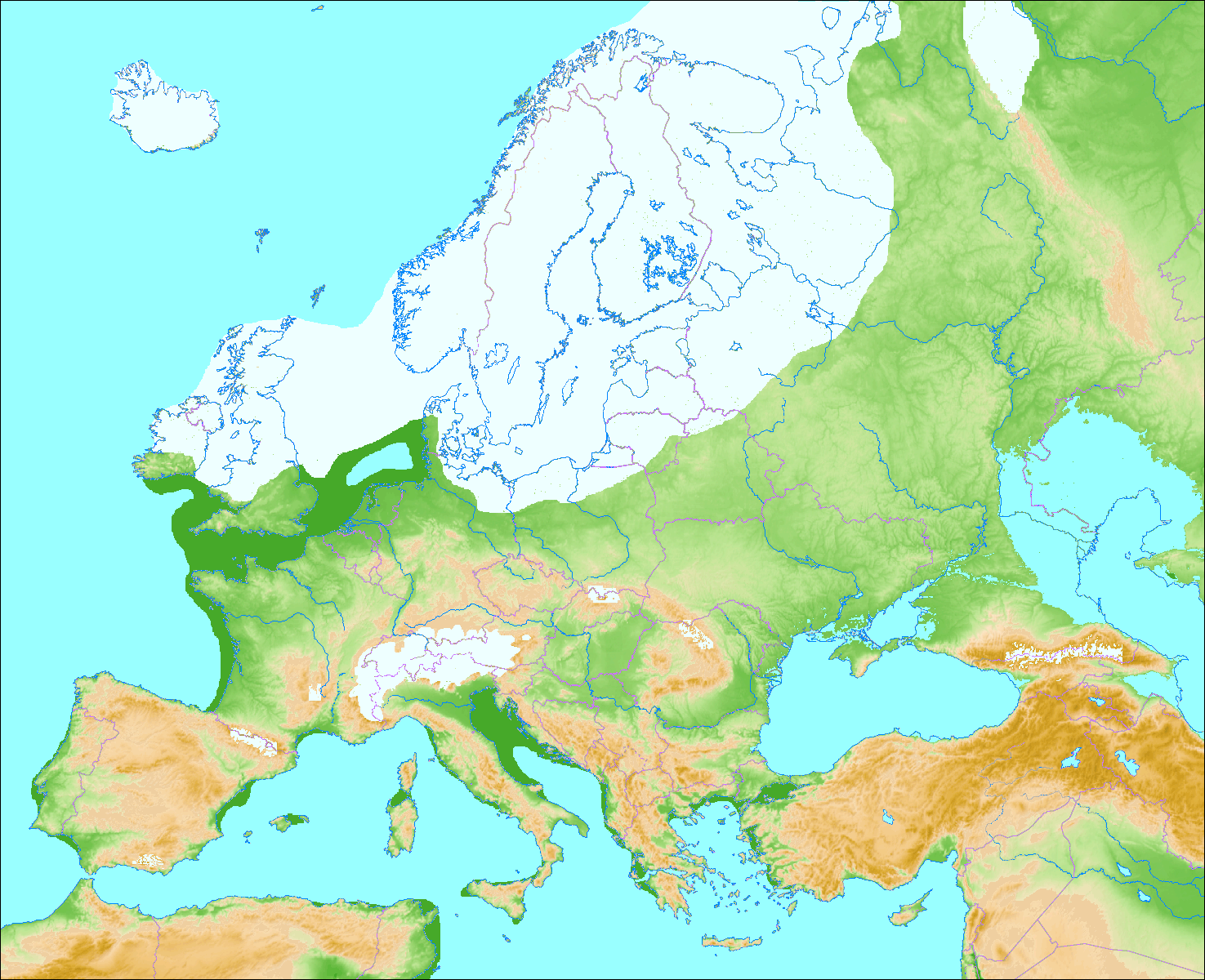
Distribution of ice (white) in Europe during the last glacial period

=== Hydrology ===
During the winter season, there is usually little inflow of water that is fresh. Surface water and deeper water (down to 100 m or 330 ft or more) are mixed during winter because of the steady cooling of the surface and wind. In the deep fjords, there is still fresh water from the summer with less density than the saltier water along the coast. Offshore wind, common in the fjord areas during winter, sets up a current on the surface from the inner to the outer parts. This current on the surface in turn pulls dense salt water from the coast across the fjord threshold and into the deepest parts of the fjord. Bolstadfjorden has a threshold of only 1.5 m (4 ft 11 in) and strong inflow of freshwater from Vosso river creates a brackish surface that blocks circulation of the deep fjord. The deeper, salt layers of Bolstadfjorden are deprived of oxygen and the seabed is covered with organic material. The shallow threshold also creates a strong tidal current.

During the summer season, there is usually a large inflow of river water in the inner areas. This freshwater gets mixed with saltwater creating a layer of brackish water with a slightly higher surface than the ocean which in turn sets up a current from the river mouths towards the ocean. This current is gradually more salty towards the coast and right under the surface current there is a reverse current of saltier water from the coast. In the deeper parts of the fjord the cold water remaining from winter is still and separated from the atmosphere by the brackish top layer. This deep water is ventilated by mixing with the upper layer causing it to warm and freshen over the summer. In fjords with a shallow threshold or low levels of mixing this deep water is not replaced every year and low oxygen concentration makes the deep water unsuitable for fish and animals. In the most extreme cases, there is a constant barrier of freshwater on the surface and the fjord freezes over such that there is no oxygen below the surface. Drammensfjorden is one example. The mixing in fjords predominantly results from the propagation of an internal tide from the entrance sill or internal seiching.

The Gaupnefjorden branch of Sognefjorden is strongly affected by freshwater as a glacial river flows in. Velfjorden has little inflow of freshwater.

=== Coral reefs ===
In 2000, some coral reefs were discovered along the bottoms of the Norwegian fjords. These reefs were found in fjords from the north of Norway to the south. The marine life on the reefs is believed to be one of the most important reasons why the Norwegian coastline is such a generous fishing ground. Since this discovery is fairly new, little research has been done. The reefs are host to thousands of lifeforms such as plankton, coral, anemones, fish, several species of shark, and many more. Most are specially adapted to life under the greater pressure of the water column above it, and the total darkness of the deep sea.

New Zealand's fjords are also host to deep-water corals, but a surface layer of dark fresh water allows these corals to grow in much shallower water than usual. An underwater observatory in Milford Sound allows tourists to view them without diving.

=== Skerries ===
In some places near the seaward margins of areas with fjords, the ice-scoured channels are so numerous and varied in direction that the rocky coast is divided into thousands of island blocks, some large and mountainous while others are merely rocky points or rock reefs, menacing navigation. These are called skerries. The term skerry is derived from the Old Norse sker, which means a rock in the sea.

Skerries most commonly formed at the outlet of fjords where submerged glacially formed valleys perpendicular to the coast join with other cross valleys in a complex array. The island fringe of Norway is such a group of skerries (called a skjærgård); many of the cross fjords are so arranged that they parallel the coast and provide a protected channel behind an almost unbroken succession of mountainous islands and skerries. By this channel, one can travel through a protected passage almost the entire 1,601 km (995 mi) route from Stavanger to North Cape, Norway. The Blindleia is a skerry-protected waterway that starts near Kristiansand in southern Norway and continues past Lillesand. The Swedish coast along Bohuslän is likewise skerry guarded. The Inside Passage provides a similar route from Seattle, Washington, and Vancouver, British Columbia, to Skagway, Alaska. Yet another such skerry-protected passage extends from the Straits of Magellan north for 800 km (500 mi).

=== Phytoplankton ===
Fjords provide unique environmental conditions for phytoplankton communities. In polar fjords, glacier and ice sheet outflow add cold, fresh meltwater along with transported sediment into the body of water. Nutrients provided by this outflow can significantly enhance phytoplankton growth. For example, in some fjords of the West Antarctic Peninsula (WAP), nutrient enrichment from meltwater drives diatom blooms, a highly productive group of phytoplankton that enable such fjords to be valuable feeding grounds for other species. It is possible that as climate change reduces long-term meltwater output, nutrient dynamics within such fjords will shift to favor less productive species, destabilizing the food web ecology of fjord systems.

In addition to nutrient flux, sediment carried by flowing glaciers can become suspended in the water column, increasing turbidity and reducing light penetration into greater depths of the fjord. This effect can limit the available light for photosynthesis in deeper areas of the water mass, reducing phytoplankton abundance beneath the surface.

Overall, phytoplankton abundance and species composition within fjords is highly seasonal, varying as a result of seasonal light availability and water properties that depend on glacial melt and the formation of sea ice. The study of phytoplankton communities within fjords is an active area of research, supported by groups such as FjordPhyto, a citizen science initiative to study phytoplankton samples collected by local residents, tourists, and boaters of all backgrounds.

=== Epishelf lakes ===
An epishelf lake forms when meltwater is trapped behind a floating ice shelf and the freshwater floats on the denser saltwater below. Its surface may freeze, forming an isolated ecosystem.

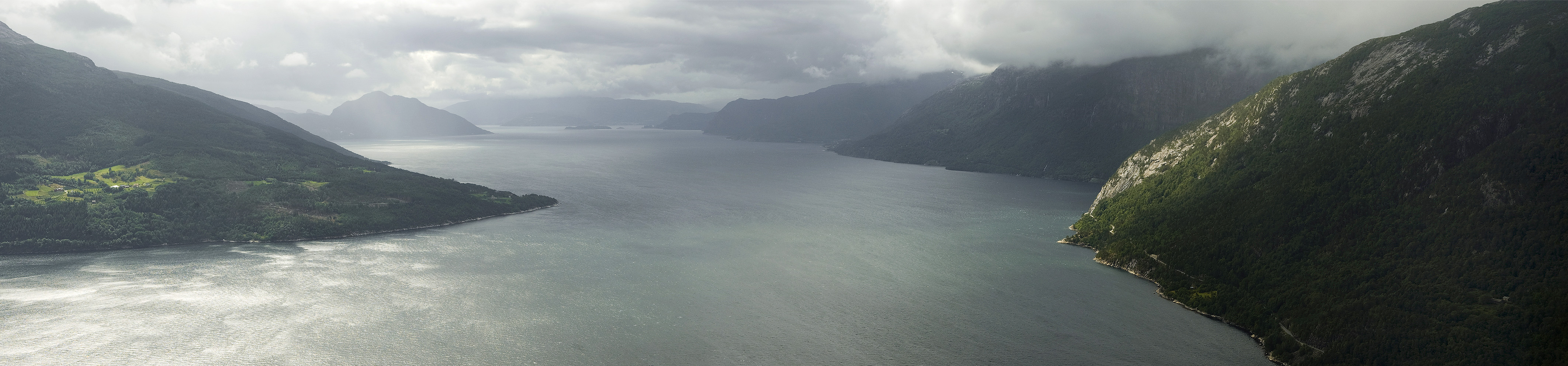
Hardangerfjord in Vestland, Norway

== Etymology ==
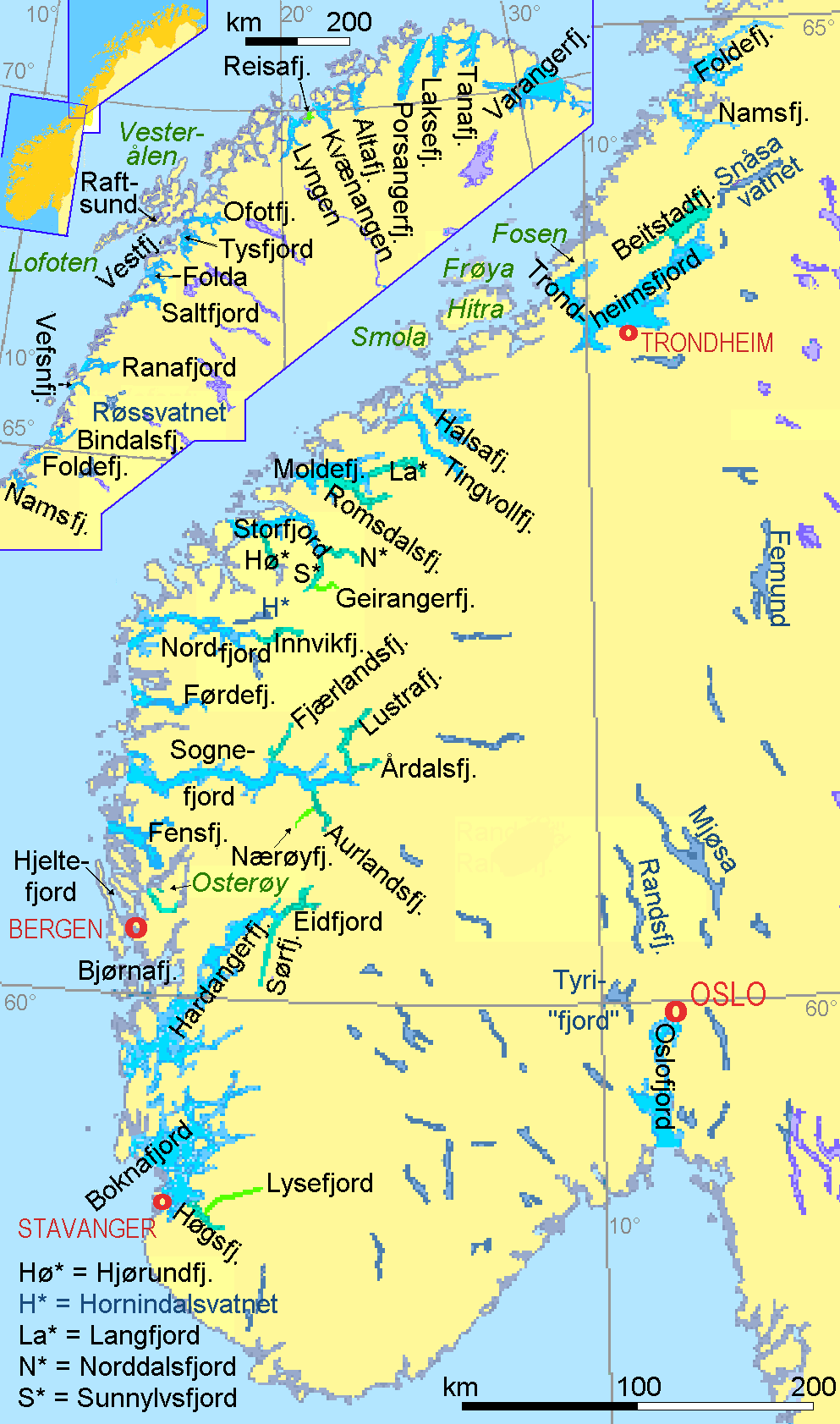
Important fjords and lakes in Norway. Note: The part of the map showing the northern fjords has a considerably smaller scale. Blurred coastlines = skerries

The word fjord is borrowed from Norwegian, where it is pronounced [ˈfjuːr], [ˈfjøːr], [ˈfjuːɽ] or [ˈfjøːɽ] in various dialects and has a more general meaning, referring in many cases to any long, narrow body of water, inlet or channel (for example, see Oslofjord).

The Norwegian word is inherited from Old Norse fjǫrðr, a noun which refers to a 'lake-like' body of water used for passage and ferrying and is closely related to the noun ferð "travelling, ferrying, journey". Both words go back to Indo-European *pértus "crossing", from the root *per- "cross". The words fare and ferry are of the same origin.

The Scandinavian fjord, Proto-Scandinavian *ferþuz, is the origin for similar Germanic words: Icelandic fjörður, Faroese fjørður, Swedish fjärd (for Baltic waterbodies), Scots firth (for marine waterbodies, mainly in Scotland and northern England). The Norse noun fjǫrðr was adopted in German as Förde, used for the narrow long bays of Schleswig-Holstein, and in English as firth "fjord, river mouth". The English word ford (compare German Furt, Low German Ford or Vörde, in Dutch names voorde such as Vilvoorde, Ancient Greek πόρος, poros, and Latin portus) is assumed to originate from Germanic *ferþu- and Indo-European root *pertu- meaning "crossing point". Fjord/firth/Förde as well as ford/Furt/Vörde/voorde refer to a Germanic noun for a travel: North Germanic ferd or färd and of the verb to travel, Dutch varen, German fahren; English to fare.

As a loanword from Norwegian, it is one of the few words in the English language to start with the sequence fj. The word was for a long time normally spelled fiord, a spelling preserved in place names such as Grise Fiord. The fiord spelling mostly remains only in New Zealand English, as in the place name Fiordland.

=== Scandinavian usage ===
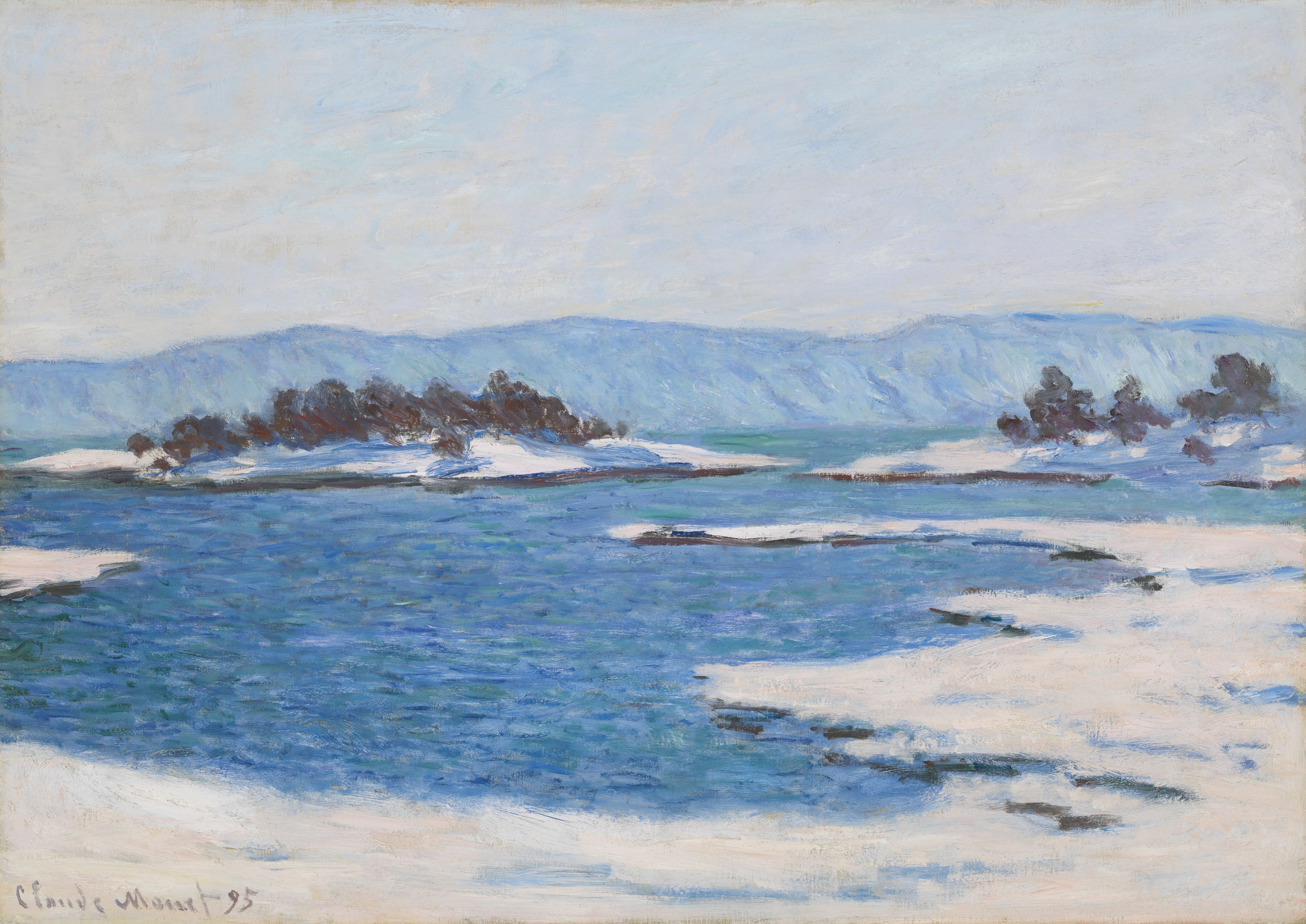
Fjord à Christiania, by Claude Monet (1895)

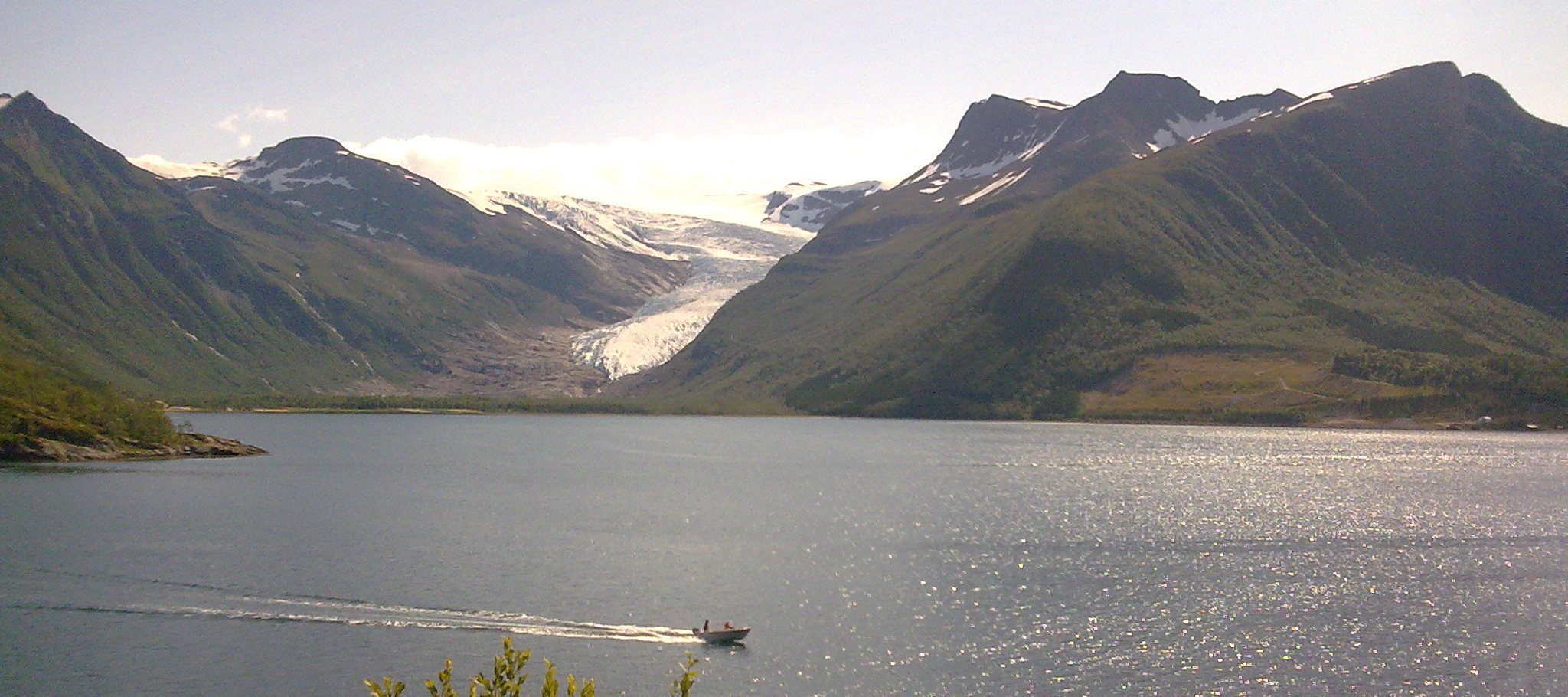
Holandsfjorden with Svartisen glacier in Nordland

The use of the word fjord in Norwegian, Danish and Swedish is more general than in English and in international scientific terminology. In Scandinavia, fjord is used for a narrow inlet of the sea in Norway, Denmark and western Sweden, but this is not its only application. On the west coast of Sweden, fjord is sometimes also used in reference to large areas of open water between the coast and an archipelago (skärgård), in much the same way as the word fjärd (fjard) is often used. In Norway and Iceland, the usage is closest to the Old Norse, with fjord used for both a firth and for a long, narrow inlet. In eastern Norway, the term is also applied to long narrow freshwater lakes (Randsfjorden and Tyrifjorden) and sometimes even to rivers (for instance in Flå Municipality in Hallingdal, the Hallingdal river is referred to as fjorden). In Danish, the word may even apply to shallow lagoons. In modern Icelandic, fjörður is still used with the broader meaning of firth or inlet. In Faroese fjørður is used both about inlets and about broader sounds, whereas a narrower sound is called sund. In Finnish, a word vuono is used although there is only one fjord in Finland.

In old Norse the genitive was fjarðar whereas dative was *firði. The dative form has become common place names like Førde (for instance Førde), Fyrde or Førre (for instance Førre).

The German use of the word Föhrde for long narrow bays on their Baltic Sea coastline, indicates a common Germanic origin of the word. The landscape consists mainly of moraine heaps. The Föhrden and some "fjords" on the east side of Jutland, Denmark are also of glacial origin. But while the glaciers digging "real" fjords moved from the mountains to the sea, in Denmark and Germany they were tongues of a huge glacier covering the basin of which is now the Baltic Sea. See Förden and East Jutland Fjorde.

Whereas fjord names mostly describe bays (though not always geological fjords), straits in the same regions typically are named sund, in Scandinavian languages as well as in German. The word is related to the verb "sunder" in the meaning of "to separate". So the use of sound to name fjords in North America and New Zealand differs from the European meaning of that word.

The name of Wexford in Ireland is originally derived from Veisafjǫrðr ("inlet of the mud flats") in Old Norse, as used by the Viking settlers—though the inlet at that place in modern terms is an estuary, not a fjord. Similarly the name of Milford (now Milford Haven) in Wales is derived from Melrfjǫrðr ("sandbank fjord/inlet"), though the inlet on which it is located is actually a ria.

Before or in the early phase of Old Norse angr was another common noun for fjords and other inlets of the ocean. This word has survived only as a suffix in names of some Scandinavian fjords and has in same cases also been transferred to adjacent settlements or surrounding areas for instance Hardanger, Stavanger, and Geiranger.

== Differences in definitions ==
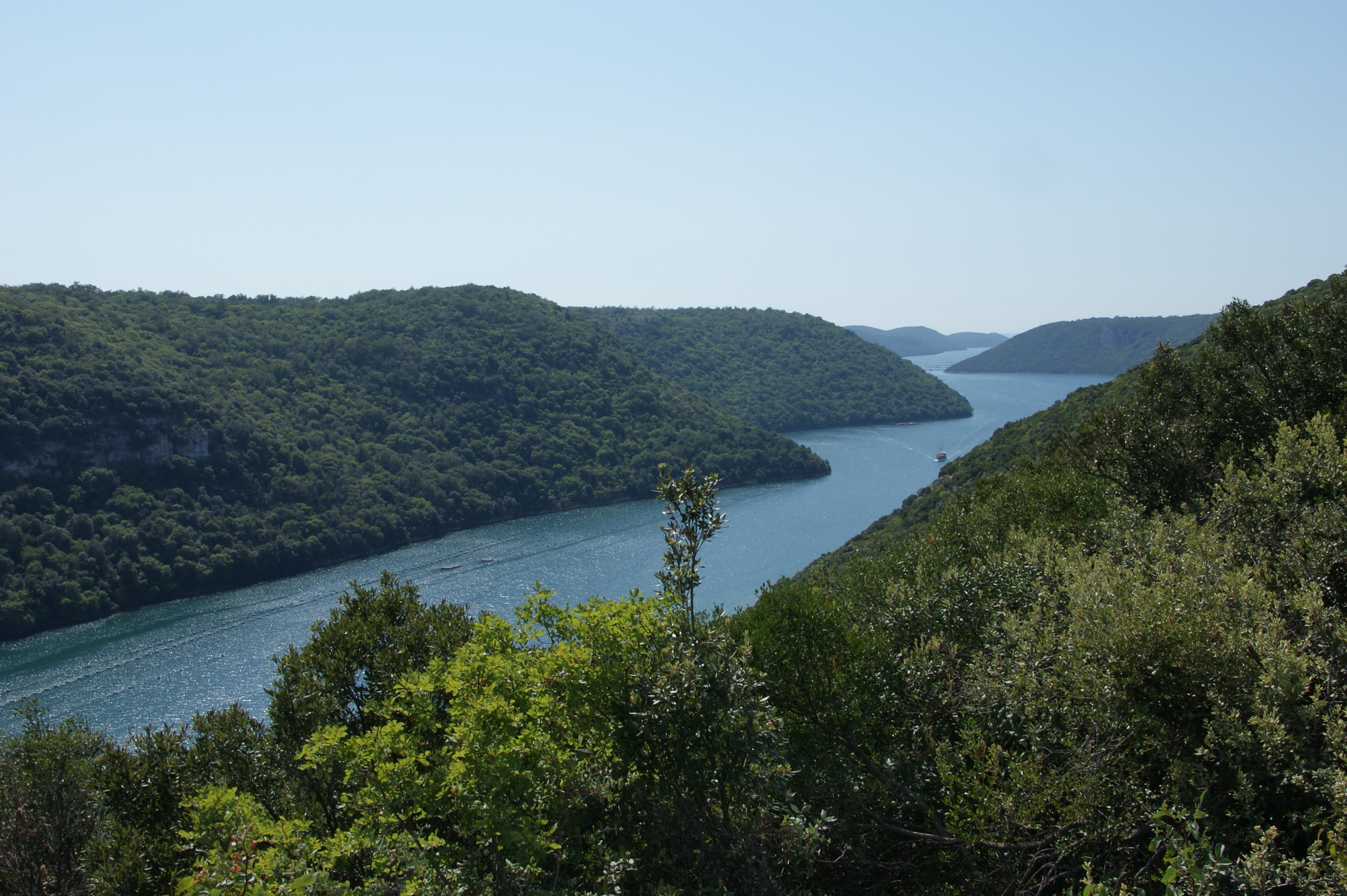
The Lim bay in Croatia is commonly called a fjord but is scientifically a ria.

The differences in usage between the English and the Scandinavian languages have contributed to confusion in the use of the term fjord. Bodies of water that are clearly fjords in Scandinavian languages are not considered fjords in English; similarly bodies of water that would clearly not be fjords in the Scandinavian sense have been named or suggested to be fjords. Examples of this confused usage follow.

In the Danish language some inlets are called a fjord, but are, according to the English language definition, technically not a fjord, such as Roskilde Fjord. Limfjord in English terminology is a sound, since it separates the North Jutlandic Island (Vendsyssel-Thy) from the rest of Jutland. However, the Limfjord once was a fjord until the sea broke through from the west. Ringkøbing Fjord on the western coast of Jutland is a lagoon. The long narrow fjords of Denmark's Baltic Sea coast like the German Förden were dug by ice moving from the sea upon land, while fjords in the geological sense were dug by ice moving from the mountains down to the sea. However, one definition of a fjord is: "A long narrow inlet consisting of only one inlet created by glacial activity". Examples of Danish fjords are: Kolding Fjord, Vejle Fjord and Mariager Fjord.

The fjords in Finnmark in Norway, which are fjords in the Scandinavian sense of the term, are not universally considered to be fjords by the scientific community, because although glacially formed, most Finnmark fjords lack the steep-sided valleys of the more southerly Norwegian fjords. The glacial pack was deep enough to cover even the high grounds when they were formed. The Oslofjord, on the other hand, is a rift valley, and not glacially formed.

The indigenous Māori people of New Zealand see a fjord as a kind of sea (Māori: tai) that runs by a bluff (matapari, altogether tai matapari "bluff sea").

=== "Fjords" not created by glaciers ===
The term "fjord" is sometimes applied to steep-sided inlets which were not created by glaciers. Most such inlets are drowned river canyons or rias. Examples include:

- In Acapulco, Mexico, the calanques (narrow, rocky inlets) on the western side of the city, where the famous cliff-divers perform daily, are described in the city's tourist literature as being fjords.
- The calanques of Parc national des Calanques, Provence, France, are also referred to as fjords.
- Camel Estuary at Padstow, Cornwall, England, is sometimes referred to as a fjord. despite being classified as a ria.
- The Fiordo di Furore in Italy is actually a ria.
- Golfo Dulce in Puntarenas, Costa Rica. Like the Saco de Mamangua below, it is sometimes described as a "tropical fjord".
- The Khor ash Sham in the Musandam Peninsula in Oman, and other "khors" or inlets in the deeply indented coast of Musandam, are often described as "fjords". They were formed by the subduction of the Arabian tectonic plate beneath the Eurasian plate.
- Bay of Kotor in Montenegro
- the Lim bay in Istria, Croatia, is sometimes called "Lim fjord" although it is a ria dug by the river Pazinčica. The Croats call it Limski kanal, which does not translate precisely to the English equivalent either.
- Milford Haven Waterway in Pembrokeshire, Wales. This inlet is a ria. The place-name is derived from Old Norse Melrfjordr meaning "sandbank fjord".
- Port Davey in Tasmania, Australia is popularly believed to be a "fjord", but is now thought to be part of a drowned river valley system.
- Saco do Mamanguá in Paraty, Rio de Janeiro, Brazil. Colloquially, it's been labeled the world's "only tropical fjord".

== Freshwater fjords ==
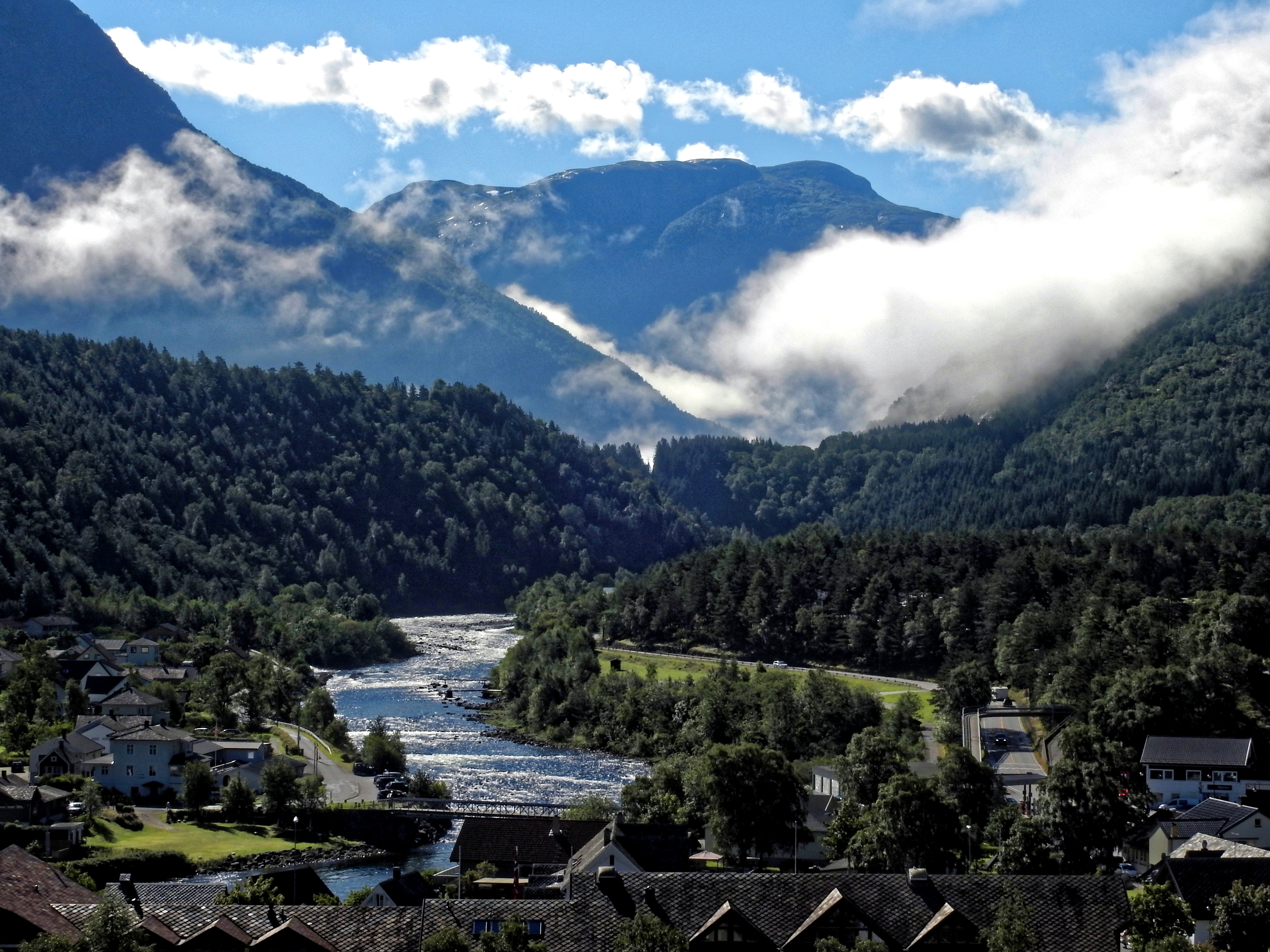
The village of Eidfjord beneath the high terrace, the original ice-age delta. The river has carved a gorge through the terrace.

Some Norwegian freshwater lakes that have formed in long glacially carved valleys with sill thresholds, ice front deltas or terminal moraines blocking the outlet follow the Norwegian naming convention; they are frequently named fjords. Ice front deltas developed when the ice front was relatively stable for long time during the melting of the ice shield. The resulting landform is an isthmus between the lake and the saltwater fjord, in Norwegian called "eid" as in placename Eidfjord or Nordfjordeid. The post-glacial rebound changed these deltas into terraces up to the level of the original sea level. In Eidfjord Municipality, the river Eio has dug through the original delta and left a 110 m (360 ft) terrace while lake is only 19 m (62 ft) above sea level. Such deposits are valuable sources of high-quality building materials (sand and gravel) for houses and infrastructure. Eidfjord village sits on the eid or isthmus between Eidfjordvatnet lake and Eidfjorden branch of Hardangerfjord. Nordfjordeid is the isthmus with a village between Hornindalsvatnet lake and Nordfjorden. Such lakes are also denoted fjord valley lakes by geologists.

One of Norway's largest is Tyrifjorden at 63 m (207 ft) above sea level and an average depth at 97 m (318 ft) most of the lake is under sea level. Norway's largest lake, Mjøsa, is also referred to as "the fjord" by locals. Another example is the freshwater fjord Movatnet (Mo lake) that until 1743 was separated from Romarheimsfjorden by an isthmus and connected by a short river. During a flood in November 1743, the river bed eroded and sea water could flow into the lake at high tide. Eventually, Movatnet became a saltwater fjord and renamed Mofjorden (Mofjorden). Like fjords, freshwater lakes are often deep. For instance Hornindalsvatnet is at least 500 m (1,600 ft) deep and water takes an average of 16 years to flow through the lake. Such lakes created by glacial action are also called fjord lakes or moraine-dammed lakes.

Some of these lakes were salt after the ice age but later cut off from the ocean during the post-glacial rebound. At the end of the ice age Eastern Norway was about 200 m (660 ft) lower (the marine limit). When the ice cap receded and allowed the ocean to fill valleys and lowlands, and lakes like Mjøsa and Tyrifjorden were part of the ocean while Drammen valley was a narrow fjord. At the time of the Vikings Drammensfjord was still four or five m (13 or 16 ft) higher than today and reached the town of Hokksund, while parts of what is now the city of Drammen was under water. After the ice age the ocean was about 150 m (490 ft) at Notodden. The ocean stretched like a fjord through Heddalsvatnet all the way to Hjartdal. Post-glacial rebound eventually separated Heddalsvatnet from the ocean and turned it into a freshwater lake. In Neolithic times Heddalsvatnet was still a saltwater fjord connected to the ocean, and was cut off from the ocean around 1500 BC.

Some freshwater fjords such as Slidrefjord are above the marine limit.

Like freshwater fjords, the continuation of fjords on land are in the same way denoted as fjord-valleys. For instance Flåmsdal (Flåm valley) and Måbødalen.

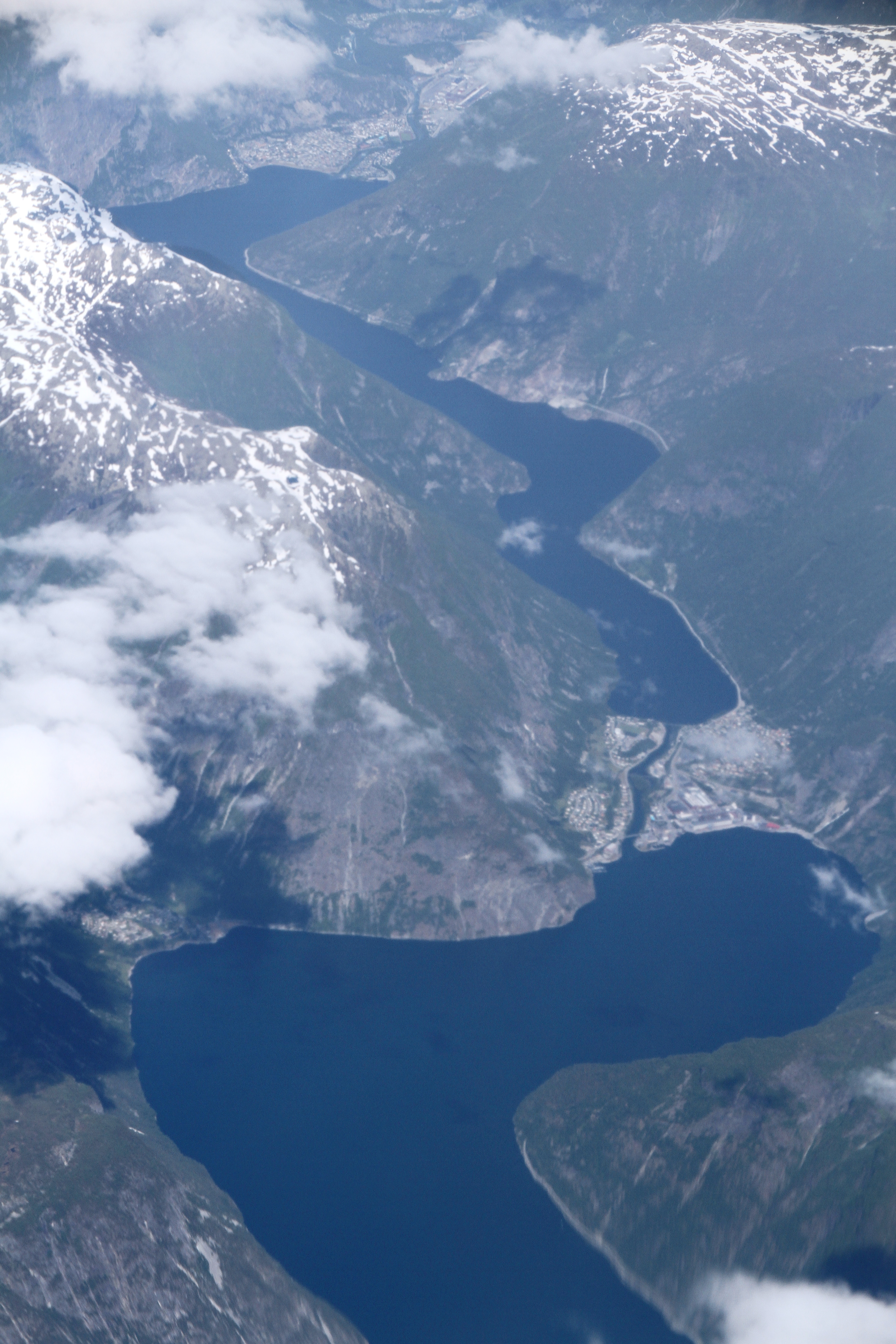
Årdalstangen village on the small isthmus between Årdalsvatnet lake (behind) and Årdalsfjorden branch of Sognefjorden (front)

Outside of Norway, the three western arms of New Zealand's Lake Te Anau are named North Fiord, Middle Fiord and South Fiord. Another freshwater "fjord" in a larger lake is Western Brook Pond, in Newfoundland's Gros Morne National Park; it is also often described as a fjord, but is actually a freshwater lake cut off from the sea, so is not a fjord in the English sense of the term. Locally they refer to it as a "landlocked fjord". Such lakes are sometimes called "fjord lakes". Okanagan Lake was the first North American lake to be so described, in 1962. The bedrock there has been eroded up to 650 m (2,133 ft) below sea level, which is 2,000 m (6,562 ft) below the surrounding regional topography. Fjord lakes are common on the inland lea of the Coast Mountains and Cascade Range; notable ones include Lake Chelan, Seton Lake, Chilko Lake, and Atlin Lake. Kootenay Lake, Slocan Lake and others in the basin of the Columbia River are also fjord-like in nature, and created by glaciation in the same way. Along the British Columbia Coast, a notable fjord-lake is Owikeno Lake, which is a freshwater extension of Rivers Inlet. Quesnel Lake, located in central British Columbia, is claimed to be the deepest fjord formed lake on Earth.

=== Great Lakes ===
A family of freshwater fjords are the embayments of the North American Great Lakes. Baie Fine is located on the northwestern coast of Georgian Bay of Lake Huron in Ontario, and Huron Bay is located on the southern shore of Lake Superior in Michigan.

== Locations ==
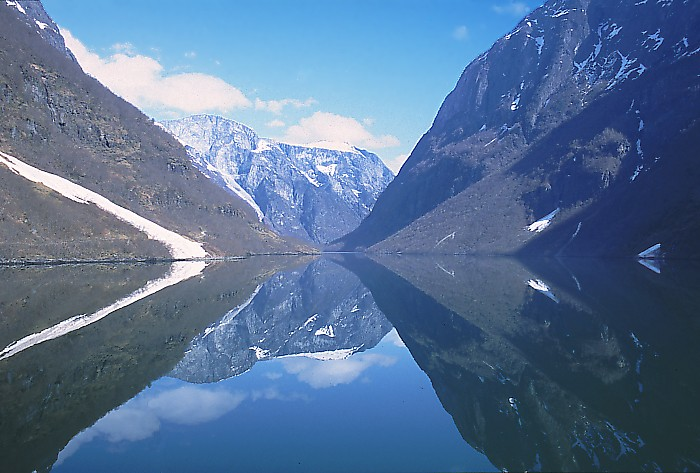
Sognefjord in Norway, the longest fjord in Norway, is a popular tourist attraction

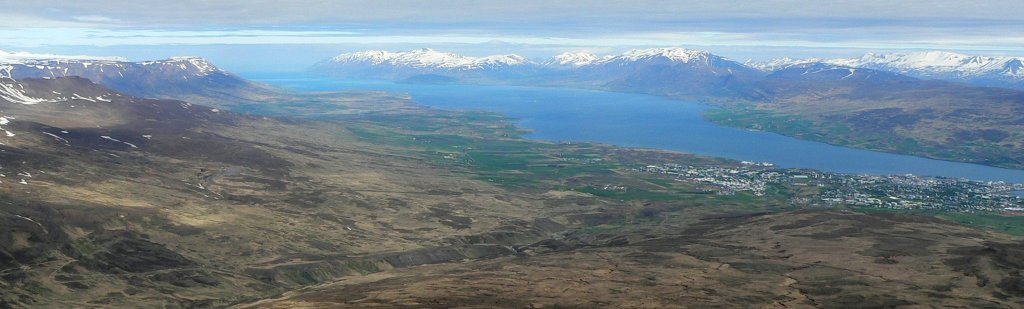
Eyjafjörður in north Iceland, Akureyri can be seen to the far right

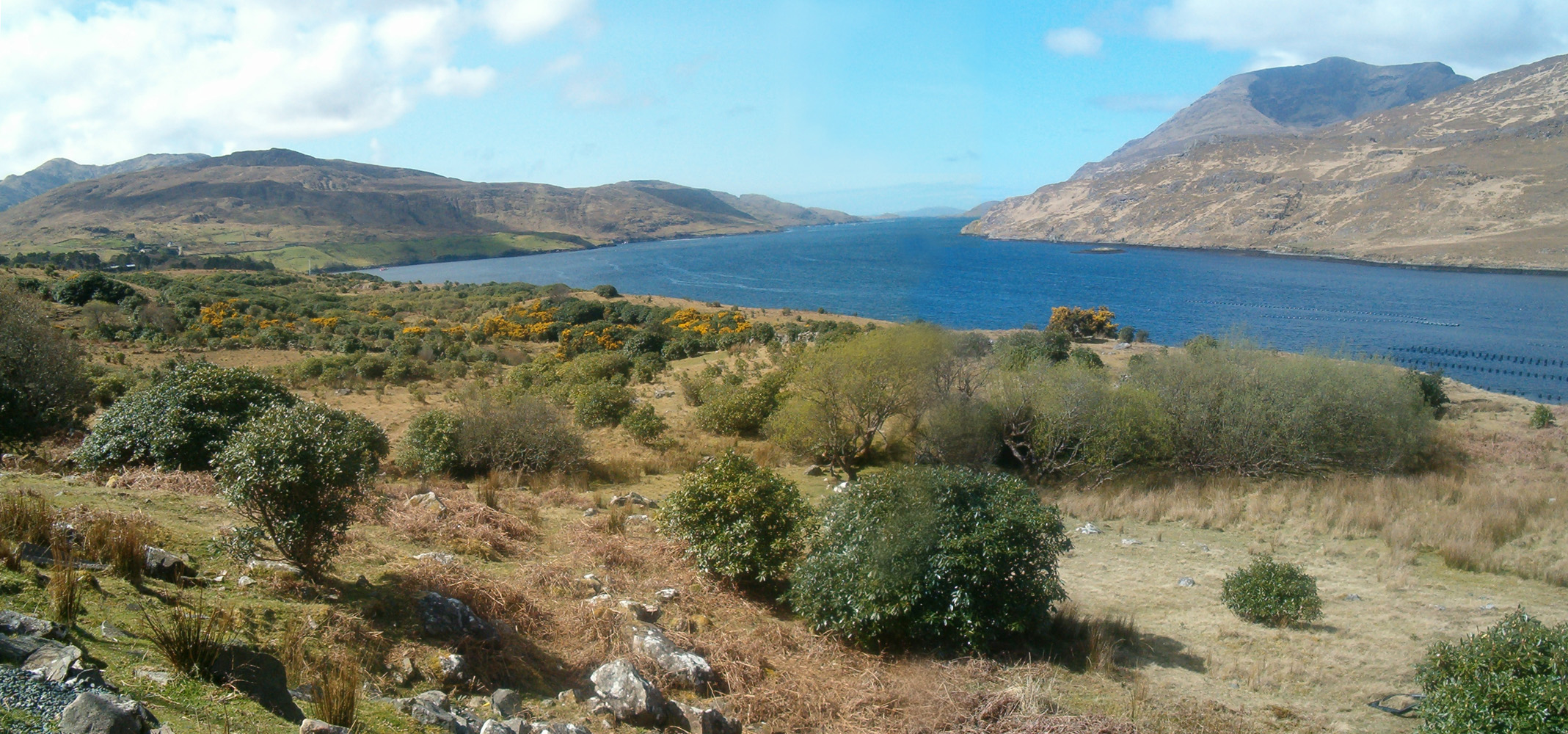
Killary Harbour, western Ireland

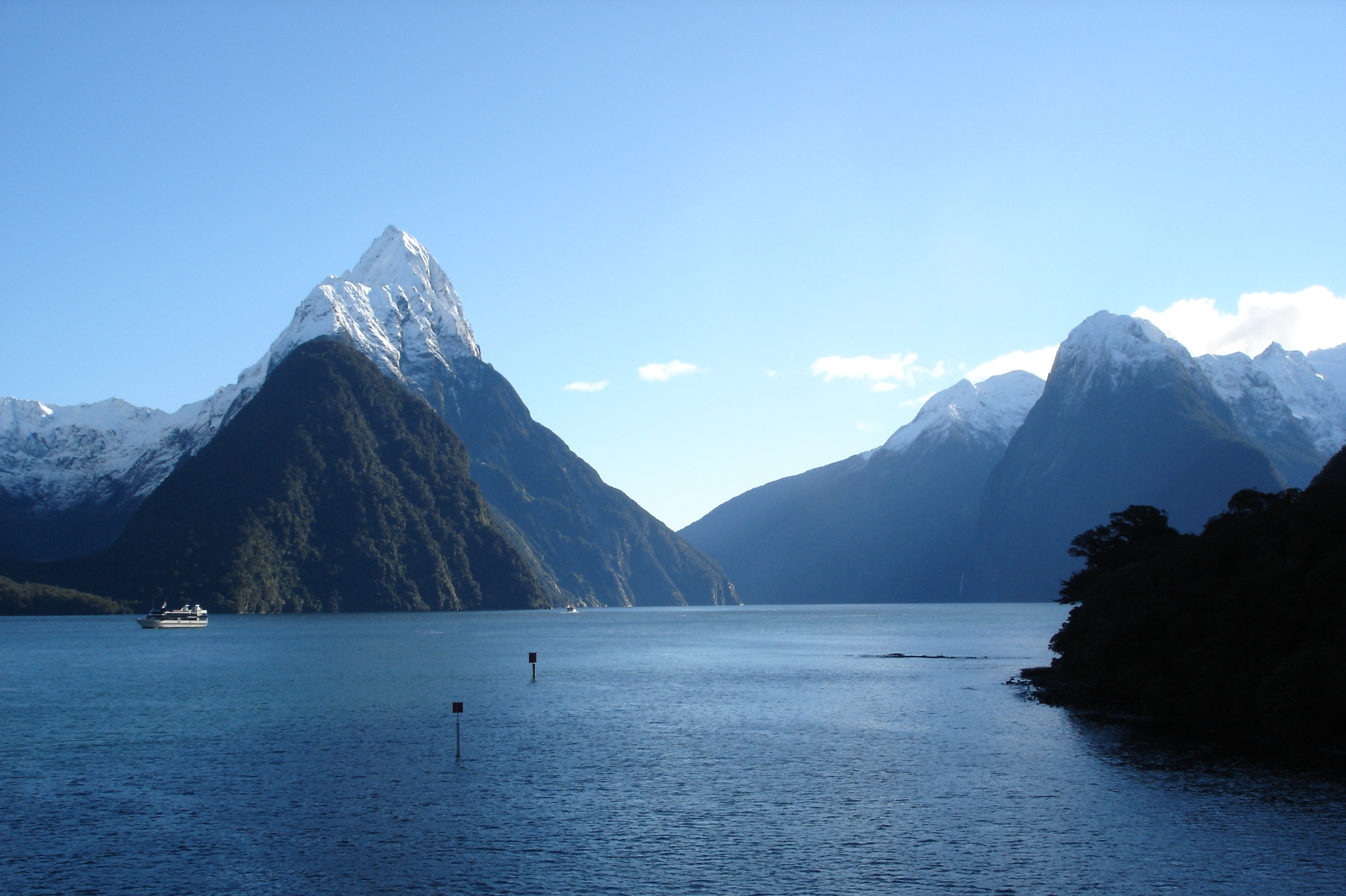
New Zealand's Milford Sound

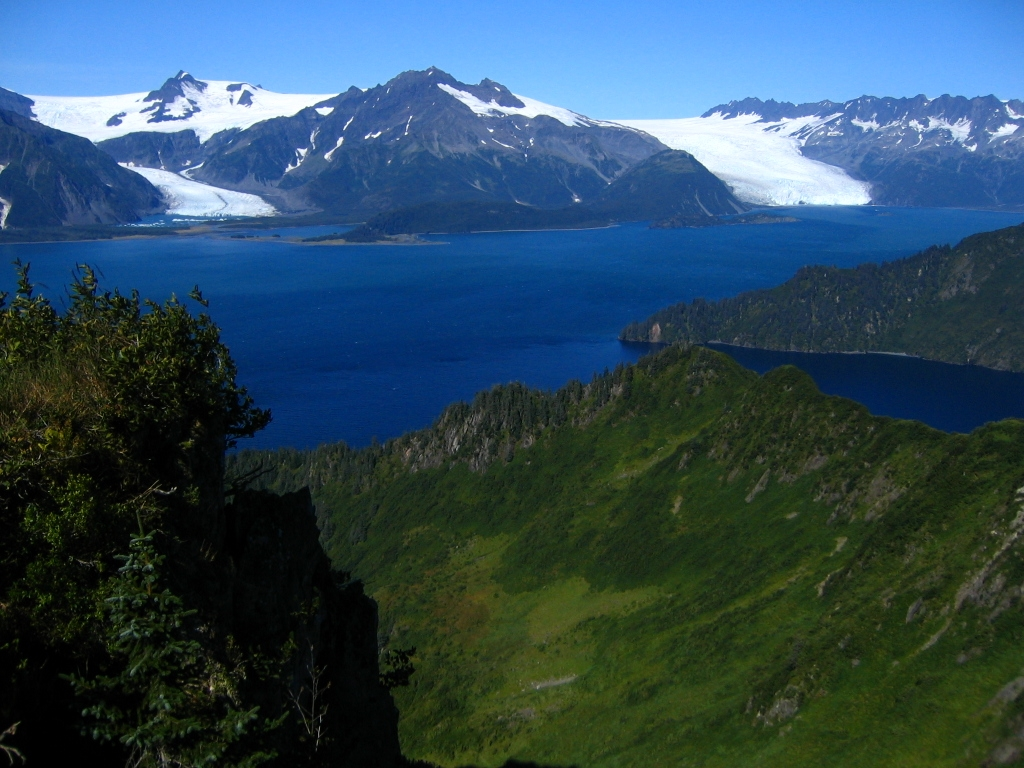
Glacier in a fjord at Kenai Fjords National Park, Alaska

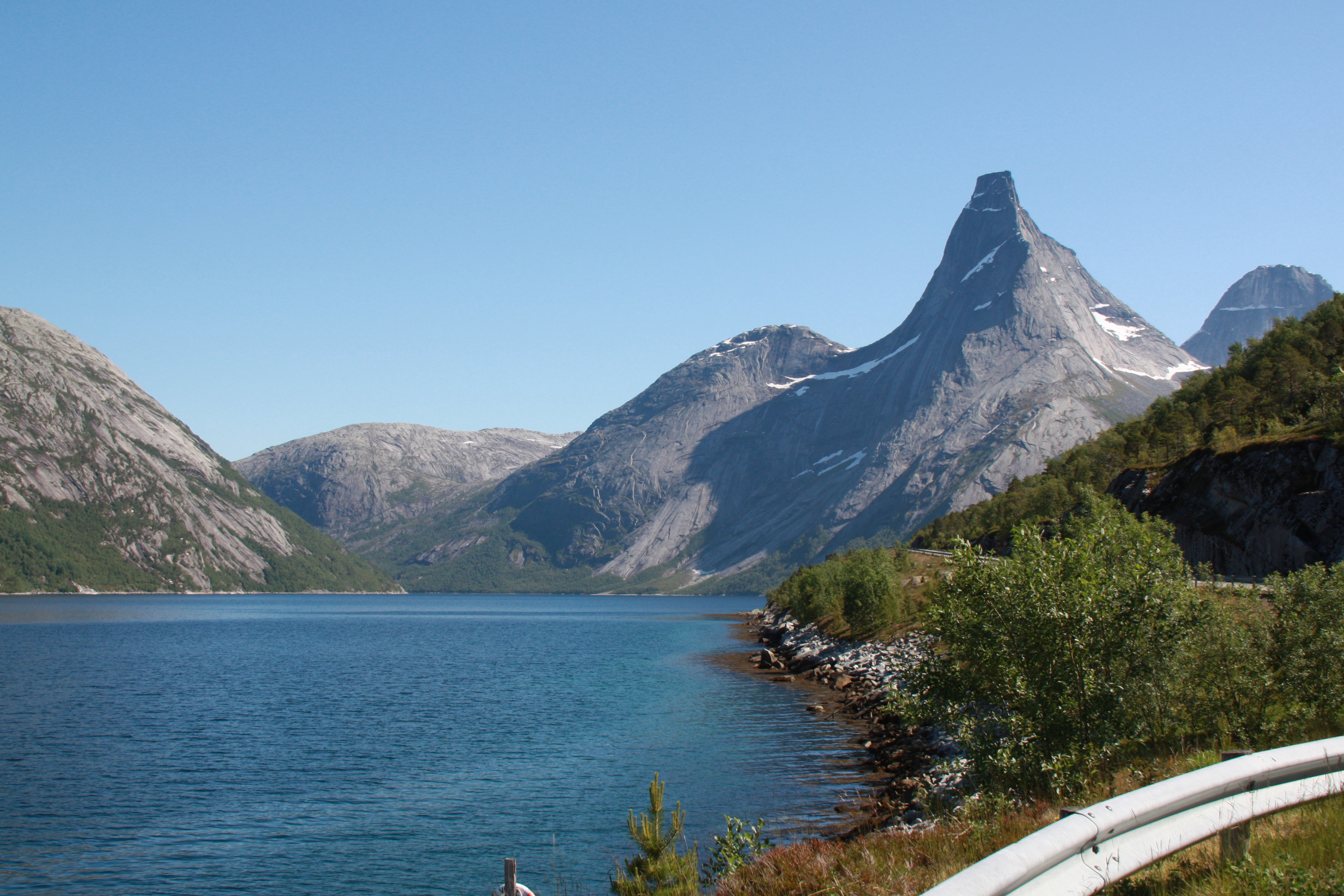
Tysfjorden in Norway north of the Arctic Circle is located in the boreal zone

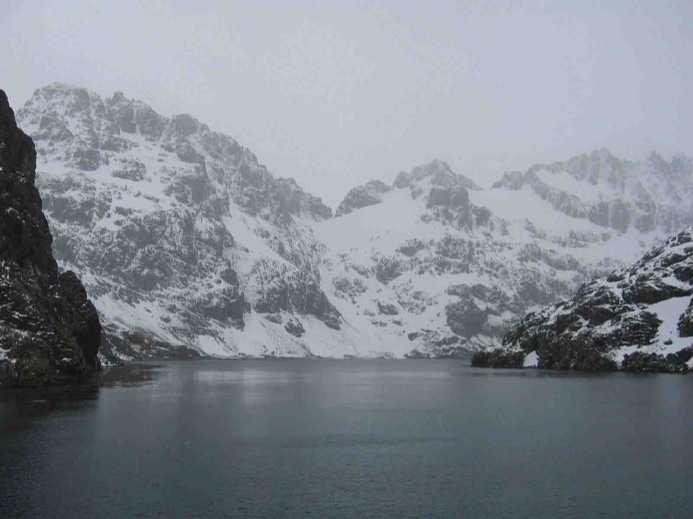
The entrance to Larsen Harbour, a sub-embayment of Drygalski Fjord in South Georgia Island

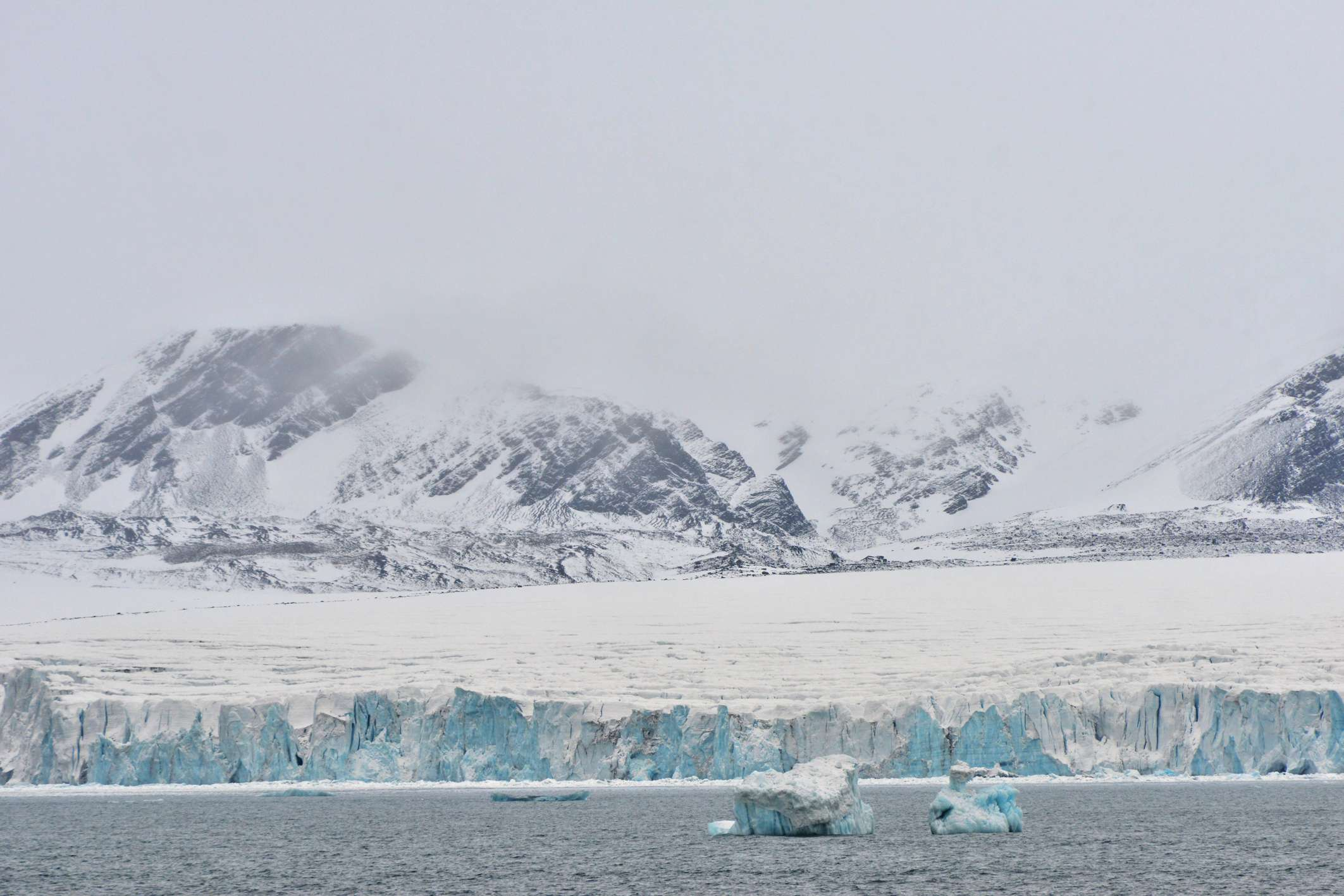
The calving end of Inostrantsev Glacier at Inostrantsev Fjord, Novaya Zemlya

The principal mountainous regions where fjords have formed are in the higher middle latitudes and the high latitudes reaching to 80°N (Svalbard, Greenland), where, during the glacial period, many valley glaciers descended to the then-lower sea level. The fjords develop best in mountain ranges against which the prevailing westerly marine winds are orographically lifted over the mountainous regions, resulting in abundant snowfall to feed the glaciers. Hence coasts having the most pronounced fjords include the west coast of Norway, the west coast of North America from Puget Sound to Alaska, the southwest coast of New Zealand, and the west and to south-western coasts of South America, chiefly in Chile.

=== Principal fjord regions ===
- West coast of Europe
  - Faroe Islands
  - Westfjords of Iceland
  - Eastern Region of Iceland
  - West Highlands of Scotland
  - Norway, the whole coast including Svalbard
  - Kola Peninsula in Russia
- West coast of New Zealand
  - Fiordland, in the southwest of the South Island
- Northwest coast of North America
  - Coast of Alaska, United States: Lynn Canal, Glacier Bay, etc.
  - British Columbia Coast, Canada: from the Alaskan Border along the Portland Canal to Indian Arm; Kingcome Inlet is a typical West Coast fjord.
  - Hood Canal in Washington, United States and various of the arms of Puget Sound
- Northeast coast of North America
  - Labrador: Saglek Fjord, Nachvak Fjord, Hebron Fjord
  - The east coast of Ungava Bay.
  - Baffin Island
  - Ellesmere Island
  - Greenland: Kangerlussuaq, Ilulissat Icefjord, Scoresby Sund, Disko Island
- Southwest coast of South America
  - Fjords and channels of Chile
  - Isla de los Estados, Argentina

=== Other glaciated or formerly glaciated regions ===
Other regions have fjords, but many of these are less pronounced due to more limited exposure to westerly winds and less pronounced relief. Areas include:

- Europe
  - Ireland
    - Lough Swilly
    - Carlingford Lough
    - Killary Harbour
  - Russia (see also List of fjords of Russia)
    - Chukchi Peninsula
    - Kola Peninsula
  - Scotland (where they are called firths, the Scots language cognate of fjord; lochs or sea lochs). Notable examples are:
    - Loch Long
    - Loch Fyne, Scotland's longest fjord at 65 km
    - Loch Etive
  - Sweden
    - Gullmarsfjorden, in Bohuslän, Sweden
  - Wales
    - Mawddach Estuary, a fjord in-filled by glacial deposits.
- North America
  - Canada:
    - the west and south coasts of Newfoundland, particularly:
      - Facheux Bay
      - Bonne Bay in Gros Morne National Park
      - Aviron Bay
      - La Hune Bay
      - Bay de Vieux
      - White Bear Bay
      - Baie d'Espoir
      - La Poile Bay
      - Bay Le Moine
    - the Canadian Arctic Archipelago
    - Quebec, Saguenay Fjord
  - United States:
    - Somes Sound, Acadia National Park, Maine
    - Hudson River
      - most clearly seen at The Palisades
    - Puget Sound
- South America
  - Argentina:
    - Isla de los Estados
- Arctic
  - Arctic islands
    - Novaya Zemlya
    - Severnaya Zemlya
- Antarctica
  - South Georgia (UK)
  - Kerguelen Islands (France)
  - particularly the Antarctic Peninsula
- Sub-Antarctic islands

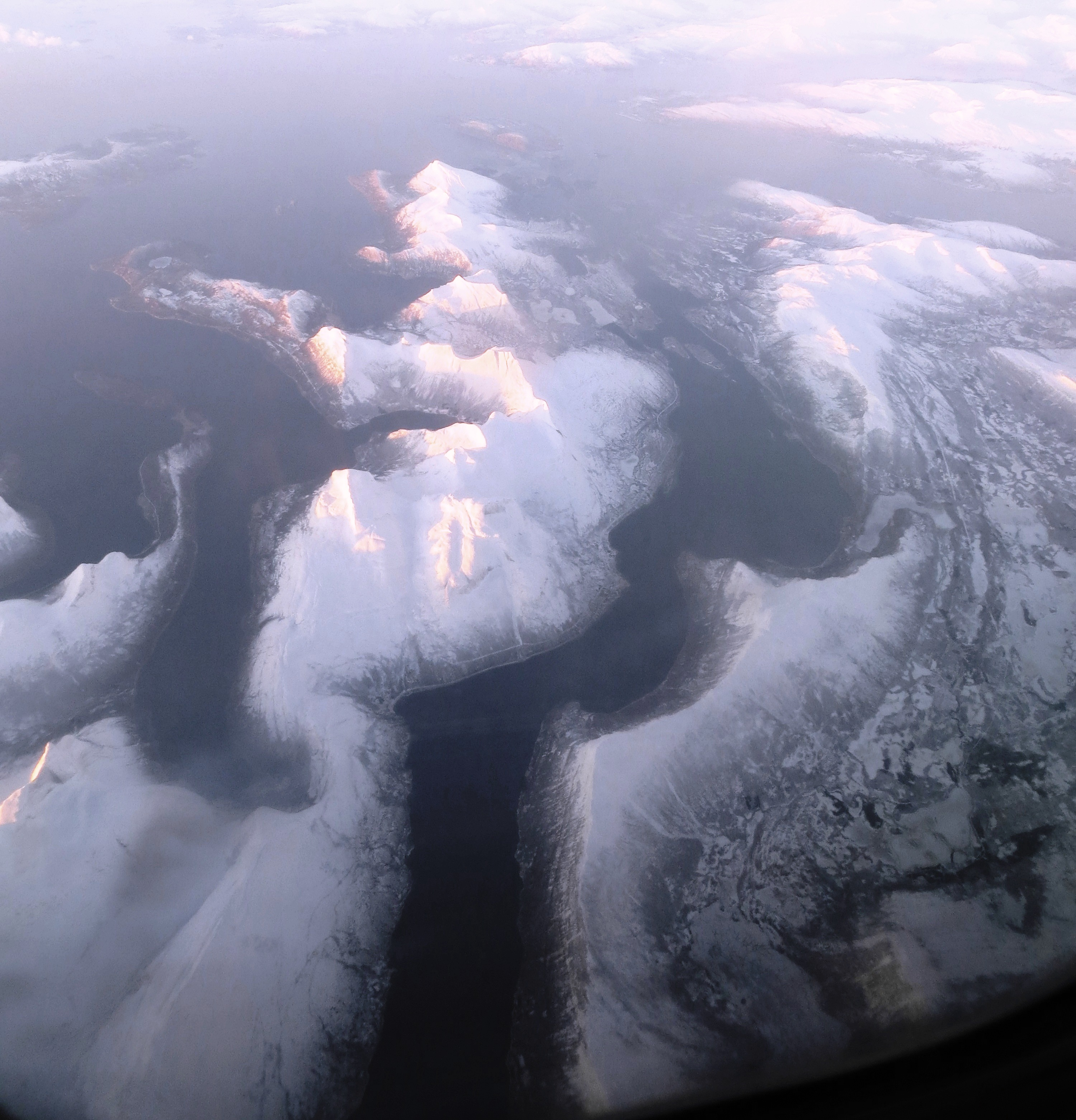
Snow-covered mountains stand out in contrast to the dark water Efjorden fjord and Stefjorden, Tysfjorden and Ofotfjorden fjords in the distance.

=== Extreme fjords ===
The longest fjords in the world are:

1. Nansen Sound/Greely Fiord/Tanquary Fiord in Canada—420 km (261 mi)
2. Chatham Strait/Lynn Canal in United States—403 km (250 mi)
3. Scoresby Sund in Greenland—382 km (237 mi)
4. Concepción Channel-Puerto Simpson in Chile—245 km (152 mi)
5. Sognefjord in Norway—226 km (140 mi)
6. Independence Fjord in Greenland—200 km (124 mi)
7. Hardangerfjord in Norway—180 km (112 mi)
8. Trondheimsfjord in Norway—130 km (81 mi)
9. Matochkin Shar, Novaya Zemlya, Russia—125 km (78 mi) (a strait with a fjord structure)

Deep fjords include:

1. Skelton Inlet in Antarctica—1,933 m (6,342 ft)
2. Sognefjord in Norway—1,308 m (4,291 ft) (the mountains then rise to up to 1,500 m (4,921 ft) and more, Hurrungane reaches 2,400 m (7,874 ft))
3. Messier Channel in Tortel, Chile—1,358 m (4,455 ft)
4. Baker Channel in Tortel, Chile—1,251 m (4,104 ft)

=== Heritage fjords ===
Norway has several heritage fjords, including UNESCO World Heritage Sites and other notable fjords, these will require visiting ships to be low-emission by 2026 and zero-emission by 2032

- Geirangerfjord
- Nærøyfjord
- Hardangerfjord
- Trollfjord
- Urnes Stave Church
- Hjørundfjord

== See also ==
- Firth
- Förden and East Jutland Fjorde
- Fjard
- Ria
