= Vosso =

River in Vestland, Norway

Vosso Bolstadelvi
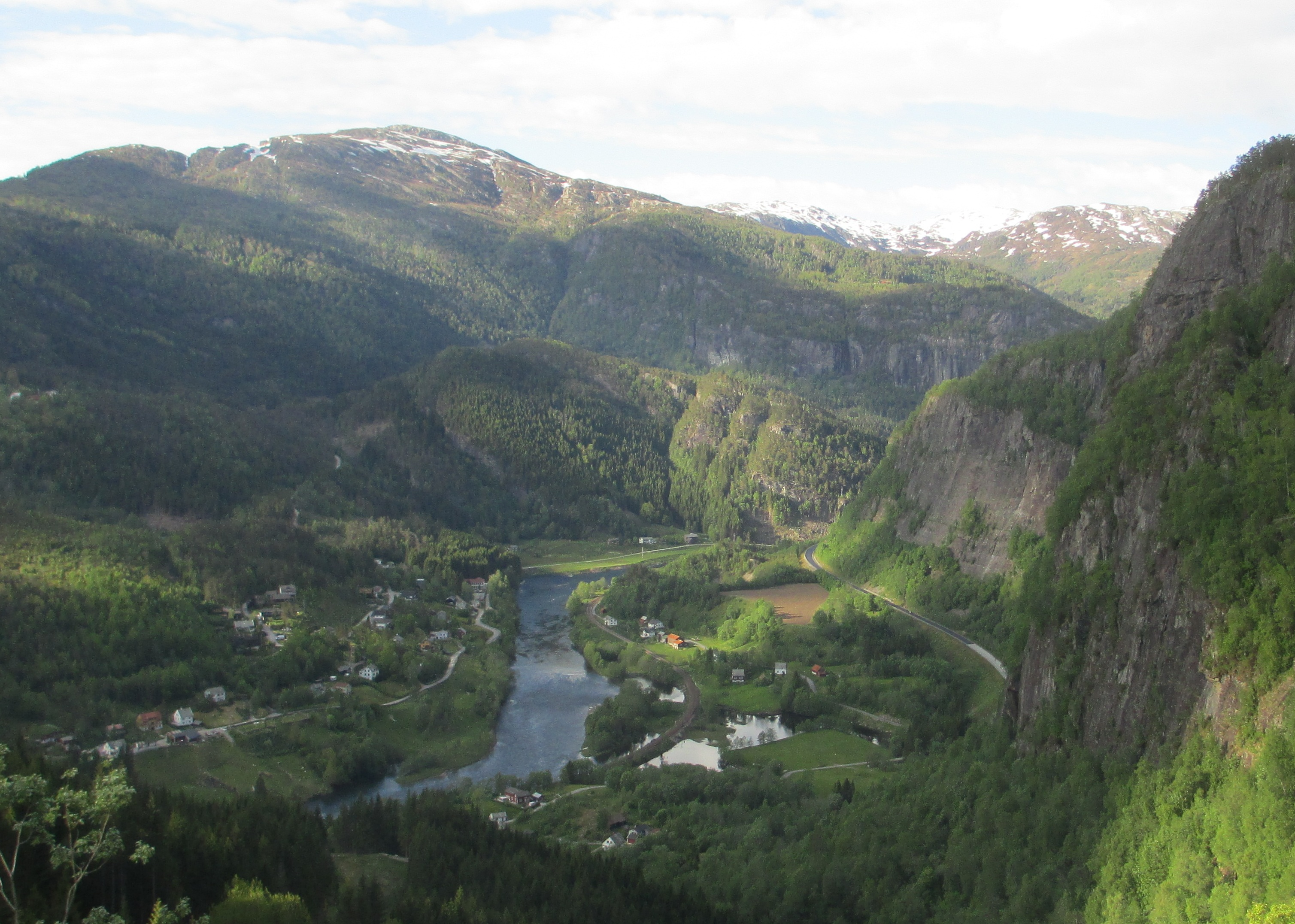
- The Vosso river valley, just east of its estuary at Bolstadøyri, with Oslo-Bergen railway line and main road

Location
- Country: Norway
- County: Vestland
- Municipalities: Voss Municipality

Physical characteristics
- Source: Confluence of Strandaelvi and Raundalselvi rivers
  - location: Vossavangen, Voss Municipality
  - coordinates: 60.63075°N 6.43009°E
  - elevation: 48 metres (157 ft)
- Mouth: Bolstadfjorden
  - location: Bolstadøyri, Voss Municipality
  - coordinates: 60.6399741°N 5.9510503°E
  - elevation: 0 metres (0 ft)
- Length: 30 km (19 mi)
- Basin size: 1,496.5 km^{2} (577.8 sq mi)

Vosso is a river in Voss Municipality in Vestland county, Norway. The river starts at Tvildemoen in Vossavangen, where the two rivers Strandaelvi and Raundalselvi meet. The 30-kilometre (19 mi) long river continues through the lakes Vangsvatnet and Evangervatnet before ending in the Bolstadfjorden at the village of Bolstadøyri. Between the lake Evangervatnet and the Bolstadfjorden the river is also called Bolstadelvi. The river has a drainage basin of 1,496.5 square kilometres (577.8 sq mi). In 1986 the river was protected from water power development through "Verneplan III for vassdrag".

== See also ==
- List of rivers in Norway
