= Bolstadøyri =

Village in Voss Municipality, Norway

- Village
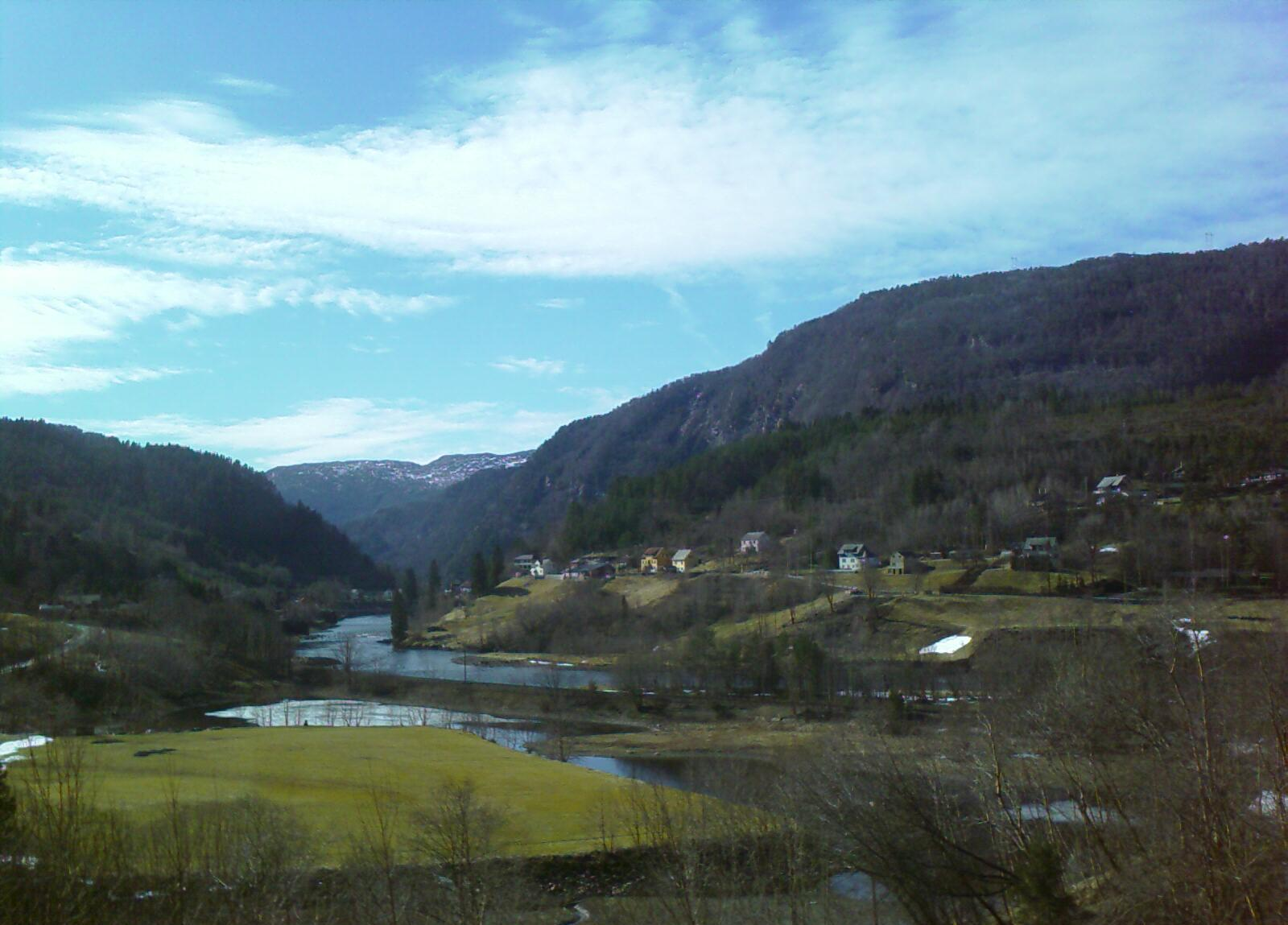
- View of the village
- Interactive map of Bolstadøyri
- Coordinates: 60.63887°N 5.95818°E
- Country: Norway
- Region: Western Norway
- County: Vestland
- District: Voss
- Municipality: Voss Municipality
- Elevation: 9 m (30 ft)
- Time zone: UTC+01:00 (CET)
  - Summer (DST): UTC+02:00 (CEST)
- Post Code: 5723 Bolstadøyri

Bolstadøyri is a village in Voss Municipality in Vestland county, Norway. The village lies at the mouth of the river Bolstadelvi, where it meets the Bolstadfjorden. The village lies about 10 kilometres (6.2 mi) west of the village of Evanger and about 10 kilometres (6.2 mi) northeast of the village of Dale in the neighboring Vaksdal Municipality.

The village has a railway station, Bolstadøyri Station, which is part of the Bergensbanen railway line and is also served by the Bergen Commuter Rail. The European route E16 highway runs through the village also.
