= Bolstadfjorden =

Fjord in Vestland, Norway

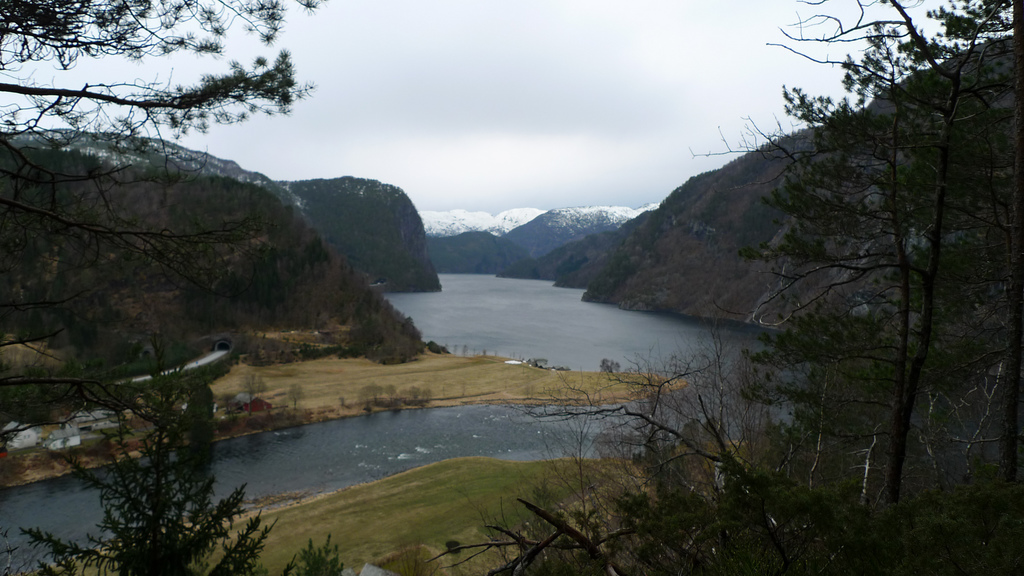
- View of the fjord
- Interactive map of Bolstadfjorden
- Location: Vestland county, Norway
- Coordinates: 60.63182°N 5.89196°E
- Type: Fjord
- Basin countries: Norway
- Max. length: 12 kilometres (7.5 mi)
- Surface area: 7.1 square kilometres (2.7 sq mi)
- Max. depth: 160 metres (520 ft)

Bolstadfjorden is a 12 km (7.5 mi) long fjord in Vestland county, Norway. The Bolstadfjorden is located in Vaksdal Municipality and Voss Municipality. It is a branch of the Veafjorden and a continuation of Vikafjorden. Vikafjorden meets Bolstadstraumen at Straume and the mouth of Bolstadfjorden. It is the innermost point of the fjord system surrounding the city of Bergen.

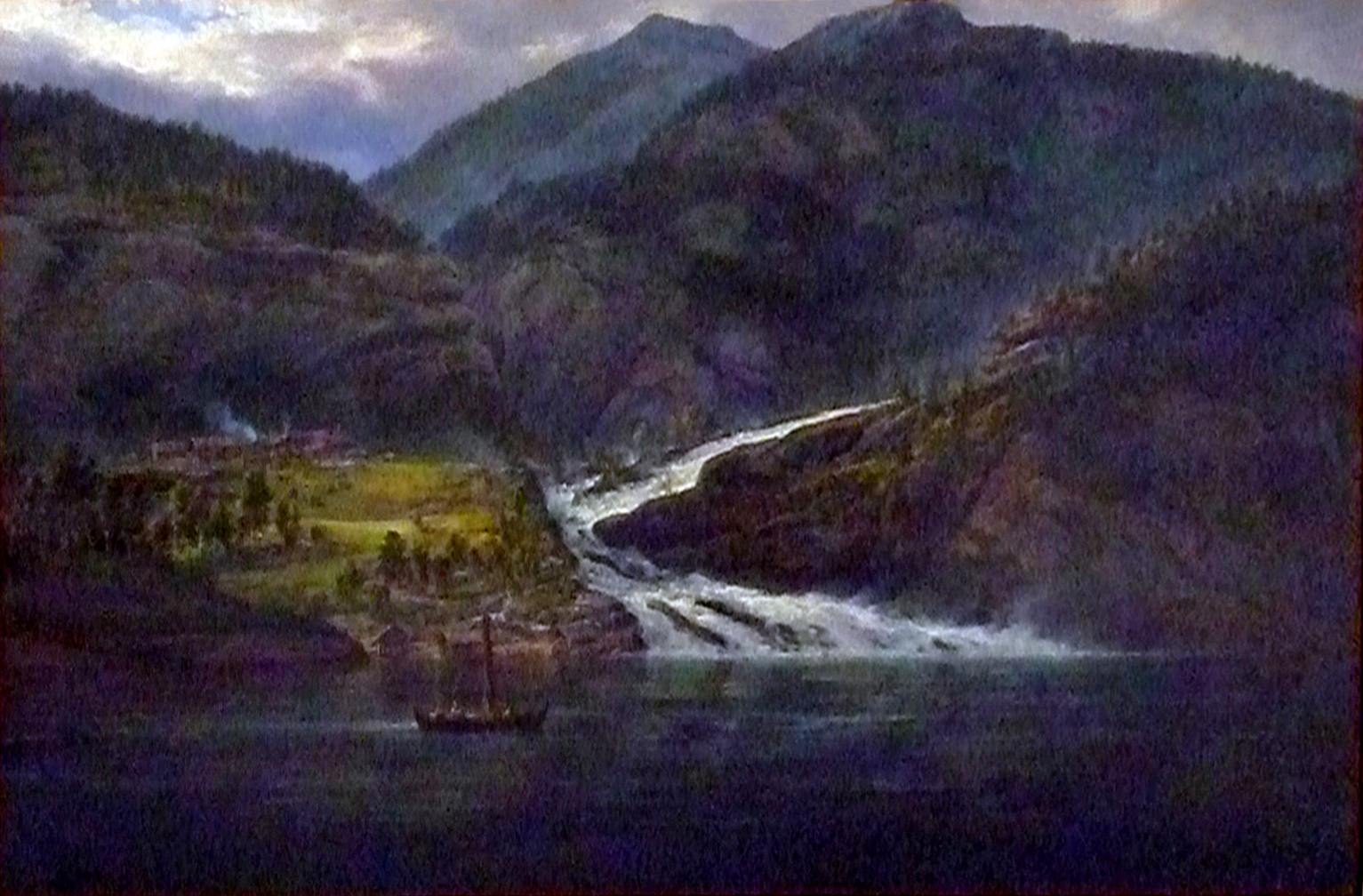
J.C. Dahl: View of Tysse waterfall at Bolstadfjord (oil on canvas, 1836)

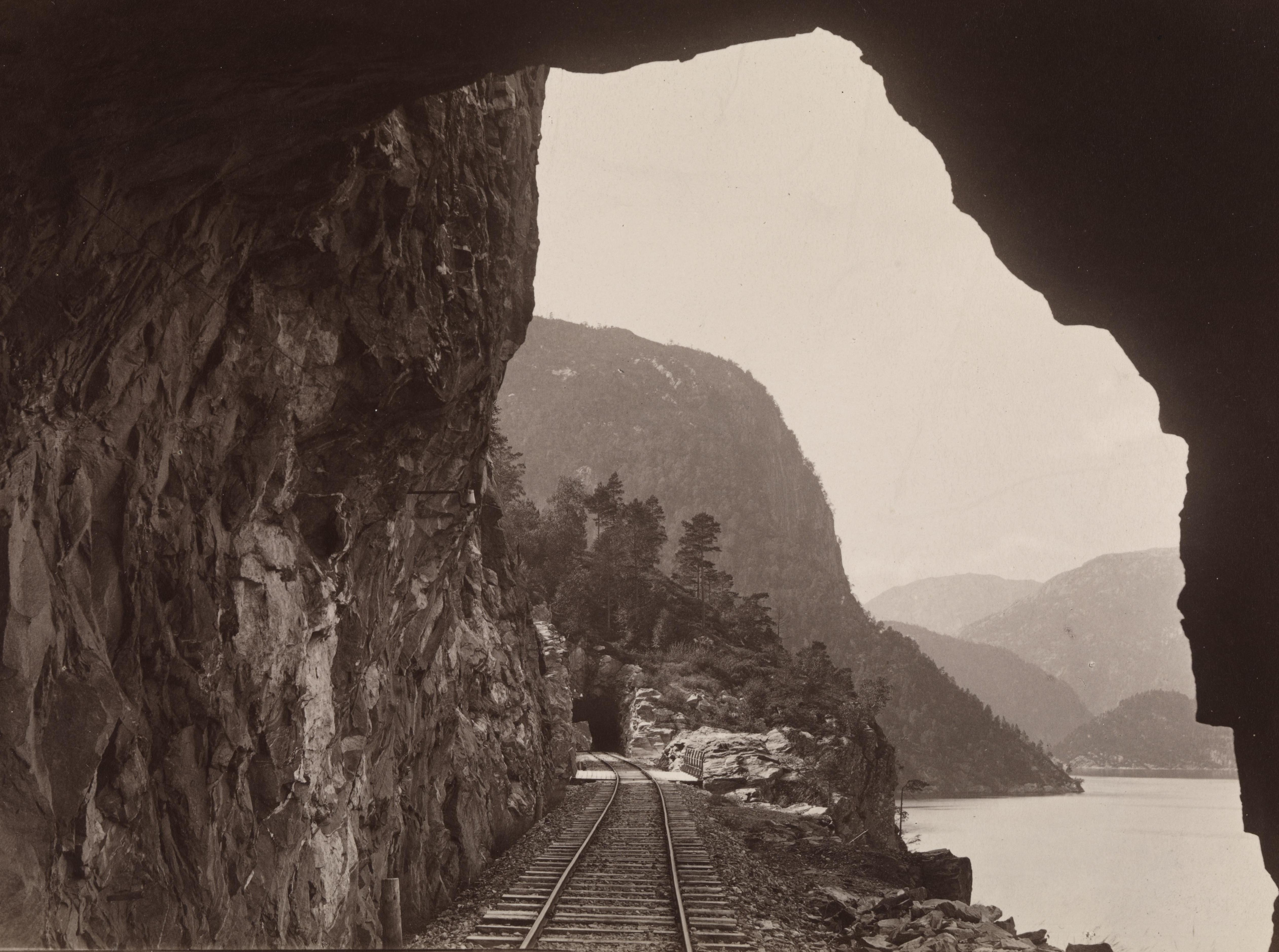
Voss Line along Bolstadfjorden, around 1890, was abandoned in 1987. Credit: Axel Lindahl

Bolstadfjorden is 160 m (520 ft) deep with a threshold of only 1.5 metres (4 ft 11 in) which creates a strong tidal current. Bolstadfjorden has a surface area of 7.1 km^{2} (2.7 sq mi). There is a threshold at 35 metres (115 ft) creating two basins, the outer 4.6 km^{2} (1.8 sq mi). The Vosso River flows into the Bolstadfjorden and brings freshwater from a 1,500 km^{2} (580 sq mi) catchment area. Freshwater inflow peaks in May and June. Freshwater or brackish water on the surface obstructs circulation of the heavier saltwater leaving the saltwater in the deeper part deprived of oxygen. Measurements in April and August 2006 indicated that there was no oxygen at 50 metres (160 ft) or deeper. In April, the layer of brackish water was about 5 metres (16 ft) deep, while in August the brackish water was 20 meters (66 ft) deep.

The main road from Bergen-Voss-Oslo (European route E16) runs along the south shores of the fjord. The Voss Line originally ran along the south shore, partly through 10 short tunnels. When the Bergen Line in 1987 was shifted deeper into the bedrock (through the 8-kilometre (5.0 mi) long Trollkona tunnel), the E16 highway partly took over abandoned tunnels and rail tracks along Bolstadfjorden.

== See also ==
- List of Norwegian fjords
