= NSB Class 88 =

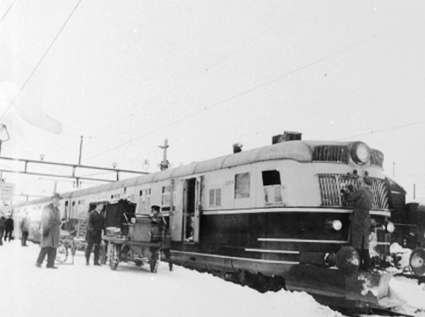
- NSB Class 88
- In service: 1945–1970
- Manufacturer: Strømmen
- Constructed: 1938–1946, 1956–1958
- Number built: 6
- Number scrapped: 6
- Formation: 3 cars
- Fleet numbers: 88.01–13; 88.61–63
- Capacity: 145
- Operators: Norwegian State Railways

Specifications
- Car length: 22,275 mm (73 ft 1.0 in)
- Maximum speed: 120 km/h (75 mph)
- Weight: 42.5 t (42 long tons; 47 short tons) (motor car)
- Prime mover(s): Maybach
- Power output: 900 kW (1,200 hp)
- Transmission: Diesel-hydraulic
- Track gauge: 1,435 mm (4 ft 8 1/2 in)

NSB Class 88 was a class of six three-car diesel-hydraulic multiple units built by Strømmens Værksted for the Norwegian State Railways. Derived from the German DRG Class SVT 877, the trains were the diesel counterpart of Class 66. The trains were built as express trains on the Bergen Line and the Dovre Line, serving the routes from Oslo to Bergen and Trondheim. The first four units were delivered in 1945 and 1946, but mechanical failures caused them to highly unreliable until 1950. Two more units were delivered in 1958. Retirement started in 1963 and from 1965 the trains were moved to the Røros Line. They left regular service from 1970 and were chopped three years later.

Each motor car had one powered bogie which was powered by a Maybach V12 prime mover rated at 900 kilowatts (1,200 hp), allowing the trains to each 120 km/h (75 mph) via a Voith hydraulic transmission. The trains were 67.57 meters (221 ft 8 in) long overall, weighing 113 tonnes (111 long tons; 125 short tons). They had space for 145 passengers, and included a saloon, kitchen and cargo room.

== History ==
Deutsche Reichsbahn introduced its DRG Class SVT 877 Hamburg Flyer in 1931. It served as inspiration for other countries to manufacture similar diesel multiple units for express trains. NSB borrowed a derived unit from the Danish State Railways in 1938 and tested it on the Bergen Line, the Dovre Line and the Sørlandet Line. It proved able to run to Trondheim in seven hours and achieved an average speed on 79 km/h (49 mph).

Happy with the trials, NSB signed an agreement with Strømmens Værksted to manufacture four three-car units with a similar design. The order was placed in 1938. The following year NSB placed an order for four Class 66 units. These had similar specifications and design as Class 88, but were equipped with electric traction. They were intended for use on the electrified or soon-to-be electrified Sørlandet Line and Østfold Line.

Production was postponed with the break-out of the Second World War. There are unconfirmed claims that two partially completed trains were stored in the closed-off tunnel at Bøn for the duration of the war, to avoid German forces from accessing them. The first trial run of a motor unit took place from Oslo to Sarpsborg on 8 March 1945. The first complete three-car unit was tested from Strømmen to Kongsvinger on 12 July.

Trial revenue services commenced in February 1946 on the Bergen Line from Oslo to Geilo. After a month there were issues with the pinions, causing them to have to be replaced. The unit continued on the Geilo service until September. By then the roller bearings in the prime mover's big ends were sufficiently weakened that they were causing engines to malfunction. Low standards caused by wartime manufacturing combined with dust and rust in the engines through four years of storage required a major clean-up of the prime movers before they could be returned to service. The prime movers were manufactured in 1939 and their big ends had to be replaced with sleeve bearings to improve reliability.

Operations resumed in November 1946 on the Oslo–Trondheim route on the Dovre Line. By May 1947 fractures in the axles and motors caused the trains to again be taken out of service. This time a major rebuilding of the motors was needed, carried out in Germany. It took two years before the trains were fit for service. The trains were pulled for service in January 1950, this time because of defect bearings in the power transmission. While the trains were placed on hold, NSB attempted to install new Paxman prime movers. These were less powerful, rated at 375 kilowatts (503 hp), and instead renovated Maybach engines were installed.

The trains entered service on the day express services to both Trondheim and Bergen later that year, with NSB branding the services as Dovreekspressen and Bergensekspressen, respectively. They proved popular with the public, allowing for faster travel times from the capital to Norway's second and third largest cities. Due to running through scenic mountainous areas, the services were popular with tourists. However, the trains had poor driving properties, especially at higher speeds and through curves. This was partially evaded through the installation of hydraulic suspension in the bogies.

The four sets allowed for daily services in both directions to Trondheim, but only one direction each day to Bergen. NSB therefore decided in 1956 to order two more units, allowing for daily services also on the Bergen Line. NSB initially intended to order the new units with reversible seating and the kitchen in the center car, but chose to retain the former layout in able to retain a universally interchangeable fleet to avoid complicating the booking process. However, the new units were delivered with doors on both sides of the train, compensated through and overall longer length and a tighter seat pitch. The two units were delivered in 1958 and first ran on 13 May. They were handed over to NSB on 31 May and 15 June, respectively.

The first retirement took place on 15 December 1963. Unit 88.04 experienced a brake failure and was parked at Bryn Station to be shunted to Loenga. The brakes failed and it ran to Loenga by itself, crashing into two flat cars. The Bergen Line switched to electric traction in December 1964. Class 88 was therefore no longer economical on the line and NSB close to reallocate all their units to the Dovre Line. Maintenance was on the rise, and the oldest trains were converted to spare part trains.

Service on the Dovre Line lasted until early 1965. They were then moved to the Røros Line, where they also ran on the Oslo–Trondheim service. The Røros Line is less steep than the Bergen- and Dovre Lines, allowing the trains to operate in a four-car configuration with two center cars. The units remained unstable and frequently broke down during operations and were in a steady need for maintenance. The last day with regular service with Class 88 was on 31 October 1970. The following day the Dovre Line opened with electric traction, and the Di 3 diesel locomotives used there were transferred to the Røros Line.

The units continued to be used exceptionally in special and charter trains. Proposals were made to reuse them as carriages, but this would require costly rebuilding. Other proposals were to convert them to fast reaction trains to respond to derailments and accidents, use them as charter trains or selling them abroad. The cost of rebuilding was prohibitive to any of these plans being carried out. Although there was a certain desire to preserve a unit, the Norwegian Railway Museum lacked space and the Norwegian Railway Club lacked capacity to maintain a copy. All the trains were therefore scrapped in 1973.

== Specifications ==
Class 88 was a three-car diesel-hydraulic standard gauge multiple unit. Each consisted of two powered motor cars with a driver's cab and an un-powered center car. The motor cars were initially designated Bmdo Class 1, but were shortly afterwards classified as Cmdo Class 8. The motor cars were numbered 18282–89 and the center cars 18951–54. They were reclassified and renumbered in 1956; the motor cars became Bmdo 88, numbered 88.02–09, the motor cars with kitchen classified as BEmdo 88 and the center cars as Bo3e. The center cars retained their old numbers. The first series of trains were classified as the a-series, the second as the b-series. The latter were delivered with the numbers 88.10–13 and the center cars as 18956–57. All the center cars took the new numbers 88.61–66 in 1970.

The train was powered with two Maybach V12 diesel prime mover, providing a combined power output of 900 kilowatts (1,200 hp) at 1400 revolutions per minute. The motors weighed 2,800 kilograms (6,200 lb) and powered each their Voith three-stage hydraulic gear shift. Each motor car had its forward bogie powered by their transmission. The trains had a classified maximum speed of 120 kilometres per hour (75 mph), although they regularly could exceed these speeds in revenue service. The trains had a fuel tank measuring 2,600 liters (570 imp gal; 690 U.S. gal), restricting it to be filled only in Oslo. Each engine and had a fuel consumption of 0.75 liters/kilometer.

The body was made of duraluminum, giving a train weight of 113 tonnes (111 long tons; 125 short tons). Each end car was powered; these had a weight of 42.5 tonnes (42 long tons; 47 short tons), while the center car weighed 28 tonnes (28 long tons; 31 short tons). The train's overall length was 67.57 meters (221 ft 8 in), with the end cars 21.80 meters (71 ft 6 in) long and the center car 21.25 meters (69 ft 9 in), excluding buffers. The trains were painted in a special blue and orange scheme which no other Norwegian trains except Class 66 had. The wheel diameter was 97 centimetres (38 in) a

The interior had total seating for 145 passengers. The center car had places for 70 passengers, divided between two compartments. The one motor car featured a kitchen, while the other had a cargo room. One car also featured a saloon with fifteen individual seats. Overall the seating standards were above the norm for the period. They were the first Norwegian trains with a flush toilet. The train had a water tank with capacity for 2,100 litres (460 imp gal; 550 US gal). All three cars had an oil furnace, which drew oil from the same fuel tanks as the prime mover in each motor car.
