= Night trains of Norway =

Overnight sleeping car services

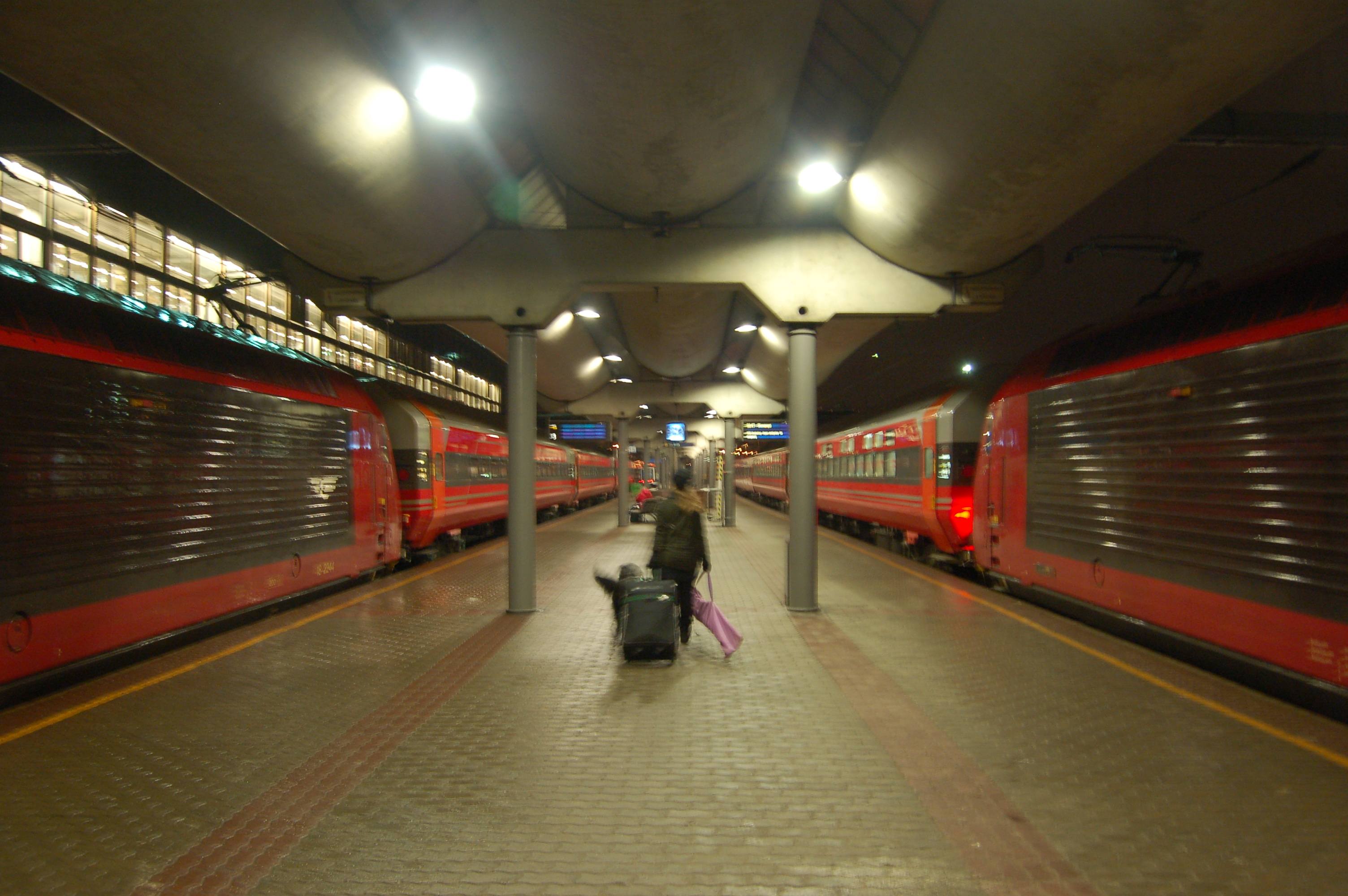
Night trains at Oslo Central Station waiting for departure to Bergen and Stavanger

Night trains of Norway (Norwegian: Nattog) are over-night sleeping car services provided by three different operators on four routes across Norway. There is an additional night train that runs mostly through Sweden from Stockholm to Narvik.

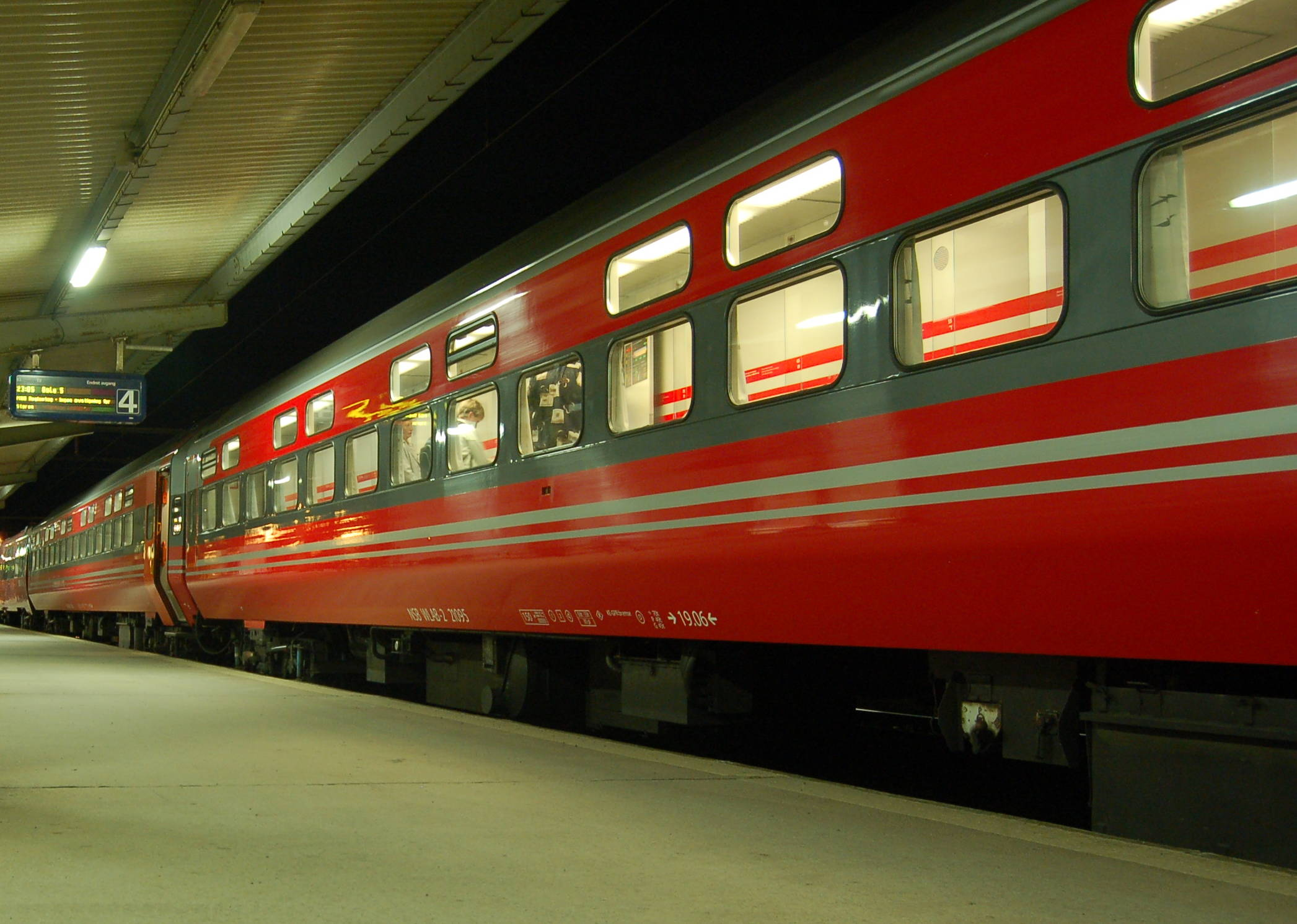
WLAB-2 cars awaiting departure from Trondheim Central Station.

== Current service ==
The 2024 timetables for trains within Norway show there is one night train with sleeper carriages in each direction each day except Saturday between:

- Oslo and Bergen on the Bergen Line, provided by Vy Tog.
- Oslo and Stavanger on the Sørland Line, provided by Go-Ahead Norge.
- Oslo and Trondheim on the Dovre Line, provided by SJ Norge.
- Trondheim and Bodø on the Nordland Line, provided by SJ Norge.

== Current rolling stock ==
A night train usually consists of 5 to 7 coaches:

- 2-3 WLAB-2 (sleeping coach)
- FR7 (bistro)
- 2-3 x B7-4 (2nd class sitting coaches)

All sleeper services use the WLAB-2 carriages. These carriages were built by Strømmens and introduced in 1986, there are 20 in service. Each carriage is 27 m (89 ft) long and has 15 compartments, one of which is fitted for disabled access, available for single or double occupancy, the bunks being one above the other, toilets are situated at the ends of the carriage. The carriages had a mid-life upgrade in 2007.

El 18 locomotives are used on the Bergen, Dovre and Sørland Lines, while the service on the Nordland Line is provided using Di 4 engines.

== Future rolling stock ==
In 2023, Norske Tog placed an order of 17 new FLIRT Nordic Express trainsets from Stadler, with an option of up to 100 in total. New trainsets are expected to enter revenue service in 2028 on Bergen Line, as older rolling stocks reach their lifespan. Trainsets for other lines will also be replaced gradually. Diesel-electric bimode trainsets are ordered for Nordland Line, while the rest are fully electric.

== Narvik night train ==
A sleeper train runs from Stockholm Central to Kiruna and Narvik in Norway. In 2024 these passenger services are operated by Vy Tåg, a subsidiary of the former Norwegian State Railways which won the operating contract, but SJ, a state-owned passenger train operator in Sweden, has won back the contract from 15 December 2024 onwards.

The trains have 1st class 1 & 2 berth sleepers with private toilet & shower, 2nd class 3 bed sleepers with washbasin, 6-berth couchettes, ordinary seats, cafe car.

The first sleeper train on this line was introduced in October 1917 when a sleeper coach was attached to a mixed traffic train.

== History ==
Three sleeping cars were first introduced in 1884 on the Røros Line, the coaches were categorised as Bo, 2nd class bogie coaches, they had full length clerestory roofs.

The Kongsvinger Line had its first two sleeping cars from 1891, these carriages categorised ABo, composite 1st and 2nd class bogie coaches, were used for services to Stockholm.

By 1914 over-night trains with sleeping coaches were running between Oslo (it was called Kristiania at the time) and Trondheim, Skien and Bergen within Norway and to Stockholm and Copenhagen.

The 1939 Cook's Continental timetables show sleeper services to Trondheim, Åndalsnes, Kristiansand and Bergen within Norway and to Stockholm, Copenhagen, Malmö and Hamburg.

The first steel-bodied sleeping cars were introduced in 1939 (by which time there were 90 wooden-bodied sleeping cars of six different types, of which 19 had been rebuilds of existing coaches) a further three were followed in 1940–1941 when the war interrupted. In 1951 there were 15 more provided and between 1956 and 1965 a further 29, most of which were still running in 1995, several having been rebuilt.

Between 9 June 1953 and 26 May 1962 a sleeper service was provided to Oslo when the international Compagnie Internationale des Wagons-Lits (CIWL) extended one of the carriages of the Nord Express (Paris to Copenhagen train) from Copenhagen, the carriage used the train ferry from Helsingør in Denmark to Helsingborg in Sweden, through Goteborg, crossing the border at Kronsjo and on to Oslo.

== See also ==
- Norwegian railway carriages

== Bibliography ==
- Behrend, George (1959). The History of Wagons-Lits 1875 - 1955. London: Modern Transport Publishing.
- Bradshaw, George (1972) [1914]. Bradshaw's August 1914 continental guide. David & Charles Reprints. ISBN 0 7153 5509 0. OCLC 707182588.
- Cook's continental timetable : a new edition of the August 1939 issue of Cook's continental timetable with enlarged type and introduction by J.H. Price. Newton Abbot: David & Charles. 1987 [1939]. OCLC 988081599.
- Martin, Andrew (2017). Night Trains: The Rise and Fall of the Sleeper. Profile Books. ISBN 978-1-78283-212-6.
- Owen, Roy (1996). Norwegian railways : from Stephenson to high speed. Hitchin: Balholm Press. ISBN 0-9528069-0-8. OCLC 43127416.
