= Dalsenget fire =

1956 tram depot fire in Trondheim, Norway

Coordinates: 63.4152778°N 10.3933669°E

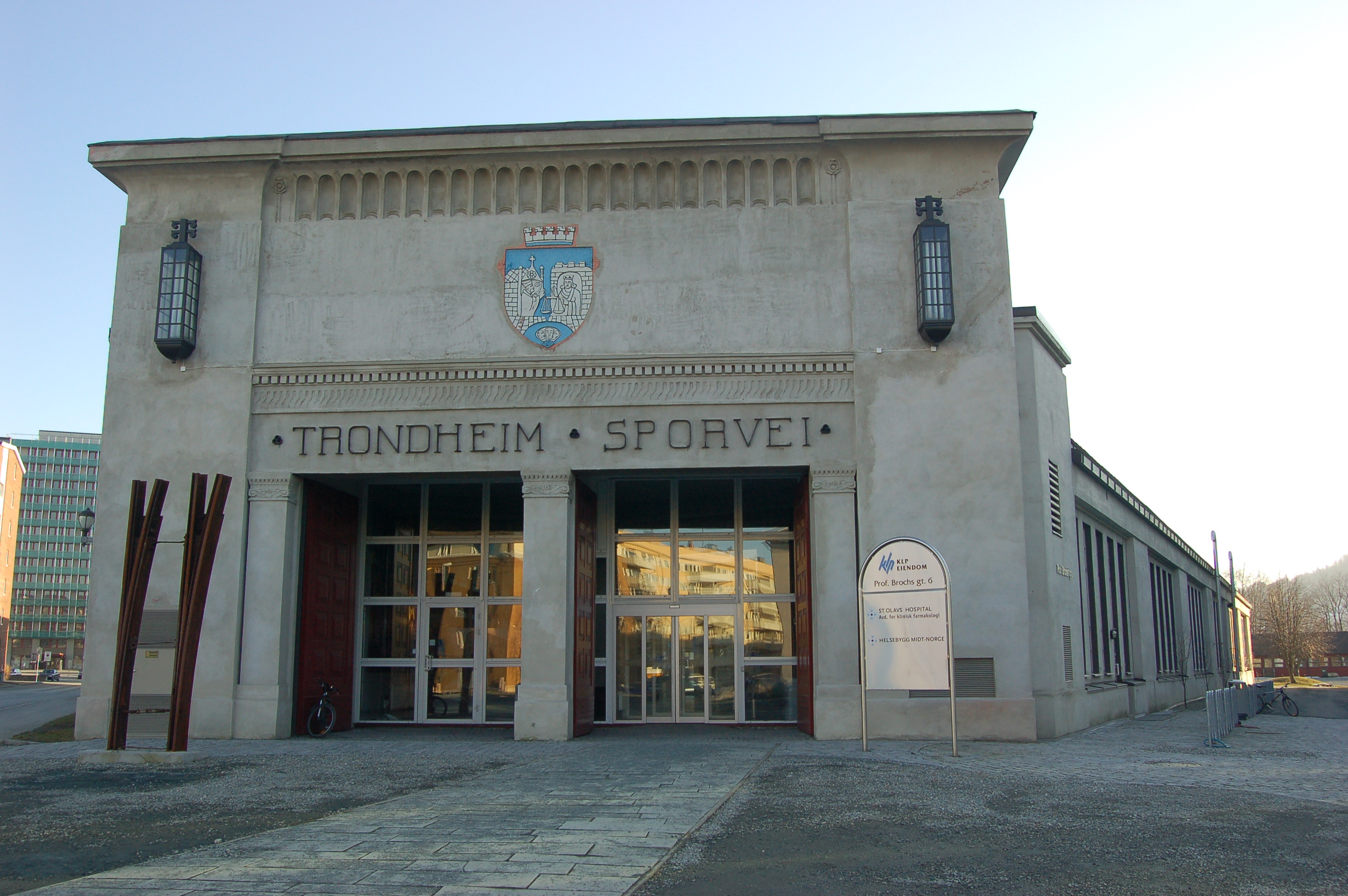
Dalsenget Depot has since been converted to office space

The Dalsenget fire was a disaster where the Dalsenget Depot of Trondheim Sporvei burnt down, destroying almost all of the modern tram fleet. 26 trams, 16 trailers and one working tram were destroyed, and three cleaners lost their lives. It was, at the time, the largest fire in Trondheim, Norway, after World War II.

The fire started at 04:15 on 10 October 1956, and quickly the entire depot was ablaze. The fire department was not alerted until 04:23, and little could be done to save the trams or the depot. One tram and trailer survived from within the fire-proof paint shop. Trondheim Sporvei had never discarded its old trams, that were stored at Voldsminde Depot, and eleven old trams were in service within the day. In addition, eight buses were borrowed from Oslo within the week. Damage was at NOK 9 million, of which 8 million was for the rolling stock.

A proposal to replace the tramway with trolleybus was discarded by the city council. The depot was rebuilt, and 28 new Class 7 trams were ordered, in addition to 15 trailers from Strømmens Værksted and Hønefoss Karosserifabrikk, respectively. The bogies and motors were salvaged, and reused on the new trams.

== The fire ==
During the night of 10 October 1956, two mechanics and eight cleaners were working at depot 2. At 04:03, one of the cleaners noticed smoke, and shouted to the mechanics that they should turn off the overhead current. The current was kept on and the pantographs kept up so it would be easy to get out of the trams in case of a fire. All the workers were in the annex, while the fire had started in the main wing. Two of the trams at the back were ablaze. One of the mechanics ran to turn off the power, while the other went to phone the fire department. Based on the requirements of the insurance policy, the depot was always to be staffed, and in case of a fire trams were to be driven out. At this point in time such actions would still have been possible, but were not done due to the confusion. Both the mechanics and five of the cleaners succeeded in evacuating from the building before a gas tank exploded, killing the last three women in an inferno. The three deceased were Sigrid Dahl (45), Inger Skjærli (41) and Harriet Skoglund (57).

Just as the inferno occurred, an engineer from the Norwegian Institute of Technology passed by. He asked the mechanics if they had contacted the fire department, but he thought they were acting as if in shock, and ran the 200 m (660 ft) home to call the department himself. When he placed the call at 04:23, it was the first message of the fire that reached the fire department. At the same time, the chief mechanic came from his nearby apartment to drive out trams, but it was too late. When the fire department arrived, the main wing's roof was ablaze. Smoke divers were used to try to locate the three people who had not escaped. Half an hour later the whole main wing roof collapsed. The rest of the firemen's efforts were concentrated on rescuing the workshop at the end of the building, which had fire-proof gates. The fire was the largest in Trondheim since World War II.

== Material casualty ==
The Dalsenget Depot was used for the operative stock, while the Voldsminde Depot was used for reserve stock. Of the 46 trams, 26 were located at Dalsenget. This included all the sixteen brand-new Class 6 trams. Nineteen trams not located at Dalsenget were saved. Of the twenty trailers, sixteen were burned, while four were saved. Of these, two were used Belgian trailers that needed to be configured before entering service. A track cleaning tram was also destroyed in the fire, while the one museum and one welding tram both survived.

The building and trams were all insured. Only the roof of the depot was destroyed, and a new roof would have to be built for 1 million kr; because it needed to be a costlier fire-proof solution, the insurance only covered NOK 663.000. In addition, a fire-proof gate would be constructed between the main wing and the annex of the building. The company was paid NOK 8 million in insurance for the lost rolling stock.

== Troubled operations ==
At the other depot, at Voldsminde, the company had a fleet of 19 trams and four trailers. During the night and morning, these were immediately taken into service. Some were not in proper operating condition, having been untouched since 1951, while others had only been there a year. In the course of the day, eleven of the trams were made available for operation. One of the Class 5 bogie trams that was still in regular service had survived because it had overnighted in the other depot. All the ten Class 2 and seven of the Class 3 trams could be put into service in the course of a few days. Behind the fire-proof doors at the paint shop at Dalsenget was a single Class 4 tram with a trailer that had survived the fire.

Trondheim Sporvei contacted Oslo Sporveier and Bergen Sporvei to organize renting buses. Since Trondheim used a different gauge than Oslo and Bergen, it was not possible to borrow any trams. The company did not ask to borrow buses from the other bus companies in town, nor trams from the other tram company, Graakalbanen, who operated trams that ran on part of the track of the city tramway. Eight buses were sent from Oslo, and arrived on 14 October by train. The buses would run in between the remaining trams to create a five-minute headway on all three routes. The buses were introduced on 16 October. Only 10.6 m (35 ft) long and a lot smaller than the trams, the Høka/Leyland buses had seating for 22 or 34

It was not until 14 November that the company was ready to get the two Belgian trailers into service. They needed to be rebuilt, but the company only had a single tram, the Class 4 (nicknamed the Happy Widow), that had enough power to haul the large trailers. All the old trams were smaller than those that had burned up, and they had wooden, instead of leather, seats. With less trams and lower comfort, ridership dropped 22% the following year. To compensate, the ticket price was increased from NOK 0.30 to 0.40 for adults, and from 0.15 to 0.20 for children. The bus operation was not profitable, and suffered a loss of NOK 123,000 until it was terminated on 1 July 1957. The headway had been down to eight minutes due to lack of stock, but by the fall of 1957, the company increased it to seven minutes again.

== New stock ==
Immediately after the fire had occurred, some politicians launched the idea of instead investing in a trolleybus system. Similar replacements had been done in Bergen and Oslo. Director Fredrik Kleven of Trondheim Sporvei calculated that this suggestion would cost NOK 1.5 million more per year, that operation of trams. 40 more people would be needed, because more buses would be needed due to their lower capacity. Also, the centenary would have to be rebuilt, the tracks removed, and trolleybuses had only a 15-year life expectancy compared to the 35 years of a tram. Buses would have to run more frequently, and could clog up the city streets.

Kleven recommended that there be ordered 28 trams and 17 trailers, but this was later reduced by two trailers. Costs could be reduced since the bogies, motors, transformers and compressors from the fire could be salvaged, and reused by the new trams. Final decision would be taken by the city council, since Trondheim Sporvei was a municipal agency. The chief of administration recommended 24 October that only the 8 million from the insurance be used for new stock, but also said that NOK 4 million could be borrowed. On 1 November, the city council voted in favor of the suggestion, giving the tram company's board freedom to strike the deal.

An invitation to a tender was sent to Strømmens Værksted and Hønefoss Karosserifabrikk (Høka) for fifteen chassis and bogies; the bid was won by Strømmen. The remaining ten trailers were offered to Skabo Jernbanevognfabrikk and Høka; the latter had the cheapest deal and won. Delivery started from Strømmen on 27 April 1957.

== See also ==
The Brisbane tramway fire in 1962, by comparison, led to the trams in that city being abandoned.
