= TS Class 3 =

Class of Norwegian trams

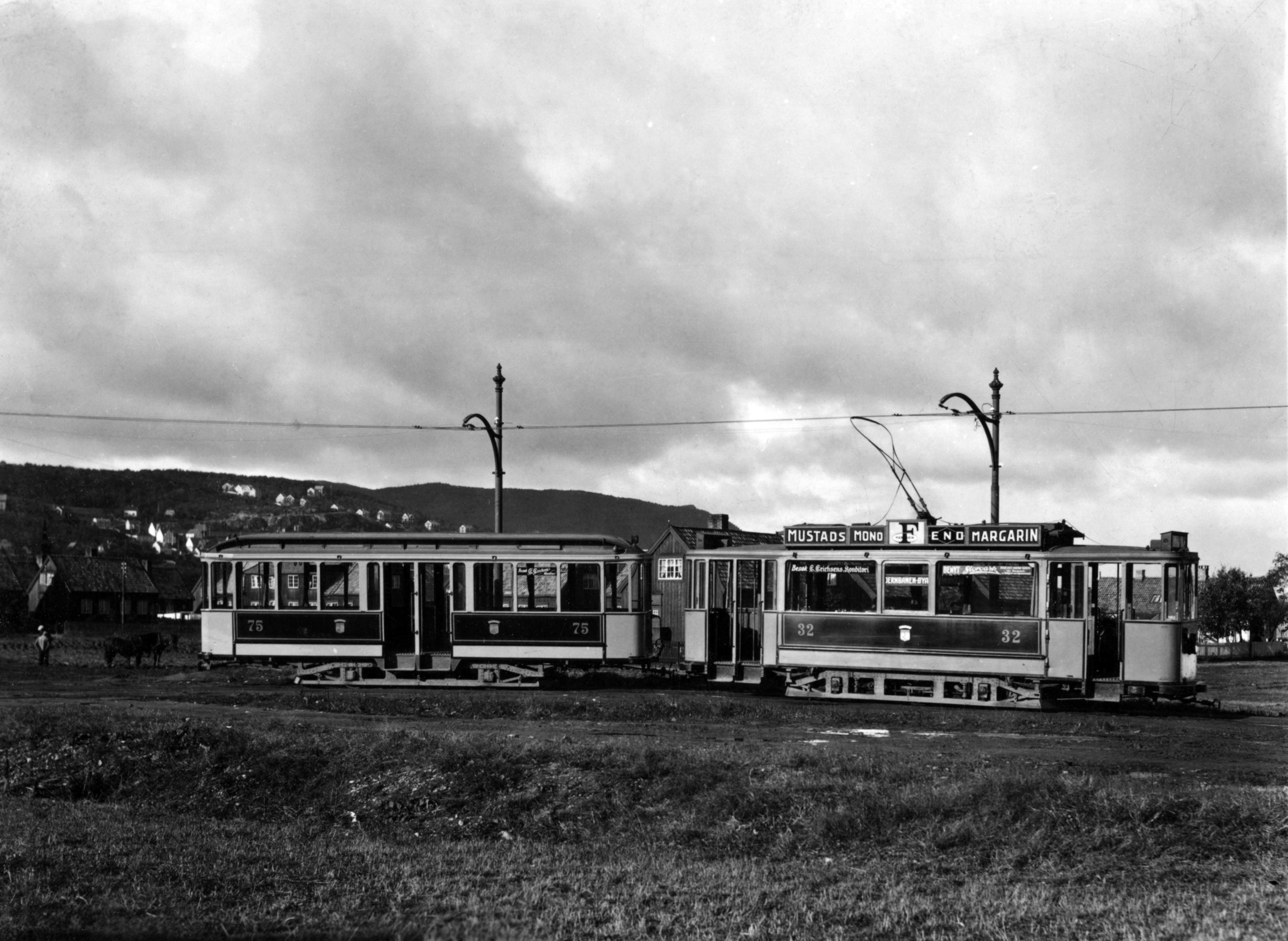
- Manufacturer: HaWa
- Constructed: 1922
- Entered service: December 1922
- Scrapped: 1956–62
- Number built: 10 (trams); 12 (trailers)
- Number preserved: 2 (trams); 1 (trailer)
- Fleet numbers: 13–24 (trams); 64–75 (trailers)
- Capacity: 20 (seated) + 30 (standing)
- Operators: Trondheim Sporvei

Specifications
- Car body construction: Wood
- Car length: 10.0 m (32 ft 10 in)
- Width: 2.0 m (6 ft 7 in)
- Doors: 4
- Weight: 12.5 t (12.3 long tons; 13.8 short tons)
- Prime mover(s): Siemens D58W/9
- Power output: 66 kW (89 hp)
- Electric system(s): 600 V DC
- Current collection: Pantograph
- Track gauge: 1,000 mm (3 ft 3 3/8 in)

TS Class 3 was a series of ten trams built by Hannoversche Waggonfabrik (HaWa) for Trondheim Sporvei. They were delivered in November 1922, and put into service on 4 and 22 December. They remained in service until 1962.

Each of the two Siemens motors had a power of 33 kW (44 hp). They had a single compartment, with outdoor platforms at each end. They made up part of the old 2.0 m (6 ft 7 in) wide trams, with benches along the length of the cars. They remained in service until 1951, but after the Dalsenget fire the following year, ten of the trams were taken back into use until the Class 7 trams were delivered in 1958. Most of the trams were scrapped in 1961 and 1962, though two were rebuilt to working vehicles. Two unit are still preserved at Trondheim Tramway Museum.

Along with the trams, twelve trailers were delivered, numbered 64–75. They remained in service until 10 October 1956, when they burnt down in the Dalsenget fire. One trailer survived the fire, and has been preserved.
