= Norwegian railway carriages =

There are three basic types of Norwegian railway carriage used commonly by NSB / Vy on the Norwegian railway system, the Class 3, Class 5 and Class 7 series. As of 2005, the carriages are hauled by NSB El 18 engines on the main electrified stretches and NSB Di 4 engines on non-electrified lines.

== Coding ==
In general the preceding letter of the carriage type indicates what the carriage is used for. For example:

- A indicates a first class carriage.
- B indicates a second class carriage, this is the most common.
- AB indicates a carriage with both first class and second class seating.
- C indicates some sort of "special" carriage, such as one with a playing room for families with children.
- F indicates a luggage carriage.
- R indicates a restaurant carriage.
- WL indicates a sleeping carriage.

A B5 carriage is thus the "typical" second-class carriage in the Class 5 series, while an A5 carriage is a first class version of it.

== Class 3 series ==
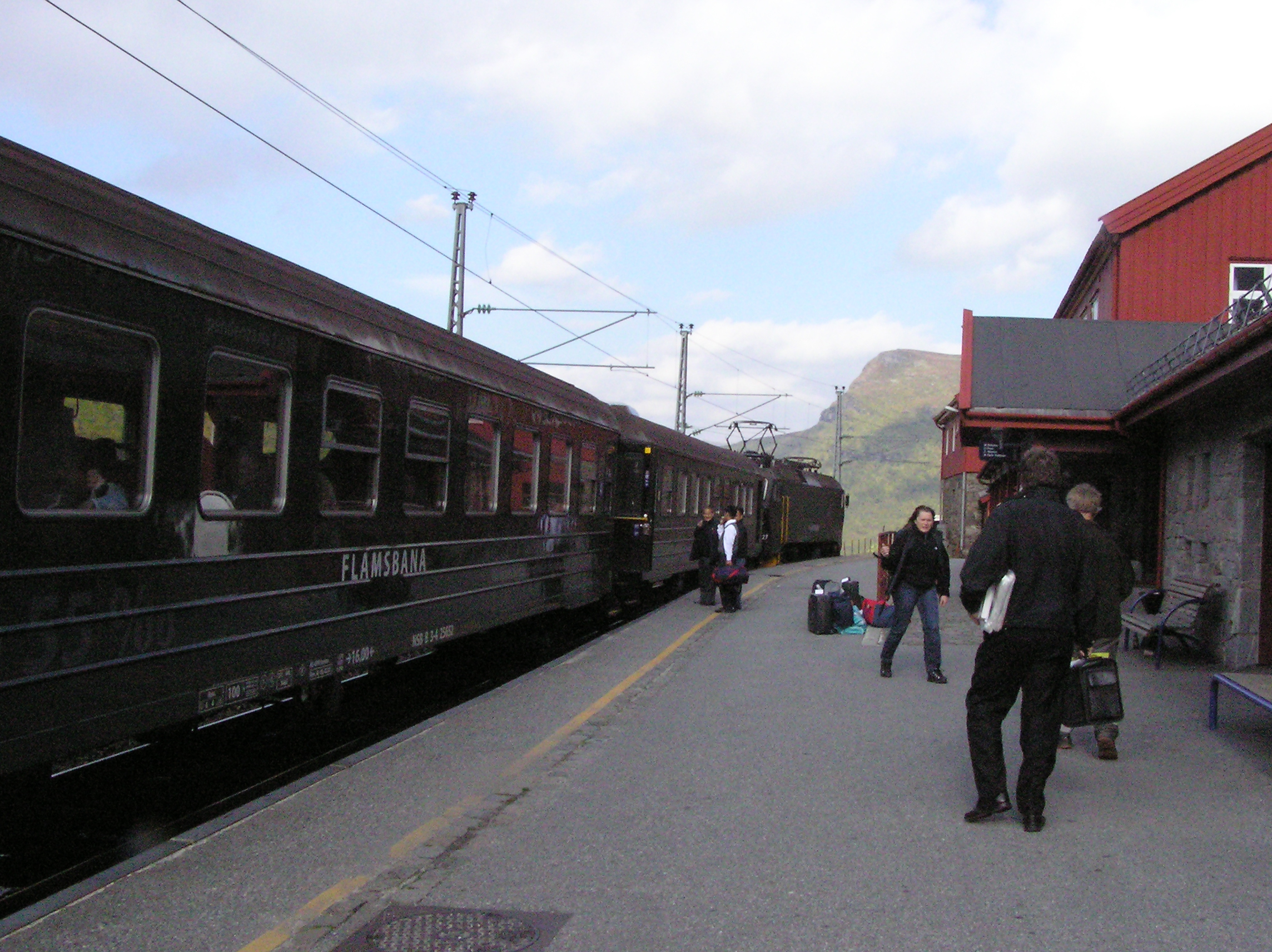
B3 carriages operated by Flåmsbana at Myrdal station

These carriages were built between 1962 and 1974 by Strømmen and are the oldest carriages in common use. They have four recessed slam doors, two in each end. The carriages are partitioned into two saloons, the second class carriage usually has 60 seats.

The WLAB carriages were the older sleeping carriages used on night trains. The cabins had three bunks stacked on top of one another. They were retired from service in January 2006.

The Class 3 carriages were withdrawn from mainline service on 12 December 2014. The remaining B3 carriages are all used on Flåmsbana where they are hauled by NSB El 18 engines. These carriages feature a higher passenger density than what was used on the mainline. A B3 carriage is 23.5 metres long and weighs 36.4 to 42 tonnes.

== Class 5 series ==
These carriages are visually quite similar to the B3 series. The doors are flush with the car sides and sliding rather than conventional slam doors, and on most carriages, all the seating is in one large saloon. The B5s were built by Strømmen between 1977 and 1981. They are slightly larger than the B3, the specifications are 25.3 m long over buffers, 42 tonnes in weight and seating up to 68 passengers. They are used mostly on mid-distance trains to supplement the Class 70 trainsets.

The BF13 and BF14 are versions of the B5 with cabins for families with small children and people with physical disabilities. They also have a small conductor's compartment.

The coaches were upgraded around 2010 and are now used in long-distance trains on following lines:

- Oslo-Bergen
- Oslo-Trondheim
- Trondheim-Bodø

== Class 7 series ==
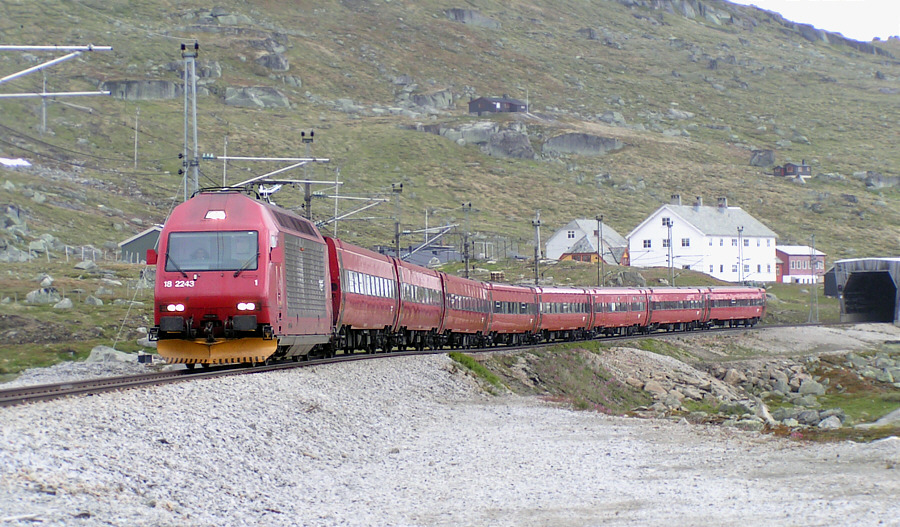
An El. 18 hauling a train of Class 7 carriages at Finse

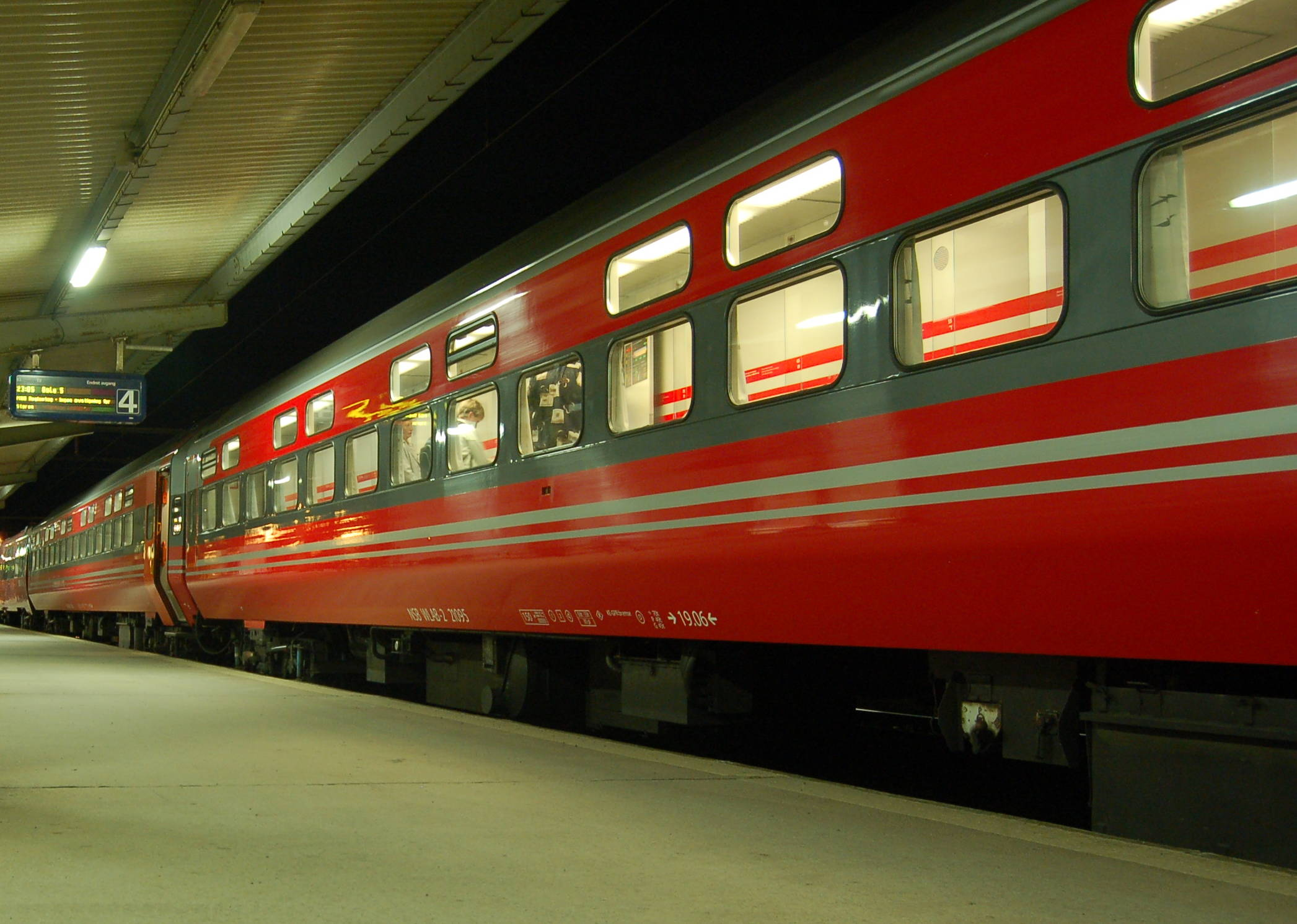
WLAB2 sleeping carriage at Trondheim

These carriages are the longest ones operated by NSB. They are used mostly for express trains on the Bergen Line, the Dovre Line and the Sørland Line. They were built by Strømmen between 1982 and 1989. The Class 7 is and looks considerably more modern than the Class 3 and Class 5, with convex sides and low "aircraft-style" windows. Most of the B7s have two saloons, a smaller one with 24 seats and a larger with 46 seats. The cars are 26.1 m long and weigh about 45 tonnes (50 tons). Most trains with Class 7 carriages have one car with a playroom for families with children (BC7).

All Class 7 cars underwent extensive refurbishment in the period 2008–2011, including improved facilities for disabled passengers, power outlets at all seats, WiFi and free access to Internet. These cars are used on the Sørland Line (Oslo-Kristiansand-Stavanger), Bergen Line (Oslo–Bergen) and Dovre Line (Oslo–Trondheim), replacing partly the Class 73 trains.

A usual Class 7 day train consists of 6 or 7 coaches:

- A7 (1st class)
- BC7 (playroom, wheelchair area)
- B7-6 (2nd class)
- FR7 (bistro)
- 2-3 x B7-4 (2nd class)

A usual Class 7 night train consists of 5 to 7 coaches:

- 2-3 WLAB2 (sleeping coach)
- FR7 (bistro)
- 2-3 x B7-4 (2nd class)

The WLAB2 is the newest, and since the retirement of the old WLAB carriages, the only type of sleeping carriage which is used on night trains on the Bergen, Dovre Sørland and Nordland Lines. The cabins have one or two bunks depending on the fare the passenger pays.

Fourteen will be operated by Go-Ahead Norge from December 2019.
