= NSB WLAB-2 =

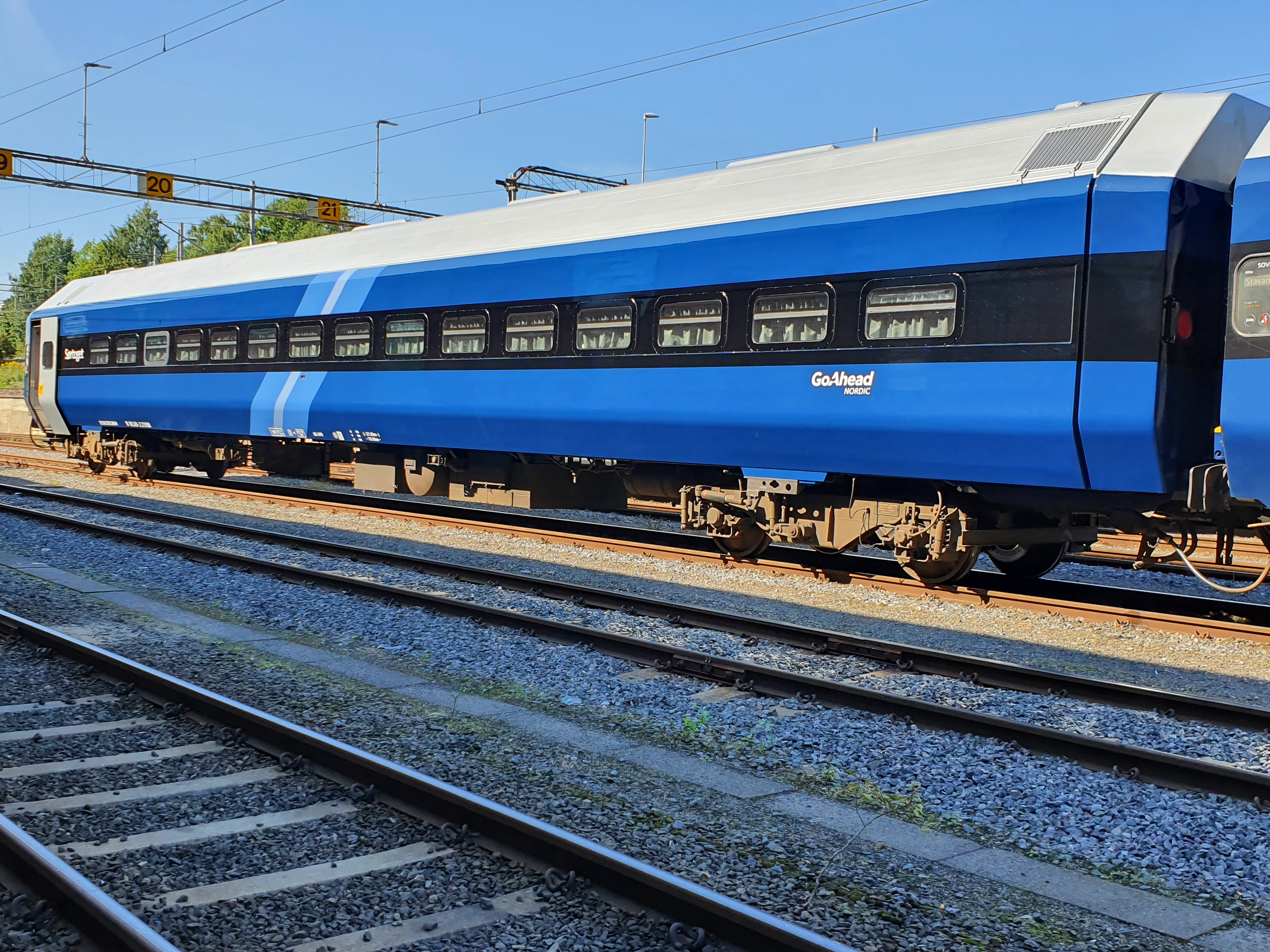
- WLAB-2 of Go-Ahead Norge for Sørlandet Line
- Manufacturer: Strømmens Verksteds
- Constructed: 1984–1987
- Entered service: 1 September 1986
- Number built: 20
- Capacity: 15 compartments
- Operators: Go-Ahead Norge; SJ Norge; Vy
- Lines served: Bergen Line; Dovre Line; Nordland Line; Røros Line; Sørlandet Line

Specifications
- Car body construction: Aluminium
- Car length: 27.00 m (88.58 ft)
- Width: 3.24 m (10.6 ft)
- Height: 4.22 m (13.8 ft)
- Doors: 4
- Wheel diameter: 920 mm (36 in)
- Maximum speed: 150 km/h (93 mph)
- Weight: 48 t (47 long tons; 53 short tons)
- Bogies: Wegmann F
- Braking system(s): Air
- Track gauge: Standard gauge

NSB WLAB-2 or WLAB2 is a class of twenty sleeping cars built by Strømmens Verksted for the Norwegian State Railways (NSB). They serve as the sole sleepers in Norway, being used on the Bergen Line, Dovre Line, Nordland Line and Sørlandet Line. Each car features fifteen compartments, which can each be utilized with a single or twin bunk configuration. The carriages have a unique octagonal shape, are 27 meters (88 ft 7 in) long and weigh 48 tonnes.

Planning of the series started in 1977 and the order was placed in 1984. Each of the units cost 9 million Norwegian krone and were built in 1986 and 1987. The first ordinary service commenced on 1 September 1986.

== History ==
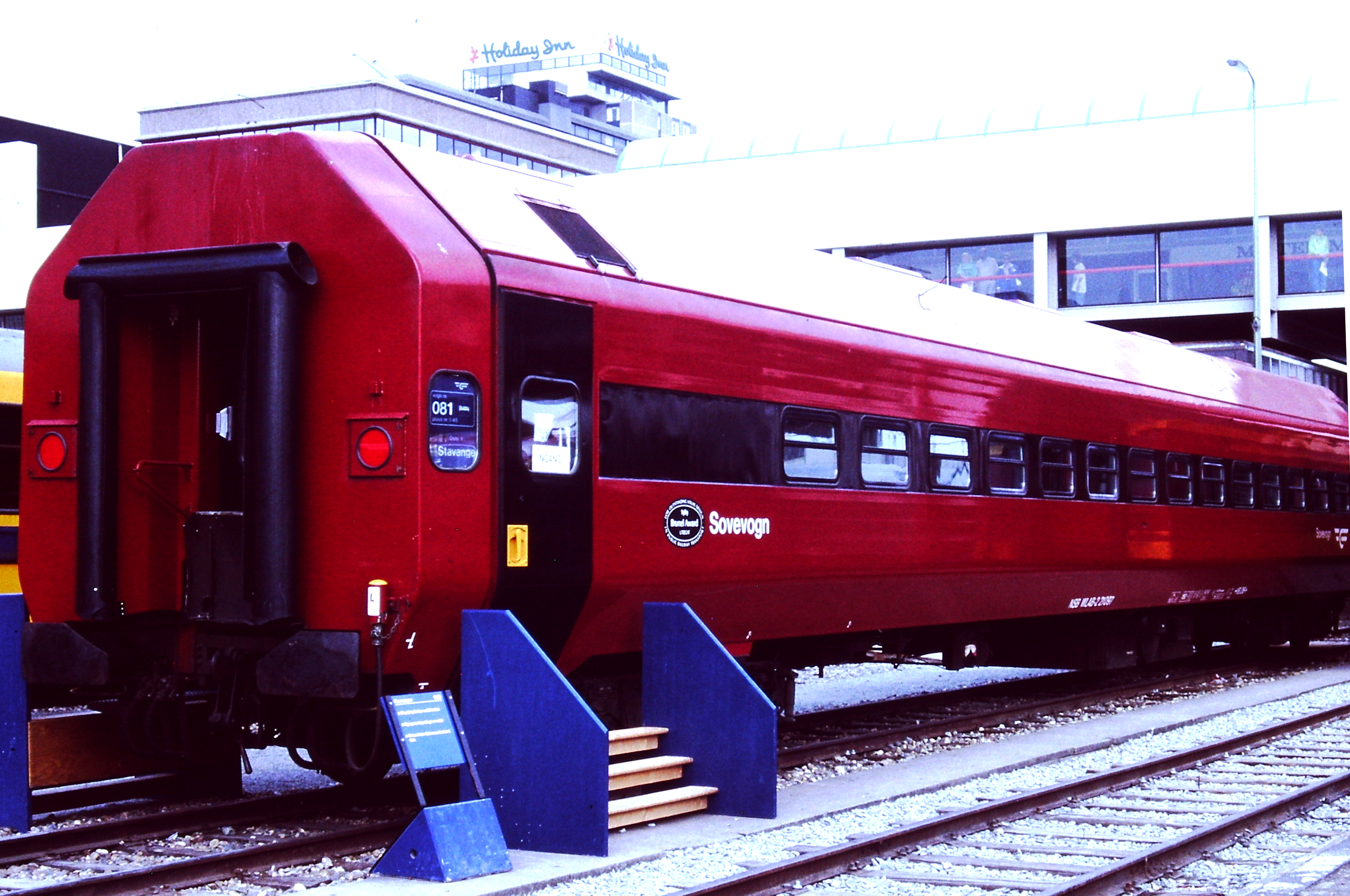
A new carriage on demonstration at Utrecht Centraal, Netherlands, on 7 June 1989

Development of a new class of sleepers commenced in 1977 with a research and development project named T 22 Nytt Passasjervognmateriell ("New Passenger Coach Material"). The first phase looked at market demands and costs, and concluded that the new sleepers should be built exclusively as twin-berthed cabins. More details were developed, allowing the overall design to be established in 1981. An order was placed with Strømmen in June 1984. Each new unit cost 9 million Norwegian krone. The order allowed the most worn of the existing seventy sleeping cars to be retired.

The first two units were delivered in June 1986, allowing them to run trials on the Bergen Line starting 19–20 June. Production continued for a further twelve months, when the twentieth unit was completed. Revenue service commenced on the Bergen Line on 1 September. Later in 1986 the cars were taken into use on the Dovre Line and the Sørlandet Line. The following year they entered service on the Røros Line and the Nordland Line. The only significant operating fault with the carriages was the freezing of the water system during cold spells. This particularly affected the forward toilet, but the issues were soon solved through modifications to the design.

Ahead of the 1994 Winter Olympics in Lillehammer, NSB decided to build a new royal coach. It is modelled after WLAB2, with a similar aluminium body and technical specifications. However, the car features a more elaborate interior and among other amenities includes a shower.

The coaches were upgraded in 2006, receiving new beds and bedding. NSB also changed its policy, so for a fixed fee passengers could book the entire compartment. It was no longer possible to book only a bed in a shared room.

In 2019 the fleet of sleeping-cars was split up between the operators Vy (6 cars for Bergen Line), SJ Norge (10 cars for Dovre Line and Nordland Line) and Go-Ahead Norge (4 cars for Sørlandet Line). The new operators are repainting the cars in their respective colours.

== Specifications ==
WLBA2 has similarities to B7 passenger carriages, which were recently manufactured by Strømmen. The WLAB is tailor-made as a sleeper. The bodies are 27.00 meters (88.58 ft) long. They are dimensioned to maximally exploit the Norwegian loading gauge – measuring 3.24 meters (10 ft 8 in) wide and 4.22 meters (13 ft 10 in) tall, their roofs have an octagonal profile. Despite the aluminium body, each car weighs 48 tonnes (47 long tons; 53 short tons). This is caused by the weight of the insulation between compartments.

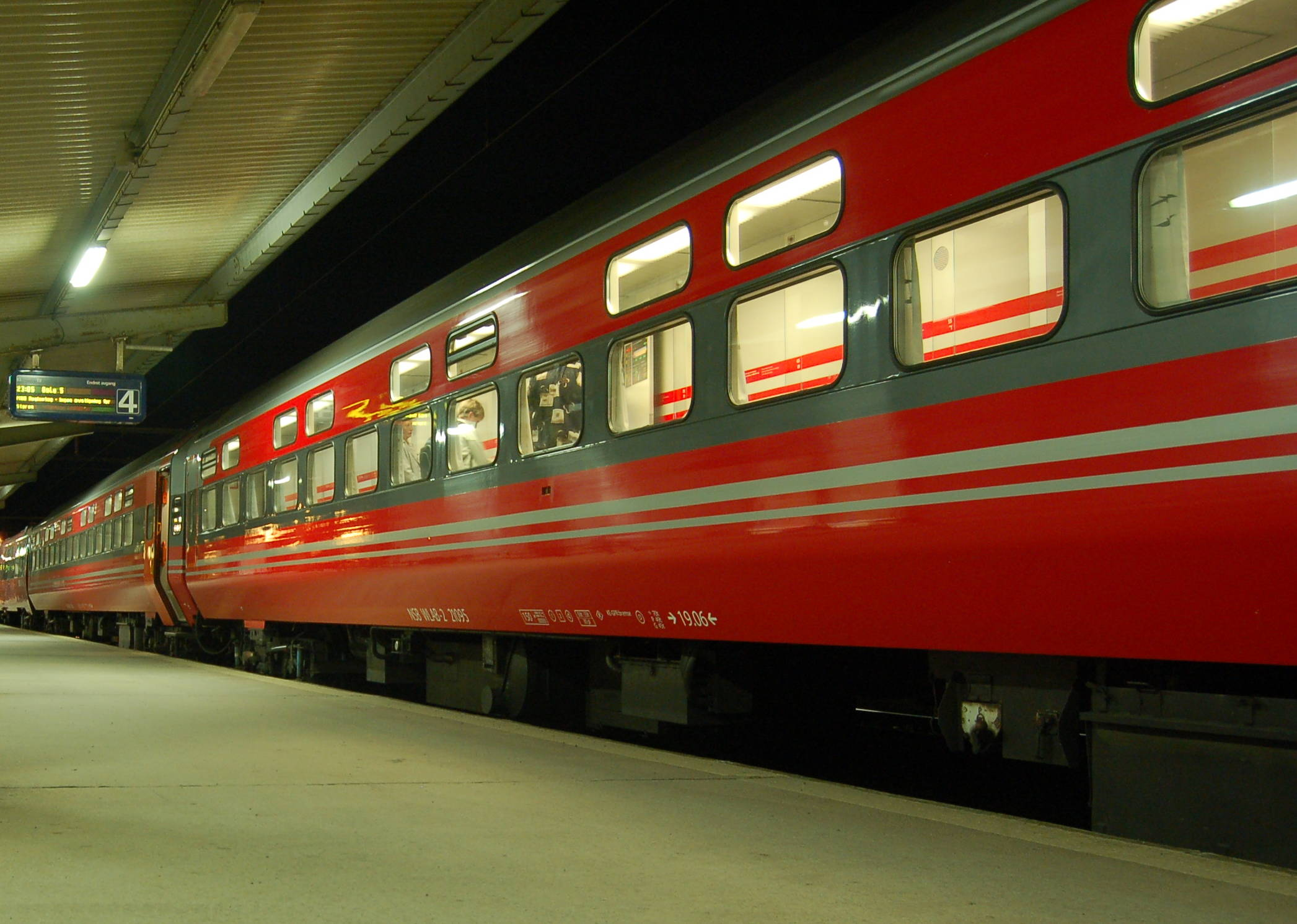
Modernized WLAB2s at Trondheim Central Station

Similar to the contemporary B7, Class 69D and Class 92, WLAB2 received Wegmann-designed bogies in a B-B configuration licence-built by Strømmen. They are modified with softer primary suspension to give a smoother ride. The bogies are rated for a maximum speed of 150 kilometers per hour (93 mph). Each axle features wheels with a new diameter of 610 millimeters (24 in) and two disk brakes. They are powered through a 5-bar (500 kPa) pneumatic cable running through the train. It is supplemented with an auxiliary 6-bar (600 kPa) cable for appliances.

The carriages feature fifteen compartments and a corridor on the one side. There are regular doors at the one end of the carriage, where there is a vestibule, while smaller doors on the other end act as emergency exits. To provide comparability with older WLAB and B5 carriages, WLAB2s were initially installed without a closed gangway connection. On the compartment side there is one window for each compartment. On the corridor side there are two rows of windows and fifteen folding seats, each with place for two people.

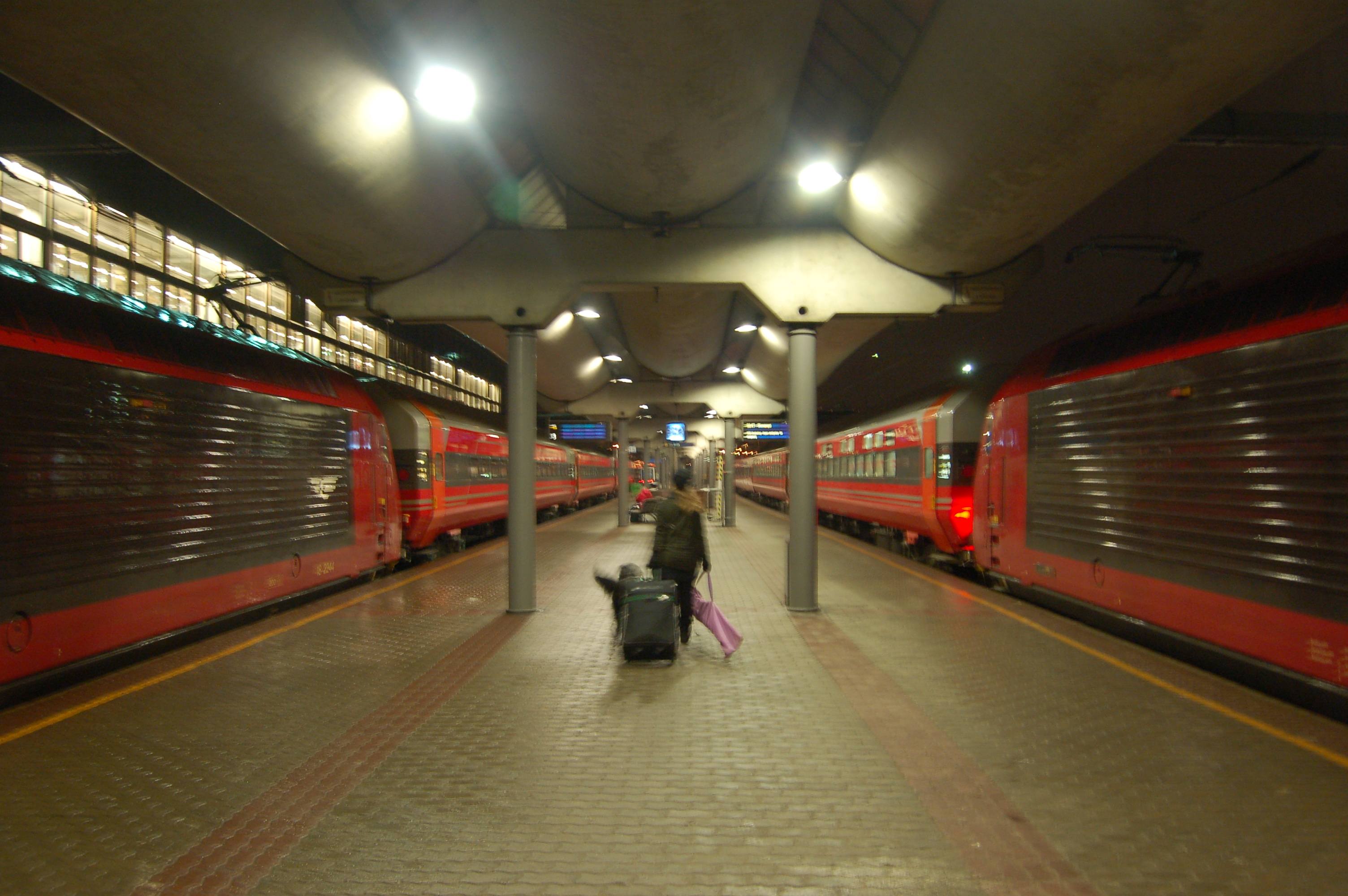
El 18 locomotives at Oslo Central Station ready to haul night trains on the Bergen Line (left) and the Sørlandet Line (right)

The closest compartment to the doors is slightly larger than the others, allowing for enough space for a wheelchair to access it. However, the toilet is not sufficiently large for a wheelchair. Each compartment has a twin-bunk bed. The upper bunk can be collapsed into the wall, allowing the room to be converted to a single. In this configuration the lower bunk can also be used as a sofa, with the walls being upholstered. Initially children could sleep on a balcony room. On the reverse wall of the beds are three niches, two which can be used as a wardrobe and one which features a folding ladder to the upper bunk. There is a folding ladder and a sink in each compartment.

At each end of the carriage is a toilet operated with a vacuum sewer system, identical to those install on B7 and Class 92 trains. a carriage features a 600-liter (130 imp gal; 160 U.S. gal) water tank and a 1,000-liter (220 imp gal; 260 U.S. gal) sewer tank. These, along with the pressure vessel and other accessible equipment, is located on the underside of the carriage. There is an air intake at the end of each carriage, which feeds a duct connecting to each compartment. At the exits there are supplementary heating which allow for individual regulation of the room temperature between 12 and 22 °C (54 and 72 °F). During periods with low outdoor temperature part of the air flow can be recycled. The heating system is regulated electronically. It is not equipped with air conditioning.
