= Strømmen Storsenter =

Shopping centre in Strømmen, Norway

Coordinates: 59°56′51″N 11°0′25″E

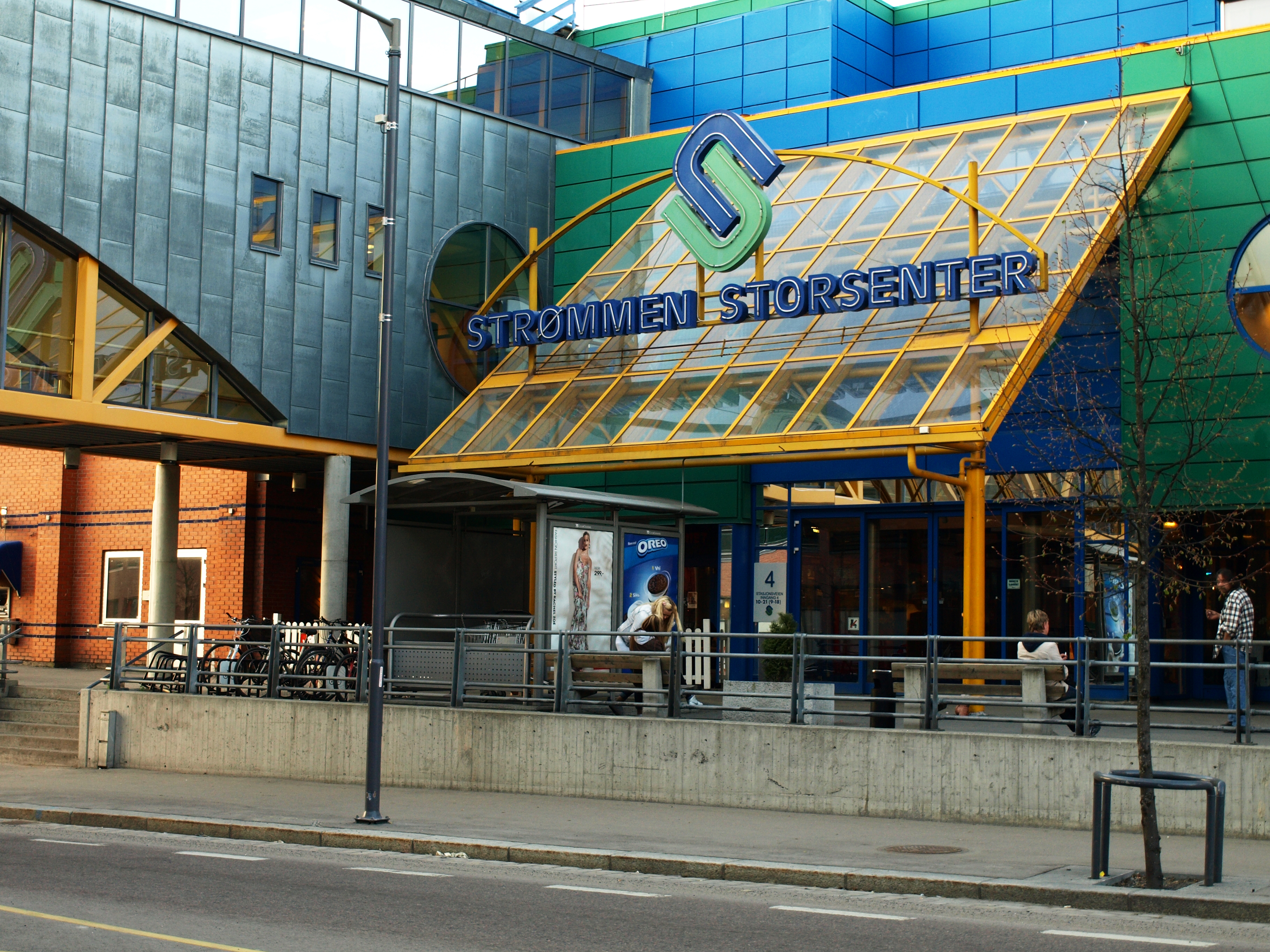
Thon Senter Strømmen

Thon Senter Strømmen, previously Strømmen Storsenter, is a Norwegian shopping centre located in Strømmen, just outside of Oslo, Norway.

== History ==
Thon Senter Strømmen was built on the site of Strømmen Stål, which had closed in the 1970s. It was opened in 1985, with 39 stores, and in 1990 it expanded by another 50. It has been expanded several times since then, the last time in October 2012 with 80 new businesses. Today the shopping centre holds over 200 stores and restaurants, and 2100 parking spots, most of them inside. In 2009 it had a turnover of 2.066 billion Norwegian kroner. In 2009 over four million people visited the mall. It has a size of 65,000 m^{2} distributed over three floors where 2000 employees work. It is now known as the largest shopping mall in Norway.

Thon Senter Strømmen is owned by the Olav Thon Group (Norwegian: Olav Thon Gruppen) which in turn is owned by the Olav Thon Foundation (Olav Thon Stiftelsen). Olav Thon Group operates primarily in the retail and hotel sectors. It operates shopping centers located in Norway and Sweden, as well as Thon Hotels, which is one of Norway's leading hotel chains.

In early March 2026, Strømmen Storsenter was renamed to Thon Senter Strømmen.

== Gallery ==
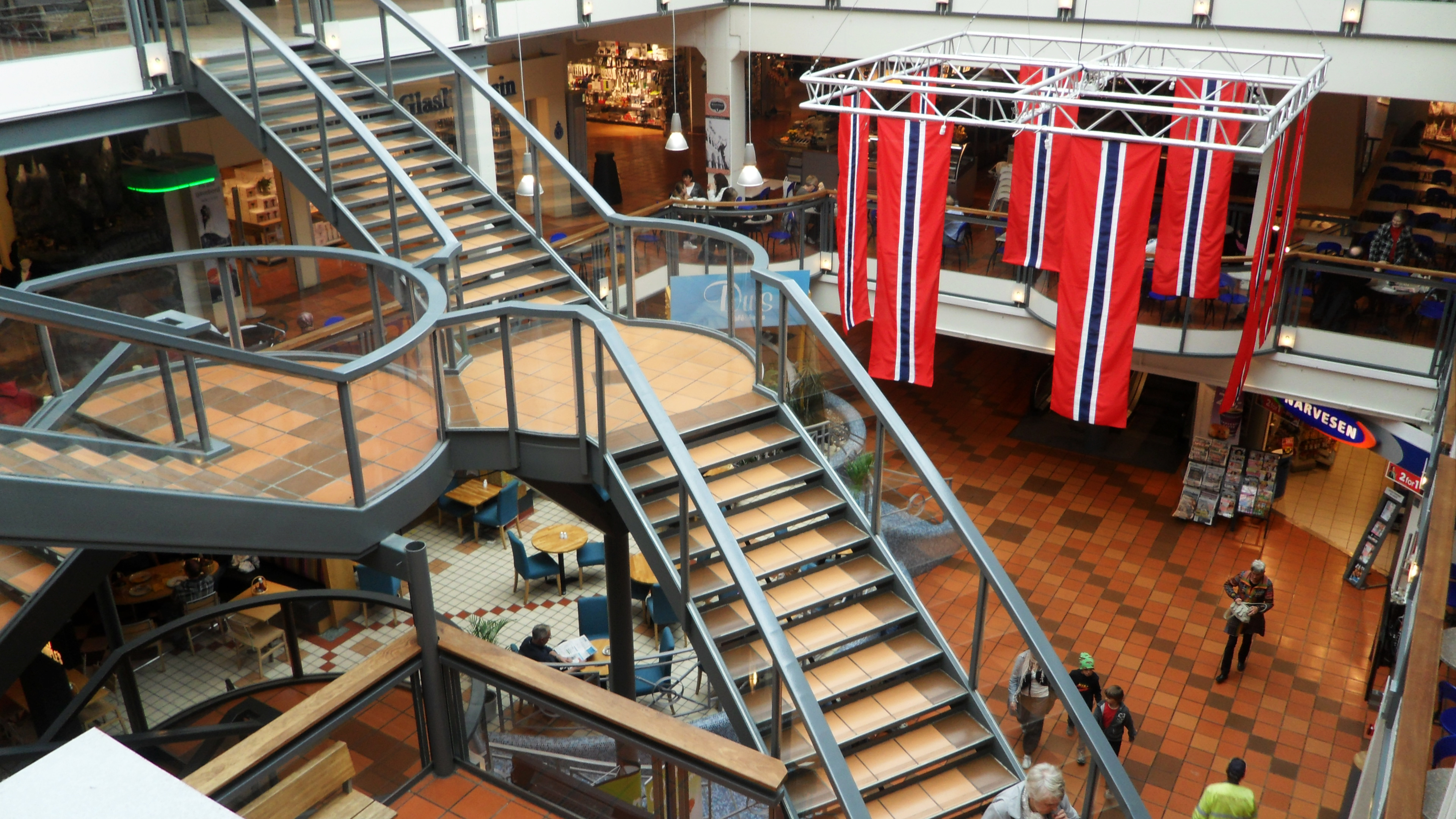

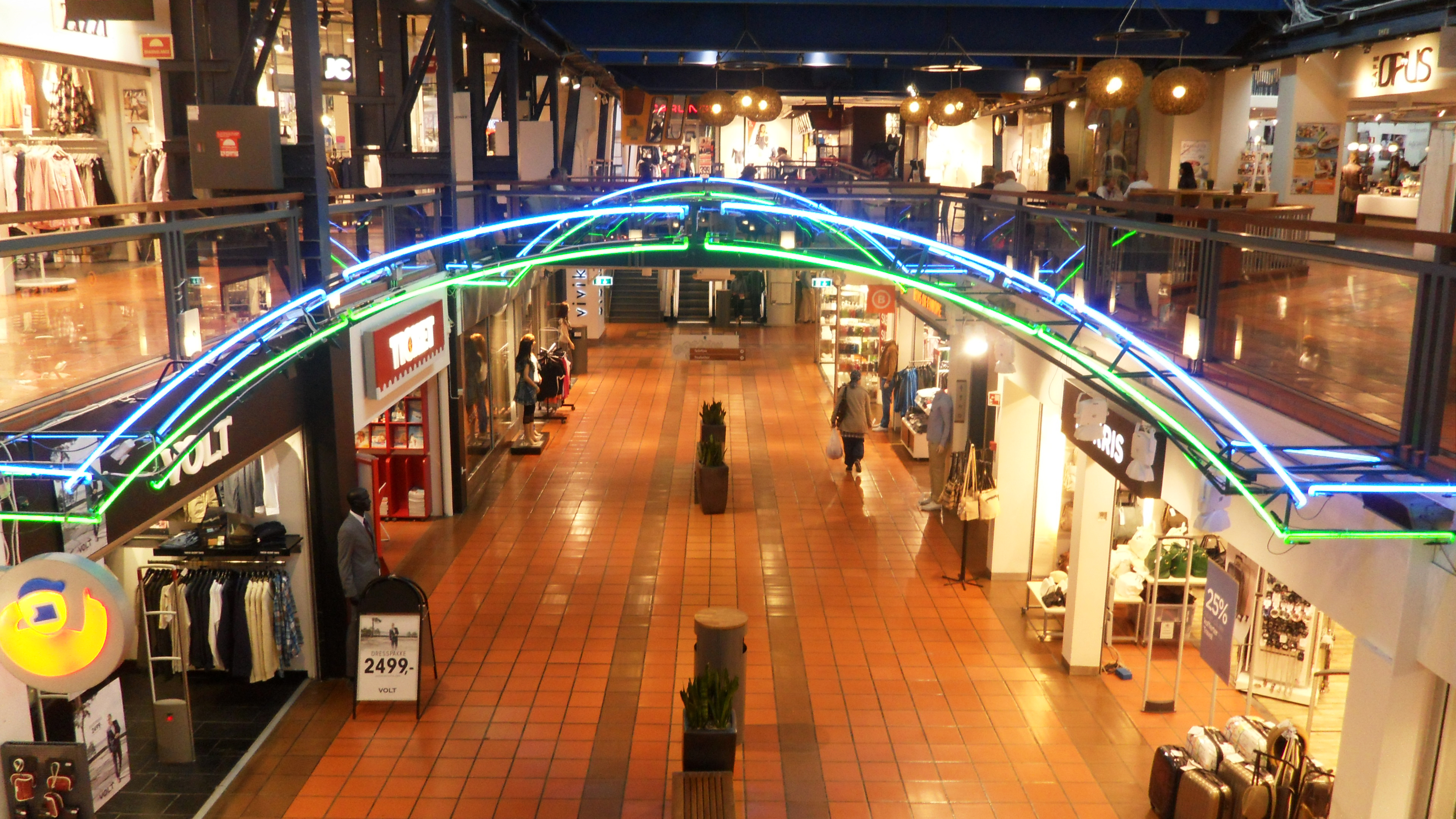

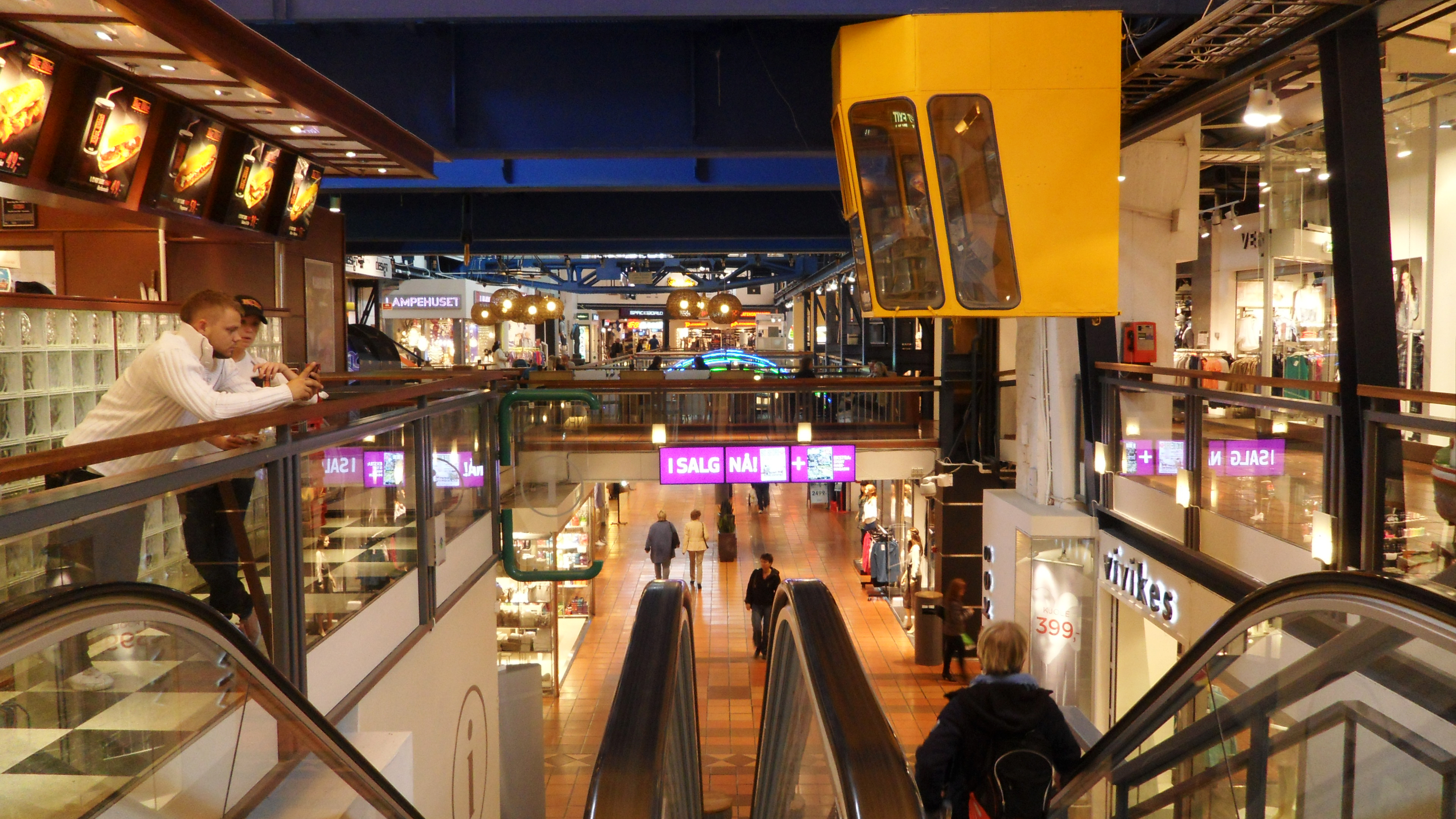
