= Strømmen =

- Town
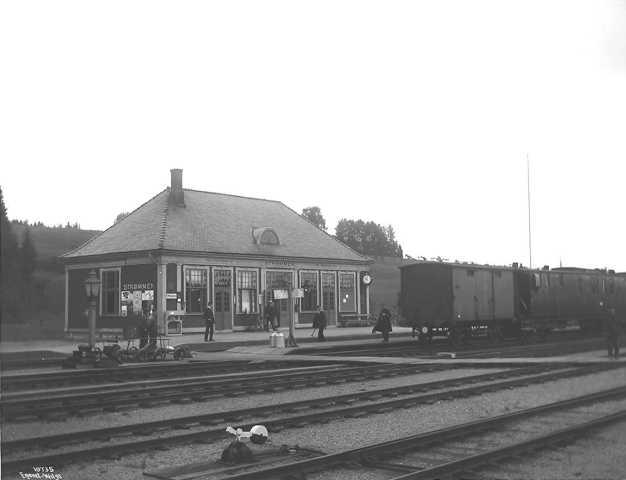
- Strømmen railway station on Hovedbanen, in Skedsmo, Norway

- Location within Akershus
- Coordinates: 59°57′N 11°0′E
- Country: Norway
- County: Akershus
- Municipality: Lillestrøm

Population (2013)
  - Total: 11,410
- Time zone: UTC+1 (CET)
  - Summer (DST): UTC+2 (CEST)

Strømmen is a town in Lillestrøm municipality, Akershus county, Norway. It is about twenty kilometers east of Oslo, and considered part of Greater Oslo. It has around 11,400 residents.

The town has its origins from floating lumber and sawmills along Sagelva. Later there has been heavy industry at Strømmen, including the railway stock manufacturer Strømmens Værksted. It currently hosts one of Norway's largest shopping centre, Strømmen Storsenter. Strømmen had a top-level women's football team, Team Strømmen until 2009, while Strømmen IF will play in second top-level from the 2010 season.
