= TS Class 5 =

Class of Norwegian trams

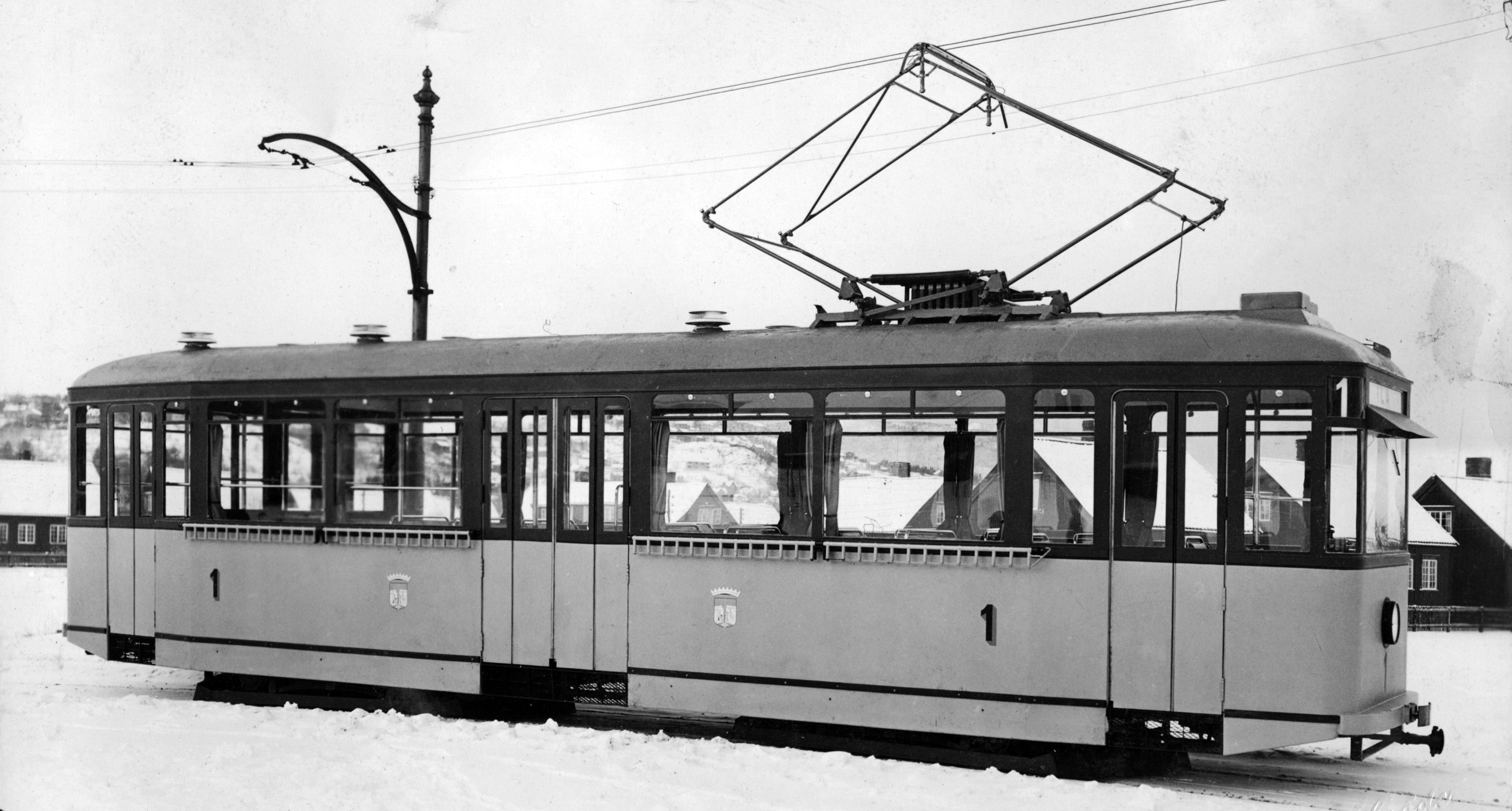

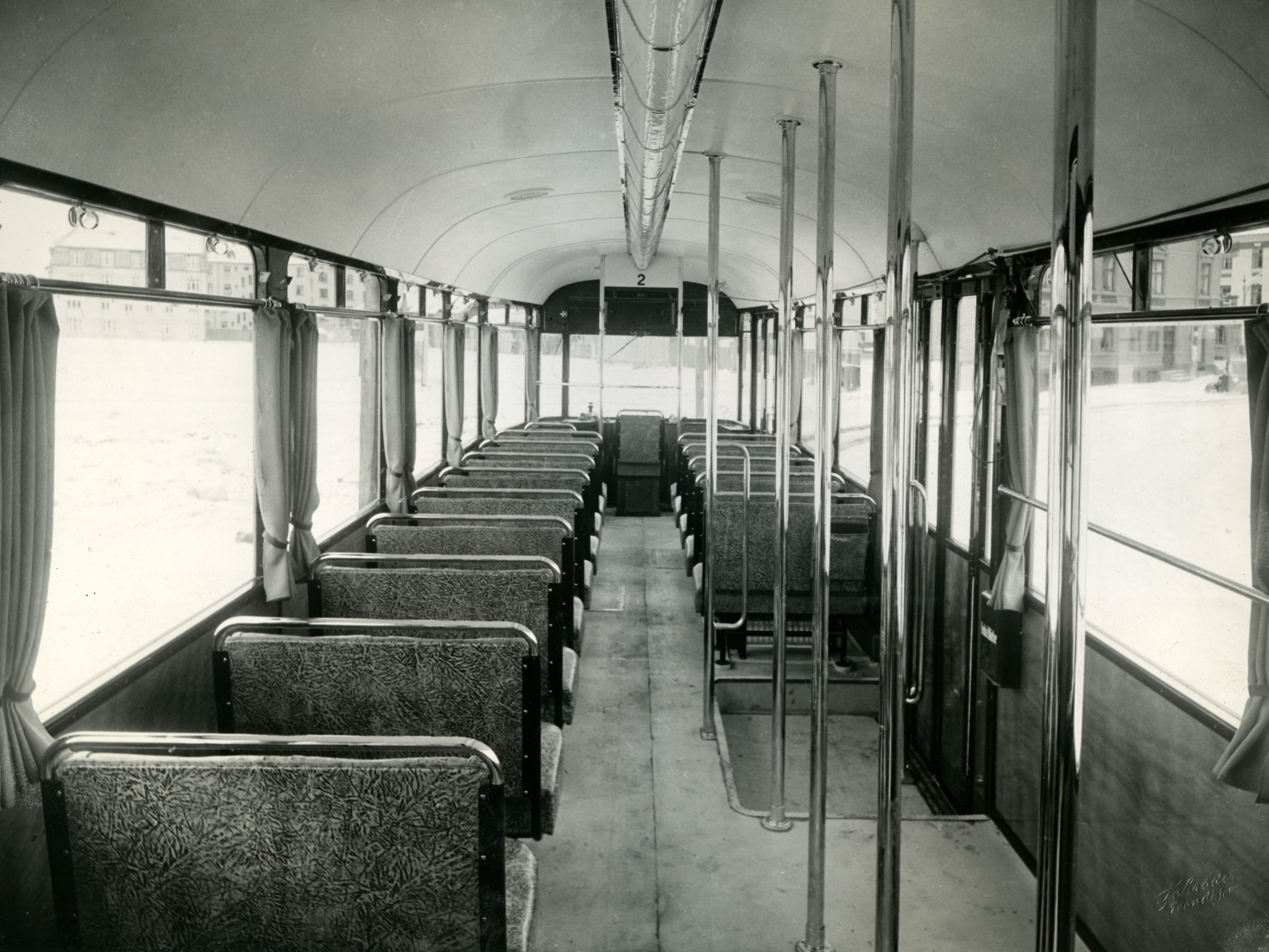
- Manufacturer: Skabo
- Constructed: 1937–42
- Entered service: 1938
- Scrapped: 10 October 1956
- Number built: 6
- Number preserved: 1
- Fleet numbers: 1–6
- Capacity: 33 (seated) + 52 (standing)
- Operators: Trondheim Sporvei

Specifications
- Car body construction: Wood
- Car length: 12.5 m (41 ft 0 in)
- Width: 2.6 m (8 ft 6 in)
- Doors: 6
- Weight: 14.2 t (14.0 long tons; 15.7 short tons)
- Prime mover(s): Siemens S02 (1–4); British Thomson-Houston 109E2 (5–6)
- Power output: 132 kW (177 hp) (1–4); 124 kW (166 hp) (5–6)
- Electric system(s): 600 V DC
- Current collection: Pantograph
- Track gauge: 1,000 mm (3 ft 3 3/8 in)

TS Class 5 was a series of six trams built by Skabo Jernbanevognfabrikk for Trondheim Sporvei. Four were delivered from December 1937 to February 1938, while two were delivered in May 1942.

The first four were delivered with four Siemens motors, each at 33 kW (44 hp). The last two were delivered during World War II with British Thomson-Houston, each at 31 kW (42 hp). The two BTH-engines underperformed compared to the sister engines, and were the only delivery to the Trondheim Tramway not from Siemens throughout the tramways history. The Class 5 was the first bogie cars used by Trondheim Sporvei. They remained in service until the Dalsenget fire on 10 October 1956, in which five of the trams burnt down. No. 6 survived the fire, and has been preserved at Trondheim Tramway Museum.

In November 1942, Skabo also delivered five trailers, numbered 101 through 105. All of these were lost during the fire.
