= TS Class 6 =

Class of Norwegian trams

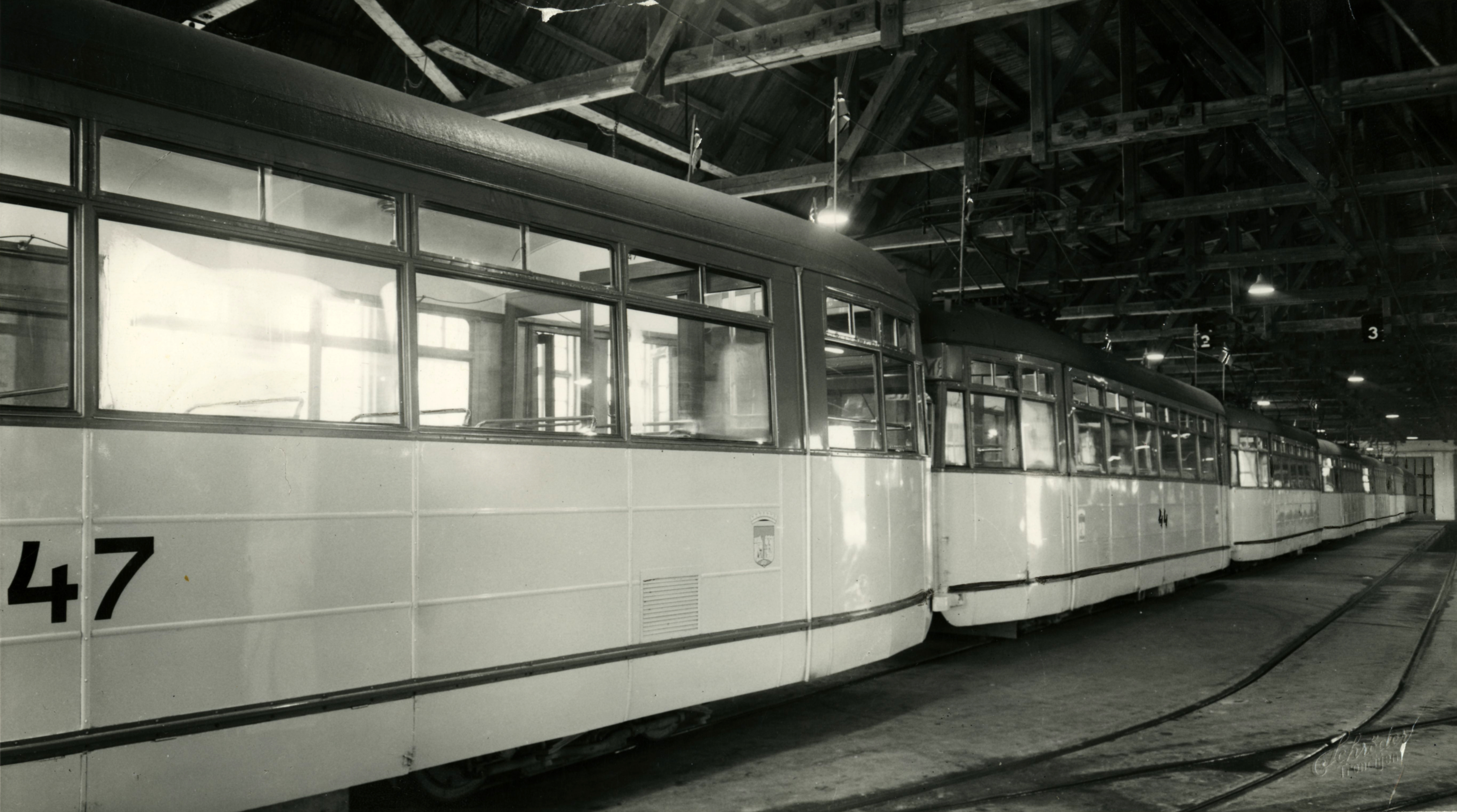
- Manufacturer: Strømmen
- Constructed: 1948–49, 1955
- Entered service: 1949
- Scrapped: 10 October 1956
- Number built: 16
- Number preserved: 0
- Fleet numbers: 40–49, 7–12
- Capacity: 33 (seated) + 52 (standing) (40–49); 37 (seated) + 50 (standing) (7–12)
- Operators: Trondheim Sporvei

Specifications
- Car length: 13.2 m (43 ft 4 in)
- Width: 2.6 m (8 ft 6 in)
- Doors: 6
- Weight: 15.0 t (14.8 long tons; 16.5 short tons)
- Prime mover(s): NEBB GDTM 1252
- Power output: 172 kW (231 hp)
- Current collection: Pantograph
- Track gauge: 1,000 mm (3 ft 3 3/8 in)

TS Class 6 was a series of sixteen trams built by Strømmens Værksted for Trondheim Sporvei. They were delivered in two slightly different batches; ten in 1948–49 and six in 1955.

The trams delivered with four Siemens motors, each at 43 kW (58 hp). They remained in service until the Dalsenget fire on 10 October 1956, in which all burnt down. It is the only class of trams that has not been preserved by the Trondheim Tramway Museum.
