= Norwegian Railway Museum =

Transport museum in Hamar, Norway

- Norsk Jernbanemuseum
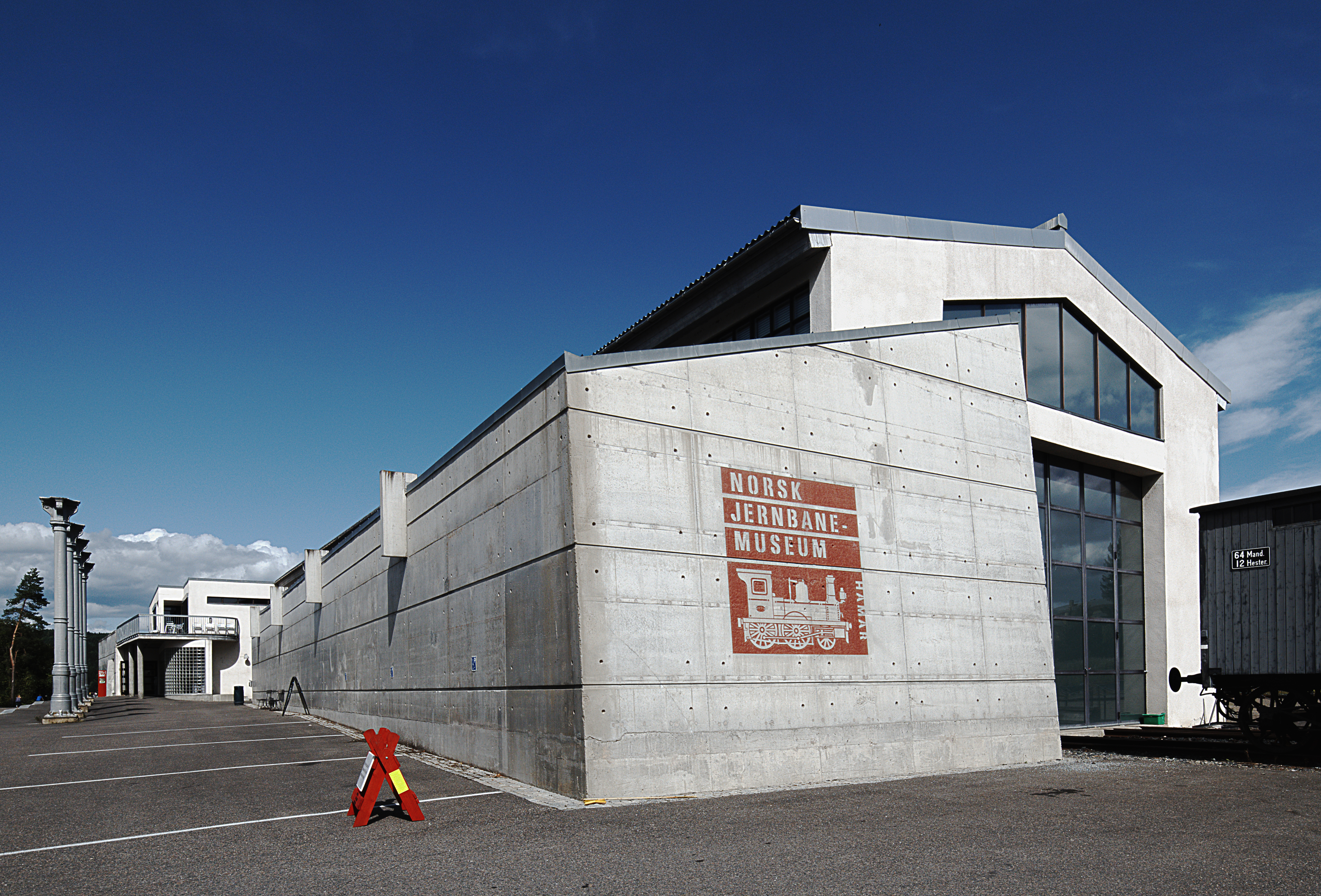
- Norwegian Railway Museum administration and main exhibition hall
- Established: 1896
- Location: Hamar, Innlandet, Norway
- Coordinates: 60°47′51″N 11°02′06″E

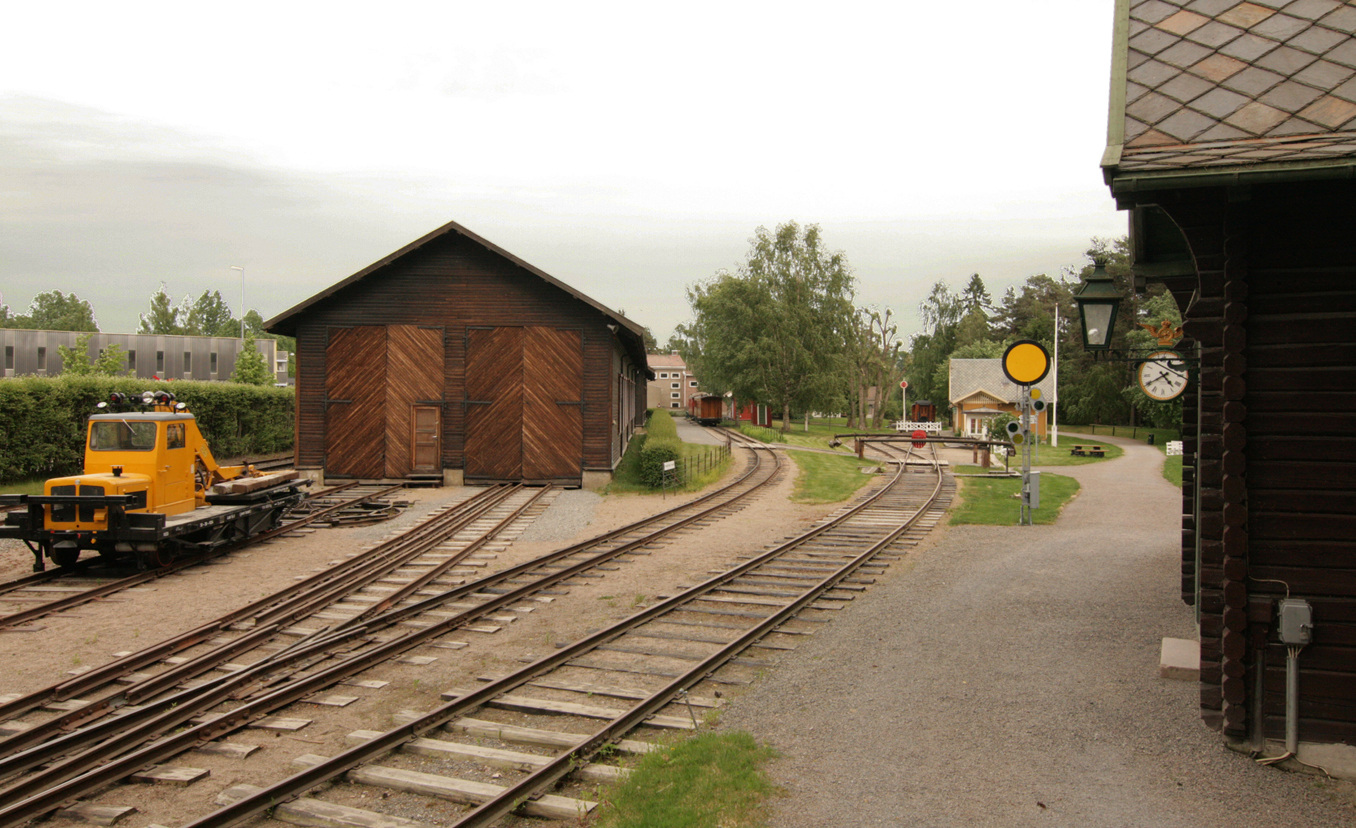
Norwegian Railway Museum, Hamar

The Norwegian Railway Museum (Norwegian: Norsk Jernbanemuseum) is located at Hamar in Innlandet county, Norway. It is Norway's national railway museum.

== History ==
Norwegian Railway Museum logo

Established in 1896, until 1912 the collection was housed on the second floor of the Hamar Station. The museum is now located at the museum park at Martodden by Lake Mjøsa.

The museum and has a unique collection relating to Norwegian railway history. The collection includes several of Norway's oldest station building which have been relocated to the park. The museum also has locomotives and carriages dating back to the very earliest days of the railway in Norway. Locomotive and carriages are displayed indoors and outdoors. They include one of Norway's largest steam locomotives - known as Dovregubben - and carriages which were part of the Norwegian Royal Train. The museum park is laid out with tracks, signals, locomotive halls, working restaurant car which is open to the public and Narvesen newspaper kiosk. Two trains run on the museum grounds during the summer: "Tertitten" (narrow gauge train) and "Knertitten" (mini train).

Exhibits in the new museum building include objects, models and illustrations relating to Norwegian railway history, as well as video displays, games, animations and railway music. Open-air exhibits are only open during the summer. The museum also has a large library and photo collection. The photo collection has a large number of photographs from around 1860 through to today. The photographs are ones taken by professional photographers, railway employees and private individuals. The museum is connected to the Dovre Line by a branch line.

== Gallery ==
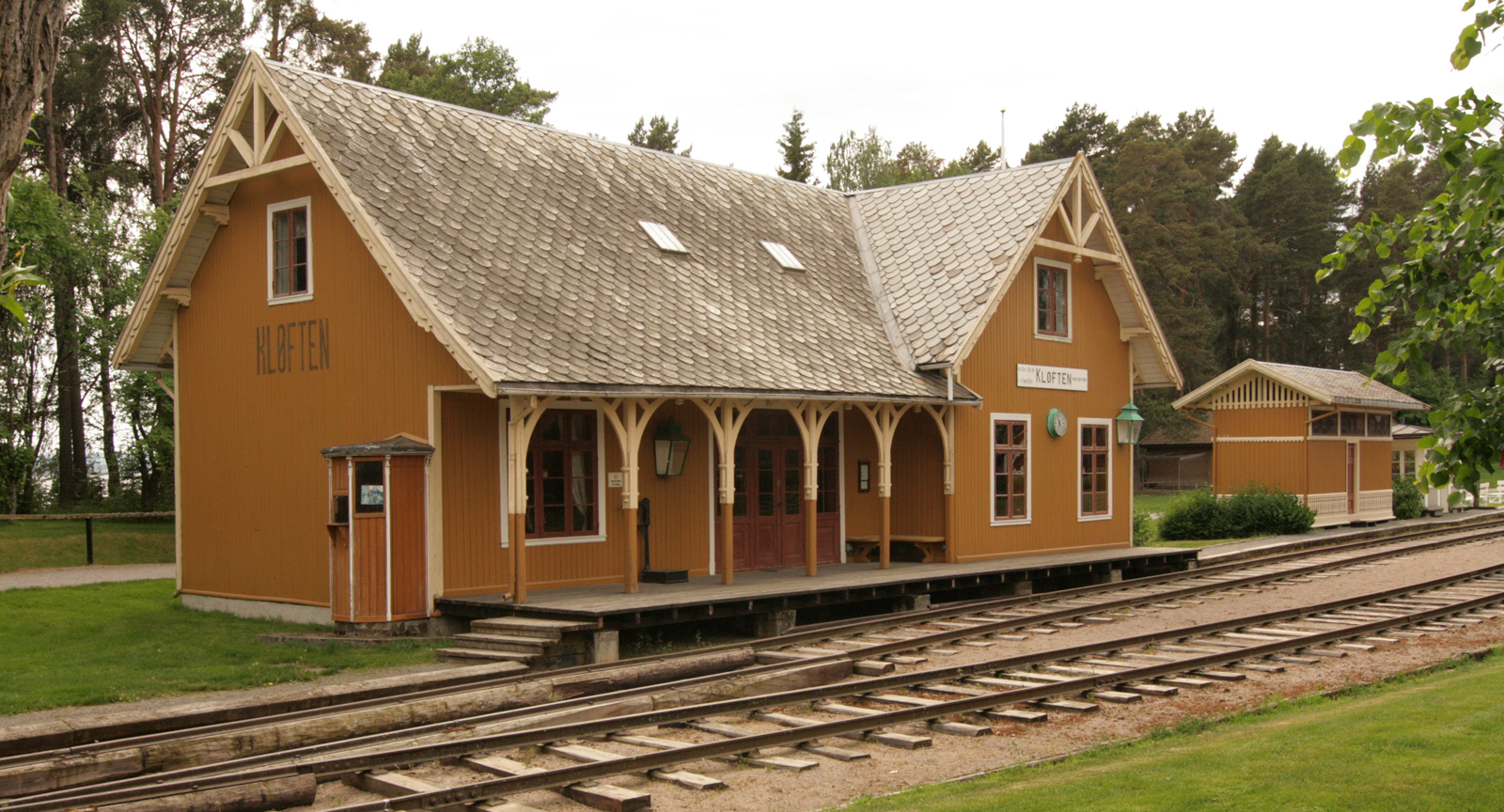
Kløft Railway Station

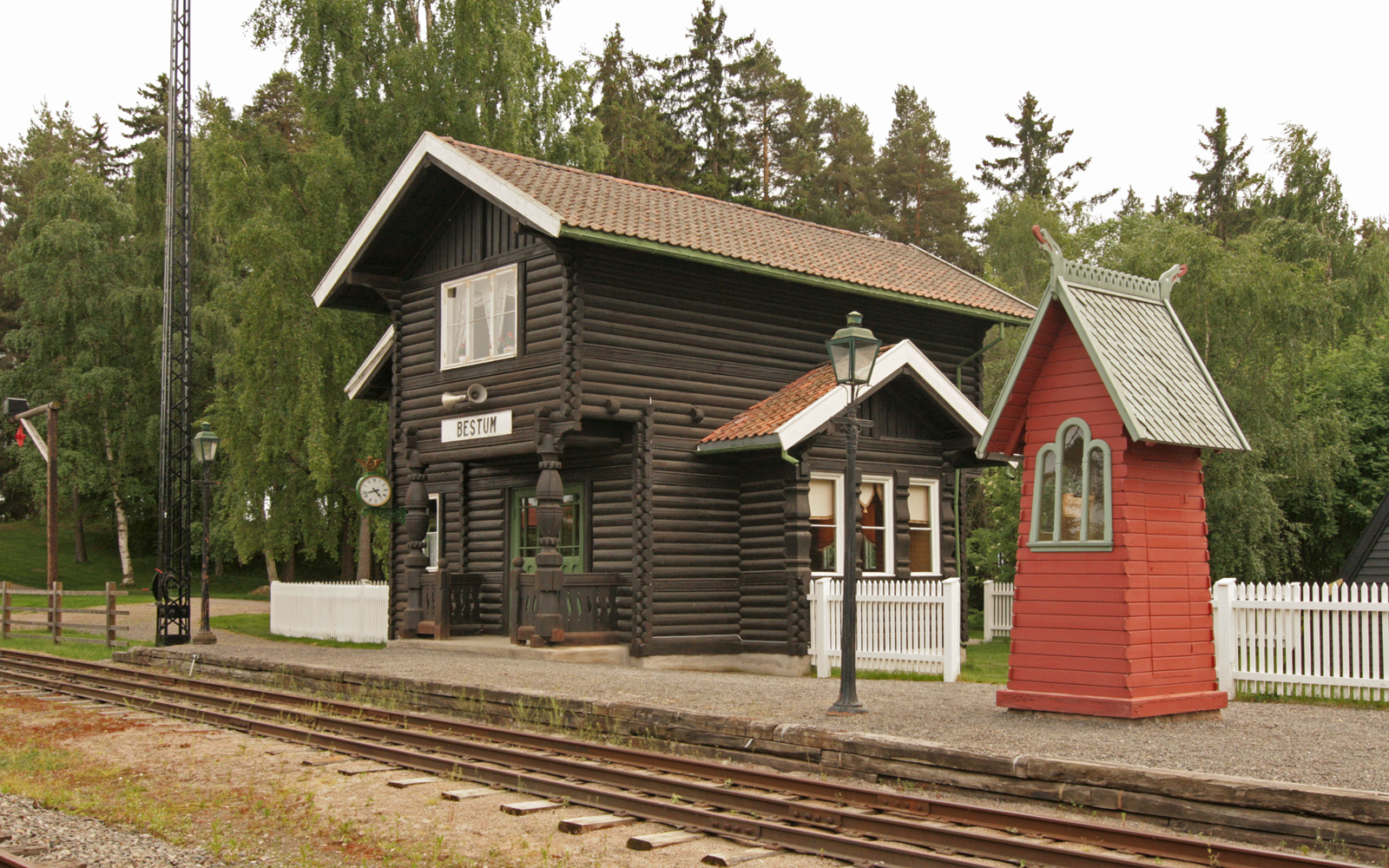
Bestum Railway Station

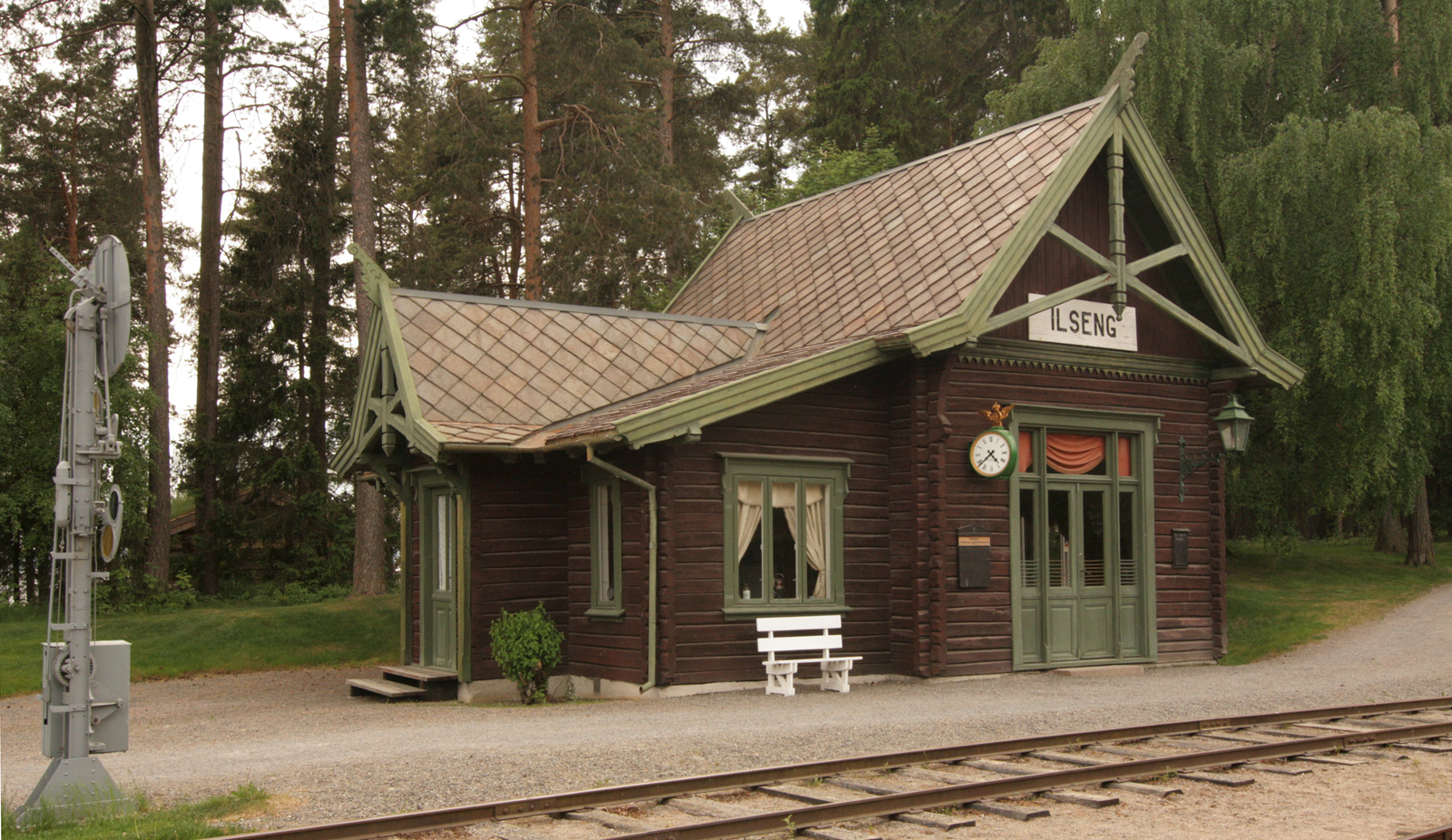
Ilseng Railway Station

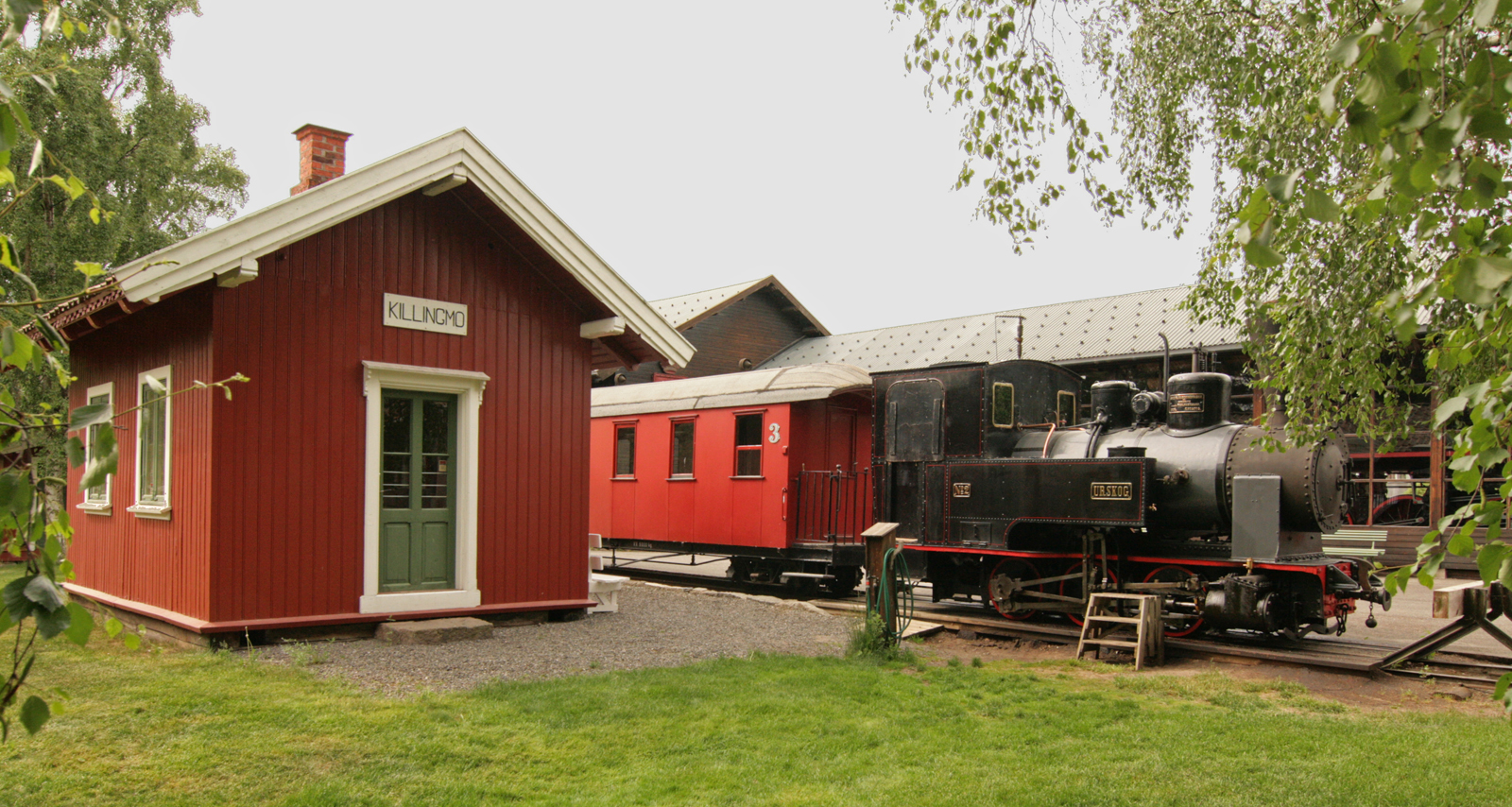
Kjellingmo Railway Station

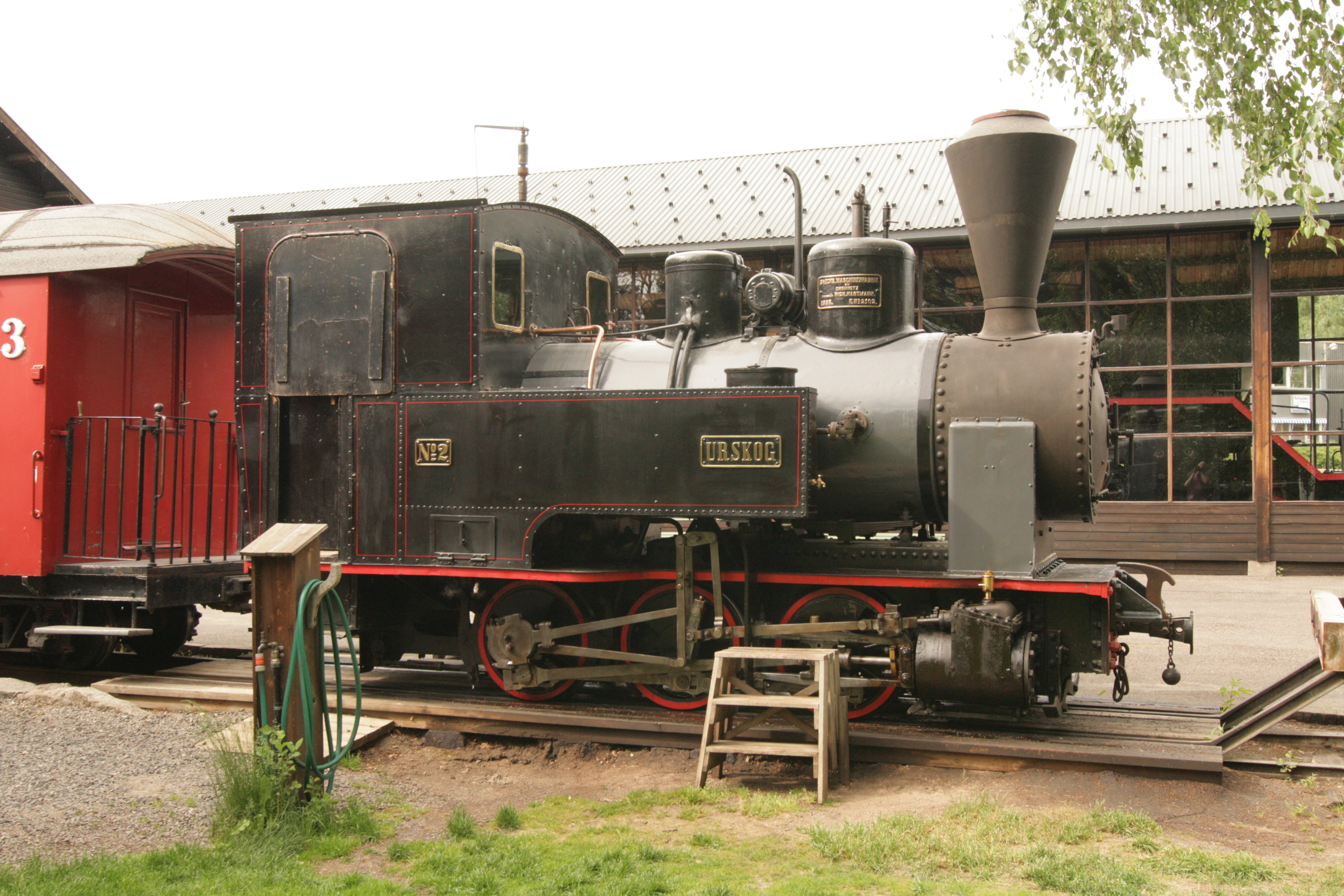
Urskog–Høland Line NSB type XXVII

== See also ==
- History of rail transport in Norway
- Norwegian Railway Club
- Rail transport in Norway

== Other sources ==
- Bjerke, Thor; Holom, Finn (2004) Banedata 2004 (Oslo, Hamar: Norsk Jernbanemuseum & Norsk Jernbaneklubb) ISBN 82-90286-28-7
