= Norwegian Royal Train =

Train carriage used by the Norwegian royal family

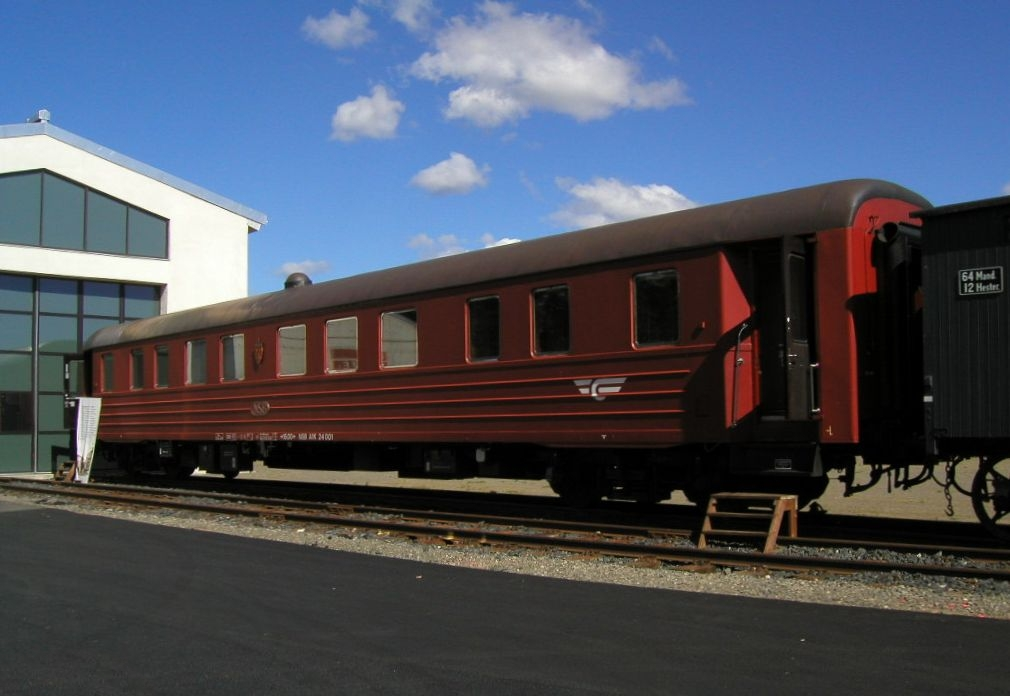
The former A1 carriage outside the Norwegian Railway Museum.

The Norwegian Royal Train is one train carriage used by the Norwegian royal family and maintained by the Norwegian Railway Museum. The current carriage, named A4, was introduced in 1994 in connection with the Lillehammer Olympics and replaced a carriage from 1962, which was based on the B3 carriages generation, named A1. The carriage contains a main sleeping compartment with dressing room and adjoining bathroom, two guest compartments, guest bathroom, kitchen, guard compartments and a combined dining and conference room.

The carriage is pulled by ordinary railway locomotives and most often ordinary passenger carriages for press and other guests are added.

== See also ==
- Royal train
- Royal yacht
- Official state car
- Air transports of heads of state and government
