= Strømmens Værksted =

Norwegian rail vehicle manufacturer

Strømmens Verksted A/S
- Industry: Rolling stock
- Founded: 1873
- Fate: Merger
- Successor: Bombardier Transportation
- Headquarters: Skedsmo, Norway

Strømmens Værksted A/S was an industrial company based in Skedsmo, Norway, specialising in the production of rolling stock. Founded in 1873, it remains as a part of Bombardier Transportation. The plant is located just off Hovedbanen west of Strømmen Station.

== History ==
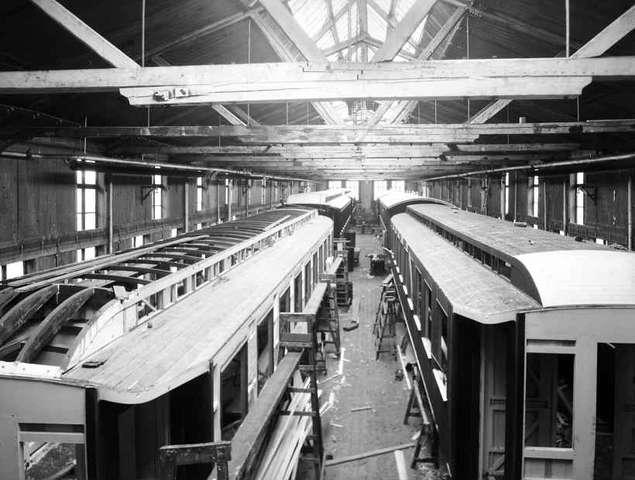
Manufacturing train cars in 1924

The company was established as a mechanical workshop and an iron works in 1873 by engineer Wincentz Thurmann Ihlen, with the name W. Ihlen, Strømmen. The main product was railway cars, with the first being produced in 1874. The Ihlen family retained ownership of the company, with Nils Claus Ihlen taking over the works in 1883, changing the name to Strømmens Værksted, and his sons Joakim and Alf Ihlen in 1908, who transformed it to a limited company. Nils Claus Ihlen would later become Minister of Labour, overseeing the opening of the Bergen Line among others.

The iron works were rebuilt to steel works in 1902, and the first sterling produced delivered, soon specializing in propellers up to four tonnes. In 1925 Strømmens started production of buses, with the first delivery in 1929. It was built in aluminum and equipped with a Leyland engine. The most important customer was Oslo Sporveier, and during World War II some of the buses were rebuilt to trolleybuses. The works also mounted Dodge cars for as taxis.

In 1970 the company was split in two independent companies. Strømmens Verksted A/S with the railway factory and Strømmen Stål A/S with the steel works. Strømmen Stål was closed in the 1970s, and a few years later Thon Gruppen bought it and transformed to the shopping mall Strømmen Storsenter, now one of the largest in the country.

The workshop is still in use. After having been bought by Norsk Elektrisk & Brown Boveri, the Norwegian subsidiary of Brown, Boveri & Cie (BBC) in 1978, it was later transferred to Asea Brown Boveri in 1988 when it merged with Elektrisk Bureau to form EB Strømmens Verksted, Adtranz in 1996 when it was named Adtranz Strømmen, in 1999 sold to Daimler Chrysler changing the name to Daimler Chrysler Rail System Norway and then to Bombardier Transportation, changing the name to Bombardier Transportation Norway. The division is mainly occupied with maintenance and modernizing of rolling stock for NSB. The new Norwegian Royal Train is one of the last cars built at Strømmen.

== Rolling stock production ==
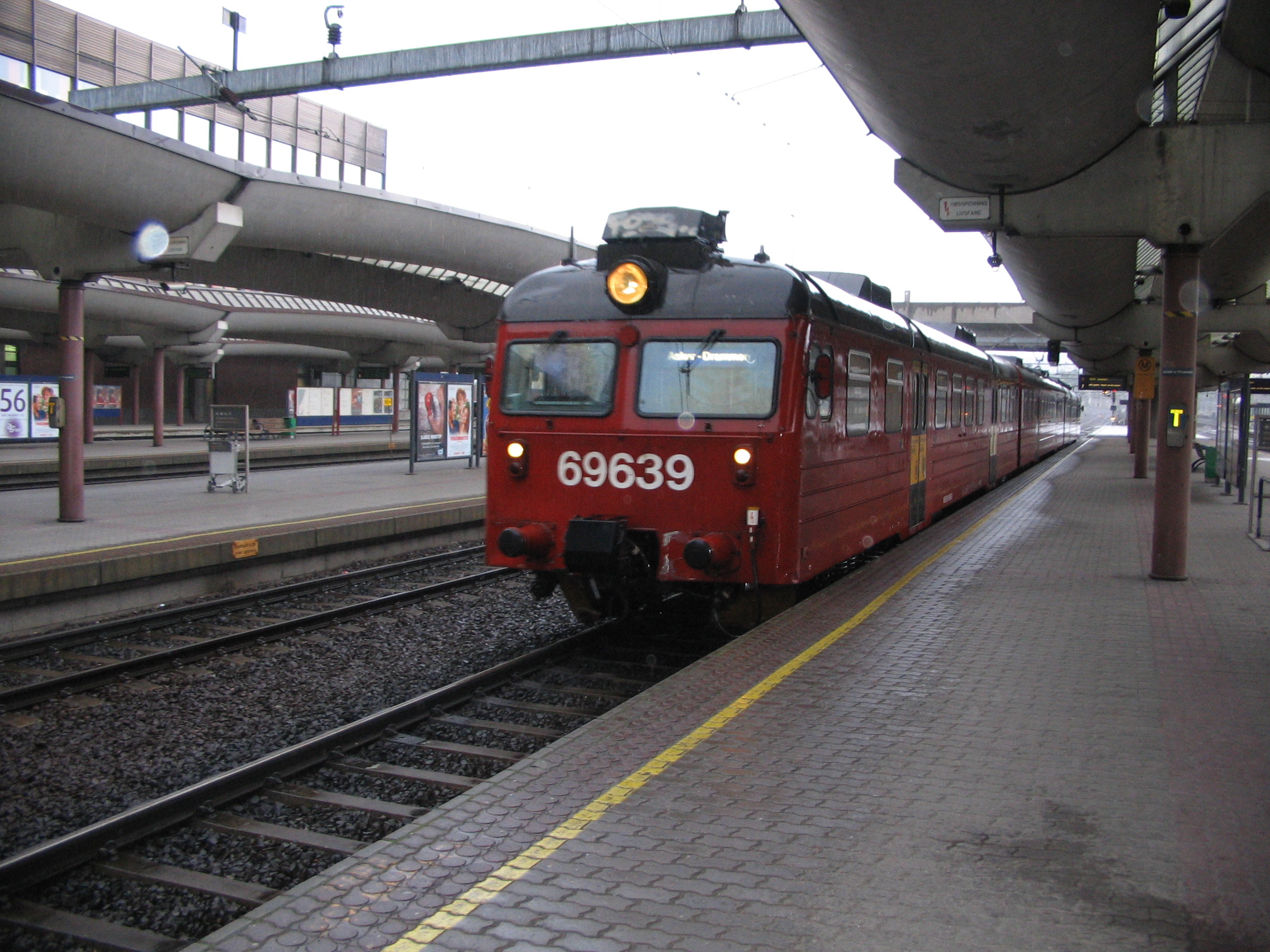
A NSB BM69 at Oslo Central Station

Strømmens has been a large manufacturer of railway cars, including several models for Norges Statsbaner as well as local trains, multiple units for the Oslo Metro and trams for the Oslo Tramway and Trondheim Tramway. During the 1990s most of the new electric locomotives and EMUs delivered to NSB were built by Adtranz Strømmen.

- Norges Statsbaner
  - NSB Cmb14 railcar
  - NSB Cmb17 railcar
  - NSB Class 69 commuter EMU
  - NSB Class 73 high-speed tilting EMU
  - NSB Class 86 DMU
  - NSB Class 87 DMU
  - NSB Class 88 DMU
  - NSB Class 91 DMU
  - NSB El 18 locomotive
  - B3 carriages
  - B5 carriages
  - B7 carriages
  - Norwegian Royal Train
- Airport Express Train
  - GMB Class 71 high-speed EMU
- Oslo Metro
  - OS T1000
  - OS T1300
  - OS T2000
- Oslo Tramway
  - SL79
- Trondheim Tramway
  - TS Class 4
  - TS Class 6
  - TS Class 7
