= Norske Tog Class 93 =

Class of DMUs of Norway

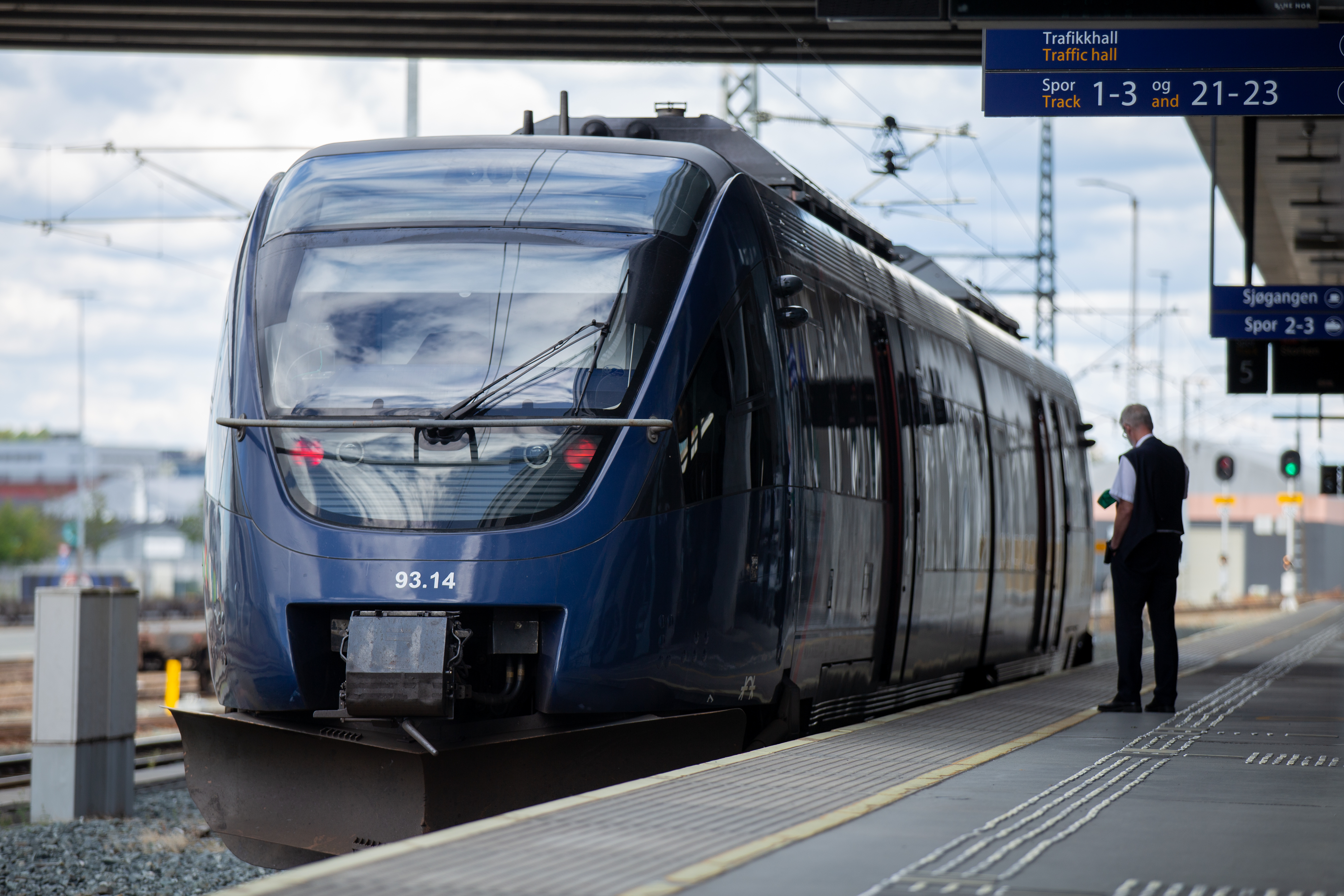
- Class 93 at Trondheim station
- In service: 2000–present
- Manufacturer: Bombardier
- Family name: Talent
- Number built: 15 units
- Formation: 2 cars
- Capacity: 76 (originally 88)
- Operator: SJ Norge
- Lines served: Nordland Line; Rauma Line; Røros Line

Specifications
- Car length: 38.21 m (125 ft 4 in)
- Width: 2.92 m (9 ft 7 in)
- Height: 3.97 m (13 ft 0 in)
- Maximum speed: 140 km/h (87 mph)
- Weight: 77 t (76 long tons; 85 short tons)
- Prime mover: Cummins N14E-R
- Track gauge: 1,435 mm (4 ft 8 1/2 in)

Class 93 (Norwegian: Type 93) is a tilting two-carriage diesel multiple unit used by SJ Norge for passenger trains on non-electrified stretches of the Norwegian railway network. Used on the Nordland Line, the Røros Line and the Rauma Line, they were purchased to replace the aging Di 3 locomotive-hauled trains. The Class 93 was produced by Bombardier, and is part of the Talent family. Fifteen units were delivered between 2000 and 2002.

Powered by two Cummins diesel engines with a combined output of 612 kW (821 hp), the trains are capable of speeds of 140 km/h (87 mph). The trains entered service as part of the Agenda regional train concept. However, the technical problems to which the units have been prone and a cramped interior design have made them unpopular among riders. In 2007, the units were replaced by locomotive-hauled trains on some services on the Nordland Line.

== History ==
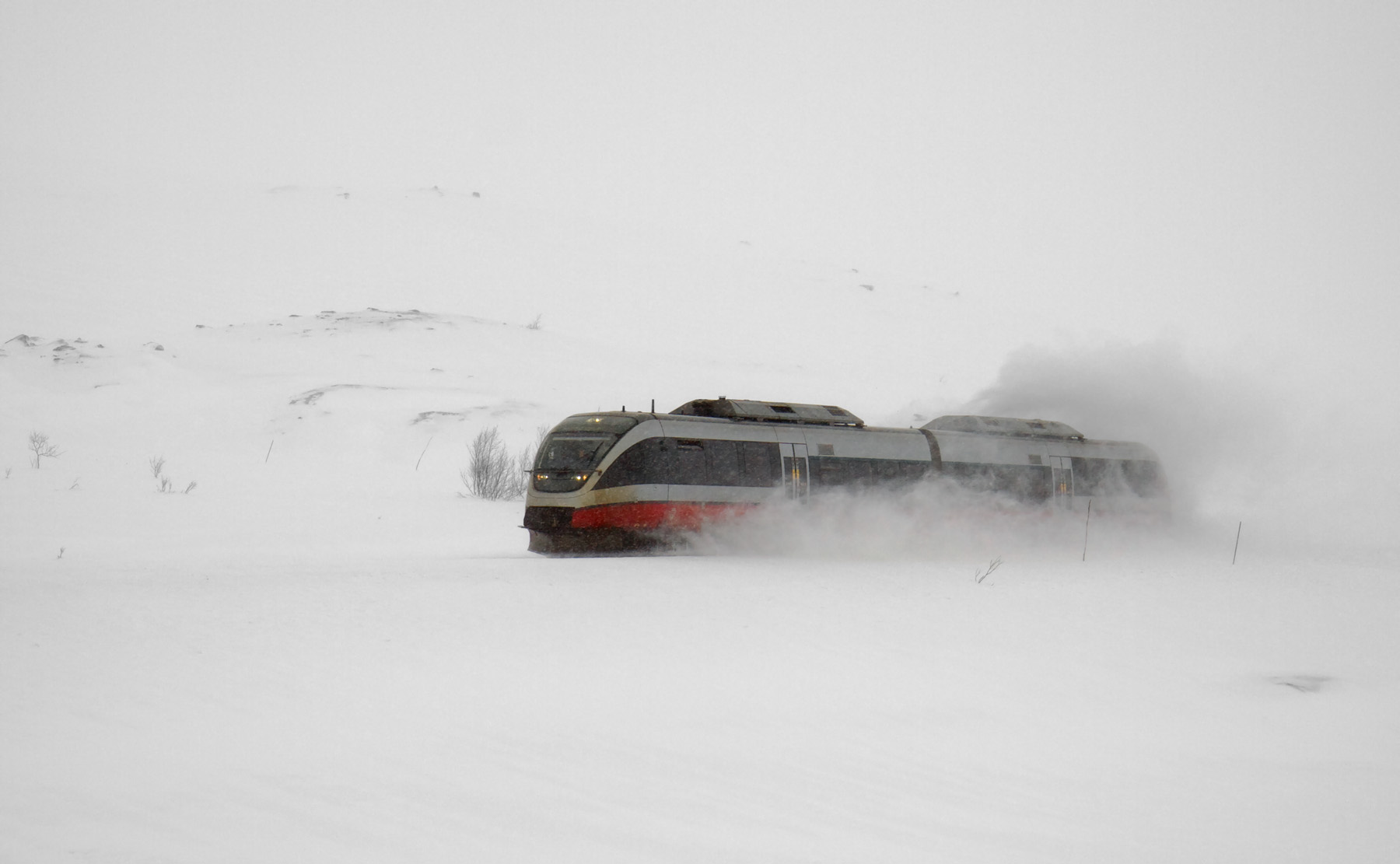
A Class 93 unit on the Nordland Line

During the mid-1990s, NSB had initiated a program to replace the traditional locomotive and carriage trains with new, tilting multiple units. This had led to the order of sixteen Class 73 four-car units for the three mainline routes on the Bergen, Dovre and Sørland Lines. To supplement this, on 14 November 1996 the board of NSB decided to purchase seven tilting diesel multiple units for the Røros and Rauma Lines. In particular, the aging Di3 locomotives would be retired within five years, and NSB was reluctant to purchase new diesel locomotives for passenger trains. The failure of the Di6, which were returned to the manufacturer Siemens, further motivated NSB to avoid locomotive-hauled trains.

Three bids were submitted by the deadline of 1 April 1997, and the contract with Talbot, which had just been bought by Bombardier, was finalized on 27 November 1997. By this time the order had been extended to eleven units, which are variations of the Talbot Talent. Before delivery a further four units were purchased, so the trains could operate all the services on the Nordland Line, replacing most of the locomotive-hauled day trains. Only the night train would remain locomotive-hauled.

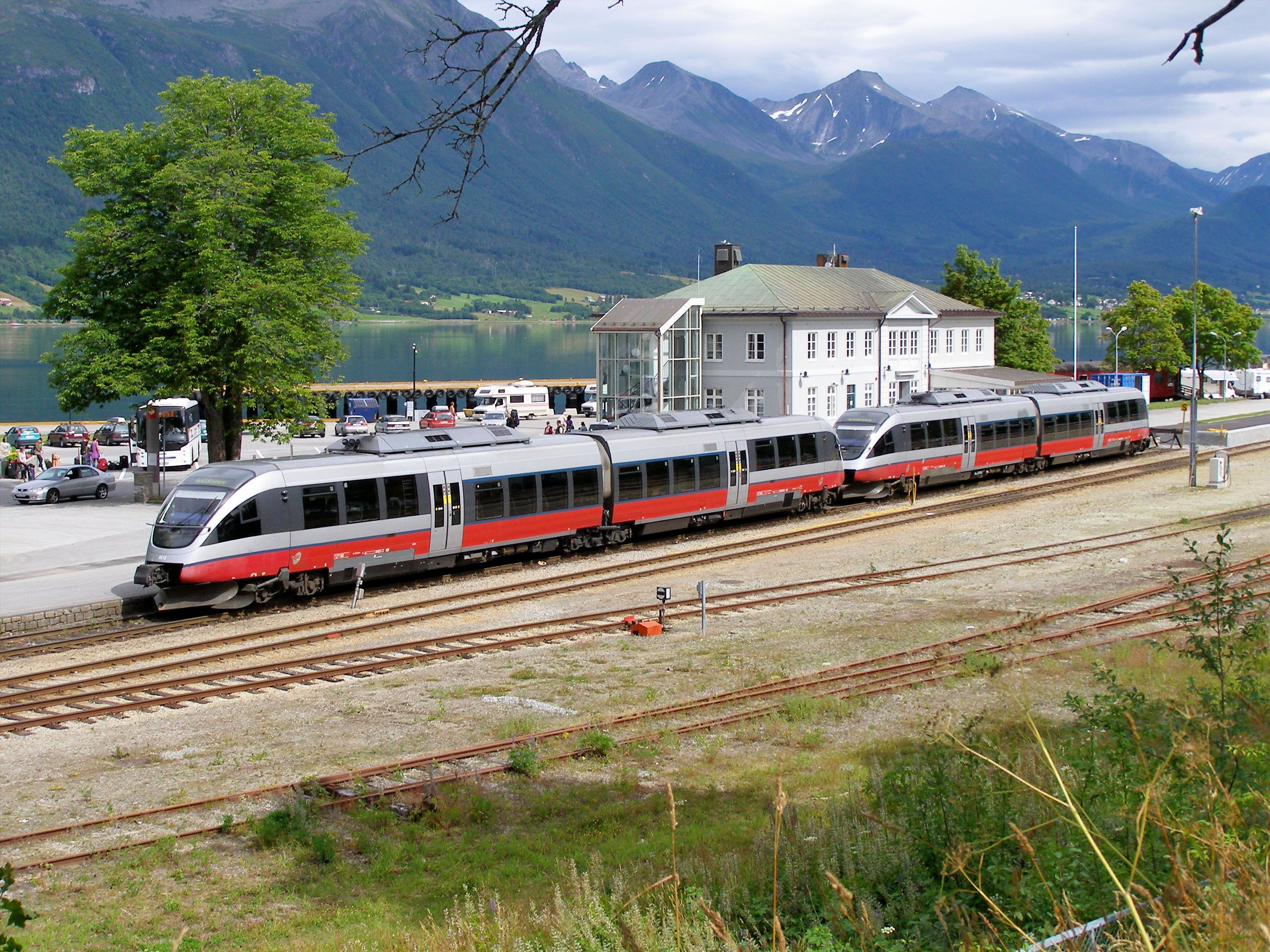
Twin Class 93 unit at Åndalsnes Station on the Rauma Line

The Class 93 was put into service as part of the Agenda regional train concept. Along with the Class 70 InterCity Express trains in Eastern Norway, the Class 93 would serve the regional services of NSB. Trains were initially put into service in 2000 on the Nordland Line, followed by the Rauma and Røros Line. The trains had several operational problems, some related to humidity, creating situations where both engines would stop. This caused NSB in 2002 to demand an interior and technical reconfiguration by Bombardier. One year after delivery, six of eleven trains were out of order. To solve the problem, NSB had to rent back used Di3 locomotives from Ofotbanen. NSB had chosen to sell the old locomotives for less than market price, but Ofotbanen demanded that NSB pay the entire purchase price for the short-term rental back. The brand name Agenda failed, since customers were dissatisfied with the new stock, and NSB chose to discontinue the branding, just calling all former Agenda and Signatur trains regional trains.

On the Rauma Line, the units are used as feeders between the Oslo–Trondheim express trains on the Dovre Line, connecting Dombås to Åndalsnes. On the Røros Line, the trains are used both on the Hamar–Røros and the Røros–Trondheim section. On the Nordland Line, the Class 93 serves both the Ole Tobias service between Trondheim and Mo i Rana. The unit was considered for use on the Meråker Line as well, but this has continued to be operated by Class 92 units. The initial plan was that eight of the eleven units were needed for daily operations. Four on the Røros Line, two on the Nordland Line and two on the Rauma Line. The additional four units were needed for operating the Trondheim–Bodø trains on the Nordland Line, of which three would be used at any one time. Double units (four cars) are sometimes operated on the Trondheim – Mo i Rana train, as are the Friday and Sunday afternoon trains on the Rauma Line, for exchange of equipment, and to handle the increased traffic on these days. In addition, NSB uses the trains on the commuter services Bodø–Fauske–Rognan and Mo i Rana–Mosjøen.

In 2007, the Trondheim–Bodø service was again operated by Di 4 locomotive-hauled trains. This is the longest rail service in the country, and customers were dissatisfied with the comfort of the Class 93, despite the higher permitted speeds.

During May and June 2012 all NSB Class 93 trains were fitted with free wireless Internet access for passengers

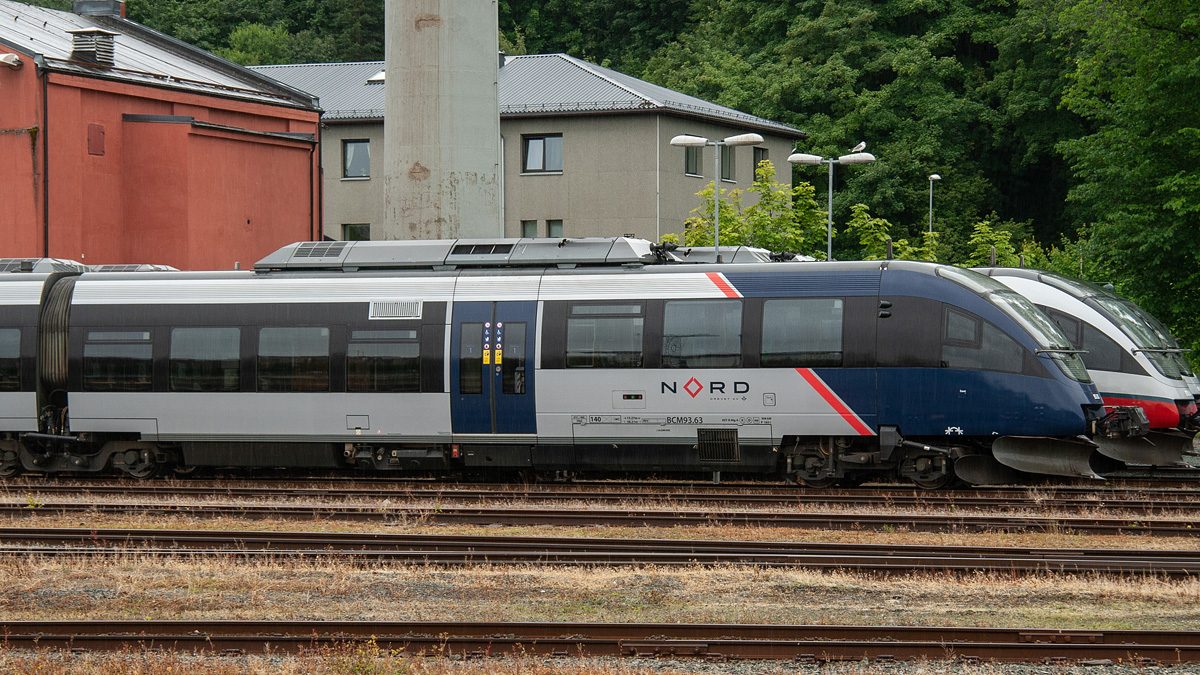
93-13 (BCM 93.63) of SJ Norge

In 2016 the trains changed to public owned Norske tog, that let rolling stock to public service operators. In a tendering process the network 2 north between Oslo and Bodø changed in June 2020 from the operator Vy to SJ Norge. The new operator rent 13 Class 93 from Norske tog AS to operating the network. For the eight-year contract the trains get a new Design with "Nord" branding.

In 2022 Norske Tog starting a tendering process for replacement or removal of tilting system. The operator have technical errors and lack of parts.

== Specifications ==
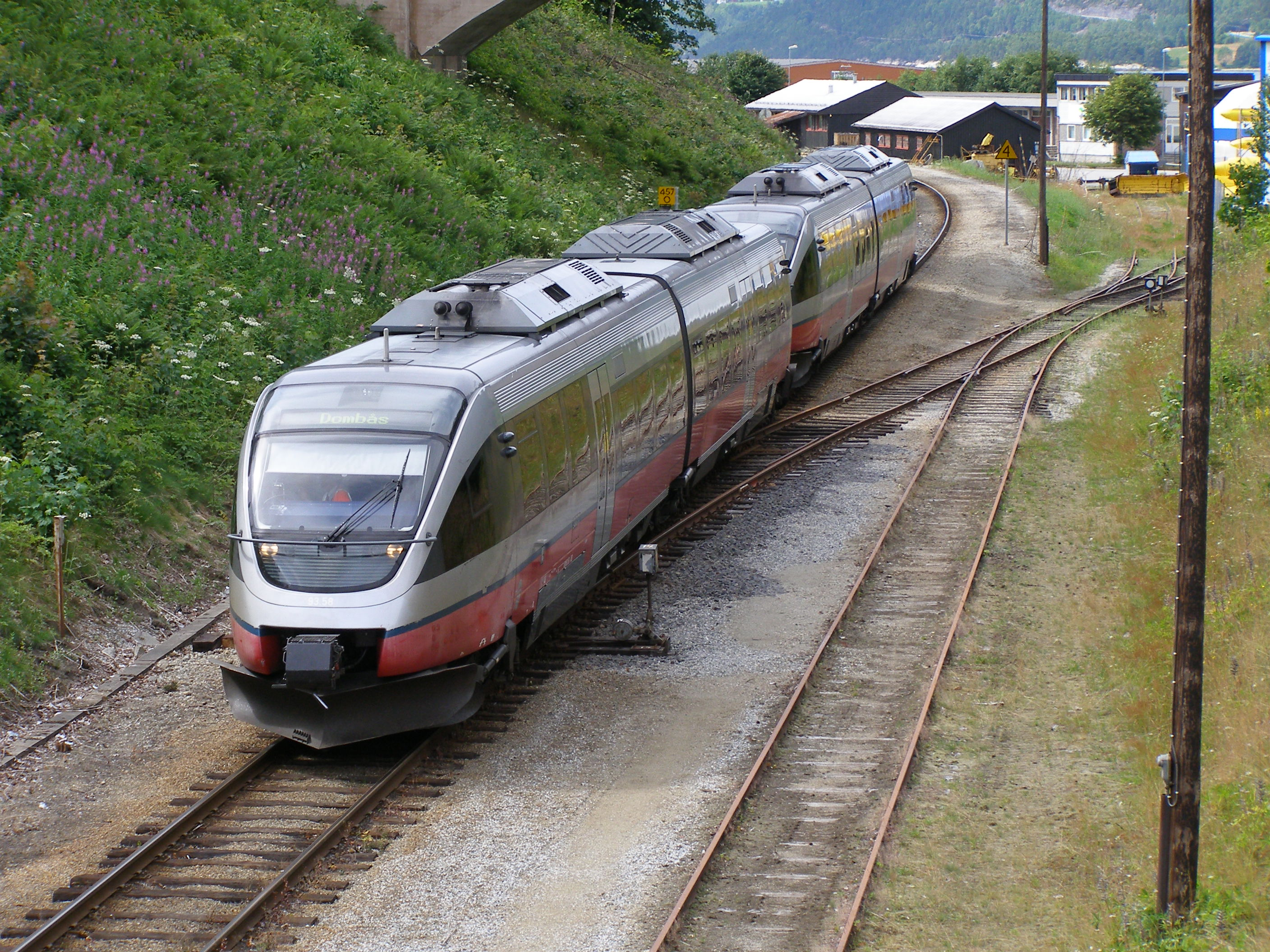
Class 93 train near Åndalsnes Station

The Class 93 is a double-car diesel multiple unit with a built-in tilting mechanism (called ContRoll by Bombardier) to allow faster speeds on conventional track. A double-car is 38.21 m (125 ft 4 in) long, 2.92 m (9 ft 7 in) wide and 3.97 m (13 ft 0 in) high. Empty weight is 77 t (76 long tons; 85 short tons). The body is built in modular stainless steel, with the bottom, sides and top bolted together.

There are two Cummins N14E-R diesel engines, with a combined power of 612 kW (821 hp). The displacement is 14 L (850 cu in); full power is achieved at 1,500 revolutions per minute. There is a five-stage gear box, and a fuel capacity of two tanks each of 1,140 L (250 imp gal). There are three bogies (sets of wheels), of which the ends are powered. Maximum speed is 140 km/h (87 mph). The tilting mechanism allows 5 degree tilting of the entire frame.

The interior is in red and wood. The central part, including both doors on each side, are on a low-floor section, while the area at the front is higher. The original seating configuration was for 88 seats, but due to customer complaints about lack of seat pitch, NSB has reconfigured the trains in 2006 to 76 seats. Trains are equipped with vending machines for simple refreshments. Garbage is recycled in three categories.
