= Arne Wam =

Norwegian journalist and civil servant (born 1952)

Arne Wam (born 14 April 1952) is a Norwegian journalist and civil servant, who has had several leading positions in the Norwegian Broadcasting Corporation (NRK) and the Norwegian State Railways (NSB).

== Early and personal life ==
He was born in Drammen, and was educated at Volda University College. He is married to Sissel Rønbeck.

== Career ==
During the 1980s, Wam worked as a negotiator between the Blitz group and the Oslo Municipality, resulting in the establishment of the Blitz House. During this period, Wam joined the Norwegian Labour Party and later became chair of Skøyen Labour Party. In 1986, Wam became anchor in Ungdommens Radioavis on NRK. Two years later, he led the Men's Role Committee, which criticized Norwegian women and equality policies.

On 28 June 1989, Wam leaked a news story about the connection between the Labour Party and the Norwegian Police Security Service. In 1990, Wam became leader of NRK Østlandssendingen. Five years later, he became the advisor for NRK's director-general Einar Førde. In 1996, he became director of NRK Aktivum, a limited company which operate an online store. Two years later, he quit that job in protest against lack of prioritizing on the concept, and received a golden parachute worth 500,000 Norwegian krone.

In 1999, Wam was hired as director for regional trains in NSB, and a year later became acting CEO of NSB. He replaced Randi Flesland, who had served as acting CEO for a short time after Osmund Ueland was fired. Wam stated that his inspiration for the company came from Telenor and Norway Post. Among his projects were removing 49 out of 300 employees at Lodalen without firing a single person; removing shopping trolleys from the trains and replacing them with vending machines; and welding the seats in older, bi-directional trains so the seats would no longer always face forward. In 2001, Wam was replaced by Einar Enger as CEO of NSB. In 2003 Wam became communications director for NSB.

Preceded by Randi Flesland (acting)	CEO of the Norwegian State Railways; 2000–2001 (acting)	Succeeded by Einar Enger
