= Håreina Station =

Railway station in Aurland, Norway

Håreina Station Håreina stasjon
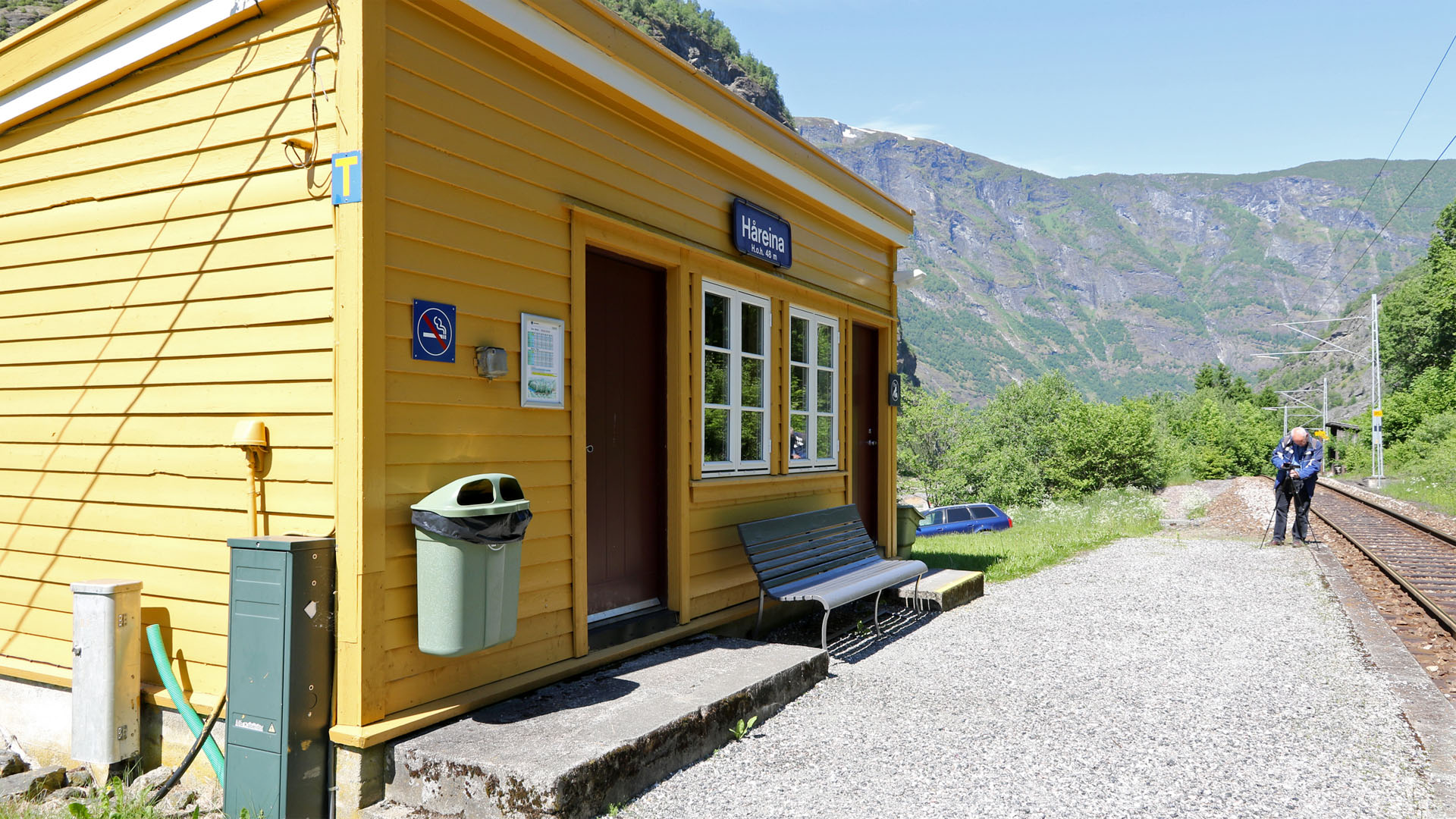
- View of the station

General information
- Location: Håreina, Aurland Municipality; Norway
- Coordinates: 60.83974°N 7.12272°E
- Elevation: 48 m (157 ft)
- System: Railway station
- Owner: Bane NOR
- Operator: Flåm Utvikling (Vy)
- Line: Flåmsbanen
- Distance: 353.01 km (219.35 mi)
- Platforms: 1

History
- Opened: 1 August 1940
Location

Håreina Station (Norwegian: Håreina holdeplass) is a railway station on the Flåm Line at Håreina in Aurland Municipality, Norway. It is located 17.21 kilometers (10.69 mi) from Myrdal Station, 353.01 kilometers (219.35 mi) from Oslo Central Station, and 48 meters (157 ft) above mean sea level. The station opened on 1 August 1940.

Preceding station		Following station
Lunden	Flåm Line	Dalsbotn
