= NSB Class 70 =

Class of four-carriage EMUs

Class 70
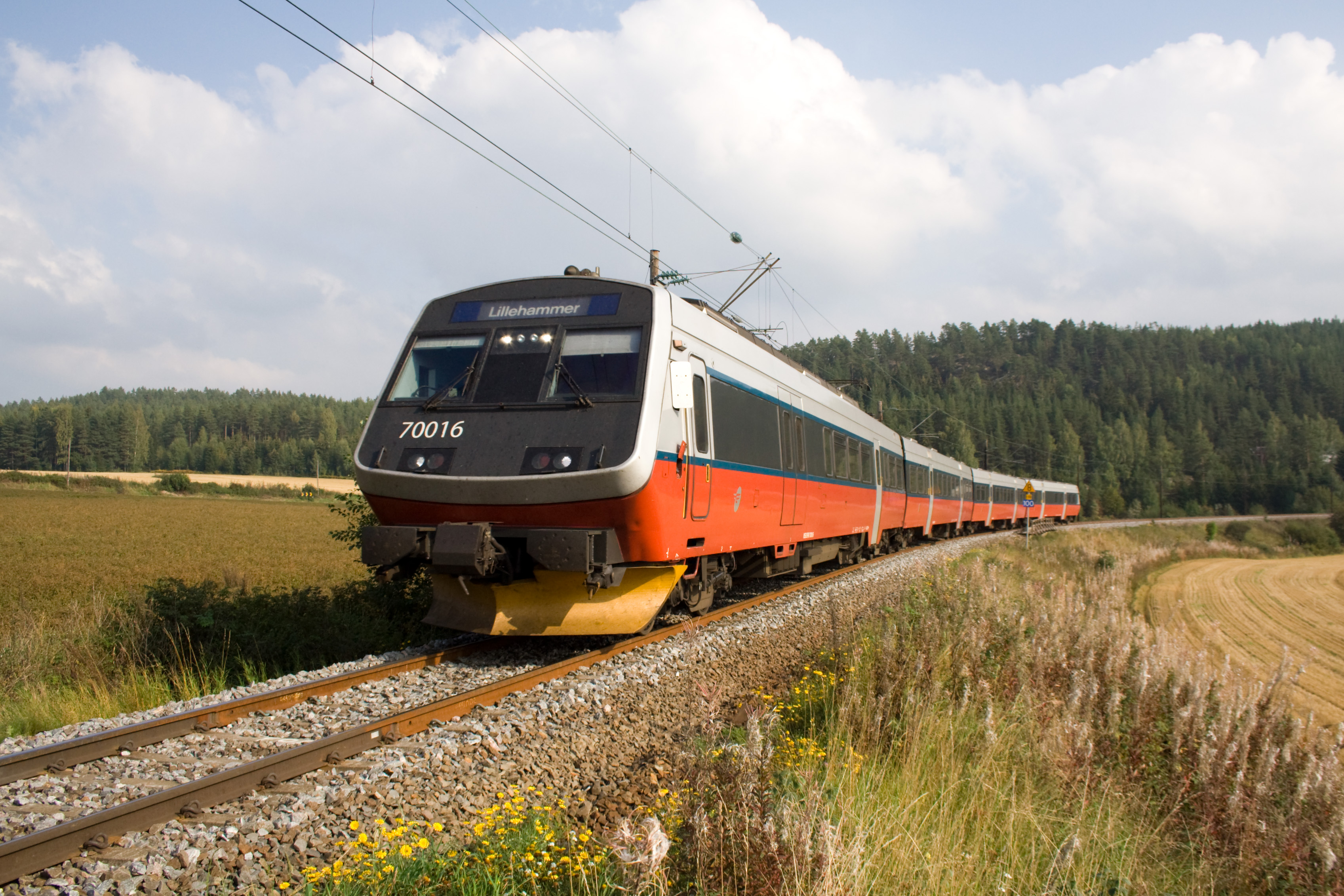
- NSB 70.016 near Tangen on the Dovre Line
- In service: 1992–present
- Manufacturers: Duewag, Adtranz and ASEA
- Number built: 16 units
- Formation: 4 cars
- Capacity: 30/31 business class (NSB Komfort); 200/201 second class
- Operator: Vy
- Lines served: Vestfold; Drammen; Gardermoen; Dovre

Specifications
- Train length: 107.65 m (353 ft 2 in)
- Maximum speed: 160 km/h (100 mph)
- Weight: 206 tonnes (203 long tons; 227 short tons)
- Electric system: 15 kV 16.7 Hz AC Catenary
- Current collection: Pantograph
- Track gauge: 1,435 mm (4 ft 8 1/2 in)

Class 70 (Norwegian: NSB type 70) is a four-carriage electric multiple unit operated by Vy on medium distance trains around Oslo. They are currently operating the express service between Oslo and Skien via the Asker, Drammen and Vestfold Line as well as on the regional service between Porsgrunn and Notodden on the Bratsberg Line.

== History ==
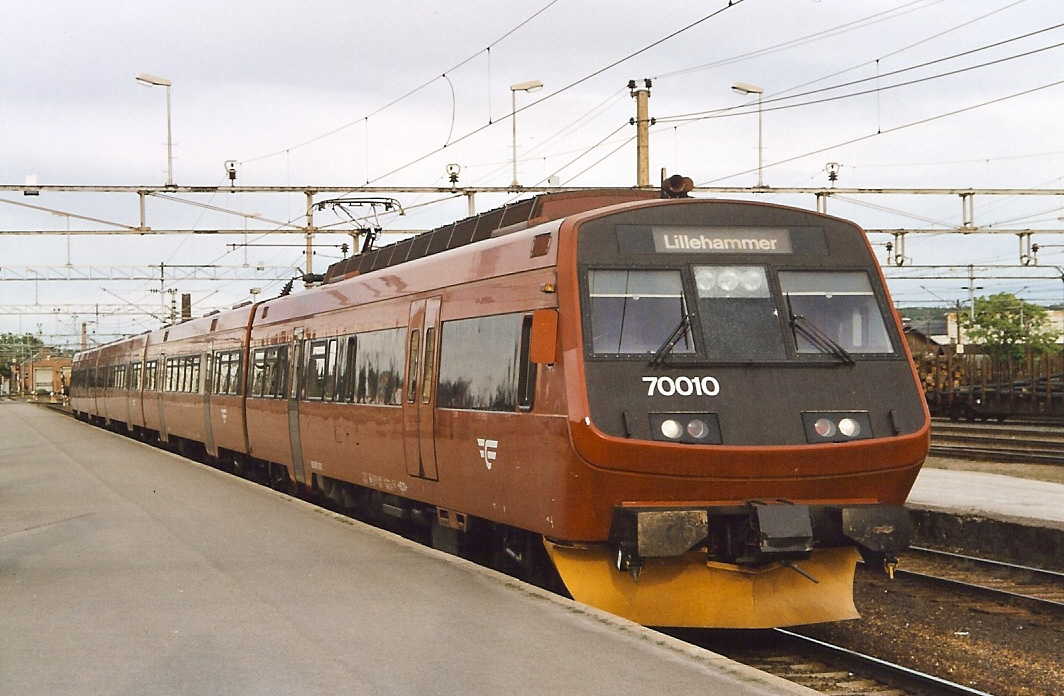
NSB 70.010 in the original color scheme at Hamar Station in 2001

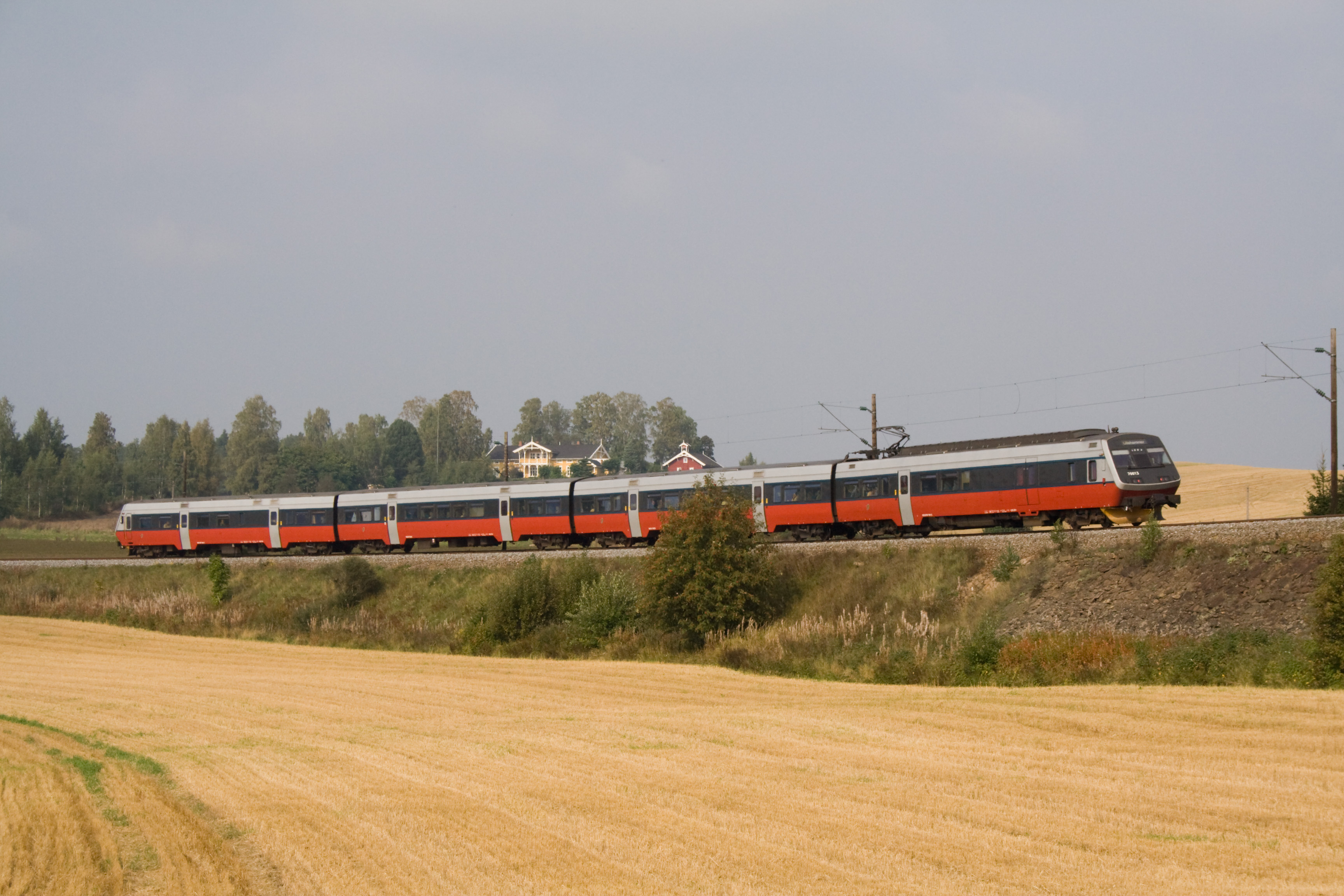
NSB 70.013 near Tangen on the Dovre Line

During the late 1980s and early 1990s NSB decided to change their focus to what could become a competitive advantage. Focus on long-distance travel would be undercut, and instead focus on medium distance trains, particularly around Oslo. This led to the NSB InterCity Express concept being launched, based on fixed, hourly frequency with upgraded service in new electric multiple units, using higher speeds than traditional trains, and with stops only in the larger towns and cities. The service was to be launched on the Østfold Line, the Vestfold Line and the Dovre Line to Lillehammer. The service could take advantage of new lines between Ski and Moss, and the Gardermoen Line to Eidsvoll. Some of the departures served by Class 70s are very early morning "red-eye" services used by people with a long commute to Oslo. Therefore, there is a quiet section on the train where mobile phones and loud conversation are banned.

The invitation for the bid was issued on 1 October 1986, and on 20 December 1988 NSB signed a contract with EB Strømmens Verksted concerning the delivery of nine new units. The first test runs were performed on 23 May 1992 on the Roa–Hønefoss Line. In 1992, NSB ordered additional three units, to be delivered in time for the 1994 Winter Olympics. An additional four units were delivered in 1996, making the grand total sixteen.

The trains have had a fair number of technical difficulties, and on the Vestfold Line they also were of an unsuitable size; the ideal size needed was six cars, while the fixed construction required the use of either four or eight cars. From 2000-02 the trains were converted from the InterCity Express concept to the NSB Agenda concept, but also this latter branding attempt has been discontinued, and the services are now part of the regional services provided by NSB. With the delivery of the Class 73, the Class 70 has been focused on the Skien–Lillehammer run, while the 73-units are used on the Østfold Line.

In 2010, Class 70 became the first Norwegian trains to be installed with wireless Internet, allowing passengers free access on the Lillehammer–Oslo–Skien route.

== Specifications ==
The units were built by Strømmen, with Duewag and ABB as suppliers. The chassis is built in aluminum, like the B7 passenger cars, and the units are capable of being multiple driven with the Class 69 and other types of trains. The original seating was either 226 or 243, rebuilt to 230 and 235 with the conversion to Agenda.
