= Vy =

Norwegian state-owned railway operator

Vygruppen AS

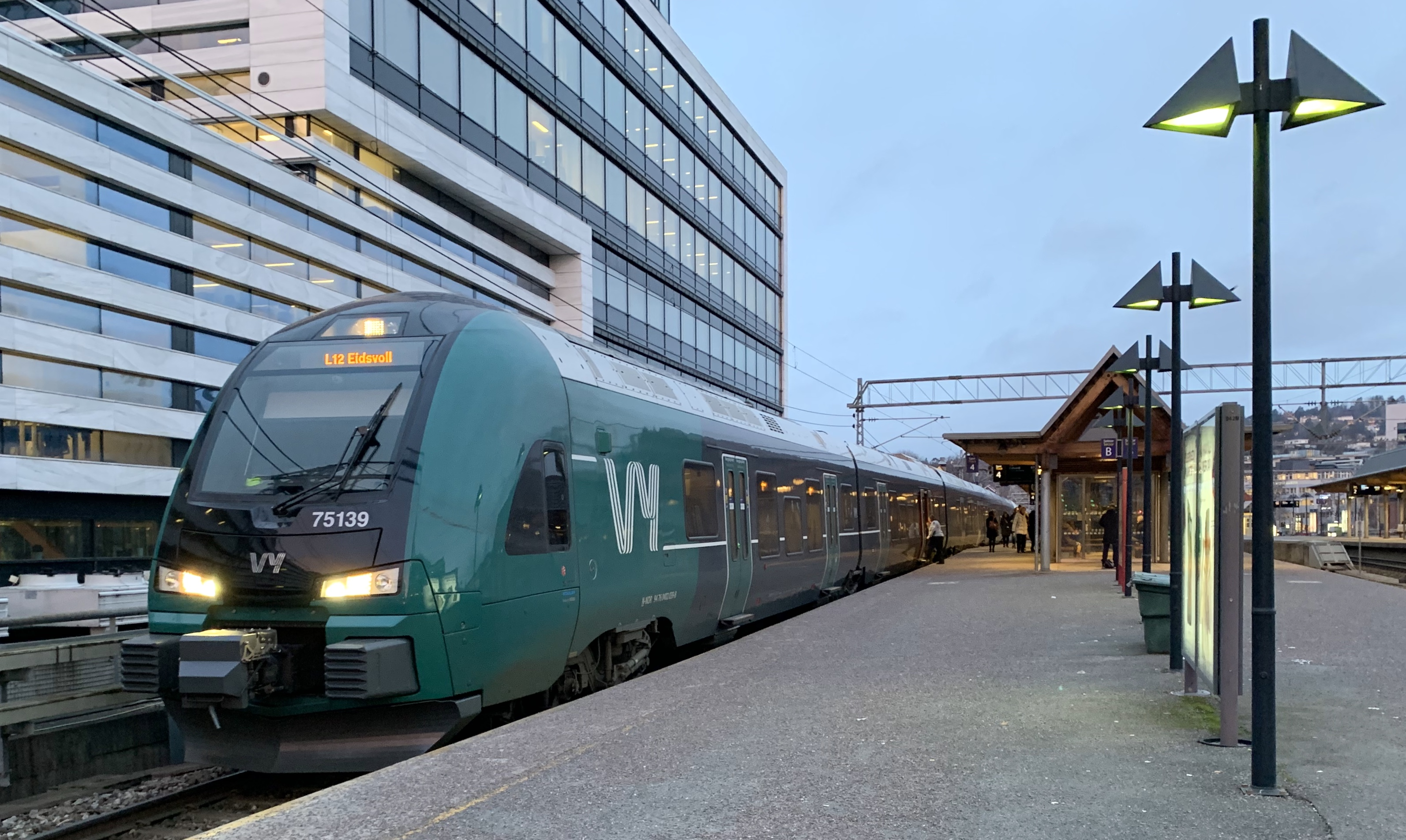
- Type: State-owned
- Industry: Transport
- Founded: 1 December 1996
- Headquarters: Oslo, Norway
- Area served: Norway and Sweden (Oslo-Gothenburg line)
- Key people: Gro Bakstad, CEO
- Revenue: NOK 11 billion (2009)
- Operating income: ▲NOK 548 million (2009)
- Net income: ▲NOK 497 million (2009)
- Number of employees: 10,646 (2006)
- Parent: Ministry of Transport and Communications
- Subsidiaries: Flytoget; Vy Buss; Vy Gjøvikbanen; Vy Tåg (Sweden); CargoNet
- Website: vy.no (Norway) vy.se (Sweden)

Vygruppen, branded as Vy, formerly Norwegian State Railways (Norwegian: Norges Statsbaner, NSB), is a government-owned railway company which operates most passenger train services and many bus services in Norway. The company is owned by the Norwegian Ministry of Transport. Its sub-brands include Vy Buss coach services, CargoNet freight trains and the Swedish train transport company Vy Tåg. In 2009, NSB carried 52 million train passengers and 104 million bus passengers. On 24 April 2019, passenger train and bus services were rebranded as Vy.

The company was originally established as Norwegian State Railways. In 1996 the company was split into the new NSB, an infrastructure company, Jernbaneverket and the Norwegian Railway Inspectorate. In 2002, freight operations were split to the subsidiary CargoNet, and the maintenance department became Mantena. It was controversially renamed Vygruppen in 2019; the then-opposition parties vowed to reverse the name change.

== History ==
Former NSB logo (2005–2019)

On 1 December 1996, the largest structural change in Norwegian railway history in the 20th century occurred. The old Norwegian State Railways was split into three separate governmental agencies. The ownership, maintenance and construction of the track was transformed to the newly created government agency Norwegian National Rail Administration while a new Norwegian Railway Inspectorate was created to supervise all railway operations in the country. NSB was renamed NSB BA and created as a limited company, wholly owned by the Ministry of Transport and Communications. Also, NSB was made a concern, with NSB Biltrafikk (now Vy Buss) and NSB Eiendom (later ROM Eiendom, in 2017 succeeded by Bane NOR Eiendom) made subsidiaries of NSB.

In 1998, the new Oslo Airport, Gardermoen opened, replacing the old Oslo Airport, Fornebu that had been too small since the 1980s. As part of the political compromise to build the new airport, NSB faced a dual mandate. On one hand, the imperative was to establish environmentally sustainable ground infrastructure, prompting the decision to construct a high-speed railway spanning 56-kilometre (35 mi) from Oslo Central Station to the airport, resulting in a 19-minute travel time. Concurrently, political stipulations dictated that the airport's development should not burden taxpayers financially; thus, the entire project was slated for financing through loans. The result was that the airport was to be financed, built and operated by the Civil Aviation Administration subsidiary Oslo Lufthavn AS while the rail connection was to be financed, built and operated by the NSB subsidiary NSB Gardermobanen. But problems arose during the construction of the Gardermoen Line because of a leak in the Romerike Tunnel, resulting in major budget overruns and a delay in the opening of the tunnel. Still, Norway's first high speed railway line opened on time on 8 October 1998 at the same time as the new airport, though the Romerike Tunnel was not opened until 22 October 1999, more than a year after its scheduled opening. The service is operated using 16 custom built Class 71 electric multiple units, with a capacity for 168 passengers and maximum speed of 210 km/h (130 mph).

NSB tried to modernize itself in the late 1990s through the acquisition of new rolling stock and a new brand image. The first stock to be delivered were 22 El 18 electric locomotives. These were meant to take over passenger train traffic in Southern Norway while the El 16s and El 14s were moved to the freight division and the El 17s were scrapped, relegated to shunting or sold to the Flåm Line. The new locomotives were capable of speeds up to 200 kilometres per hour (125 mph). For the diesel lines, NSB attempted to buy 12 Di 6 from Siemens, but had to return them after they failed to operate sufficiently in the northern Norwegian cold. NSB also decided to re-brand itself with three district brands: NSB Signatur (express trains), NSB Agenda (regional trains) and NSB Puls (local trains). At the same time, NSB ordered new electric multiple units, first of all for the new Airport Express Train service, Class 71. This was followed up with 16 new Signatur trains of Class 73 that were to be used on the express services on the Bergen Line, the Dovre Line and the Sørlandet Line and equipped with tilting technology. This was an attempt to create a high speed railway service using existing rail track, though the operating times between Oslo and the termini were only reduced by about 10 minutes. These trains were painted blue and grey, and were the first non-red trains to be operated by NSB in decades. At the same time, NSB announced the introduction of the Agenda concept, that was to replace the NSB InterCity Express services and the diesel services. While the Class 70s were simply repainted, the diesel services on the Nordland Line, the Rauma Line and the Røros Line were upgrades with 15 new Class 93 units in 2001, though criticized for lack of comfort, have increased the speed on the railways. NSB also discontinued night train services on the Rauma Line and Røros Line. Starting in 2002, NSB also received 36 new electrical local trains, Class 72. These were painted grey/green (for the use of the brand name Puls) and were put in the Oslo Commuter Rail and Jæren Commuter Rail. NSB has now discontinued the use of brand names on its rail products.

By 2002, the Bondevik's Second Cabinet wanted to further deregulate the Norwegian railway sector, and made NSB a limited company NSB AS on 1 July. NSB had been through a process of making the company more of a corporation, with the IT section made the subsidiary Arrive and the maintenance transformed to Mantena. NSB also purchased part of the Swedish Tågkompaniet while the old freight train section NSB Gods was transformed to CargoNet. 45% of the subsidiary was then sold to the Statens Järnvägar successor Green Cargo. In 2004, the government also split NSB Gardermobanen in two, deleting the companies debt, transferring the track it owned to Jernbaneverket and the train operations to a new, government-owned enterprise, the Airport Express Train.

On 24 April 2019, NSB was renamed Vygruppen and trades as Vy (a Scandinavian word meaning vision, outlook, overview or prospect). According to a survey by the Language Council of Norway, the name change was only supported by 7% of Norwegians.

== Services ==
Vy operates with three main types of passenger rail transport: intercity trains, regional trains and commuter trains.

=== Inter-city services ===
Long-haul electric passenger trains services are offered on the Bergen Line. The four day trains are operated with traditional locomotive hauled trains (electric locomotives El18 and coaches Class 7). A night train service with WLAB2 sleeping coaches is also offered on these lines.

=== Regional services ===
Vy has two regional rail services. All regional trains are to receive the new livery of red and grey. NSB has previously used the brand name Agenda on its regional services.

Regional services use Class 74 (R10 Skien–Lillehammer) and Class 73b (R20 Oslo S – Halden – (Gothenburg)). The service is provided hourly along the Trunk Line, the Vestfold Line and the Østfold Line. The trains running between Lillehammer and Skien serve Oslo Airport, Gardermoen, providing an alternative to the Airport Express Train.

- Bergen-Oslo (Bergen Line)
- Fauske- Narvik (NSB-Bus)- Stockholm (Train) (Sweden)
- Narvik-Tromsø (NSB-Bus)

=== Commuter services ===
Around the cities of Bergen, Oslo and Skien Vy operates commuter train services using Class 69, Class 72, Class 74 and Class 75 electric multiple units and Class 92 diesel multiple units. The services usually have hourly or semi-hourly frequency. NSB tried using the brand name Puls for the commuter trains, and have painted some of the trains green. The Puls brand has been discontinued.

The Oslo Commuter Rail provides the following services, with Class 69, Class 72 and Class 75:

- L1 (Spikkestad)–Asker–Oslo–Lillestrøm (Trunk Line )
- L12 Eidsvoll–Oslo–Drammen–Kongsberg (Trunk Line and Sørland Line)
- L13 Drammen–Skøyen–Oslo–Jessheim–Dal (Trunk Line and Drammen Line)
- L14 Asker–Lillestrøm–Årnes–Kongsvinger (Kongsvinger Line)
- L2 Stabekk–Oslo–Ski (Østfold Line)
- L21 Stabekk–Oslo–Moss (Østfold Line)
- L22 Skøyen–Oslo–Mysen–(Rakkestad) (Østfold Line)

Other commuter train services:

- The Bergen Commuter Rail: Bergen–Voss–Myrdal (Bergen Line) with Class 69
- Porsgrunn–Notodden (Bratsberg Line) with Y1 class railcar

In 2005, services on Gjøvik Line were transferred to NSB Gjøvikbanen (now Vy Gjøvikbanen) after the NSB subsidiary had won a public tender bid for a ten-year public service obligation contract with the Norwegian Ministry of Transportation and Communication. The Norwegian Minister of Transportation and Communications, Liv Signe Navarsete (Centre Party), has announced that the present government (as of 2006) will discontinue the previous government's announcements to put more rail line operations on public tender.

== Rolling stock ==
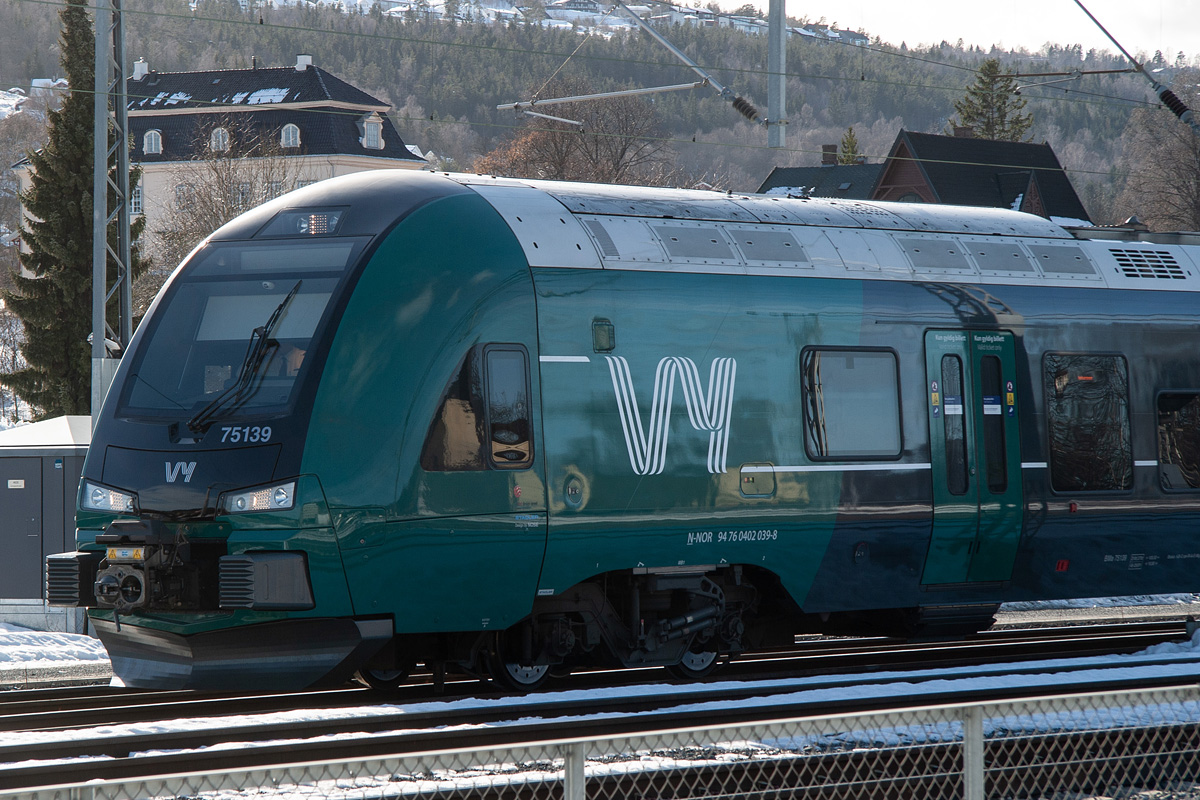
Class 75 local train in its current "Vy" livery

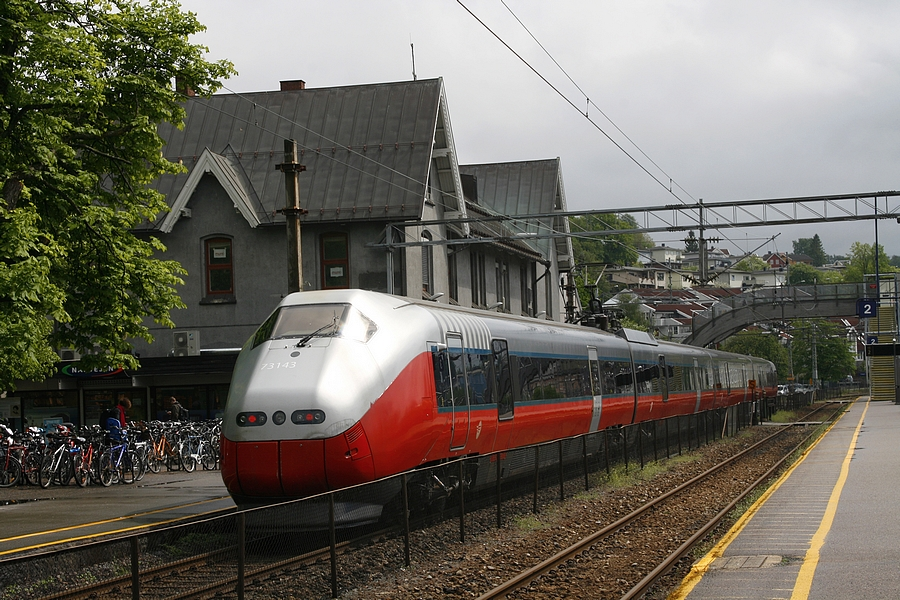
Class 73 long-distance train

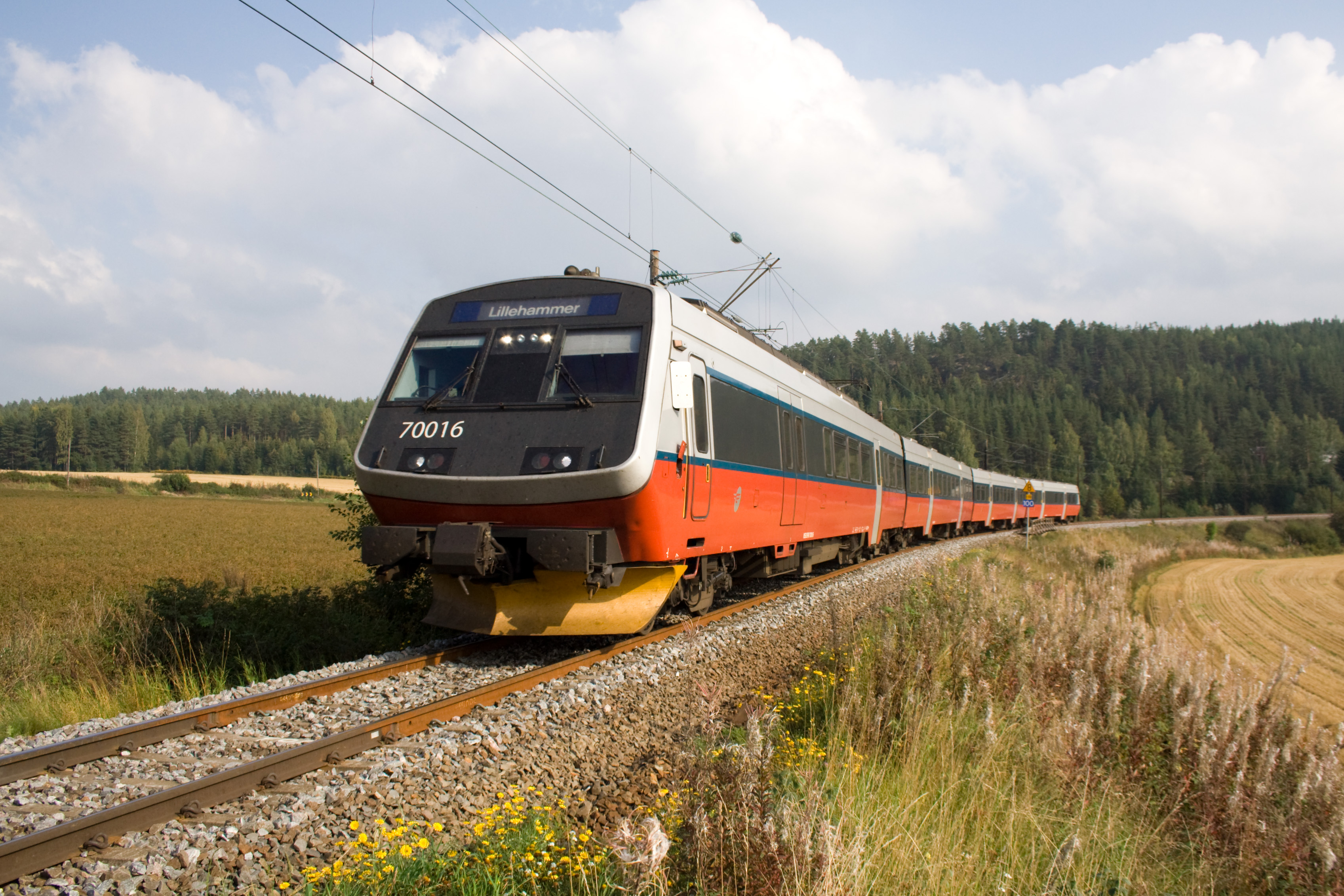
Class 70 long-distance train

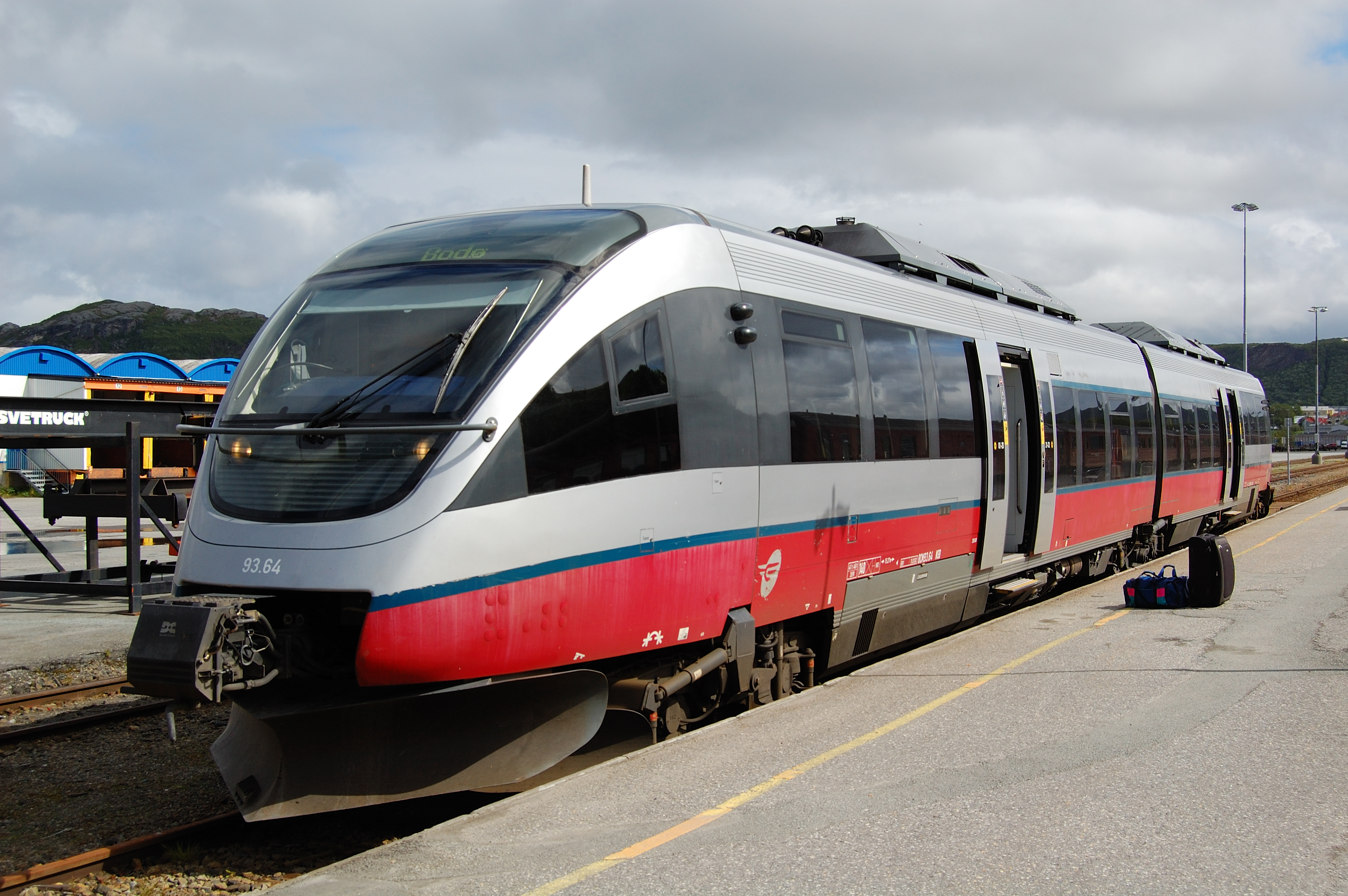
Class 93 local train

The Norwegian passenger train division has a fleet of 36 Class 72 and 82 Class 69 electric multiple units (EMU) and 14 Class 92 diesel multiple units (DMU) for commuter services. The company has a further 22 Class 73 and 16 Class 70 EMUs and Class 93 DMUs for regional and intercity trains, which are also provided by 22 El 18 and 5 Di 4 locomotives which haul Class 5 and Class 7 passenger cars. Vy receives subsidies to operate unprofitable route from its owner, while services on the Gjøvik Line have been made subject to public service obligations, which is operated by Vy's subsidiary Vy Gjøvikbanen.

During the 1990s, NSB modernized their rolling stock, expanding their fleet of multiple units and retiring many of the traditional locomotive-hauled trains. Most of the locomotives were sold to the freight company CargoNet AS, but the models El18 and Di4 remain to haul passenger trains. Some of the new trains were plagued with troubles, in particular a brand new Class 73 derailed at low speed at Nelaug in 2000 because of an axle breaking due to metal fatigue. As of 2005, however, these trains have been performing satisfactorily.

In August 2008, NSB announced it had ordered 50 new five-car electric multiple units of the Class 74 and 75. These will be used for local service in the Greater Oslo area (24 sets) and also regional service in southern Norway (26 sets). The delivery is scheduled for 2012 but delayed because of accident during testing, by that time much of the rail network is expected to be upgraded to double track, enabling an increase in frequency. The contract which is worth approximately 840 mill. Swiss francs gives NSB an option to buy an additional 100 sets. These trains have been specifically modified to operate in Norwegian climate and have a maximum speed of 200 km/h (125 mph).

=== Locomotives ===
- 22 El 18 class electric locomotives, used on all main electrified lines. The locomotive type is also used on The Flåm Railway (Formerly El17)

=== Electric multiple units ===
- 80 Class 69 class 2-car or 3-car commuter trains, used around Oslo and Bergen.
- 16 Class 70 class 4-car intercity (medium distance) trains, used around Oslo.
- 36 Class 72 class 4-car commuter trains, used around Oslo.
- 16 Class 73A class 4-car intercity trains, used for service in and out of Oslo.
- 6 Class 73B class 4-car regional version of the Class 73 used on Østfold Line.
- 50 Class 74 intercity trains and Class 75 commuter trains, based on the Stadler FLIRT has been introduced. With the first for profit operation on May 2, 2012.

=== Diesel railcar ===
- 3 Y1 used until 2015 on the Bratsberg Line between Skien and Notodden.

=== Carriages ===
- The non-motorized passenger carriages in operation are the B3-series (the oldest), B5-series and B7-series. The B5- and B7-series are in service on long distance express trains while the B3-series in green color are used in tourist trains on the Flåm Line (Myrdal-Flåm).

== Subsidiaries ==
Wholly owned:

- Arrive (IT services)
- Vy Buss (Bus operations)
- Vy Gjøvikbanen (Operates train services on the Gjøvik Line)
- Vy Tåg (Sweden)
- CargoNet AS

Majority owned:

- 55% of Trafikkservice, the other 45% owned by ISS (Cleaning services)

=== Vy Tog ===
Vy's subsidiary Vy Tog AS was on 9 December 2019 awarded the contract for all passenger trains on the Bergen Line by the Norwegian Railway Directorate, starting from December 2020. This includes long-distance trains F4 Oslo–Bergen, regional trains R40 Bergen–Voss–Myrdal and local trains L4 Bergen–Arna.

== Chief executives ==
- 1996–2000: Osmund Ueland
- 2000–2000: Randi Flesland (acting)
- 2000–2001: Arne Wam (acting)
- 2001–2011: Einar Enger
- 2011–2019: Geir Isaksen
- 2020–present: Gro Bakstad
