= Einar Enger =

Norwegian business executive

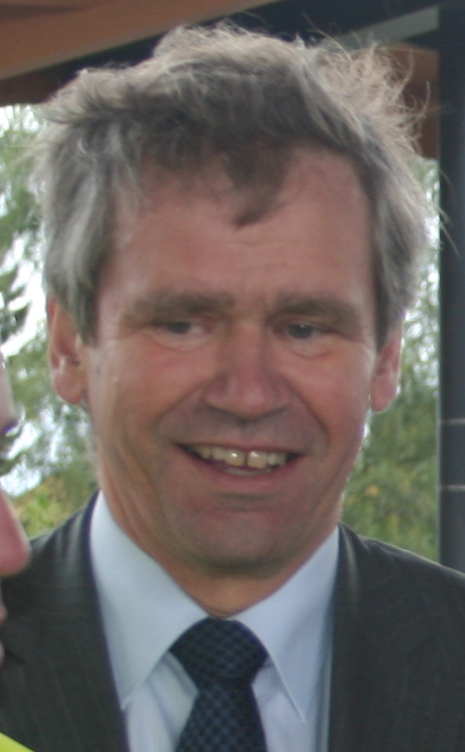
- Born: 16 August 1950 (age 75)
- Education: Norwegian College of Agriculture

Einar Enger (born 16 August 1950) is a Norwegian business executive who was chief executive officer of Norwegian State Railways from 2001 to 2011.

He was educated as an agrarian economist from the Norwegian College of Agriculture and worked for the agricultural cooperatives in Norway. He was the chief executive officer of Tine and Fellesmeieriet, as well as regional director and marketing director in Gilde Norsk Kjøtt. He was appointed chief executive officer of the Norwegian State Railways in 2001. He assumed office in March 2001, and took over after acting president Arne Wam, after several months of turbulence. In November 2010 he announced his intent to resign in early 2011. He left in May 2011, and was succeeded by acting executive Arne Fosen as the State Railways had not yet hired a successor.

Business positions
Preceded by Arne Wam (acting)	Chief executive of the Norwegian State Railways; 2001–2011	Succeeded by Arne Fosen (acting)
