= NSB Agenda =

Norwegian rail transport brand

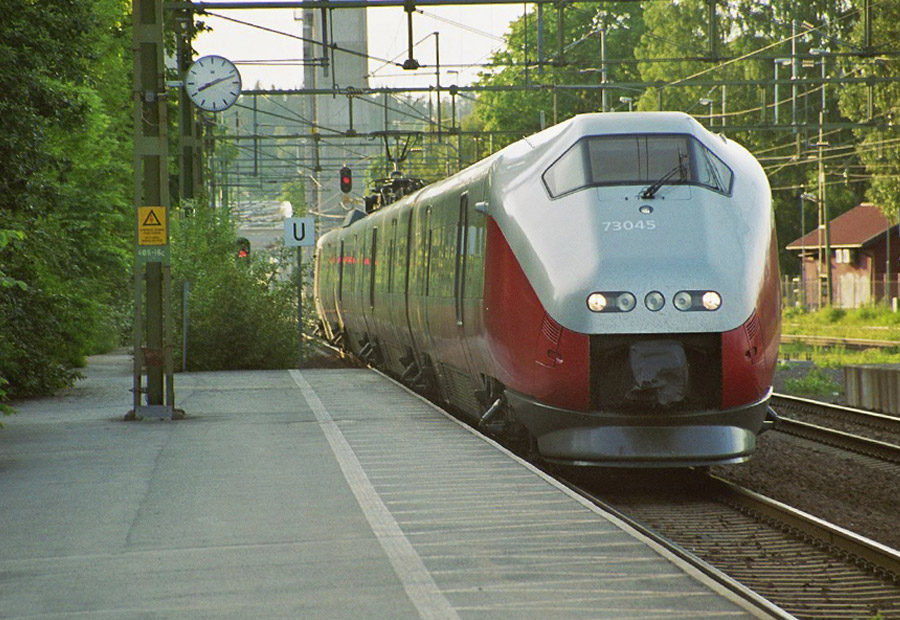
A BM 73b Agenda train at Trollhättan

NSB Agenda was a brand name created by Norges Statsbaner (NSB) for their regional train service, and used on the services in Eastern, Central and Northern Norway. Agenda trains were painted red and silver, and the brand name was in use between about 1999 and 2005.

== Background ==
NSB had since 1992 offered the premium InterCity Express (ICE) service on the Vestfold Line, the Østfold Line and the route to Lillehammer (along the Dovre Line and Hoved Line. With the delivery of the new multiple units BM 73b and BM 93 NSB chose to give them the common name Agenda at the same time the old units BM 70 that had served on the ICE routes.

The idea was to create a unified concept with three distinct products; the green Puls was the brand for local trains, the red Agenda for the regional trains and the blue Signatur for the express trains. NSB chose to paint the BM 92 and BM 69 multiple units in the Agenda color scheme, but has never allocated the brand name on them.

== Service ==
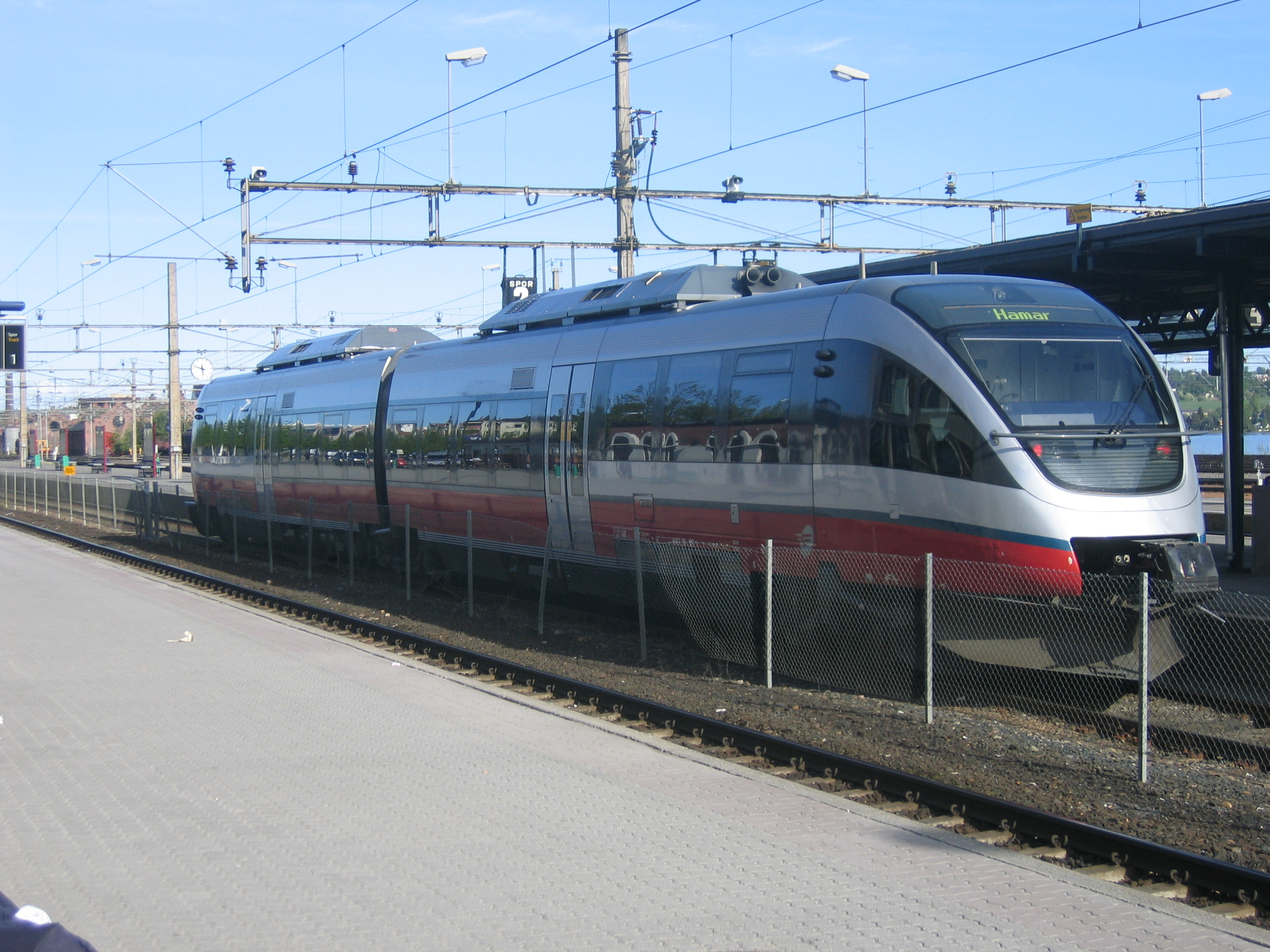
A BM 93 Agenda train at Hamar Station

The Agenda brand was used on the following routes:

- Skien – Oslo S – Lillehammer (BM 70)
- Oslo S – Halden – Gothenburg (BM 73b)
- Hamar – Røros – Trondheim S (BM 93)
- Dombås – Åndalsnes (BM 93)
- Trondheim S – Bodø (BM 93)
