= Arrive (company) =

Norwegian transport information company

Arrive AS
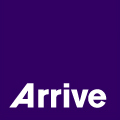
- Company type: Subsidiary
- Industry: Information technology
- Founded: 2001
- Defunct: 2012
- Headquarters: Oslo, Norway
- Area served: Norway
- Key people: Eyvind Ranvig (CEO)
- Revenue: ▲NOK 120 million (2005)
- Operating income: NOK 7.8 million (2005)
- Net income: NOK 5.5 million (2005)
- Number of employees: 70 (2007)
- Parent: Norges Statsbaner
- Website: www.arrive.no

Arrive was a Norwegian information technology company owned by Norges Statsbaner (Norwegian State Railways) that offers a wide range of Information Technology services, primarily targeting the railway and public transport sector, with the NSB corporation being the dominant customer. The company has 70 employees, is based in Oslo and was created in 2001 as a limited company, though had been a separate division within NSB since 1970.
