= NRK Aktivum =

NRK Aktivum is a wholly-owned subsidiary of the Norwegian Broadcasting Corporation (NRK) founded in 1997 to take care of its commercial activities. NRK Aktivum develops and sells products, services and rights based on NRK's program production and brands.

They offer DVDs, music, books, audiobooks, and licensed products from NRK's program archives, as well as ongoing production of television, radio and online. They also sell billboards to sponsor on television; they have an event department, as well as an offer to visitors to Marienlyst with a visitor center and guided tours.

The company has 25 employees as of 2012. In 2017, its revenue was approximately 110 million Norwegian kroner.
