= Mantena (company) =

Norwegian rolling stock maintenance company

Mantena AS
- Company type: Subsidiary
- Industry: Engineering
- Founded: 2002
- Headquarters: Oslo, Norway
- Area served: Scandinavia
- Number of employees: 900 (2007)

Mantena is a Norwegian rolling stock maintenance company owned by the Ministry of Trade, Industry and Fisheries. It has workshops at Grorud and Lodalen in Oslo, Marienborg in Trondheim as well as in Skien, Drammen, Stavanger and Oresund. In addition to NSB, customers include CargoNet, Kollektivtransportproduksjon, Ofotbanen, Green Cargo, Hector Rail and Tågkompaniet. The company was separated from NSB as a separate limited company in 2002. It has 900 employees and head offices in downtown Oslo. MiTrans, that performs rebuilding of rolling stock, is a wholly owned subsidiary of Mantena.
