= NSB Class 73 =

Class of 22 Norwegian electric multiple units

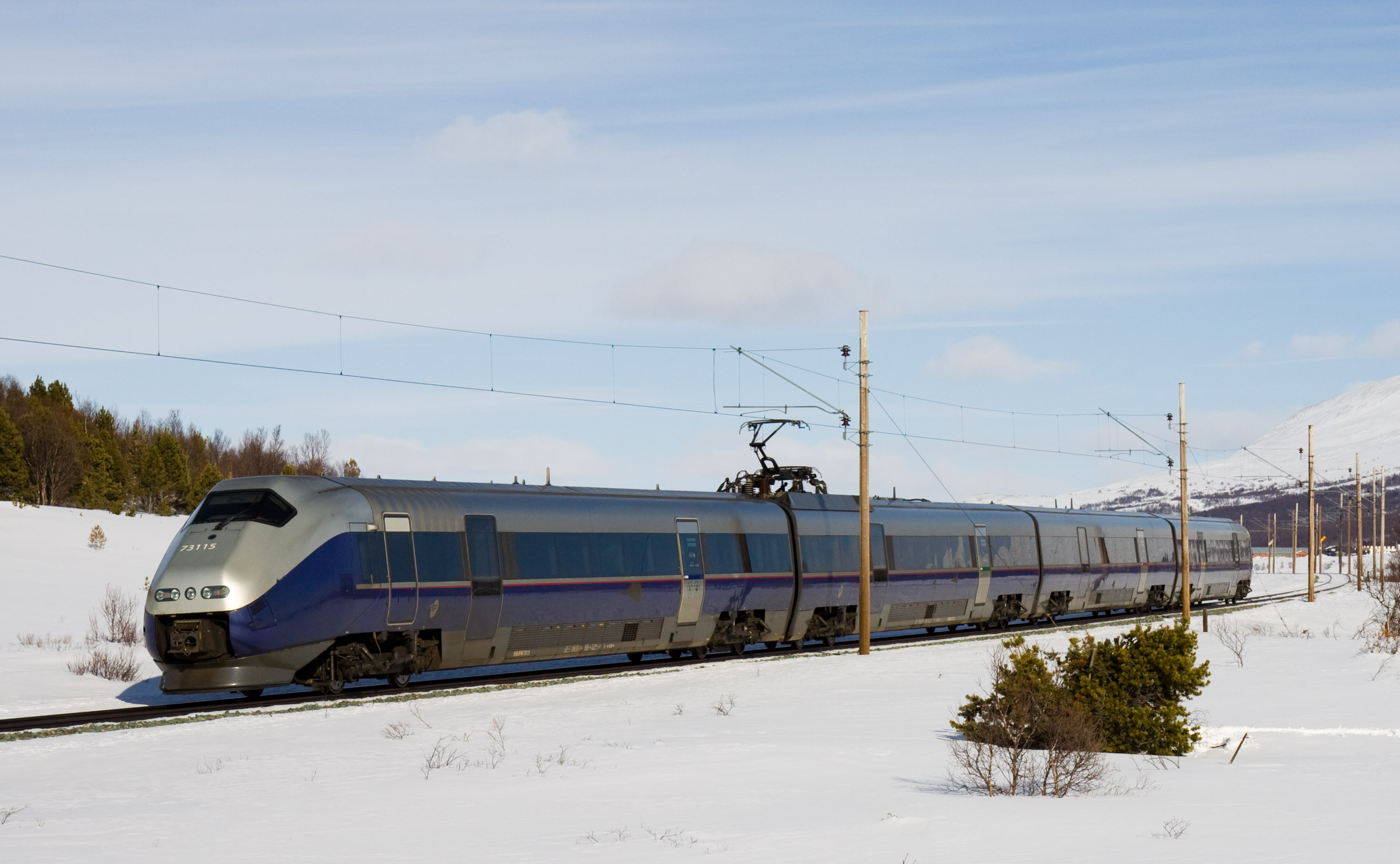
- Class 73 on the Dovre Line
- In service: 1999–present
- Manufacturers: Adtranz, Strømmen, ABB
- Number built: 16 units (A-series); 6 units (B-series)
- Capacity: 204 (A-series); 250 (B-series)
- Operators: Go-Ahead Norge; SJ Norge; Vy
- Lines served: Dovre Line; Sørland Line; Østfold Line (B-series)

Specifications
- Train length: 108.48 m (355 ft 11 in) (four cars)
- Maximum speed: 210 km/h (130 mph)
- Weight: 215 t (212 long tons; 237 short tons)
- Power output: 2,646 kW (3,548 hp)
- Electric system: 15 kV 16.7 Hz AC overhead catenary
- Current collection: Pantograph
- Track gauge: 1,435 mm (4 ft 8 1/2 in) standard gauge

NSB Class 73 (Norwegian: NSB-type 73) is a class of 22 electric multiple units built by Adtranz for the Norwegian State Railways. The four-car trains were modifications of Class 71, which was again based on the Swedish X2. The A-series consists of 16 intercity trains; they were delivered in 1999 and 2000 and are used on the Bergen, Dovre and Sørland Lines. The intercity service was branded as Signatur until 2003. The B-series consists of six regional trains delivered in 2002 and used on the Østfold Line. The regional trains were originally part of the Agenda concept. The trains have a power output of 2,646 kilowatts (3,548 hp) and a maximum speed of 210 km/h (130 mph). They have an overall length of 108 meters (354 ft) and have a capacity for 208 seated passengers in the A-series and 250 in the B-series. The trains have a tilting mechanism allowing for faster travel through curves.

The trains were delivered late, and were put into service after the Norwegian Railway Inspectorate had given dispensation from parts of the safety regulation. On 17 June 2000, a train derailed at Nelaug Station after an axle broke. The class was grounded for a month, and the investigation showed both design errors, and lack of proper inspection and testing. After they were put back into service, they were not allowed to use the tilting mechanism—thus not being allowed to run faster than their predecessors. The construction was reinforced, and in 2004, the tilting mechanism was re-enabled along with higher speeds. In 2007, a train derailed on the Bergen Line, and questions were raised about the trains' ability to operate in snow, however the accident report showed that the trains' front axle load was just as able to cope with heavy snow conditions as the locomotives running on the line, and that the derailment would have been more severe if the same conditions would hit a normal train with less secure connections between carriages. On 16 June 2011, two units were destroyed when the train ran into a fire in a snow tunnel at Hallingskeid Station.

== Specifications ==
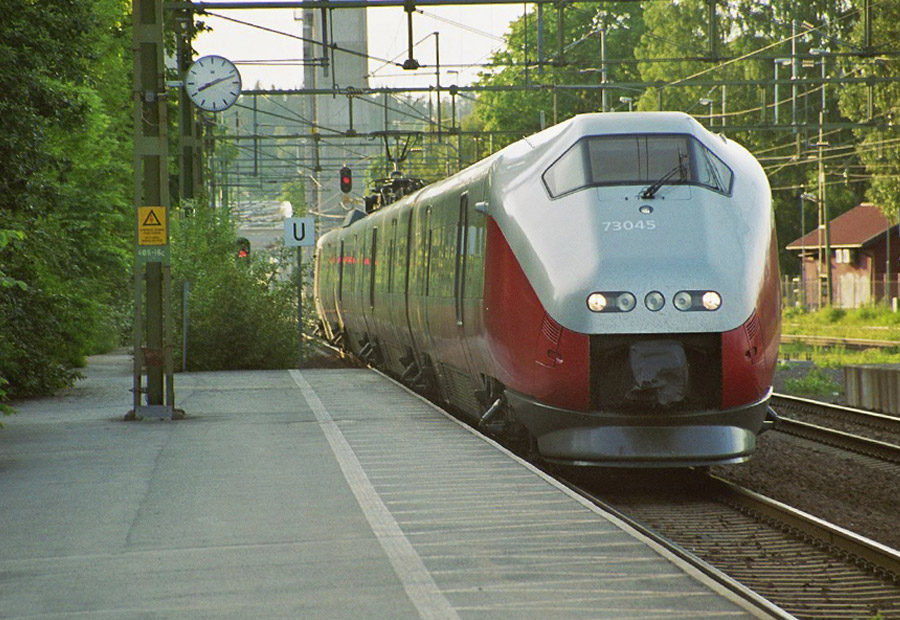
B-series train at Trollhättan Station on the Norway/Vänern Line in Sweden

Class 73 is a four-car electric multiple unit built by Adtranz. Each four-car train has eight bogies—of which three are powered—with a total power output of 2,646 kW (3,548 hp). The trains have active tilting, which allows speeds 20 to 30 percent higher than conventional trains through curves on conventional lines. Maximum permitted speed is 210 km/h (130 mph). A four-car train is 108.48 meters (355.9 ft) long; an A-series weighs 215.1 tonnes (211.7 long tons; 237.1 short tons) while a B-series unit weighs 216.1 tonnes (212.7 long tons; 238.2 short tons). The trains have a steel body and the entire cabin is pressurized. Rail brakes are installed on all carrying bogies.

The A-series has a capacity of 207 seated passengers, while the B-series has room for 250. The difference is due to the B-series having a smaller bistro and more compact seating. In the A-series, each of the four cars has seating in a different color (blue in BFM73 car, green in BMU73, red in BFR73, and yellow leather in BM73 and in the bistro area in BFR73). Originally, three of the cars had floors with carpet, while the fourth car (BFM73) had vinyl, of consideration to people with allergies. The carpets were removed in about 2005 as it was difficult to keep them clean. Seating is in two classes, standard and Komfort (originally "Plus"); the latter (BM73 car) with leather seating and power supply for laptops. All the cars have cherry tree wood interior. The trains are equipped with a dining section (BFR73 car) and warm meals can be served at the seat or in the diner. The menu is according to the time of day, with breakfasts in the morning and larger meals in the afternoon and evening. The trains also feature a family section with a play area and HC area (BFM73 car). The BFM73 car has also a bicycle room behind the driver's cab. From 2011, the trains are equipped with free wireless Internet.

== History ==
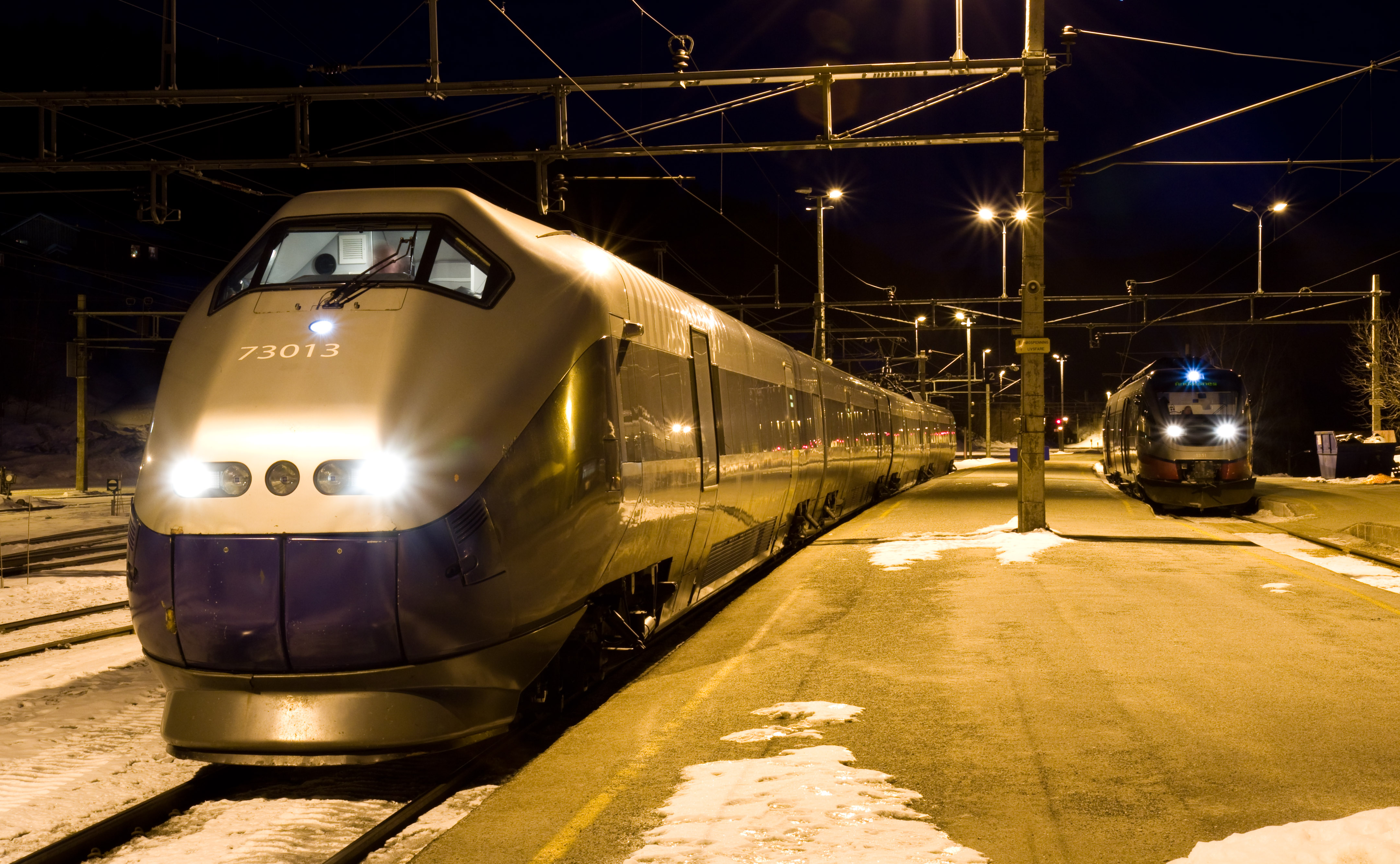
Class 73A (left) and Class 93 train at Dombås Station

=== Background ===
NSB published two reports (one in 1990 and the other in 1994) regarding the future of intercity rail transport in Norway. The reports concluded that there would have to be invested 56 billion Norwegian krone (NOK) in new infrastructure if the main corridors were to be built as high-speed railways. Instead, the use of tilting technology was proposed to allow higher speeds on existing lines. In 1992, the Parliament of Norway voted to build Oslo Airport, Gardermoen and connect it to the capital with the high-speed Gardermoen Line. It was decided that the service should take 19 minutes—and not one minute more. When issuing invitations to tenders, NSB specified this time limit as a criterion, which was also the reason the line was dimensioned for 210 km/h (130 mph).

Proposals had been made for NSB to purchase the same units as the Swedish State Railways (SJ), the X2, in a Nordic cooperation to use the same trains in Norway, Sweden and Denmark, but the idea was abandoned. In 1994, NSB launched plans to build 200 kilometers (120 mi) of high-speed railways by 2011, but also these plans were shelved. In May 1995, Osmund Ueland was hired as director-general of NSB, and he scrapped all plans to build new railways, and instead decided to focus on tilting technology.

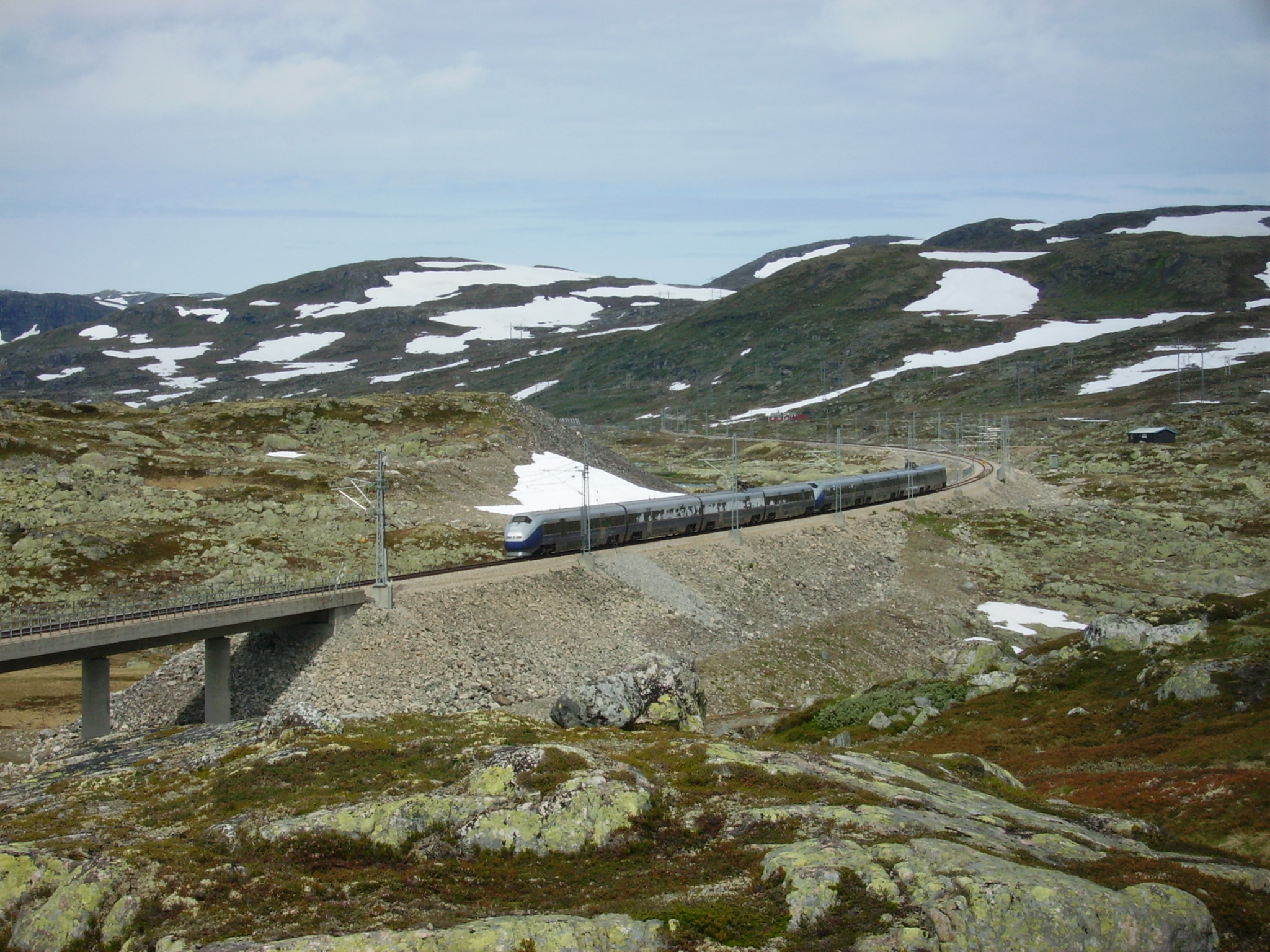
Twin unit at Finse on the Bergen Line

Class 71 and 73 are based on the Swedish X2, built by Kalmar Verkstad (KVAB) for the Swedish State Railways, and introduced in 1990. Carbody is built of stainless steel. Forty-three units were delivered by 1997; they each considered of a locomotive and two to five unpowered carriages, including a driving trailer. The locomotives had a power output of 3,260 kW (4,370 hp) and a top speed of 200 km/h (125 mph). Compared to X2, Class 73 has an upgraded bogie construction and motors in multiple cars instead of having a locomotive unit. The latter forces a four-car configuration, but allows for better traction and better use of space and weight by placing the technical equipment throughout all four cars.

In 1993, NSB test-ran an X2 train on the Randsfjord Line, and between 29 September and 21 December 1996, ran a unit in regular service on the Sørland Line. On 23 February 1995, NSB signed a contract to purchase 16 Class 71 trains for use on the Airport Express Train on the Gardermoen Line. The contract included two options, one for 16 trains for intercity traffic and one for 6 trains for regional traffic. The reason for using the same type of train as the Airport Express Train, was to reduce maintenance and operation costs through having a unified fleet. The options would only modify the trains slightly; they were primarily designed for the airport service and any optimization for intercity and tilting technology was secondary in the design process. The first option was taken out on 5 March 1997.

The differences between Class 71 and 73 is that the latter has a different interior, four instead of three cars, different door design, the removal of one set of doors per car and the addition of tilting. At the time of ordering, it was announced that the trains would enter service on the Sørland Line during the summer of 1999, the Dovre Line during the fall of 1999, and the Bergen Line during the fall of 2000. Class 71 was delivered in 1997 and 1998; one of the units was delivered with tilting technology to test it out—and subsequently removed. The first batch of trains cost NOK 1.6 billion.

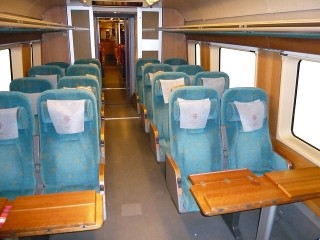
Interior

In April 1999, NSB launched a new branding scheme for their trains. In addition to Puls for local trains and Agenda for regional trains, the Signatur ("Signature") concept was introduced for intercity trains. Signatur would only be used on the Class 73 services, and consist of two classes, Comfort and Comfort Plus. NSB abolished its branding of only having red trains, and introduced a blue and silver livery on the Class 73 trains. The new service had fewer stops and faster travel times. To take advantage of the faster speeds, the Norwegian National Rail Administration needed to do upgrades to the track, overhead wires and signaling for NOK 1.2 billion.

Tickets on the Signatur service cost NOK 25 more than with conventional trains, which would continue to run. Tickets were also made available via Amadeus, a ticket reservation system in Norway previously only used for airlines. Prices became differentiated, with prices between Oslo and Kristiansand varying between NOK 250 and 780, depending on time of travel and class. NSB stated that they hoped to compete with airlines between the two cities, as travel time from city center to center was about the same as by plane.

=== Entry into service ===
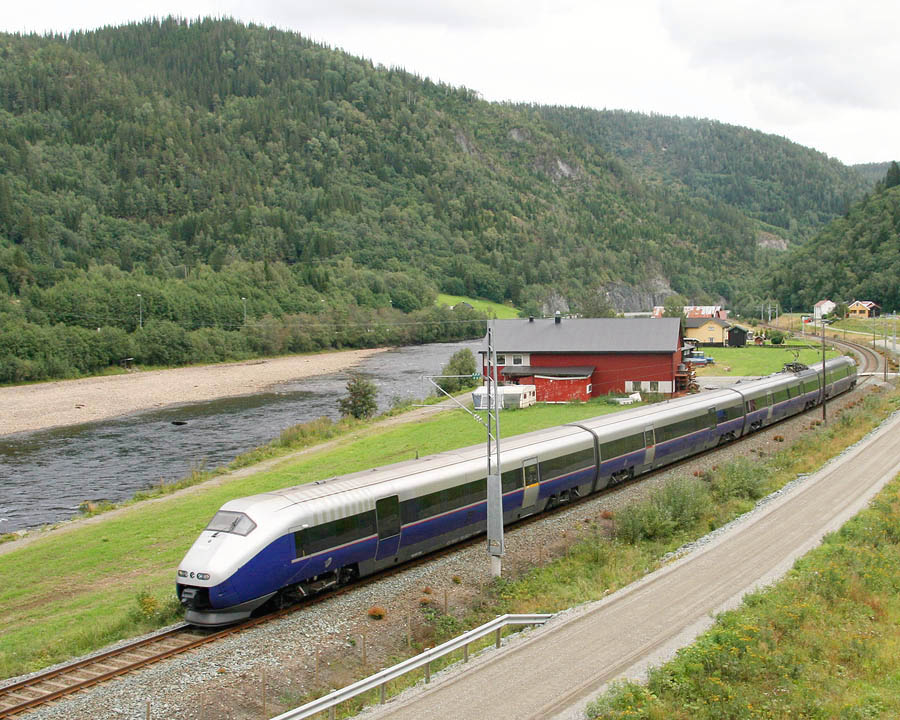
An A-series north of Støren on the Dovre Line

Three days before scheduled services were to start, permission to use the trains had still not been granted by the Norwegian Railway Inspectorate. The inspectorate had a series of safety concerns, including follow-up on the safety terms for the wheels and axles; lack of documentation of the crew's training; denying NSB's request to have fewer inspections and less maintenance on the trains; lack of consideration of critical events deemed to have a high probability to occur but have a low consequence; lack of a safety inspector for operations and maintenance; and that the trains were so heavy that they would exceed the permitted axle load of the lines. Det Norske Veritas (DNV) warned against a possible weakness in the axles. NSB wanted to use an expert from Deutsche Bahn to perform the necessary tests, but limited availability of the expert resulted in the Norwegian National Rail Administration granting a half-year delay of the inspections.

On 28 October 1999, Minister of Transport Dag Jostein Fjærvoll asked the directors of the three involved parties, Osmund Ueland of NSB, Sverre Quale of the inspectorate and Steinar Killi of the National Rail Administration, to meet at his office the following day if the issue was not resolved. The following day, the inspectorate gave permission for the trains to be taken into use, despite noting a series of non-conformities with safety regulations: the inspectorate lacked a list of the train's deviations from the safety regulations; lack of a system to automatically monitor the speed of the trains, particularly when automatic train stop was disconnected; lack of safety training for the crew; lack of an evacuation analysis; and lack of control of the marking of safety equipment. Most of the deviations were to be followed up within two weeks. Quale stated that the deviated issues were of a nature which had not previously been applied to trains and that it was therefore not critical.

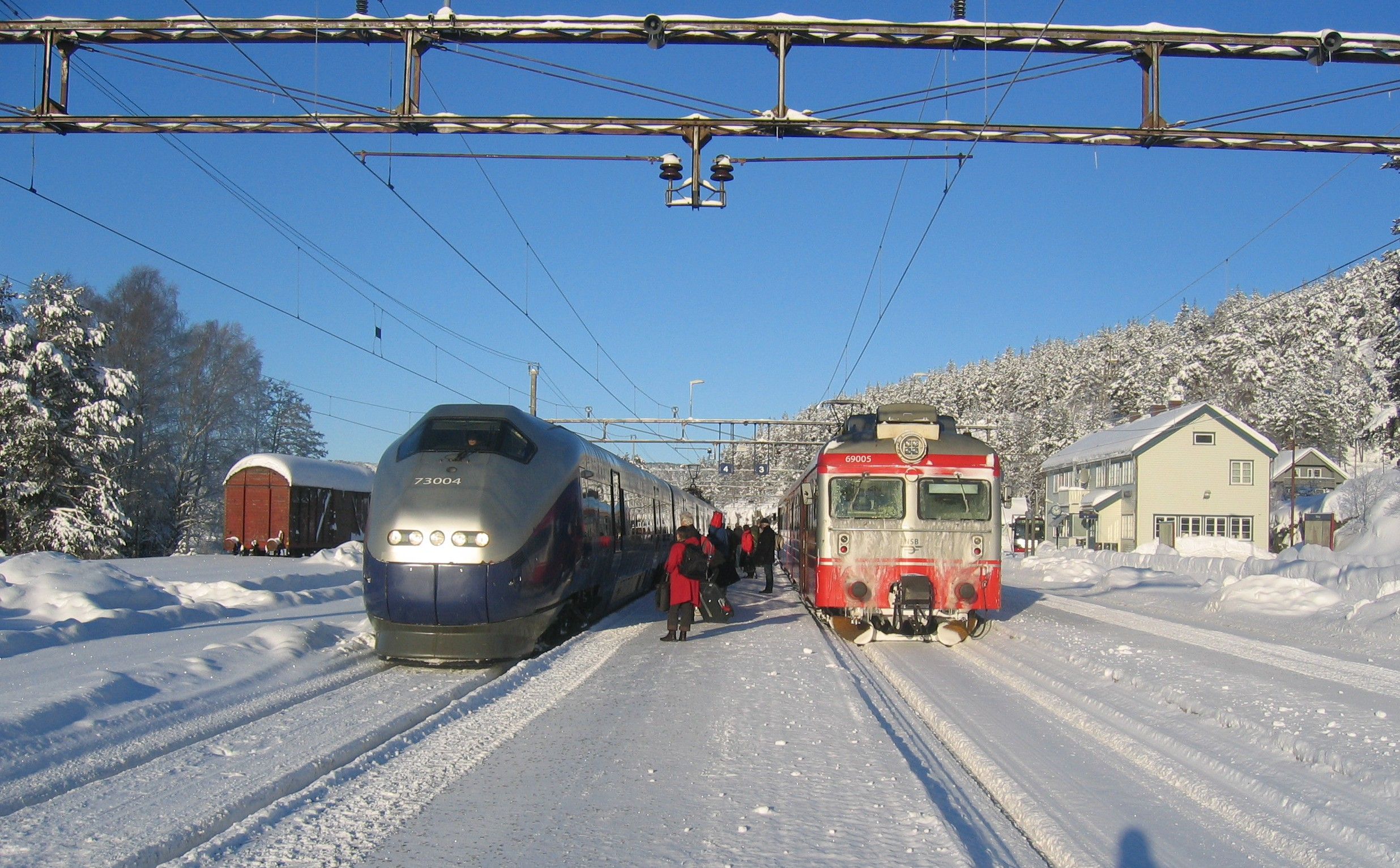
An A-series Class 73 (left) and a Class 69 train at Nelaug Station.

The first train was delivered on 22 October and was put into use on the Sørland Line from 1 November. Scheduled travel time was reduced by 40 minutes to 3 hours and 40 minutes. In December, the trains had problems with the pantographs not working correctly in cold weather, causing the trains to lose power and be several hours delayed. NSB stated that a contributing cause was the previous year's mild winter, which made it impossible to test the trains in extreme weather. After two and a half months of operation on the Sørland Line, every other train was at least 5 minutes late and every tenth train at least 20 minutes late. The trains also caused travel sickness, also among employees, particularly on the section from Kristiansand to Bø. NSB stated that this had also occurred on the old trains and that it was reports of the number of people affected were exaggerated.

On 16 December 1999, NSB confirmed the option for another six Class 73 trains, costing NOK 680 million, for use on the Østfold Line. On 7 January 2000, the trains were put into service on the Dovre Line between Oslo and Trondheim, and on the Sørland Line between Kristiansand and Stavanger. The travel time from Trondheim to Oslo was 5 hours and 46 minutes. In an independent marketing survey, Signatur customers were more satisfied than the customers for the two main airlines, Braathens and Scandinavian Airlines, but the train service had a lower reputation than the airlines. By May, the number of passengers on the Sørland Line had fallen by 10 percent. The reason was the limited capacity during the weekends; while NSB had previously run trains with 400 to 500 seats, Class 73 had considerably less capacity. Additional services were introduced on the Dovre Line from 11 June 2000, while the introduction on the Bergen Line was delayed because the infrastructure upgrades on the Bergen Line were not yet completed.

=== Axle faults ===
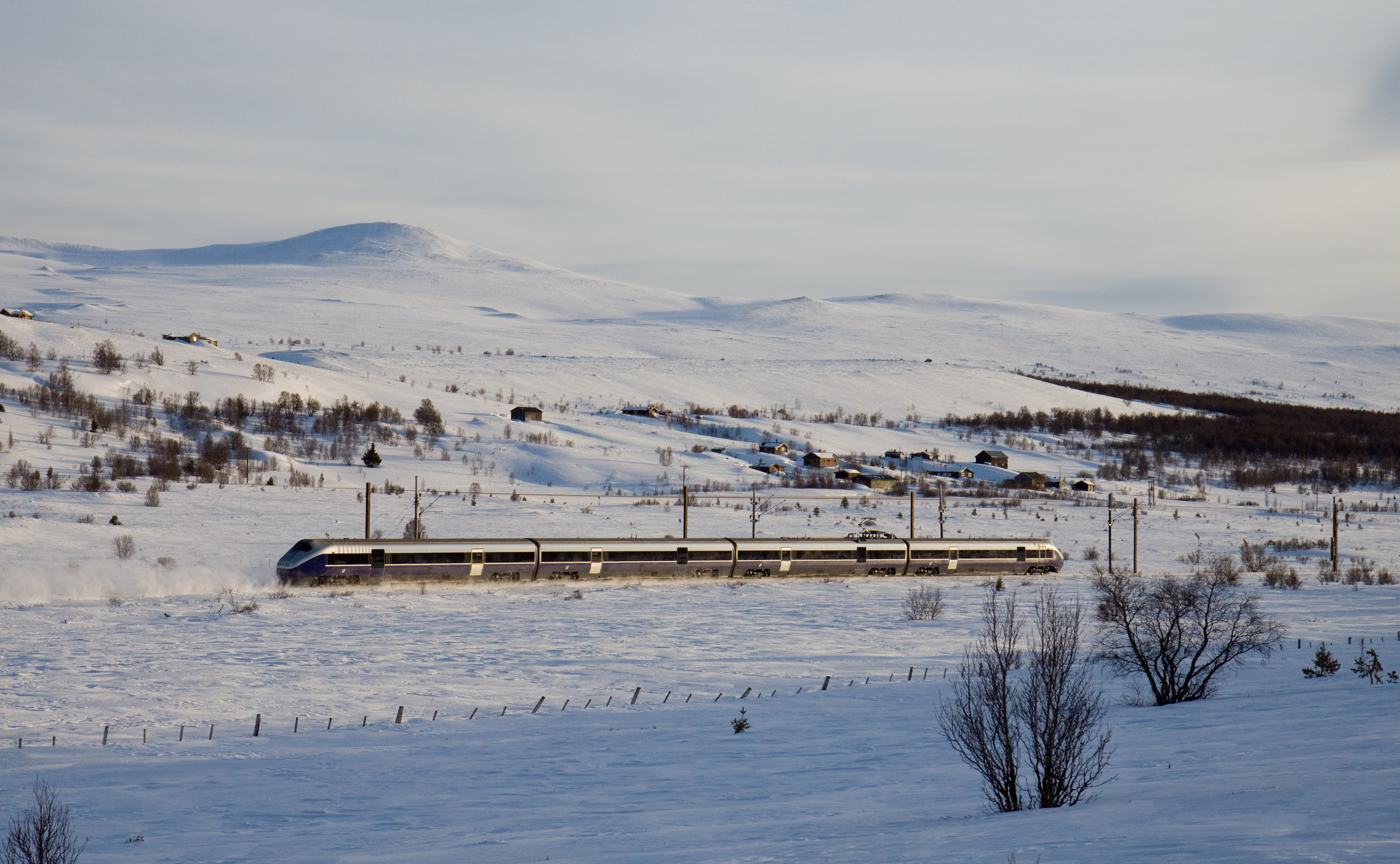
Class 73 train on the Dovre Line

On 17 June 2000, a Class 73 train derailed at Nelaug Station on the Sørland Line. The train was traveling at slow speed and no-one was injured, but had the derailment happened at full speed, it could have been fatal. The derailment was caused by a fatigue failure in the front axle of the train. All Class 71 and 73 trains were immediately grounded, and were investigated by maintenance crews. The derailed train had recently had its axle checked for fatigue, but no cracks had been found. On 19 June, NSB stated that they had made insufficient tests during the 100,000-kilometer (62,000 mi) controls. Class 71 had been through ultrasonic testing and were therefore allowed to resume operation the day after the accident. A DNV report from late August concluded with that the cracks had been caused by rust, which was again caused by water being sealed in by the corrosion-protective layer.

On 23 June, Quale stated that the inspectorate should never have approved the trains. He stated that the Sørland Line was extreme in Europe in the number of curves, and that this gave increased stress on the axles. The tests which were used to approve the trains had been done on the Dovre Line and with a Class 71 set equipped with tilting technology, a class which weighs less than Class 73. He further stated that NSB had controlled only part of the axle and that if proper tests had been made, the fatigue would have been discovered. NSB stated that they had tested the trains on a section of the Dovre Line they considered to be more curvy than the most curvy parts of the Sørland Line. There was also a misunderstanding in the approval, as NSB had said to DNV that the tests on the Dovre Line were not to be considered representative for the Sørland Line, while the inspectorate had the impression that DNV had approved the tests also for the Sørland Line. NSB stated that all tests would be done again before the trains were put back into service.

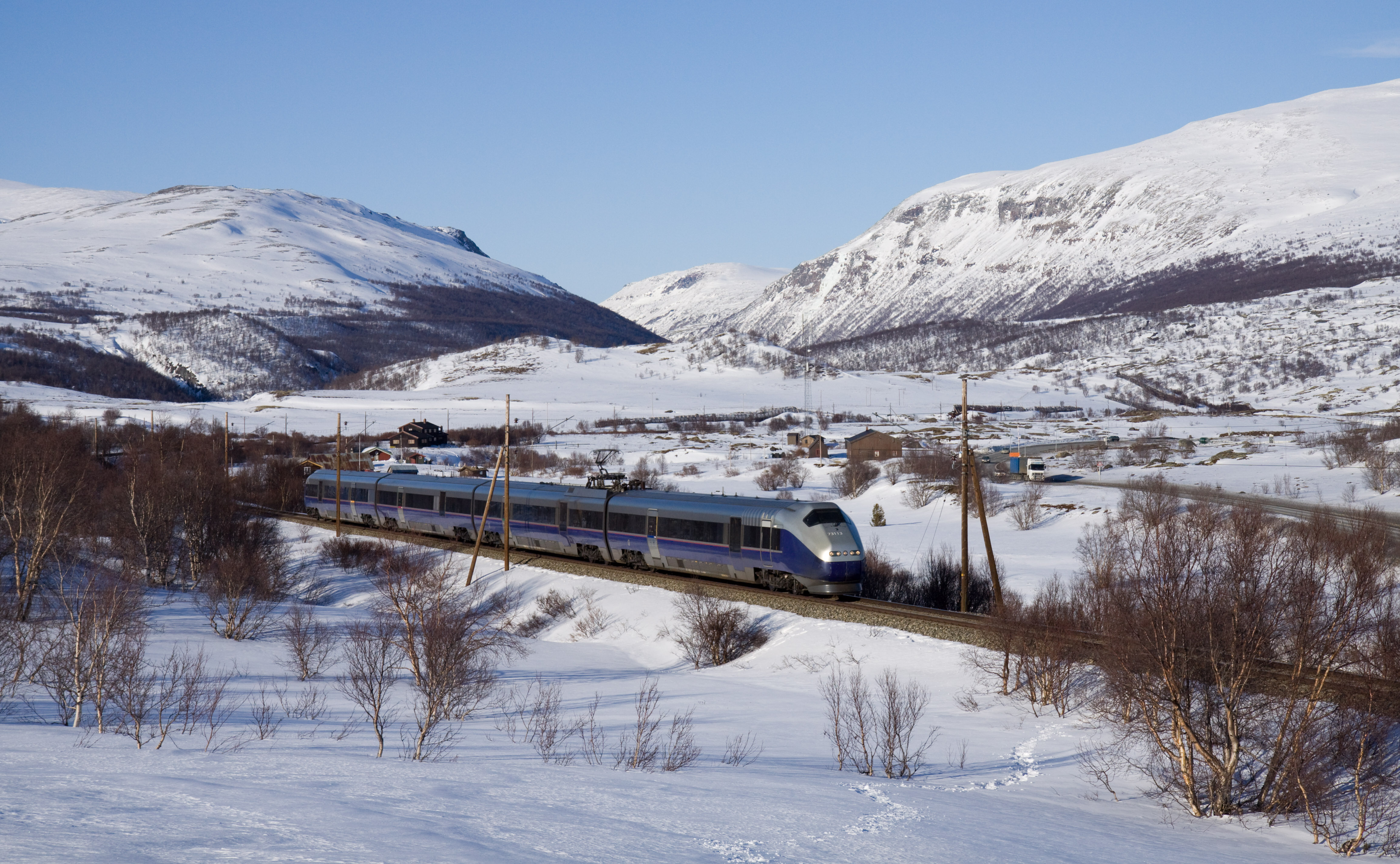
A-series train near Hjerkinn on the Dovre Line. The unit was destroyed in the fire at Hallingskeid in 2011.

NSB stated that they would demand a discount from Adtranz. Following the incident, the trains would have to be in for maintenance examinations every 100,000 kilometers (62,000 mi), rather than every 1,200,000 kilometers (750,000 mi). With each exam costing NOK 50,000, NSB stated that this represented an extra cost of NOK 20 million per year. The contract between Adtranz and NSB states how often trains are to be maintained, and Adtranz holds a financial responsibility if the trains systematically need more maintenance than that. By 24 June, cracks had been found in two additional units. Similar cracks had occurred in the X2 trains, but after many years of operations. The same manufacturer had been used for the axles on both trains. In Sweden impurities in the steel, combined with undersized axles, were thought to be a cause, but replacements had caused the same issues. On 26 June, NSB stated that in April they had discovered that not checking the whole axle was a weakness in the maintenance procedures, but that despite this, no new examinations had been done. The reason this was ignored, was that there was nothing that indicated that this part of the axle represented a weak point.

Ueland was unanimously fired as CEO by NSB's board on 29 June. Immediately afterwards his deputy Randi Flesland resigned, after she had rejected the board's proposal for her to become acting CEO. The same day, Adtranz assumed full responsibility for the defects, and guaranteed that they would cover NSB's costs. In a report, Adtranz stated that the axles should be examined every 6,000 kilometers (3,700 mi), which would mean weekly inspections. They stated that they hoped further inquiries would find a way to have less frequent inspections. This was rejected by NSB, who would not have sufficient trains to run the schedules with such a tight inspection scheme. Instead, Adtranz and NSB agreed to a new programme which would involve inspection every three weeks.

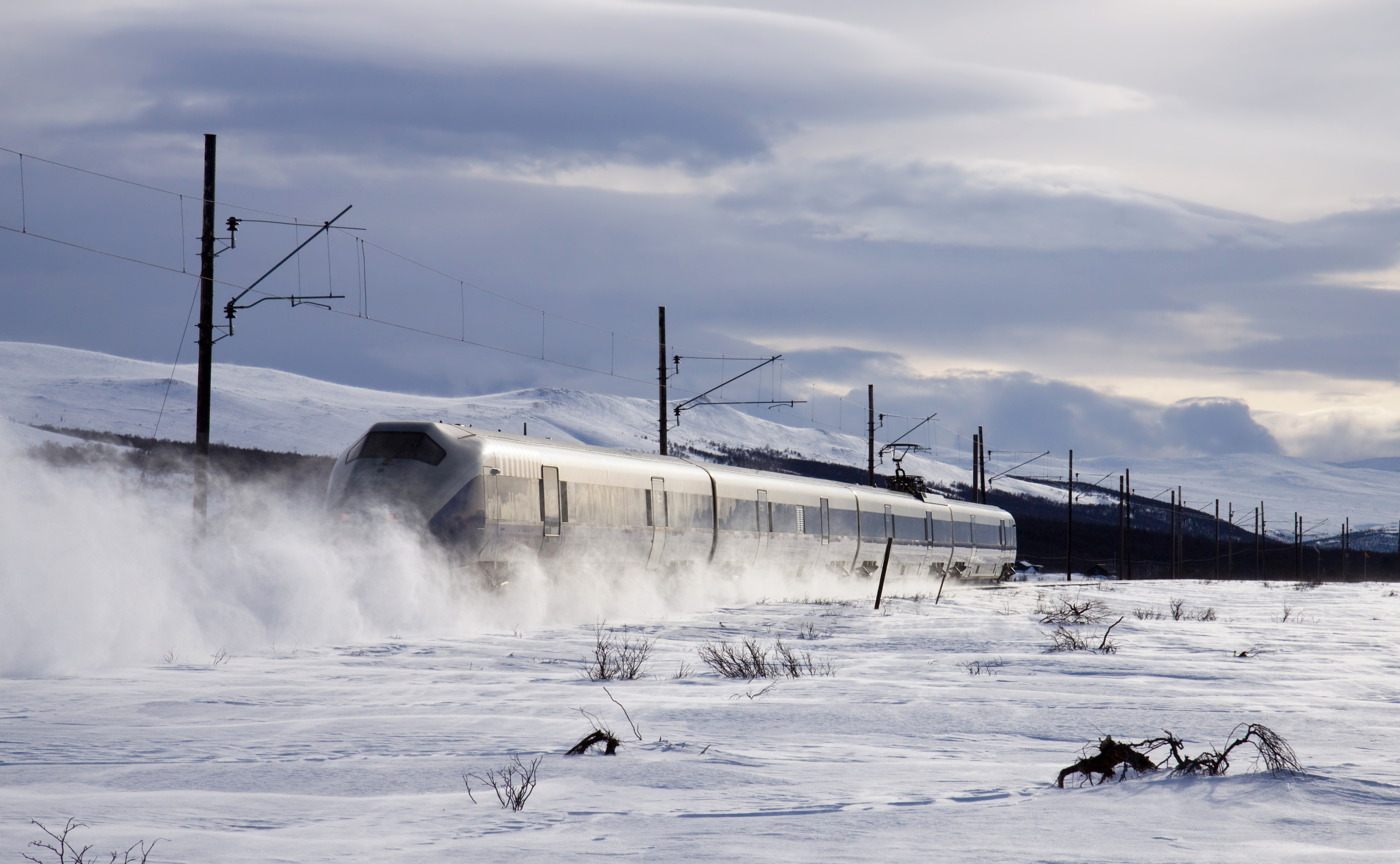
A-series near Dombås on the Dovre Line

The trains were put back into service on 13 July. The trains were only allowed to operate at conventional speeds and had to go through a weekly inspection. At the same time, NSB removed the surcharge on the Signatur services. NSB stated that they were considering revocation the purchase of the four trains which were still to be delivered. In addition to problems with axles, there were also issues with the braking and air conditioning systems. In mid-August, the tilting mechanism was disabled on all the trains because of a fault in a bearing in the connection between the bogie and the body which allowed for a movement of several millimetres (at least 0.1 in). In late August, problems occurred with the braking system causing the trains to automatically brake even when not receiving such signals from the automatic train stop system.

The cause of the cracks was a rubber washer which had been installed on the first eight trains—rather than the conventional plastic cover—which was intended to protect the axles from ice and stones. Adtranz had delivered thousands of trains with the conventional method without cracks, but the washers trapped water and this caused them to corrode and crack. Adtranz had applied a coat of paint as the sole means to avoid corrosion to the axle. The DNV inspector had "hardly believed his ears" when he heard about it. In addition, the axles were undersized, and DNV stated that it was only under duress that they considered it safe to operate the trains at conventional speeds, and that all the axles would have to be replaced. On 30 August, NSB gave Adtranz two weeks to solve the axle issues unless the contract was to be revoked.

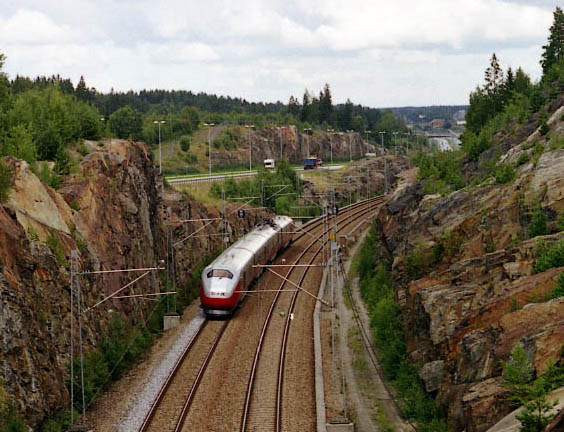
B-series train near Vestby on the Østfold Line

In mid-September, the press announced that on 8 May 1996 NSB had agreed that Class 71's axles could receive a steel quality substandard to European standard and recommendation from the International Union of Railways. The reason was that the class would have a much higher weight than planned, and that this would cause the trains to operate more slowly and thus not be able to reach the airport in the desired 19 minutes. Class 73 inherited the same axle quality from the Class 71 order. On 11 September, Adtranz accepted responsibility for the axle problems, and stated that they would replace all axles free of charge, an operation which would cost them NOK 70 million. In October, Adtranz announced that they would also replace all the wheels on both classes. NSB was spending NOK 1.5 million on brake discs and brake shoes per month. The parties continued to disagree on the size of compensation Adtranz should give NSB, with NOK 100 million separating the two. In July, NSB replaced DNV with CorrOcean as their inspection supplier for the class. NSB stated that this halved the cost of the inspections. The same month, Bombardier Transportation, who by then had taken over Adtranz, stated that they were going to replace the bogie frames for all the Class 71 and 73, as well as Class 93 trains, as part of the compensation deal with NSB.

=== Bergen and Østfold ===
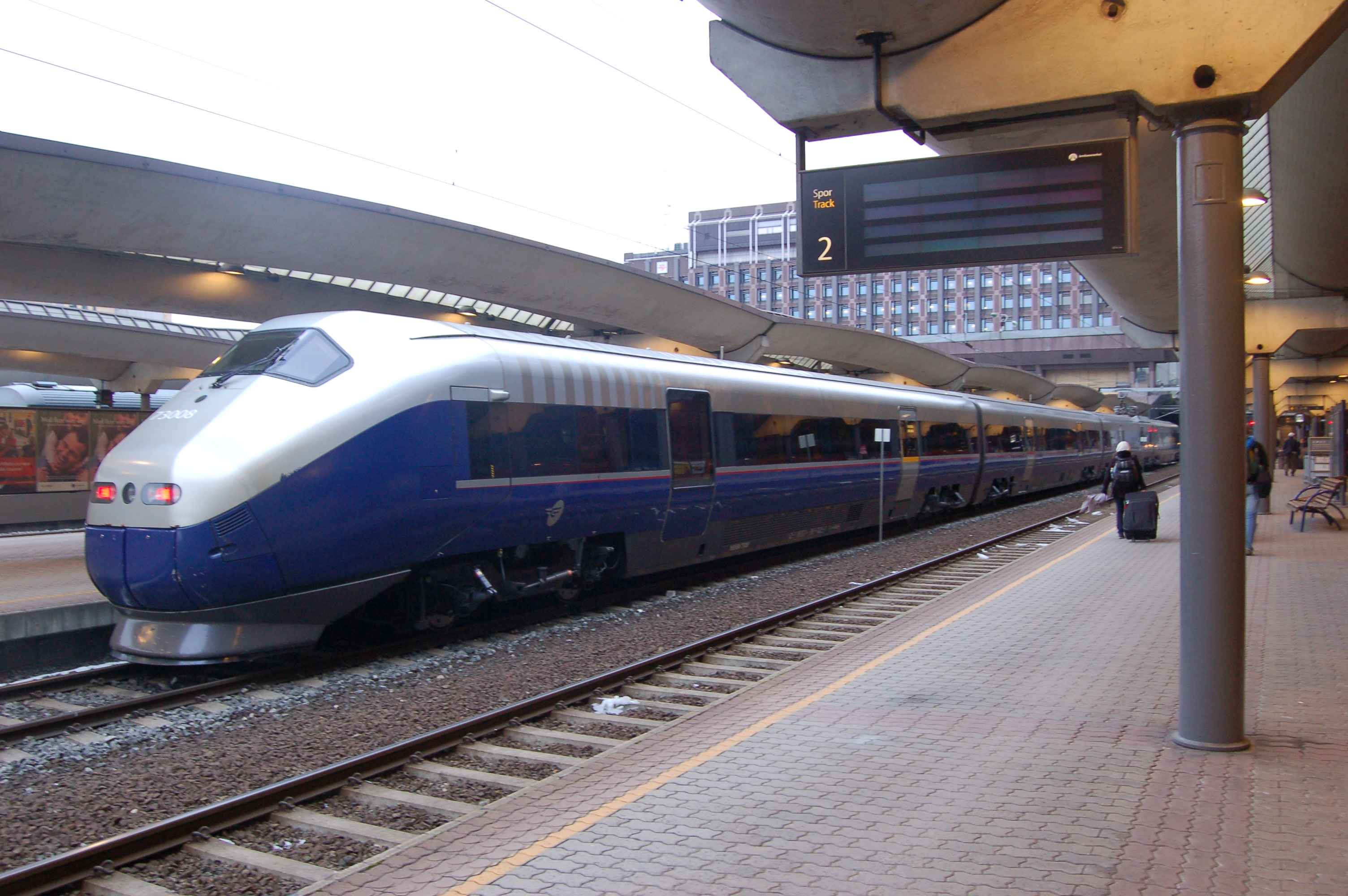
A-series train at Oslo Central Station

The first of the B-series trains were delivered for trial runs on 7 March 2001. In May, NSB stated that they would never be able to operate the trains with the speeds they had previously stated they could, and that at least for the next year, the tilting trains would operate at the same speeds as conventional trains. On 17 September 2001, the trains were put into service on the Bergen Line between Oslo and Bergen. During the following winter, the trains had problems running through snowdrift unless they were running at a sufficiently high speed. Because part of the Bergen Line had frost heave, trains were forced to drive extra slowly, causing trains to get stuck. NSB stated that tests had shown that Class 73 was better able to do this than El 16, which had previously been the main locomotive on the line, although Class 73 did not do as well as the modern El 18. In January 2002, NSB started rebuilding the A-series trains with a larger baggage compartment. This was largely because of insufficient space for passengers to take skis with them.

The B-series was originally put into service on the Sørland Line between Kristiansand and Stavanger, as part of the brand Agenda. The B-series had been planned for use on the Østfold Line, but because the latter is largely a commuter service with many standing passengers, the company was not comfortable using the trains there until the issues regarding the axles and wheels had been resolved. NSB also stated that they were dissatisfied with that the A-series and B-series were not capable of working together. The B-series' lack of a staffed dining car meant that they could not be used on intercity trains, while the A-series' smaller seating capacity meant it could not be used on regional trains. The B-series was put into service on the Østfold Line on 6 January 2003. NSB stated that the new class would offer better comfort and reduce the railway's problems from delays caused by icing. On the Østfold Line, the maximum speed is 160 km/h (99 mph). From June 2003, NSB discontinued the brands Agenda and Signatur. The same year, NSB adjusted the timetables so that the trains look the same time as the conventional trains, and that they would use one minute more than in 1982. Starting on 15 December, three of the services on the Østfold Line were extended to Gothenburg in Sweden.

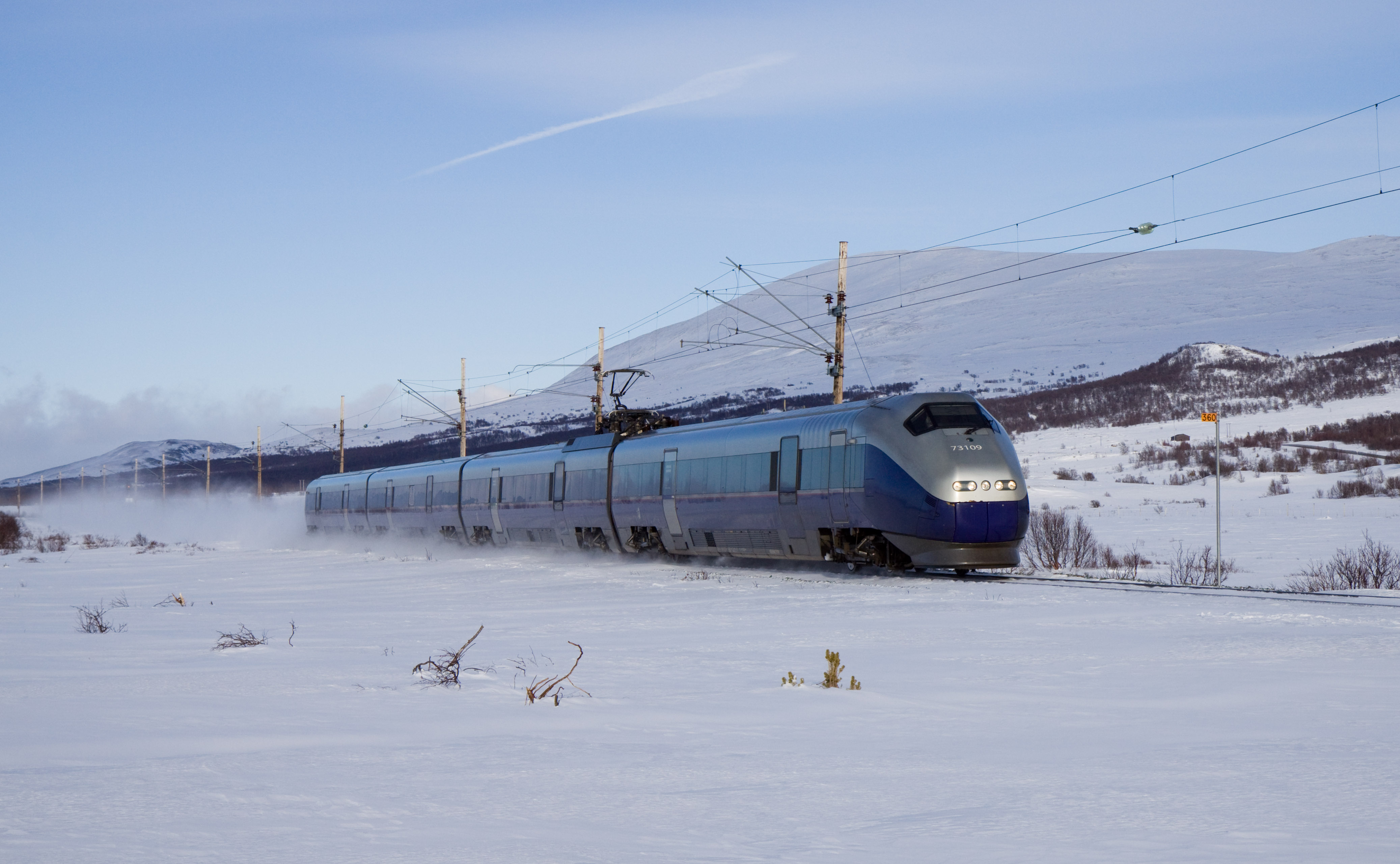
A-series train on the Dovre Line

On 21 February 2007, a Class 73 derailed after hitting an avalanche between Hallingskeid and Myrdal on the Bergen Line. The accident raised questions about the class's abilities to handle hard snow, such as in avalanches. In particular, a DNV report from 1999 had shown that the train could act as a sled, lose contact with the tracks and slide on top of the snow. A former NSB employee who worked with route planning, stated that a locomotive-hauled train would be better suitable for such situations, because more of the weight is located at the front of the train, and it will therefore plow instead of slide. The National Rail Administration said that they took extra precautions for the Class 73 trains and that during snowfall they would run a snow-clearing unit ahead of all Class 73 runs. NSB stated that they would consider the possibility of reverting to conventional trains, but that unless new information could shed light on the situation, they would retain use of the Class 73 trains.

NSB assured passengers that the trains were more capable than their reputation, and that they would continue to be used on the Bergen Line. If an alternative was needed, NSB stated that they would have to use El 18 locomotives in combination with B5 carriages. However, the carriages were at the time being used on regional rush-hour trains around Oslo, were in need of renovation and did not offer the facilities required by intercity travelers. In October, NSB stated that they planned to withdraw Class 73 from service on the Bergen Line, because the use of multiple units was not flexible enough. With locomotive-hauled trains, it was possible for the company to add or remove just a single carriage, but with multiple units, it was necessary to double the capacity if a single unit was insufficient. While originally planned to be introduced in 2008, delays in the upgrades delayed the delivery of the carriages beyond 2010.

On 16 June 2011, a fire started in the snow tunnel at Hallingskeid Station on the Bergen Line. As the station is unstaffed, there was no prior warning of the fire until the driver saw it from the cab just as the train entered the tunnel. More or less simultaneously, the train reached the point of the line were the fire had damaged the overhead supply. The driver immediately applied the emergency brake, which caused the train to stop 5 to 10 meters (16 to 33 ft) from the fire. Because the train had no power, it was not possible to reverse out. The 257 passengers were then immediately evacuated. All personnel acted according to regulations and no-one was injured in the accident. According to the driver, had he not lost the power, he would have continued through the tunnel, as the fire was just at the beginning stage. The train, which consisted of two Class 73 units, no. 10 and 13, eventually caught fire and was damaged beyond repair. Class 73 trains are to be taken out of service on the Bergen Line from the fall of 2012.

== Mid-life overhaul ==
Early May 2014 Dutch railway refurbishment and overhaul company NedTrain announced they had won the contract to refurbish the entire fleet. The first set was to arrive in May 2014 for inspection, scheduling of the works involved and evaluation of the process while the remainder of the fleet would come in from spring 2015. All sets were to be transported by rail via Sweden, Denmark and Germany to the main facility in Haarlem.

== Go-Ahead Norge ==
Seven of the class started operating under Go-Ahead Norge on the Oslo to Stavanger services from December 2019.
