= Rønneberg =

Rønneberg is a Norwegian surname. Notable people with the surname include:

- Anton Johan Rønneberg (1856–1922), Norwegian politician for the Liberal Party
- Anton Rønneberg (1902–1989), Norwegian writer, theatre critic, dramaturg and theatre director
- Erling Rønneberg (1923–2008), Norwegian politician for the Labour Party
- Joachim Rønneberg (1919–2018), Norwegian Army officer and broadcaster
- Joachim Holmboe Rønneberg (1851–1929), Norwegian politician
- Kristian Rønneberg (1898–1982), Norwegian politician for the Farmers' Party
