= Rønneberg family =

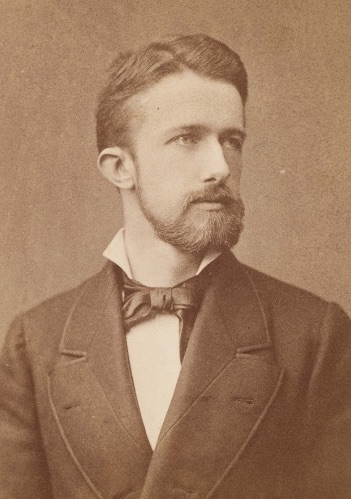
Joachim Holmboe Rønneberg (1851–1929), businessman and politician from Ålesund, Norway.

Rønneberg is a Norwegian patrician family from Sunnmøre. It was the most prominent business family of Ålesund during the 19th and early 20th century, and its history is closely connected to the rise of Ålesund as a city. The Rønneberg Company, founded in 1812, was for a long time the city's largest company and employer.

The family is descended from Christopher Tjærandsen Rønneberg (1737–1824), the son of a farmer from Jæren, who became a burgher and a wealthy merchant at Sunnmøre. He was the father of ship-owner and fish wholesaler Carl Rønneberg (1779–1858), who founded the Rønneberg Company, and who is often regarded as the principal founder of the city of Ålesund. Carl Rønneberg was the father of Carl E. Rønneberg Jr. (1815–1880) and of wholesaler and consul Rasmus Gerhard Rønneberg (1822–1884), and the grandfather of Anna Rasmunda Rønneberg Kaas-Lund and wholesaler and mayor of Ålesund Joachim Holmboe Rønneberg (1851–1929). The latter was the father of theatre director Anton Johan Rønneberg (1902–1989) and Elisabeth (Marie) Rønneberg, who married ophthalmologist and President of the Norwegian Medical Association Harald Lystad. Joachim Holmboe Rønneberg was the grandfather of Erling Rønneberg and Joachim Rønneberg, and a great-grandfather of Joakim Lystad.
