= Lesjaverk Station =

Railway station in Lesja Municipality, Norway

Lesjaverk
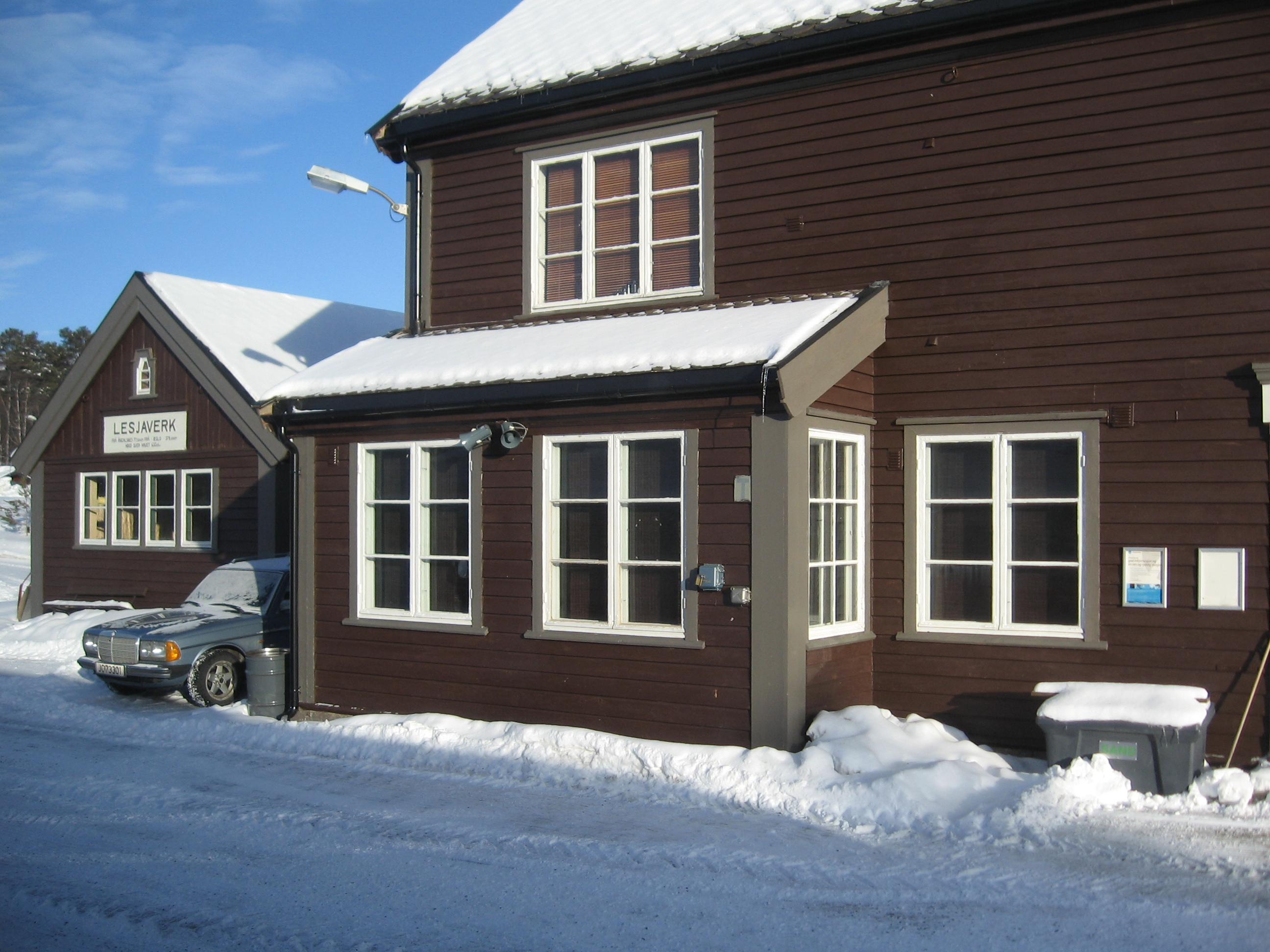

General information
- Location: Lesjaverk, Lesja Municipality; Norway
- Coordinates: 62°11′32″N 8°32′17″E
- Elevation: 633.2 m (2,077 ft) AMSL
- Owner: Bane NOR
- Operator: SJ Norge
- Line: Rauma Line
- Distance: 379.89 km (236.05 mi)
- Platforms: 1

History
- Opened: 1921
Location

Lesjaverk Station is a railway station at Lesjaverk in Lesja Municipality, Norway on the Rauma Line. The station is located 36 kilometres (22 mi) from Dombås and is served by all trains on the Rauma Line. The station was opened as part of the first stretch of the railway in 1921.

| Preceding station | | | Following station |
|---|---|---|---|
| Lesja | Rauma Line | | Bjorli |
| Preceding station | Regional trains | | Following station |
| Lesja | R65 | Dombås–Åndalsnes | Bjorli |
