= Bjorli Station =

Railway station in Lesja, Norway

Bjorli
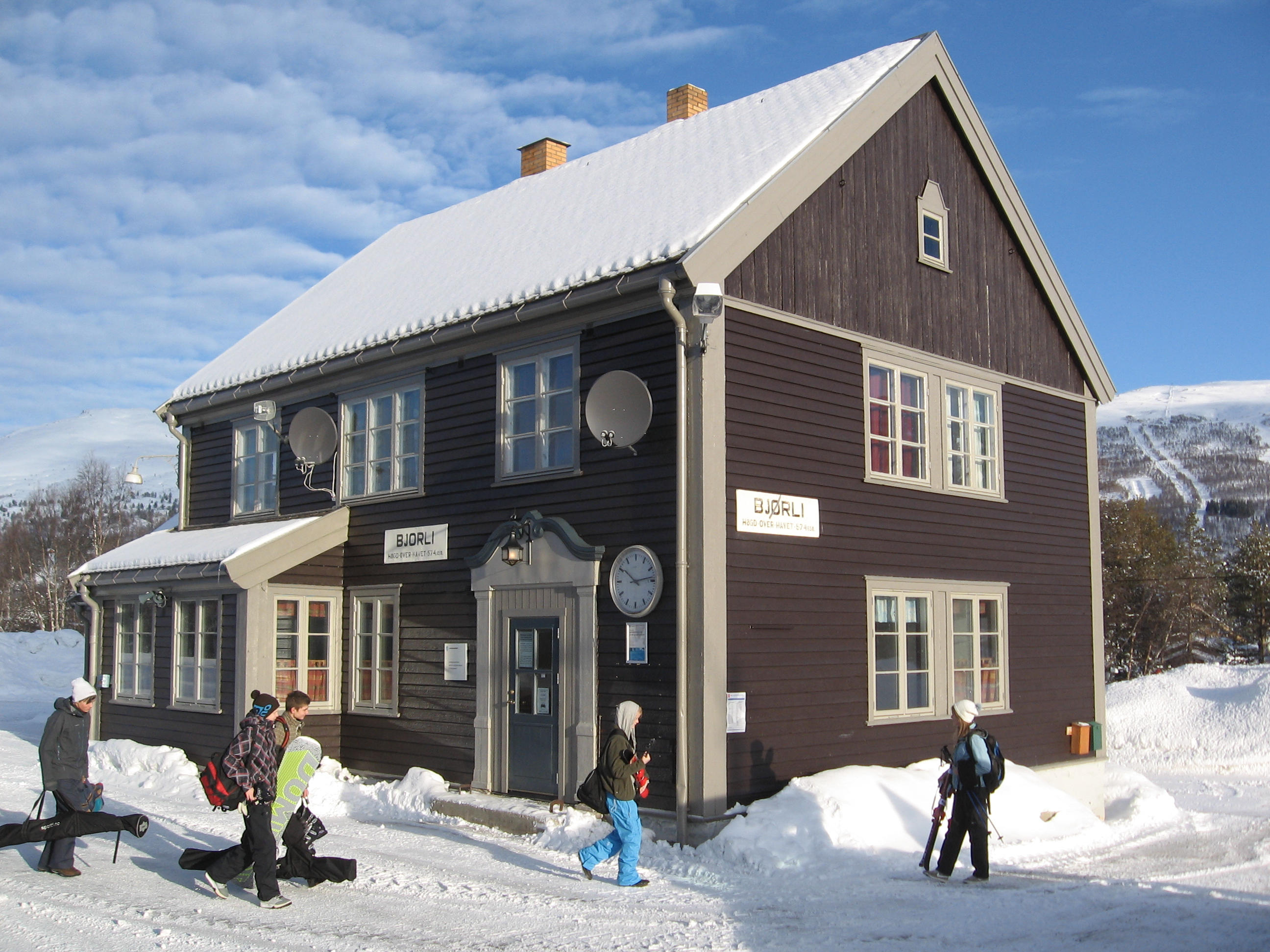

General information
- Location: Bjorli, Lesja Municipality; Norway
- Coordinates: 62.2580°N 8.2019°E
- Elevation: 574.7 m (1,885 ft) amsl
- Owner: Bane NOR
- Operator: SJ Norge
- Line: Rauma Line
- Distance: 399.84 km (248.45 mi)
- Platforms: 1

Construction
- Architect: Gudmund Hoel, NSB Arkitektkontor

History
- Opened: 19 November 1921
Location

Bjorli Station (Norwegian: Bjorli stasjon) is a railway station on the Rauma Line located at Bjorli in Lesja Municipality, Norway. The station opened on 19 November 1921 and was the line's terminus until 1923. In addition to a station building, Bjorli had a water tower, roundhouse, turntable and a restaurant seating 700 people, the latter which was bombed to pieces in 1940. The station is served by SJ Norge trains four times per day per direction. In the summer, the station is the terminus of a tourist services from Åndalsnes.

== History ==
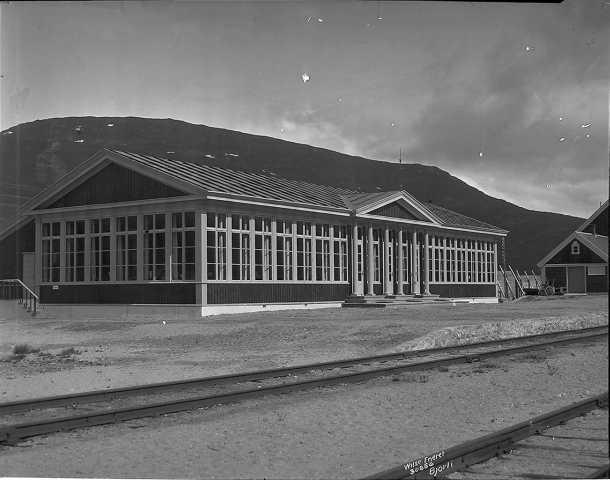
The former restaurant building

Construction of the station started in 1918 and was finished in 1921. The station, excluding its water tower and restaurant, cost 117,062 Norwegian krone (NOK) to build and took 26,883 man-hours. The station and axillary buildings were designed by Gudmund Hoel of NSB Arkitektkontor. The station opened with the first part of the Rauma Line on 19 November 1921. It remained the terminus until 25 November 1923, when the next section, to Verma Station, opened.

The station is located in a wide, flat terrain, so getting sufficient pressure to supply water for the steam locomotives would be very expensive. Instead, a water tower was built at the station, with water pumped from the river Rauma. The pump is located 140 meters (460 ft) from the tower, with the water intake being another 50 meters (160 ft) from the pump. The water tower was built in natural stone brick and is square. After the steam locomotive services ended, was used as a storage facility. The tower cost NOK 103,795 to build. The station also received a turntable, which cost NOK 101,236, which had a 20-meter (66 ft) diameter. Although it was planned completed on 1 August 1921, construction was delayed and it was taken into use one month after the station opened. Bjorli had a temporary roundhouse while the station was the terminus. Built out of wood, the building cost NOK 30,373.

On 1 July 1927, a separate restaurant building with place for 700 diners opened. Open only during summer until September, it was aimed at cruise ship tourists who took the line from Åndalsnes to Bjorli. Operated by Norsk Spisevognselskap, it was highly profitable. However, during the German occupation of Norway in 1940, the building was bombed and burnt down, and was never rebuilt.

== Facilities ==
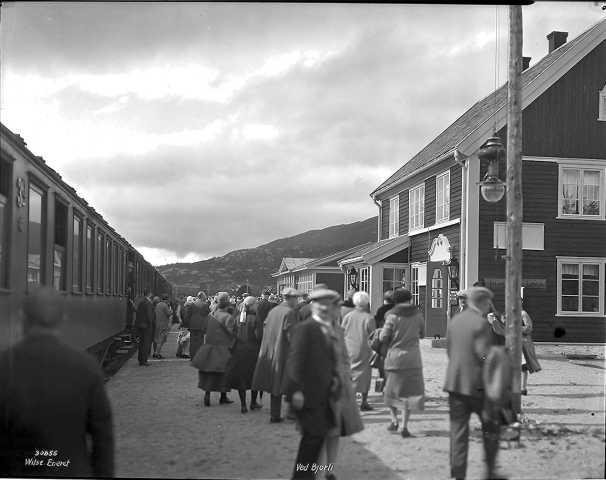
Train at Bjorli in 1927

The station building is owned by Bane NOR Eiendom, while the tracks and infrastructure are owned and operated by Bane NOR. The station building is unstaffed, but the waiting room is open from 07:00 to 22:00. The line lacks centralized traffic control, so the station must be staffed for trains to pass. The station has three tracks: two which are used for trains to pass and one which is designed for loading, and has an effective length of 75 meters (246 ft). The station has ten parking spaces but lacks ticket vending machines. The station is 575 meters (1,886 ft) above mean sea level and located 57 kilometers (35 mi) from both Dombås and Åndalsnes, and 400 kilometers (250 mi) from Oslo. It is located in the village of Bjorli in Lesja, that serves as an Alpine skiing center.

== Service ==
SJ Norge operates passenger train services on the line. Using Class 93 trains, they operate four services in each direction per day. During the summer, from June through August, SJ operates the trains as tourist trains, limiting the service from Åndalsnes to Bjorli.

| Preceding station | | | Following station |
|---|---|---|---|
| Lesjaverk | Rauma Line | | Åndalsnes |
| Preceding station | Regional trains | | Following station |
| Lesjaverk | R65 | Dombås–Åndalsnes | Åndalsnes |
