= Stuguflåt Bridge =

Stuguflåt Bridge Stuguflåtbrua
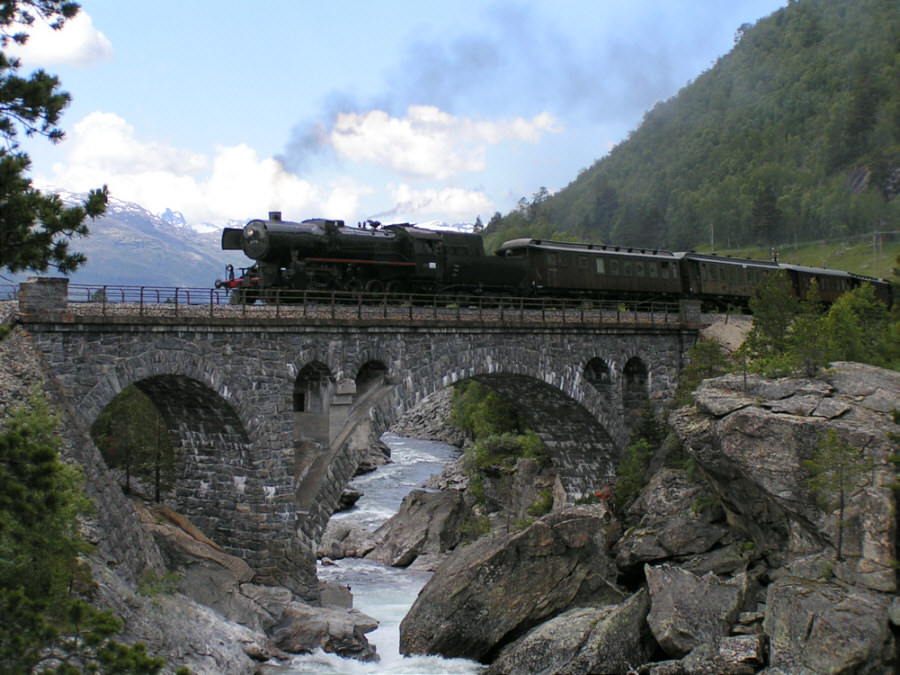
- View of a Class 64 "Great German" train runs over the Stuguflåt Bridge
- Coordinates: 62°17′N 8°08′E
- Carries: Raumabanen railway
- Crosses: Rauma River
- Locale: Lesja Municipality, Norway

Characteristics
- Material: Stone
- Total length: 54.1 metres (177 ft)
- Width: 10.6 metres (35 ft)
- Longest span: 30 metres (98 ft)

History
- Construction start: 1919
- Construction end: 22 August 1922
- Construction cost: 407997 kr

The Stuguflåt Bridge (Norwegian: Stuguflåtbrua or Stuguflåten bru) is a stone railway bridge north of Stuguflåten in Lesja Municipality in Innlandet county, Norway. The bridge is located along the Rauma Line and it crosses over the Rauma River. The bridge is 54.1 meters (177 ft) long, has a 30-meter (98 ft) span, and is 10.6 meters (35 ft) wide.

Work began on the bridge in 1919, and the foundations were laid in autumn 1920, with the walls started by summer 1921. The first rails were laid on 16 September 1921 and were finished on 22 August 1922. The first train crossed in autumn 1922 and materials from this cargo were used to make a permanent snowplough. The Stuguflåt Bridge has been used year round since 1923, and the total cost of the bridge was 407,997 kr.

In January 1945, Joachim Rønneberg and SOE agents (Operation Fieldfare) tried to damage the bridge in order to halt the movement by German occupying forces on the Rauma Line. The bridge was reopened three weeks later.

== See also ==
- List of bridges in Norway
- List of bridges in Norway by length
