= Lesja Station =

Railway station in Lesja, Norway

Lesja
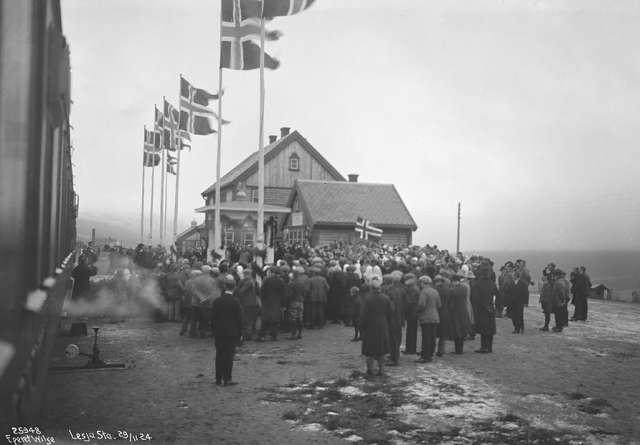
- Train arriving on November 29, 1924

General information
- Location: Lesja, Lesja Municipality; Norway
- Coordinates: 62°07′07″N 8°51′13″E
- Elevation: 634.1 m (2,080 ft) AMSL
- Owner: Bane NOR
- Operator: SJ Norge
- Line: Rauma Line
- Distance: 360.68 km (224.12 mi)
- Platforms: 1

History
- Opened: 1921
Location

Lesja Station is a railway station on the Rauma Line in Lesja in Lesja Municipality, Norway. The station is located 17 kilometers (11 mi) from Dombås and is served by all trains on the Rauma Line. The station was opened as part of the first stretch of the railway in 1921.

Preceding station			Following station
Dombås	Rauma Line		Lesjaverk
Preceding station	Regional trains		Following station
Dombås	R65	Dombås–Åndalsnes	Lesjaverk
