= Renneberg =

Renneberg is a German surname. Notable people with the surname include:

- Annett Renneberg (born 1978), German actress and singer
- David Renneberg (born 1942), Australian cricketer
- Heinz Renneberg (1927–1999), German rower

== See also ==
- Rønneberg
