= Carl Rønneberg =

Norwegian merchant, ship owner, and fish exporter

Carl Rønneberg (10 August 1779 – 29 January 1858) was a Norwegian merchant, ship owner, and fish exporter.

Carl Esaias Rønneberg was born at Kriksholmen in the parish of Herøy in Romsdalen county, Norway. He was the son of Christopher Tjærandsen Rønneberg (1737–1824) and Margrethe Christine Rasmusdatter Frøysa (1736–1888). His father was from Jæren and became a wealthy merchant in Sunnmøre.

Rønneberg first worked as a trade manager in Lyngen in Troms county. He established the merchant house Carl E. Rønneberg & Sønner in 1812. He also purchased the Korsen farm, which became the trading center of Aalesund. His company became dominant in the city during the 19th century, and for a long time it was the city's largest company and employer.

In 1811 he married Elisabeth Marie Mechlenburg (1781–1853). They were the parents of Carl E. Rønneberg Jr. (1815–1880) and Rasmus Gerhard Rønneberg (1822–1884). Their descendants included Joachim Holmboe Rønneberg and Anton Johan Rønneberg.

== See also ==
- Rønneberg family
