= Lystad =

Lystad is a surname. Notable people with the surname include:

- Elsa Lystad (born 1930), Norwegian actress
- Fredrik Lystad Jacobsen (born 1990), Norwegian professional ice hockey player
- Harald Lystad (1875–1950), Norwegian physician, ophthalmologist and president of the Norwegian Ophthalmological Society
- Joakim Lystad (born 1953), Norwegian civil servant
- Knut Lystad (born 1946), Norwegian actor, singer, translator, screenwriter, comedian and occasional director
- Lars Lystad, Norwegian ski-orienteering competitor and world champion
- Magne Lystad (1932–1999), Norwegian orienteering competitor

== See also ==
- Lystad Bay, is a bay 2.5 nautical miles (5 km) wide which indents the west side of Horseshoe Island
