= Dønttinden =

Mountain in Møre og Romsdal, Norway

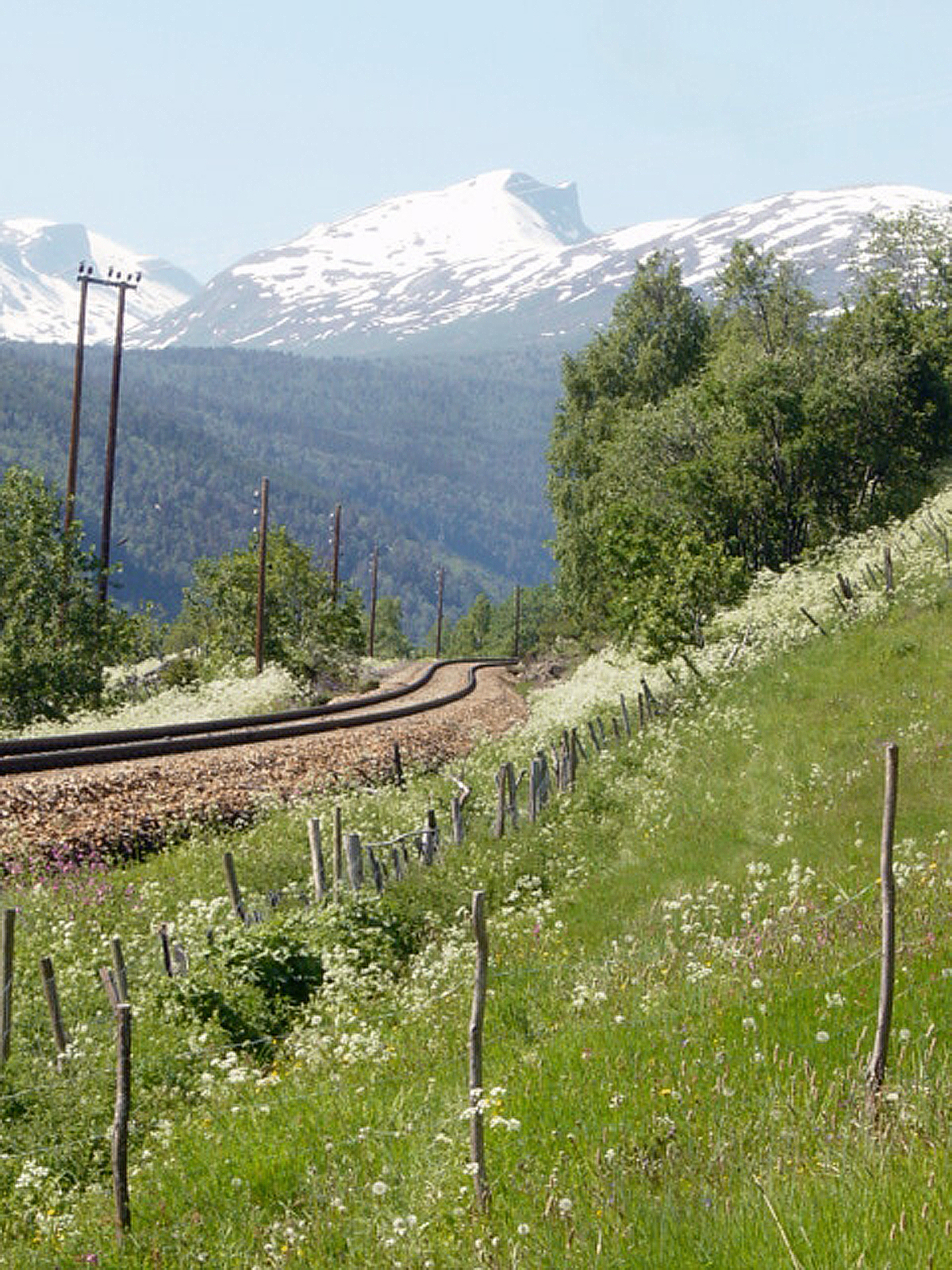
- Dønttinden with the Rauma Line in the foreground

Highest point
- Elevation: 1,676 m (5,499 ft)
- Prominence: 619 m (2,031 ft)
- Parent peak: Breitinden
- Isolation: 5 km (3.1 mi)
- Coordinates: 62.4054°N 7.9011°E

Geography
- Interactive map of the mountain
- Location: Møre og Romsdal, Norway
- Parent range: Romsdalsalpane

Dønttinden is a mountain in Rauma Municipality in Møre og Romsdal county, Norway. The 1,676-metre (5,499 ft) tall mountain is located inside the Reinheimen National Park in the Romsdalen valley. The European route E136 highway passes just north of the mountain. The Troll Wall and mountains of Store Trolltinden lie about 12 kilometres (7.5 mi) to the northwest.

== See also ==
- List of mountains of Norway
