= Anton Johan Rønneberg =

Norwegian politician (1856–1922)

Anton Johan Rønneberg (6 August 1856 – 10 March 1922) was a Norwegian politician for the Liberal Party.

== Personal life ==
He was born in Aalesund to Rasmus Gerhard Rønneberg (1822–1884) and his wife Anna Margrethe Holmboe (1825–1907). He had several brothers and sisters. His mother was a niece of Even Hammer Holmboe, Hans Holmboe and Leonhard Christian Borchgrevink Holmboe, and first cousin of Jens Holmboe. Anton Johan Rønneberg was also a distant relative of Hilmar Martinus Strøm and Walter Scott Dahl. Through his older brother Joakim he was a granduncle of WWII resistance fighters Joachim and Erling Rønneberg.

He married in 1850.

== Career ==
Rønneberg completed his secondary education in Aalesund in 1874. He studied at the Royal Saxon Polytechnic in Dresden from 1876 to 1880, and then enrolled in law studies, graduating as cand.jur. in 1883.

He found a job in Tvedestrand in 1884, but moved back to Aalesund the next year to work as an attorney. He later became stipendiary magistrate (byfoged). He was a member of the municipal council of Aalesund Municipality from 1888 to 1898, serving as mayor from 1897. He served as a deputy representative to the Norwegian Parliament during the term 1904–1906, representing the constituency of Aalesund og Molde.

Rønneberg was also tax commissioner from 1892 to 1894, and from 1896 to 1904 he chaired the commission for development of the Rauma Line. He died in 1922, the Rauma Line finally opening in 1924.
