= Harald Lystad =

Norwegian physician (1875–1950)

Harald Oskar Christopher Lystad (2 August 1875 in Christiania – 21 May 1950) was a Norwegian physician, ophthalmologist and president of the Norwegian Medical Association from 1931 to 1932. He also served as the first president of the Norwegian Ophthalmological Society from 1926 to 1928.

He graduated with the cand.med. degree at the Royal Frederick University in 1901. He was deputy consultant at the National Hospital from 1905 to 1906, and had a private practice in Christiania as a specialist in ophthalmology from 1906.

In 1908, he married Elisabeth Marie Rønneberg, daughter of wholesaler, conservative politician and mayor of Ålesund, Joachim Holmboe Rønneberg (1851–1929). Harald Lystad was the grandfather of Joakim Lystad.
