= Ruth Krefting =

Norwegian painter and playwright

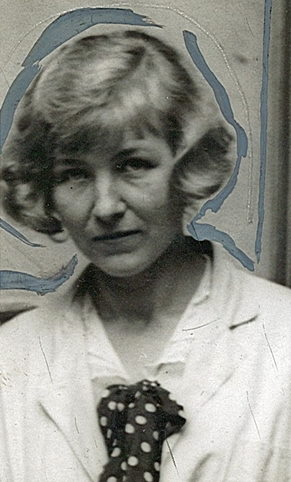
- Krefting in c. 1935-1940
- Born: 22 September 1900; Kristiania, Norway
- Died: 19 December 1987 (aged 87); Oslo
- Occupations: painter and playwright
- Spouse: Anton Rønneberg

Ruth Krefting (22 September 1900, Kristiania – 19 December 1987, Oslo) was a Norwegian painter and playwright.

== Biography ==
Born in Kristiania on 22 September 1900, Krefting was the daughter of Annette Marie Hægstad and Axel K. Krefting. In 1929 she married theatre director Anton Rønneberg. She was educated at the Norwegian National Academy of Craft and Art Industry and at the Norwegian National Academy of Fine Arts.

She painted landscapes, portraits and interiors, in particular interiors from farmers' houses. Se is represented with art works in several galleries in Norway, including the National Gallery of Norway. Her literary works include audio plays, as well as a biography of actress Aase Bye.

She died in Oslo on 19 December 1987.

== Selected works ==
- Klosteret i St. Paul, Provence (painting; 1952)
- Kjøkkeninteriør (painting; 1955)
- Vår i Frognerparken (painting; 1957)
- Blått lys (audio play; 1957)
- En klar dag (audio play; 1960)
- Sand og spindelvev (audio play; 1962)
- Skuespillerinnen Aase Bye (biography; 1963)
