= Bjorli =

Village in Lesja Municipality, Norway

- Village
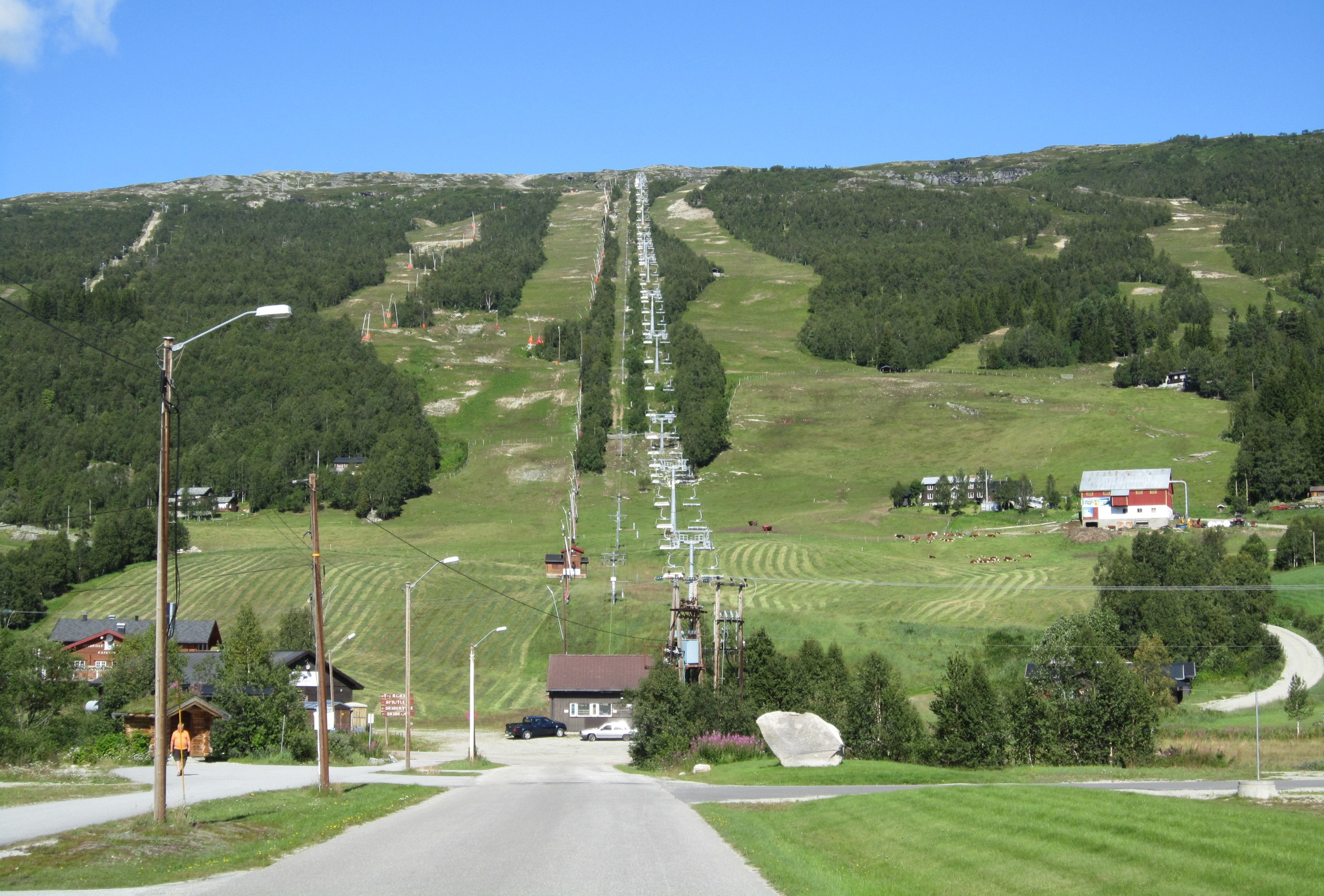
- View of the local ski centre
- Interactive map of Bjorli
- Location within Innlandet Location within Norway
- Coordinates: 62.25799°N 8.20583°E
- Country: Norway
- Region: Eastern Norway
- County: Innlandet
- District: Gudbrandsdalen
- Municipality: Lesja Municipality
- Elevation: 576 m (1,890 ft)
- Time zone: UTC+01:00 (CET)
  - Summer (DST): UTC+02:00 (CEST)
- Post Code: 2669 Bjorli

Bjorli (or Bjørli) is a village in Lesja Municipality in Innlandet county, Norway. It lies along the Rauma river near the municipal border with Rauma Municipality.

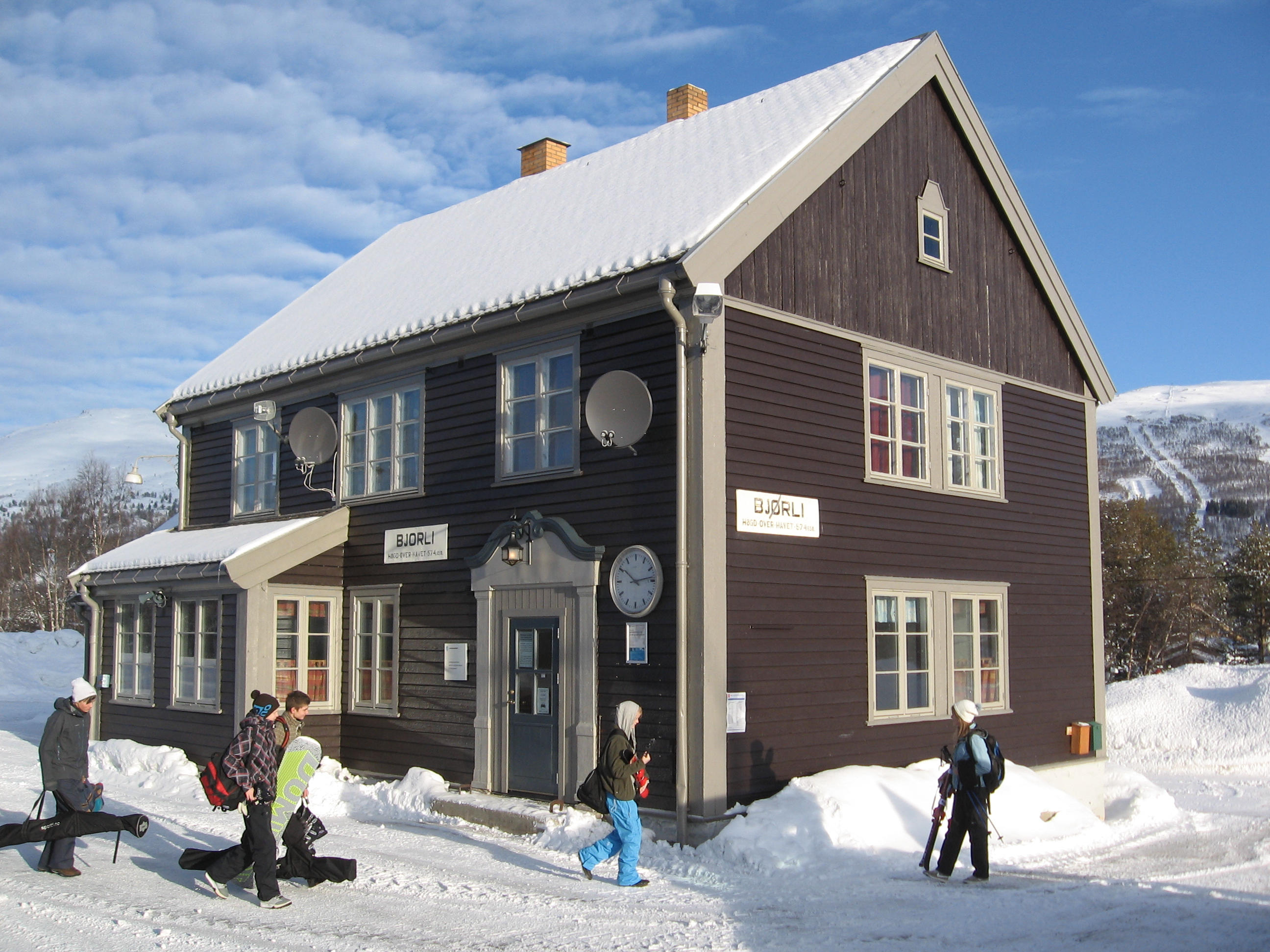
Bjorli Rail Station

Bjorli is served by the Bjorli Station on the Raumabanen railway line providing a convenient method for tourists to reach this destination. A large restaurant was built in 1927 at the rail station to service passengers of cruise ships from the port at Åndalsnes on Romsdalsfjord. It later burnt down and was not rebuilt.

The major tourist attractions at Bjorli include:

- Bjorli Ski Center, with early snow, 1 chair lift serving 660 metres (2,170 ft) of vertical drop, and numerous cross-country ski trails.
- Dovrefjell-Sunndalsfjella National Park's mountains make for spectacular hiking during the summer and skiing in the winter. Due to rather long walks between unstaffed huts and harsh, unstable weather conditions, this area is recommended for experienced hikers only.

Because of its unique mountainous terrain, this is the filming location for one scene in the Harry Potter movie Harry Potter and the Half-Blood Prince which came out in July 2009 in the United Kingdom and United States.
