= Norsk Spisevognselskap =

Norwegian rail restaurant company

- Type: State enterprise
- Industry: Rail transport
- Founded: 21 December 1918
- Defunct: 1 January 1975
- Fate: Merger
- Successor: Narvesen
- Headquarters: Oslo, Norway
- Products: Mobile catering
- Number of employees: 591 (1949)
- Parent: Norwegian State Railways

Norsk Spisevognselskap A/S, often abbreviated NSS or shortened to Spisevognselskapet (Norwegian for "The Dining Car Company"), was a Norwegian state enterprise which operated restaurant carriages on Norwegian trains and restaurants at railway stations and railway hotels. The company was established in December 1918, and started a catering service in 1919. Originally owned by the Norwegian Trunk Railway, it was acquired by the state in 1926. Meals served in the restaurant carriages were relatively expensive, although they were available to all passengers. In the 1950s, the company began using serving trolleys on trains.

In January 1975, NSS merged with the convenience-store chain Narvesen Kioskkompani into a new company called Narvesen–Spisevognselskapet. This enterprise was partly owned by the Norwegian State Railways (NSB) and Fritt Ord, before it merged with the Reitan Group and was delisted from the Oslo Stock Exchange.

== Background ==
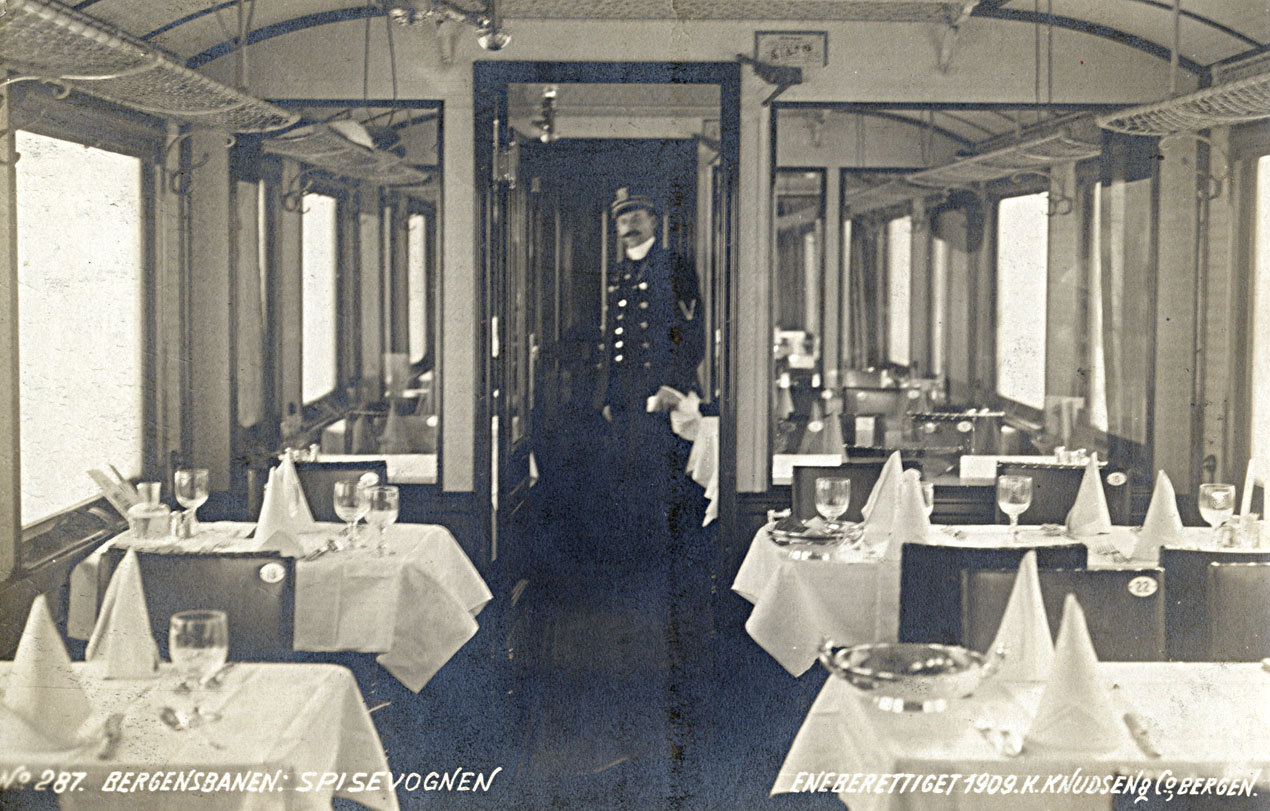
Restaurant carriage on a Bergen Line train in 1909

From the 1854 establishment of railways in Norway to 1909, no dining service was offered aboard trains; passengers were allowed to bring food with them. Train stations also lacked dining facilities. The first dining service was started by restaurateur Carl Christiansen. He established the restaurant at Drammen Station, and in 1907 was asked by NSB to establish a dining service aboard the express trains on the Bergen Line, which would open in 1909. After investigating similar operations in England and Germany, he ordered two carriages from Skabo Jernbanevognfabrikk. These were to be paid for by the state, but the Parliament of Norway delayed the grants after a long debate regarding the suitability of restaurant carriages on trains. The plans were opposed by the teetotaler faction of Parliament, but there was a majority in favor of dining service. To get the carriages in time, Christiansen personally guaranteed the production cost in case a state grant was not allocated. After the parliamentary decision, the cost of the carriages was refunded by NSB. In 1910, when President of the United States Theodore Roosevelt visited Oslo to receive the Nobel Peace Prize, several restaurant carriages were ordered solely for the occasion. Two years later, restaurant carriages were put in regular service on the Østfold Line.

== Early days ==
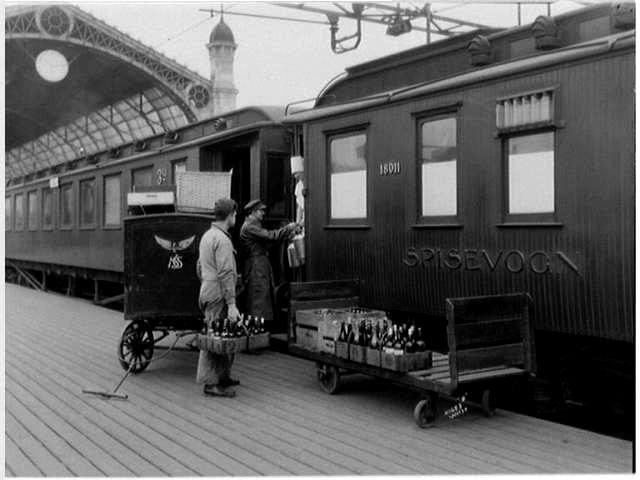
Norsk Spisevognselskap restaurant carriage at Oslo East Station in 1935

In 1916, the executive board of the state railways sought to consolidate the operation of restaurant carriages and the most important station restaurants in Norway into one management. The board stated that they wanted to minimise the conflict of interest between the railway company and the dining-car operator. They also saw centralising operations as a way to allocate a larger share of the revenue to the railway company, and to ensure a high quality of service on new lines. At that time the Sørland Line and Dovre Line were in the planning stages, and the NSB intended to introduce dining services on these upon completion. Oslo East Station and its restaurant were operated by the private Norwegian Trunk Railway. In an agreement signed on 18 September 1918 both railway companies agreed that a new restaurant operator should be controlled by the Norwegian Trunk Railway, although this company had to abide by the NSB's restrictions on restaurant carriages operating on any line.

This model was inspired by a similar solution in Sweden, where a separate dining company had been established; this company paid the railway company part of its revenue and a fixed fee per restaurant carriage. The Swedish model included the operation of station restaurants at locations where the restaurant carriages would have depots. On 21 December 1918, A.S Norsk Spisevognselskap was established with a share capital of 200,000 Norwegian krone (NOK). It had 20 shares; 17 were owned by the Trunk Railway, and one by each of three directors: Waldemar Stoud Platou, Gotfred Furuholmen and Christian Emil Stoud Platou—the former represented the Trunk Railway and the latter was director-general of the NSB. In January 1919, Waldemar Platou was appointed chair and Christiansen managing director. The company took over Christiansen's four restaurant carriages and the restaurant at Oslo Ø on 1 April 1919.

On 2 February 1926, Parliament voted to nationalise the Trunk Railway. During the debate, the organisation of Spisevognselskapet was criticised; with the nationalisation, the state became the sole owner of Spisevognselskapet. On 31 March 1927, the Ministry of Labour advised that the company remain a state-owned limited company; the minority in parliament wanted a state enterprise. In the 1930s, Sigurd Astrup was managing director of Norsk Spisevognselskap. In 1948, Erling Mossige was appointed the same position, and was in turn succeeded by Knut Tvedt in 1960. The company had 75 employees in 1919, and 591 in 1949.

== Restaurant carriages ==
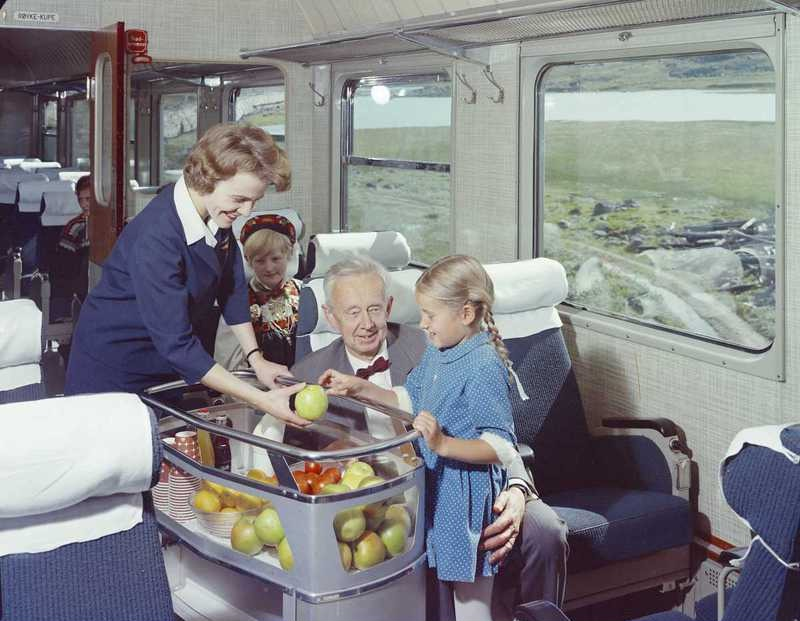
Trolley service in 1964 on the Bergen Line

The restaurant carriages of the NSS were open to everyone, but dining was so expensive that usually only passengers travelling in first class used the service. Usually, three or four dishes were offered in the restaurant carriages. A four-course dinner cost five Norwegian kroner in the 1920s, which was expensive at the time. Warm dishes, such as soups and sauces, were usually prepared at a small stove in the restaurant carriage's kitchen. On busy days, prepared steaks were delivered from rail depots. Otherwise, the menu consisted largely of fish options, such as halibut, flatfish, cod and even whale sausages. The kitchens were staffed by two maids and one attendant. Blocks of ice were often used instead of refrigerators.

With the opening of the Dovre Line, Spisevognselskapet established dining-car service on 25 June 1921. In 1921 a train ride from Kristiania to Trondheim lasted approximately 15 hours, and the average waiting time at each station was between 10 and 15 minutes. On 1 July 1925 dining service was introduced on the Valdres Line, from 1 July 1926 on the Brevik Line, from May 1934 on the Nordland Line and from 15 May 1936 on the Røros Line. In 1948 210,000 meals were served on board, in addition to sandwiches and drinks. The company also offered a light breakfast on night trains on the Kongsvinger, Østfold and Dovre lines. During the Second World War, dining-car service was discontinued.

After the war trains faced competition from aviation and automobiles, and serving trolleys were installed on Norwegian trains. In 1965 cart service on trains was centralised and standardised; food service was faster, and prices were lowered. In the 1970s cafeteria cars were used, where passengers could serve themselves.

== Restaurants ==
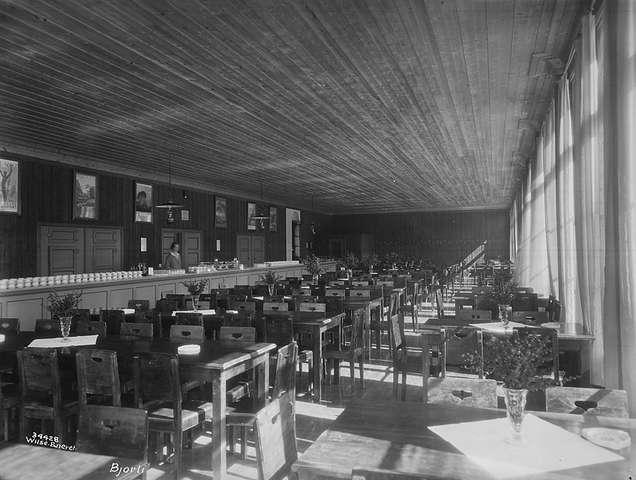
Restaurant at Bjorli Station

NSS derived most of its revenue from the operation of restaurants at railway stations; in 1939, this amounted to 80%. Initially, the company operated the restaurant at Oslo Ø; from 1921, it also took over operation of the restaurants at Oslo West Station, Hamar, Koppang, Opdal and Elverum. The following year, four more restaurants were added: Støren, Myrdal, Dokka and Hell. NSS also established its first kiosk, at Bergen Station. In 1923, the company was allowed to take over all restaurants in the railway districts of Oslo and Hamar; by 1925, it had taken over operation of the restaurants at Lillehammer, Hønefoss, Jessheim, Kornsjø, Halden, Ski, Eidsvoll, Otta, Dombås, Åndalsnes, Kongsvinger, Trondheim, Rena, Roa, Ringebu, Bjorli and Finse.

After this NSS decided not to obtain many additional restaurants, as it did not see value in such a strategy. From 1930 through 1934 the company took over restaurants at Ål, Jaren, Lillestrøm and Tønsberg, along with dining service on the steamship Skibladner, which ran on Mjøsa. During the first half of the 1940s it again acquired new restaurants, including the one at Kristiansand Station. In 1940 and 1941 the company made a solid profit, but lack of food from 1942 onwards transformed the profit to a loss. During the late 1940s NSS also took over the restaurants at Drammen and Sarpsborg, as well as the one at Oslo Airport, Fornebu.

== Hotels ==
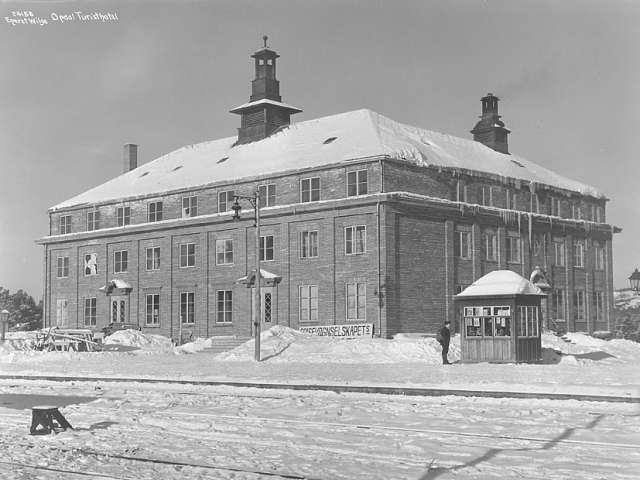
Hotel at Oppdal Station

In 1919 the Norwegian Trunk Railway operated one hotel, which was built as part of Eidsvoll Station. Operation of the 20-room hotel was taken over by Spisevognselskapet on 14 October 1924. NSB was at the time building the Dovre Line between Oslo and Trondheim, and was considering establishing hotels where the line passed through Dovrefjell. Both Hjerkinn and Fokkstua were considered, but these areas were served by other operators. Instead, Spisevognselskapet established the Oppdal Tourist Hotel adjacent to Oppdal Station and it opened on 28 June 1924. The 60-bed hotel had a floor area of 605 square metres (6,510 sq ft) and was marketed as a tourist destination, with bobsleigh and curling during the winter and tennis and croquet in summer. The hotel was closed for part of 1929, because the municipality would not allow it to serve alcoholic beverages.

In Oslo, the company had its offices and workings spread around town. The main depot was at the East Station; the head office was at Fred. Olsens gate 21 from 1919 to 1921, at Kongens gate 29 until 1932, and at Tollbodgaten 24 until 1938. Management wanted to centralise both a new depot and administrative offices at a single location close to the railway station, preferably co-located with a hotel. In 1936 work began on a hotel at Jernbanetorget, but the project was cancelled. The proposed hotel would have had 100 rooms across the street from Oslo Ø. However, the plans were blocked by Parliament (which was opposed to the state railway operating hotels). Instead, the administration moved into Nylandsveien 10, in a new building built on a lot owned by NSB.

In Bergen the company established Hotel Terminus Bergen along with other investors, but the hotel failed to make money. In the late 1940s the company bought Grand Hotell Bellevue in Ålesund, and later operated Saltfjellet Tourist Hotel for a short period. In 1952, Oslo Municipality's Viking Hotel was completed, and Spisevognselskapet was selected as the operator. It remained the hotel's operator until 1976 when the government sold it to Eiendomsinvest, which outbid Spisevognselskapet by several million kroner.

== Dissolution ==
Narvesen had an exclusive agreement with NSB to operate newsagent's shops at all railway stations, except in stations with restaurants, which were operated by Spisevognselskapet. Narvesen had a near-monopoly on newsagents in Norway, and rented facilities in many public places. The owners of Narvesen intended to create a foundation to obtain the company; when plans for this started in 1972, they had difficulties finding a way to transfer shares to the foundation without having to pay tax on the transaction. However, the tax laws permitted a tax-free transaction if it was part of a restructuring. A merger with Spisevognselskapet would be considered a restructuring, and in 1974 Fritt Ord was established to take over Narvesen's owners' share of the company. The agreement between Narvesen and NSB was made in July 1974; in December it was passed by Parliament, although the Conservative Party and Progress Party voted against the merger. A.S Narvesen–Spisevognselskapet was established on 1 January 1975. Fritt Ord owned 50% of the new company and NSB 41%. It assumed the Narvesen name in 1979.

By the late 1980s, the company had sold all its hotel operations. The merged company retained the obligation to operate dining services on the trains, which put them in need of considerable subsidies from NSB. In 1988, NSB decided to organize the operation of the dining services through tendered contracts; the first contract (from 1990 through 1995) was won by TogService, a Narvesen subsidiary. The owners had an agreement that neither could sell without the approval of the other. In 1995 NSB sold its shares with Fritt Ord's approval, and the company was listed on the Oslo Stock Exchange.

In 1999, Fritt Ord reduced its stock share in Narvesen from 51% to 34%. In the fall of 2000, Fritt Ord accepted a proposal to merge Narvesen with the Reitan Group. The merged company was named ReitanNarvesen; Fritt Ord held 16.2% of its shares. In November 2001 Fritt Ord sold its shares of ReitanNarvesen, which was renamed Reitan Handel and delisted from the Oslo Stock Exchange.

== Sources ==
Books and journal articles

- Fritt Ord (1997). Institusjonen Fritt Ord (in Norwegian). Oslo. OCLC 52544757.
- Høgslund, O. (1937). Dovrebanen og Trøndelag. Volume 7 of Norsk Reisebok (in Norwegian) (5th ed.). Norwegian State Railways. OCLC 258361682.
- Just, Carl (1949). A/S Norsk Spisevognselskap 1919–1949 (in Norwegian). Oslo: Norsk Spisevognselskap. OCLC 40310643.
- Ottersland, Per Kristian (2011). "Uten mat og drikke...". Arkivmagasinet (in Norwegian). 11 (1). National Archival Services of Norway: 24–27. ISSN 0801-5449.
- Skedsmo, Finn (1993). Narvesen: Vindu mot verden i 100 år (in Norwegian). Bergen: Narvesen. ISBN 82-7326-023-2.
- Thon, Sverre (1993). Vertskap i Norge (in Norwegian). Oslo: Norsk hotell- og restaurantforbund. ISBN 82-992126-2-6.

News articles and encyclopaedia entries

- Hoffstad, Einar, ed. (1935). "Astrup, Sigurd". Merkantilt biografisk leksikon (in Norwegian) (1st ed.). Oslo: Yrkesforlaget. p. 42.
- "Hotellbygd i særklasse". Adresseavisen (in Norwegian). 8 August 2009. p. 15.
- Isaksen, Bjørn (21 March 2017). "Fra Statsarkivet: Med hvalpølse på menyen". 3600.no.
- "Oppdal har urealiserte hotellplaner nok til en egen hotellkjede". Adresseavisen (in Norwegian). 4 May 2006. p. 17.
- "Reitan Narvesen bytter navn" (in Norwegian). Norwegian News Agency. 18 February 2002.
- "Reitan overtar Narvesen fra Fritt Ord" (in Norwegian). Norwegian News Agency. 15 November 2001.
- "Reitan tar hele kaka" (in Norwegian). Norwegian News Agency. 11 January 2002.
- "Samvirkelaget inn i Viking?". Verdens Gang (in Norwegian). 11 September 1976. p. 16.
- "Slik kom Oppdal på skinner". Adresseavisen (in Norwegian). 19 March 2008. p. 28.
- "Spisevognselskapet fikk Viking Hotell". Verdens Gang (in Norwegian). 2 August 1951. p. 8.
- Steenstrup, Bjørn, ed. (1973). "Mossige, Erling". Hvem er hvem? (in Norwegian) (11th ed.). Oslo: Aschehoug. pp. 393–94. ISBN 82-03-04886-2.
