= Joachim Rønneberg =

Norwegian Army officer and broadcaster

Joachim Holmboe Rønneberg
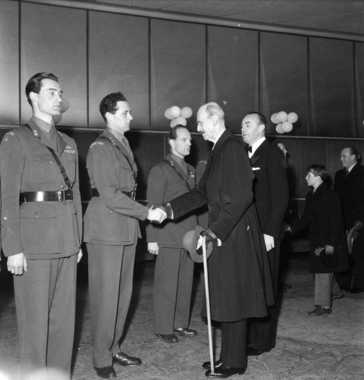
- Joachim Rønneberg (left), Jens Anton Poulsson and Kasper Idland receive King Haakon VII of Norway at the premiere of the film Operation Swallow: The Battle for Heavy Water in Oslo (1948)
- Born: 30 August 1919; Ålesund, Norway
- Died: 21 October 2018 (aged 99); Ålesund, Norway
- Spouse: Liv Foldal (m. 1949)
- Relatives: Alf Rønneberg (father); Anna Krag Sandberg (mother); Erling Rønneberg (brother); Anton Johan Rønneberg (great uncle)
- Military career
- Allegiance: Norway
- Branch: Norwegian Army
- Service years: 1941–1945
- Rank: First Lieutenant
- Unit: Norwegian Independent Company 1
- Conflicts: Norwegian Campaign; Operation Gunnerside
- Awards: (Norway) War Cross with sword; (United Kingdom) Distinguished Service Order; (France) Legion of Honour; (France) Croix de Guerre with palm; (United States) Medal of Freedom with silver palm
- Other work: NRK broadcaster

Joachim Holmboe Rønneberg DSO (30 August 1919 – 21 October 2018) was a Norwegian Army officer and broadcaster. He was known for his resistance work during World War II, most notably commanding Operation Gunnerside, and his post-war war information work.

== Personal life ==
Rønneberg was born in Ålesund, Møre og Romsdal, as the second son of Alf Rønneberg from Ålesund and Anna Krag Sandberg, and a member of the Rønneberg family. He was the brother of Erling Rønneberg, who was a well-known resistance member too, having received British commando training. On the maternal side he was a nephew of Ole Rømer Aagaard Sandberg, and thus a grandnephew of Ole Rømer Aagaard Sandberg, Sr. On the paternal side he was a second great grandson of Carl Rønneberg, and a grandnephew of politician Anton Johan Rønneberg, whose mother was a part of the Holmboe family—hence Joachim's middle name.

During his childhood, he was a member of scout movement. On 19 September 1949, he married Liv Foldal, a crafts teacher born in 1925. He last lived in Ålesund where a statue honouring him made by Håkon Anton Fagerås was unveiled by Princess Astrid at the end of August 2014. Rønneberg died on 21 October 2018.

== Career ==
Rønneberg reported for national service in 1938, being told to report for duty with the surveying department in 1940.

=== World War II ===
World War II broke out when Rønneberg was a young adult, and Norway was occupied by Germany from April 1940. He joined Norwegian Independent Company 1 (NOR.I.C.1) (Norwegian: Kompani Linge) in 1941, having escaped Norway with eight friends by boat to Scotland the same year. He received military training in the United Kingdom, and held the rank of Second Lieutenant.

==== Heavy water sabotage ====
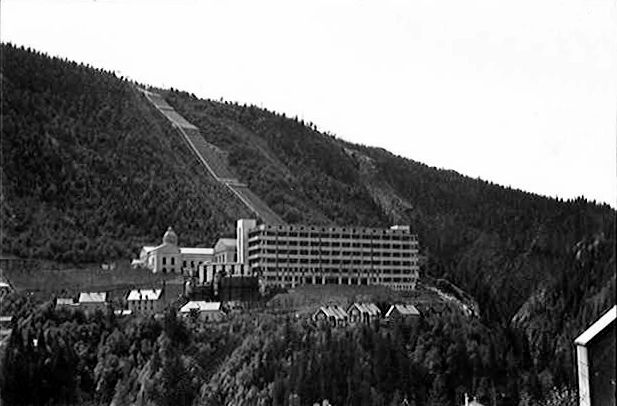
The Vemork hydroelectric plant in 1935. The heavy water was produced in the front building (the Hydrogen Production Plant).

Rønneberg, now a First Lieutenant and put in charge of training, selected and led the six-man Operation Gunnerside team, reinforcing the four-man team Grouse sent in earlier, during the heavy water sabotage action. After landing at a location 45 kilometres (28 mi) from the other team Gunnerside spent five days waiting out an intense blizzard in an uninhabited hunting cabin before meeting up with Grouse. The combined Norwegian team went into action against the Norsk Hydro heavy water production plant in Vemork in 1943, parachuting into the Hardangervidda plateau on 16 February. Rønneberg led the demolition team when the saboteurs, on the night of 27–28 February 1943, entered the Norsk Hydro plant and set explosive charges. The team then escaped from the factory as the explosives went off, without the German guards discovering the saboteurs or indeed noticing that there had been an attack on the plant, probably believing that the heavy snow had set off one of their own land mines. Rønneberg recalled the dawn as they escaped: "It was a mackerel sky, it was a marvellous sunrise. We sat there very tired, very happy. Nobody said anything. That was a very special moment." Although chased by 2,800 German troops, five of the saboteurs, led by Rønneberg, escaped safely to neutral Sweden by way of a 14-day march over a distance of 400 kilometres (250 mi) after the successful completion of their mission. The six other members of the sabotage team hid out in various locations in Norway without being caught by the Germans. Eighteen heavy water cells and around 500 kilograms (1,100 lb) of heavy water were destroyed during the attack, as well as a loss of production of 400 kilograms (880 lb) of heavy water.

After the factory was reported to have been rebuilt in the summer of 1943, a new saboteur attack was planned, but eventually scrapped in favour of an air strike. On 16 November 1943 161 United States Army Air Forces B-17 and B-24 heavy bombers attacked the Vemork heavy water plant, and another 12 bombers the nitrogen plant at nearby Rjukan. The attack had not been cleared with the Norwegian government in exile in London and led to a diplomatic crisis between the Norwegian and other Allied governments. Of particular concern for the Norwegian government was the targeting of the Rjukan nitrogen plant, as it supposedly only produced products for Norwegian agriculture. Twenty-one civilians died in the bombing raid. Following the bombing raid the Germans decided to move the production to Germany, leading the British War Cabinet to order Norwegian saboteur Knut Haukelid to sink the Norwegian ferry SF Hydro carrying the containers of heavy water across Lake Tinn. The ferry was sunk with hidden explosives on 19 February 1944, going down with 15,000 litres (3,300 imp gal) of heavy water and killing 14 Norwegian civilians, ending the struggle for the Norwegian heavy water. The 2015 TV mini-series The Heavy Water War produced by the Norwegian Broadcasting Corporation also portrays Rønneberg's role in the heavy water operations.

The sabotage action against the Vemork plant was portrayed in the Franco-Norwegian 1948 film Operation Swallow: The Battle for Heavy Water, where Rønneberg was portrayed by Norwegian actor Claus Wiese. In 1965 the less-than-accurate American film The Heroes of Telemark, starring Kirk Douglas and Richard Harris, was released by Columbia Pictures. Rønneberg dismissed this film as a "hopeless" portrayal, when he told his memories in 2010 after many years of silence.

==== Other World War II work ====
Rønneberg subsequently commanded other raids against the Germans, including the Fieldfare operation in Sunnmøre, in preparation for attacks against German supply lines in the Romsdal valley. In January 1945 Rønneberg had led a three-man unit of NOR.I.C.1 on a mission to destroy the Stuguflåt railway bridge, blowing up the bridge with a 130-kilogram (290 lb) charge of plastic explosives, putting it out of service for three weeks. The team then escaped without casualties. His service with NOR.I.C.1 ended with the liberation of Norway in 1945.

== Honours and awards ==
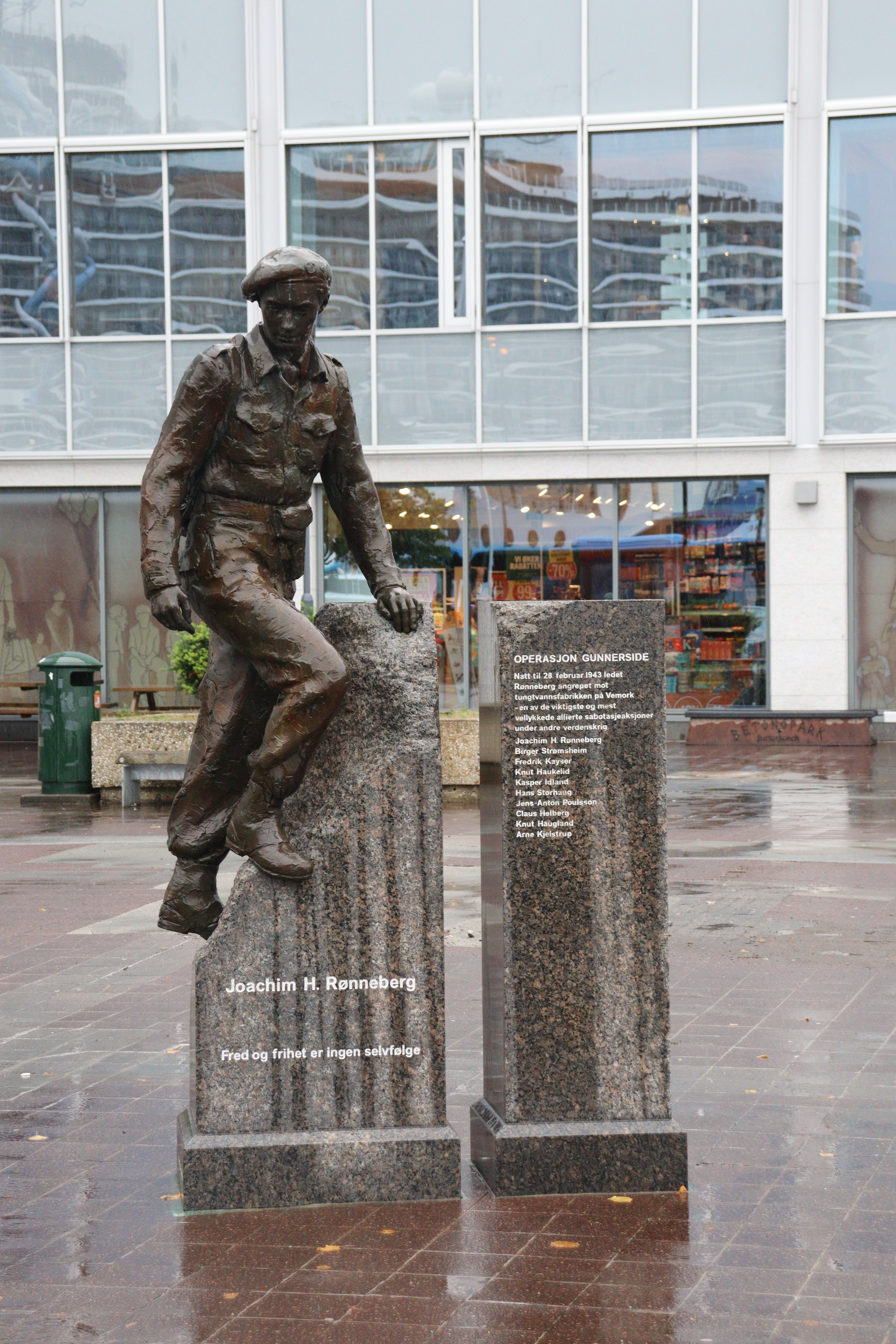
Statue of Joachim Rønneberg in Ålesund.

In 1943, he was awarded Norways's highest decoration for military gallantry, the War Cross with sword. For his war service Rønneberg also received St. Olav's Medal With Oak Branch, Defence Medal 1940–1945 and Haakon VIIs 70th Anniversary Medal. In addition to his Norwegian decorations, he was also decorated by the British with the Distinguished Service Order (DSO), by the Americans with the Medal of Freedom with silver palm and by the French with the Legion of Honour and Croix de Guerre. In 2015, Håkon Anton Fagerås made a statue in bronze of Rønneberg on commission. It was unveiled by Princess Astrid in Ålesund.

=== Post-war career ===
After the war he began a career in broadcasting. He was hired in NRK Ålesund in 1948, was promoted to programme secretary in 1954 and sub-editor in 1977. He retired in 1988. In the 1970s, from 1971, Rønneberg was governor of Rotary International's 128th district. He also participated in the rebuilding of Fieldfare Cabin in the valley Veltedalen in the summer of 1990, where he had hidden out the last year of the war with two other officers from NOR.I.C.1. Fieldfare Cabin today gives an image of Norwegian resistance during the war.

In his later years Rønneberg was involved in war information work, holding lectures for audiences around Norway. He said that he was particularly fond of holding talks for school children. Rønneberg was highly critical of the current situation for the Norwegian military, stating that its capacity for mobilisation was only 9% of the 1990 level. In 1995, Rønneberg, together with fellow World War II resistance leader Gunnar Sønsteby and Norwegian businessman Erling Lorentzen, received the Norwegian-American Chamber of Commerce Achievement Award for "individuals whose outstanding personal accomplishments exemplify the spirit of commitment, perseverance and endeavor that sustains the strong relations between Norway and the United States of America". Rønneberg was a member of the Linge Club, a Norwegian veterans' association, until it was disbanded on 17 October 2007. In April 2013, Rønneberg was presented with a Union Jack during a ceremony at the Special Operations Executive (SOE) monument in London to mark 70 years since the successful Gunnerside mission.

== Bibliography ==
- Milton, Giles (2016). Churchill's Ministry of Ungentlemanly Warfare. John Murray. ISBN 978-1444798982.
- Moland, Arnfinn (1987). Sabotasje i Norge under 2. verdenskrig (in Norwegian). Oslo: Norway's Resistance Museum. ISBN 978-8299102643.
- Voksø, Per (1994). Krigens Dagbok – Norge 1940–1945 (in Norwegian). Oslo: Forlaget Det Beste. ISBN 978-8270102457.
- Myklebust, Gunnar (2011). Tungtvannssabotøren (in Norwegian). Oslo: Aschehoug. ISBN 978-8203293061.
- "WWII Hero Credits Luck and Chance in Foiling Hitler's Nuclear Ambitions". NY Times. 20 November 2015.
- Lewis, Damien (2016). Hunting Hitler's Nukes: The Secret Race to Stop the Nazi Bomb. Quercus Publishing. ISBN 978-1786482082.
