= Rauma Line =

Norwegian railway

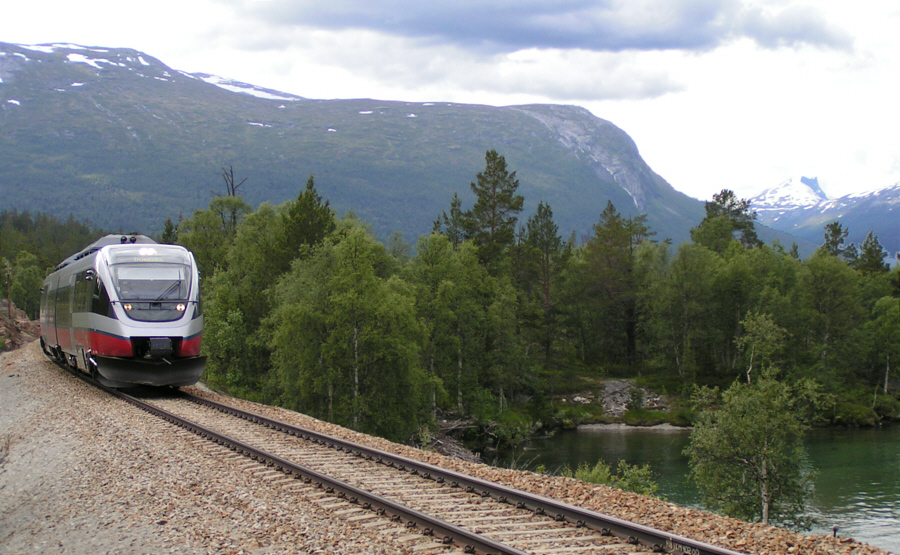

Overview
- Native name: Raumabanen
- Owner: Bane NOR
- Termini: Dombås Station; Åndalsnes Station
- Stations: 5

Service
- Type: Railway
- System: Norwegian Railway
- Operator(s): SJ Norge; CargoNet; OnRail
- Rolling stock: Class 93

History
- Opened: 30 November 1924

Technical
- Line length: 114.2 km (71.0 mi)
- Number of tracks: Single
- Character: Freight and passenger
- Track gauge: 1,435 mm (4 ft 8 1/2 in)
- Electrification: No

The Rauma Line (Norwegian: Raumabanen) is a 114.2 kilometres (71.0 mi) long railway between the town of Åndalsnes (in Rauma Municipality in Møre og Romsdal county), and the village of Dombås (in Dovre Municipality in Innlandet county), in Norway. Running down the Romsdalen valley, the line opened between 1921 and 1924 as a branch of the Dovre Line, which connects to the cities of Oslo and Trondheim. Originally intended as the first stage to connect Ålesund, and possibly also Molde and Kristiansund, no extensions have ever been realized. The unelectrified line is served four times daily with SJ Norge's Class 93. In the summer the Golden Train tourist service operates from Åndalsnes to Bjorli and back twice a day. CargoLink operates a daily freight train.

The line features two horseshoe curves and has a 655 metres (2,149 ft) elevation drop. Among the line's features is the Kylling Bridge and views of the mountainous valley. Five stations remain in use: Dombås, Lesja, Lesjaverk, Bjorli and Åndalsnes. There have been launched plans to replace the line with a high-speed railway.

Freight train service have started up again (as of 2021); previously the freight trains discontinued service in 2018.

== Route ==
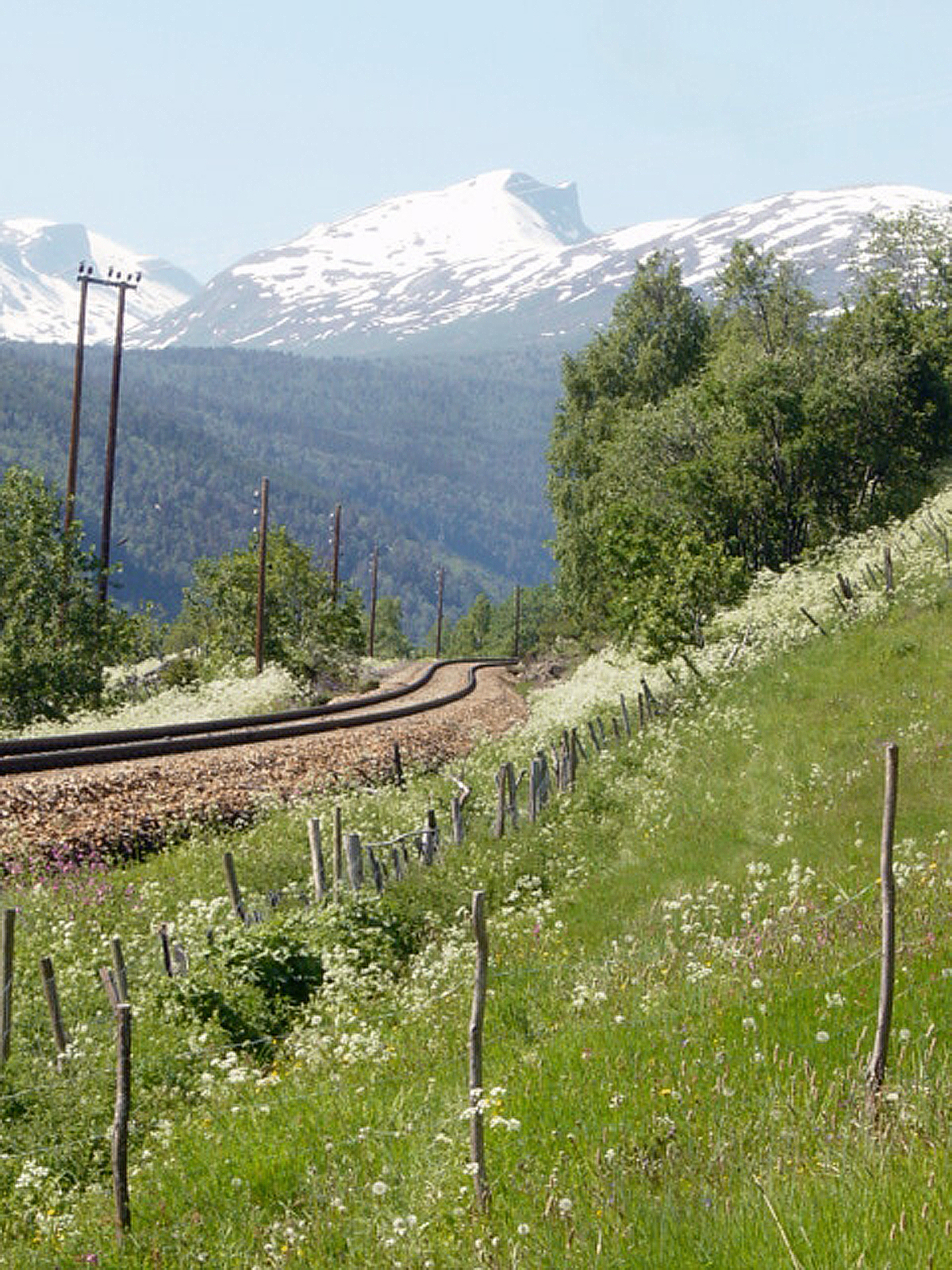
The line with Dønttinden in the background

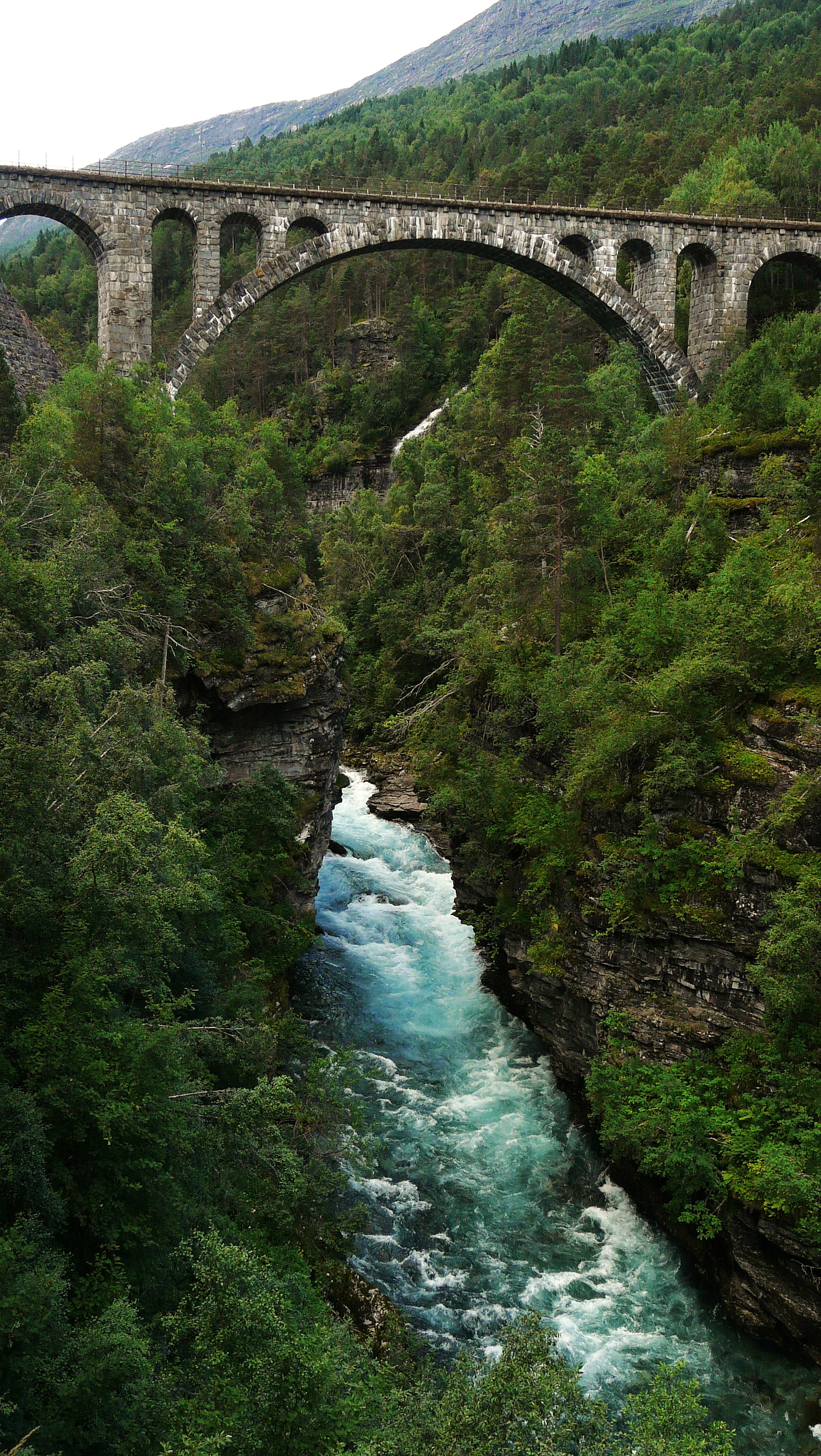
Kylling Bridge

The 114.24 kilometres (70.99 mi) long Rauma Line runs from Dombås Station on the Dovre Line to Åndalsnes Station. Dombås is located at 659 metres (2,162 ft) above mean sea level (AMSL) and the railway falls to 4 metres (13 ft) AMSL at Åndalsnes. The line has standard gauge, has 103 bridges and 5 tunnels, but unlike the Dovre Line is not electrified. The line has five stations still in use. The line is equipped with Global System for Mobile Communications – Railway (GSM-R), but lacks centralized traffic control (CTC). The infrastructure is owned and operated by the Norwegian National Rail Administration.

Dombås is located 343 kilometres (213 mi) from Oslo on the Dovre Line. North of the station, both lines run into each their own tunnel, collectively known as the Dombås Tunnel, with the Rauma Line heading northwest into the flat areas of Lesja Municipality. At 3.6 kilometres (2.2 mi) from Dombås, the line runs across the Jora Bridge, an 85 metres (279 ft) long arch bridge with a main span of 54 metres (177 ft) main span. After passing the now closed and demolished Bottheim Station, the line reaches Lesja Station, which is 17 kilometres (11 mi) from Dombås. Although not normally staffed, it can be if needed for trains to pass. The line then passes the closed Lora Station, before reaching Lesjaverk Station, which is 37 kilometres (23 mi) from Dombås. The next station is Bjorli, which is staffed and located 57 kilometres (35 mi) from Dombås. Located at 575 metres (1,886 ft) AMSL, it serves an Alpine skiing center during the winter.

The next section of railway sees a major drop in elevation. The line crosses the river Rauma on the Stuguflåt Bridge, and then runs through the 1,396 metres (4,580 ft) long Stavem Tunnel. It is constructed as part of a horseshoe curve, and the railway continues, backtracking further down the valley and reaching Verma Station. It is located 75 kilometres (47 mi) from Dombås and at 273 metres (896 ft) elevation; it is normally unstaffed, but is staffed in case trains need to pass. Immediately after the station comes the 480 metres (1,570 ft) long Kylling Tunnel, which puts the railway in the right angle to cross Rauma on the Kylling Bridge. The 76 metres (249 ft) long arch bridge with a 42 metres (138 ft) long main span has a 59 metres (194 ft) clearance to the river below. The section from Verma Station and past Kylling Bridge acts as a new horseshoe curve.

The last part of the line is the most scenic, with excellent views of the valley of Romsdalen, including the Romsdalsalpene, and features such as Trollveggen and Romsdalshorn. The line continues past Flatmark Station, Marstein Station, Romsdalshron Station, runs through the 32 metres (105 ft) long Åk Tunnel before reaching Åndalsnes Station. The station is 457 kilometres (284 mi) from Oslo and serves a town with 3,000 people located on a fjord.

== History ==
=== Planning ===
Following the plans of a railway between Oslo and Trondheim via Dovre, members of parliament from Møre og Romsdal asked the Ministry of the Interior to also make plan for a branch to the coast of Møre og Romsdal. There were made three proposals for a route: via Surnadal to Kristiansund, via Sunndal to Molde and via Romsdalen to Ålesund.

The first official plans for a railway through Romsdalen was made following a meeting in Romsdal County Council in 1872, who appointed a committee to look into the construction of a railway from Mjøsa via Gudbrandsdalen and Romsdalen to Romsdal. Two years later, the council bought shares for 100,000 Norwegian speciedaler (400,000 kr) while municipalities and private investors bought shares for 396,532 specidaler.

In part because of the intense rivalry between the three regions, County Governor Alexander Kielland was forced to call a referendum, which resulted in a majority for the Romsdalen route. However, no specific political decisions was made until 1908, when plans for the line were made part of a national railway plan, approved by the Parliament of Norway on 9 and 10 June. At the time, the line was estimated to cost 8.5 million kr.

On 18 July 1909, the Ministry of Labour gave permission for surveying, which started on 8 August. The Railway Board send a proposal for a plan for the Rauma Line to the ministry on 23 May 1910, which was passed by parliament on 20 July. However, the vote did not include any allocation of money. Additional surveying started on 18 August 1911 and was led by W. Sandberg. This time two alternatives were to be surveyed, one with a maximum gradient of 2.6 percent, and one with 2.0. On 29 June, the government approved a concession for the line to be built as a private railway. The final plan for construction was presented by the Railway Board to the ministry of 17 June 1912, and was passed by parliament on 27 July.

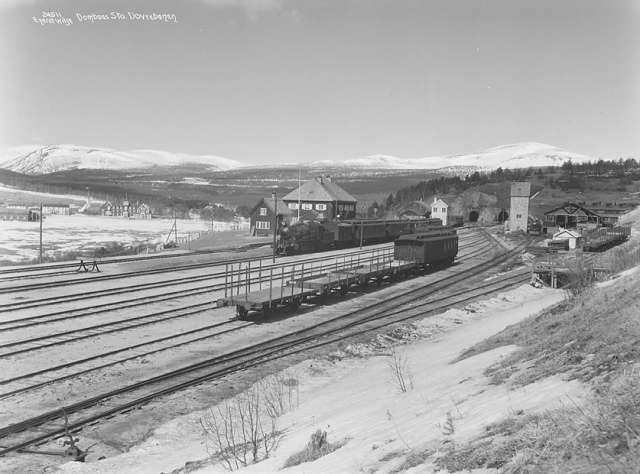
Dombås Station in 1924

=== Construction ===
Construction started on 12 January 1912 at Dombås. The work was divided into four geographic divisions, with offices located at Åndalsnes, Ormheim, Sørsletten and Holaker. The working week consisted of six days, with a ten-hour working day during summer, eight hours during winter and nine hours in spring and autumn. From 1921, a new law reduced the work week to 48 hours. The entire construction took 14,462,247 man-hours. The number of people employed varied between 615 and 550. Most of the workforce consisted of people from other parts of the country, and some foreigners, mostly from Sweden. The navvies were often unmarried and spent large parts of their income on alcohol.

In Åndalsnes, a cutting was made for the line and the earthwork from the cutting was used to create artificial land for the station and port. To secure sufficient water for the locomotives, the municipality built a larger water supply, including a new dam at Bjørmosen, which could secure 120 cubic metres (4,200 cu ft) per year for the railway. The stations were built in wood in a simple, balanced style similar to what was found on the Dovre Line. The buildings were designed in-house by NSB Arkitektkontor; the main architect being Gudmund Hoel, while other major contributors were Bjarte Baastad and Gerhard Fischer. Some minor buildings were reused designs from the Dovre Line by Erik Glosimodt.

The railway opened in three stages: the 56.8 kilometres (35.3 mi) from Dombås to Bjorli on 19 November 1921, and the 18.3 kilometres (11.4 mi) from Bjorli to Verma on 25 November 1923. Until the whole line was taken into use, there was a roundhouse in use at Bjorli. The line was officially opened on 29 November 1924 and regular operations started the next day.

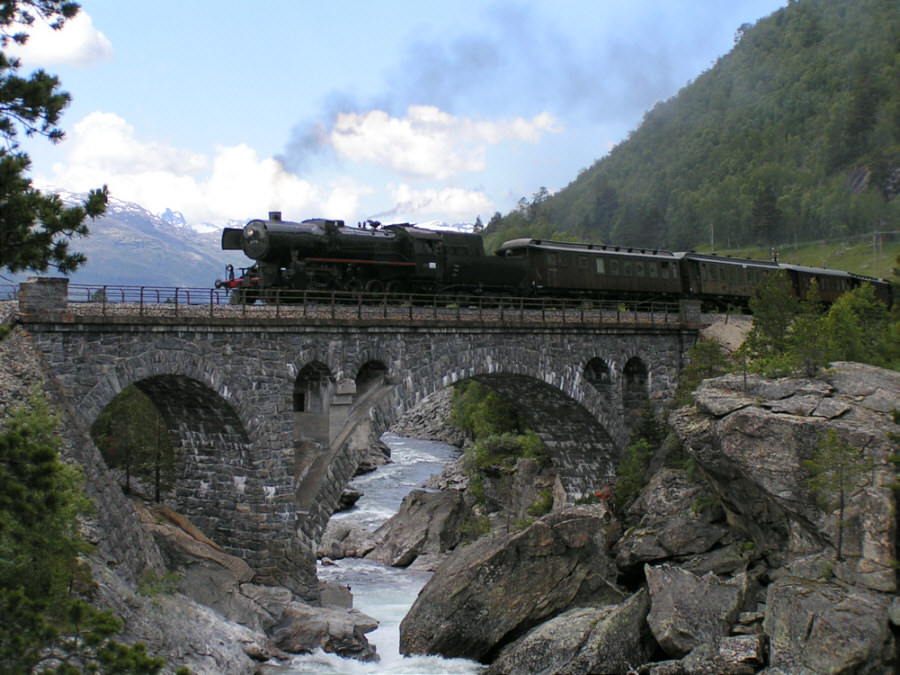
A preserved Class 63 "Great German" on Stuguflåt Bridge

=== Operation ===
Maintenance was originally organized with under two track masters, one in Åndalsnes and one in Dombås, and subdivided into 17 divisions. Each division had two employees, a platelayer foreman and a platelayer, in addition to four seasonal workers during the summer. Each division had a railway-owned house for the family of the two platelayers. Later the areas were merged to a single track master in Åndalsnes. During the Second World War, the line was bombed by Germany. This caused among other things the restaurant at Bjorli to burn down.

In 1923, parliament voted to expend the line to Ålesund, but did not follow up with any grants. The decision was annulled in 1935, but local interests continued to pursue an expansion. However, there was no local consensus for any one line; there was a conflict between the three areas of Sunnmøre, Romsdal and Nordmøre, each who wanted a different branch to their city, and a conflict between building railways and roads. In 1953, the proposals were finally discarded by regional politicians. However, proposals have since regularly been made.

The line played an important role in the World War II in 1940, when Germany attacked Norway ("Operation Weserübung"). Bergen and Trondheim and with a little delay Oslo, were quickly occupied by Germany, but not Åndalsnes, Ålesund and Molde. This allowed British forces to land in this area, and the king, government and the gold reserve could be sent to the United Kingdom.

Regular use of steam locomotives in passenger trains was terminated from 1 June 1958, when Di 3 locomotives were taken into use. From 1 June 1965, steam locomotives were no longer used for freight trains. In 1960, Ålesund Airport, Vigra was opened, and in the following decade also Molde Airport, Årø and Kristiansund Airport, Kvernberget opened. This resulted in a reduction of passengers on the railway, although the rail fares remained considerably lower than air fares. The infrastructure was upgraded between 1973 and 1983 for NOK 70; this included replacing all wooden sleepers with concrete sleepers, and replacing the sand with ballast.

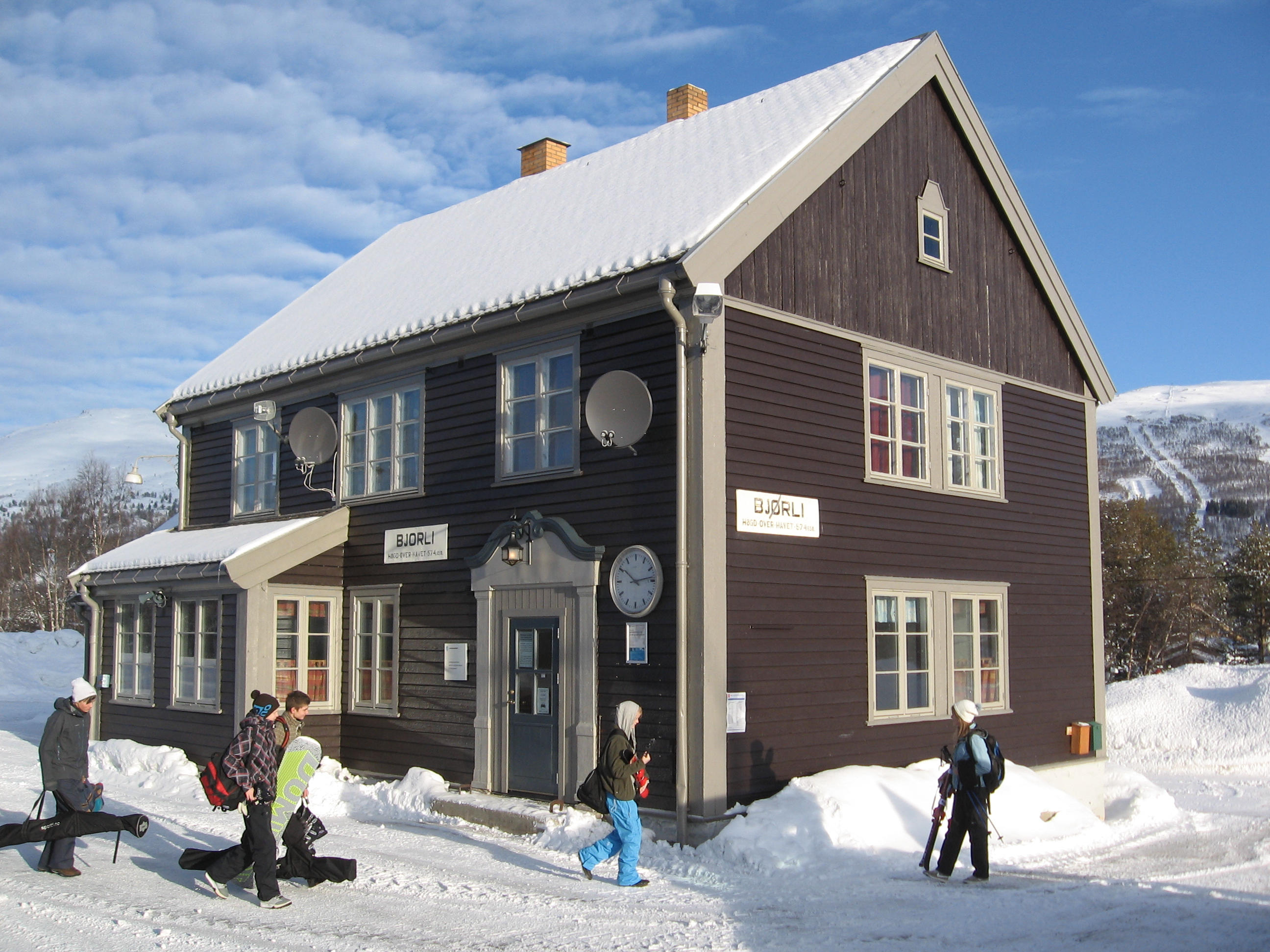
Bjorli Station during winter

In 1996, the government had proposed closing the night train service, after suggestions from NSB. The railway company was losing money on operating the night services, and stated that they needed a subsidy of 8 million kr, or NOK 400 per passenger, to retain the service. That year, the line had a ridership of 108,800, down from 116,500 in 1966. The service was kept after a parliamentarian compromise to convert NSB to a company in exchange for keeping the service.

In 2000, NSB introduced the new two-car Class 93 diesel multiple units on the Rauma Line. In October, the night train service was terminated and replaced by a night express bus. The original seating configuration in Class 93 was for 88 seats, but due to customer complaints about lack of seat pitch, NSB has reconfigured the trains in 2006 to 76 seats. Starting in 2003, NSB and the tourist board in Rauma started cooperating with running tourist trains during the summer. Aimed primarily at tourists arriving by cruise ship at Åndalsnes, the trains use longer time to Dombås, allowing for longer stops underway for passengers to disembark and board to look at various attractions. On special occasions, a steam train is used in the tourist runs.

== Service ==
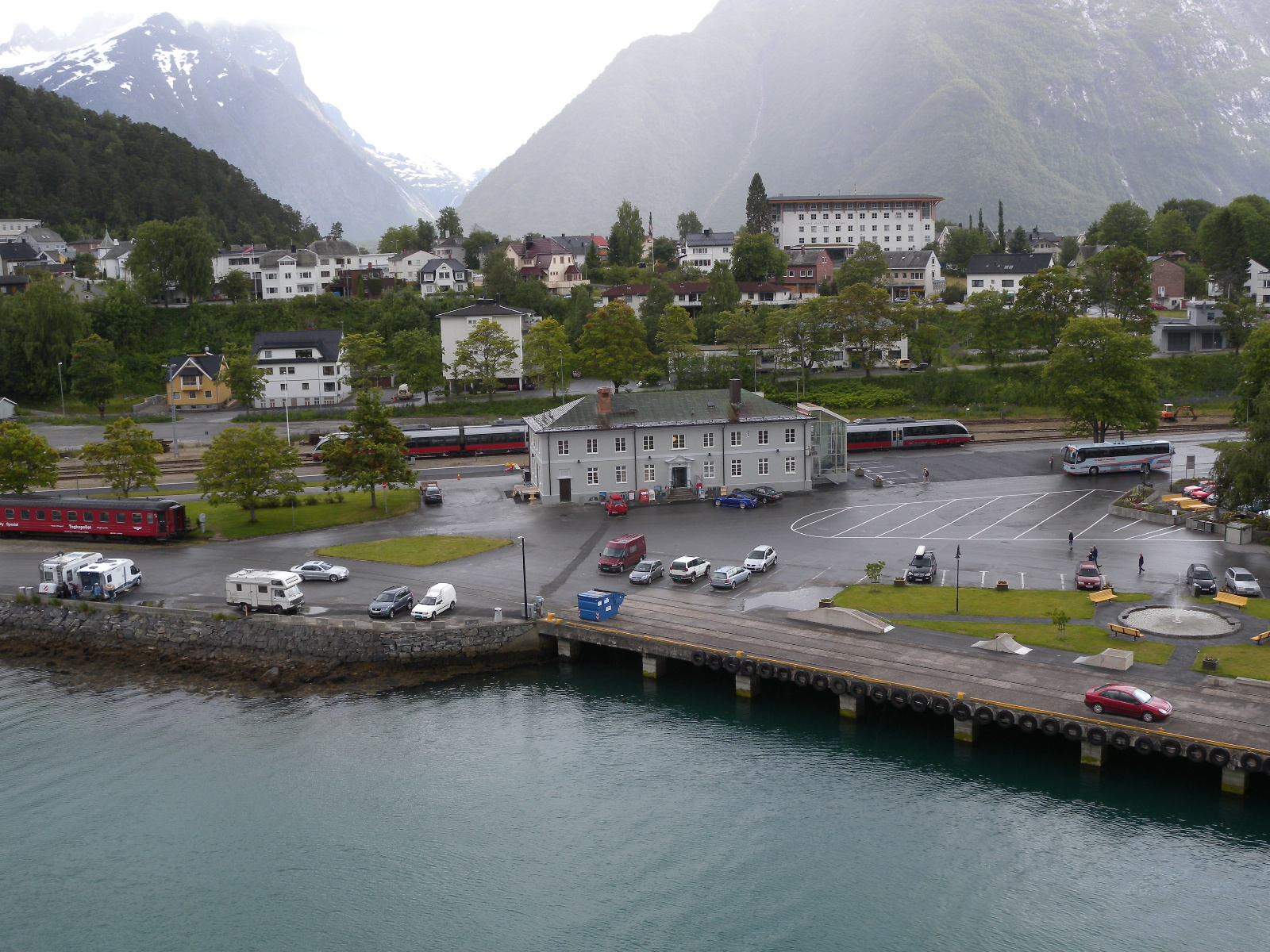
Åndalsnes Station with Class 93 trains

SJ Norge operates passenger train services on the line. Using Class 93 trains, they operate four services in each direction per day. Travel time is 1 hour and 17 minutes, and serves mostly as a feeding service to express trains on the Dovre Line. At Åndalsnes there are coordinating buses to the populated areas on the coast, such as Ålesund and Molde. During the summer, from June through August, NSB operates the trains as tourists trains, involving an audio guide over the speakers, the train driving extra slow past landmarks, and the train stopping altogether at Kylling Bridge and at Trollveggen. The travel time increases to 1 hour and 35 minutes,. CargoLink operates freight trains on the line, with one service per day per direction during the night.

== Future ==
There have been proposals to reduce or eliminate passenger transport on the line. A report by the Institute of Transport Economics in 2004 concluded that the low population density, the lack of termination in a city and the nature of being a branch line with correspondence at Dombås made it impossible to attract sufficient ridership to make operations profitable.

The lobbyist organisation Norsk Bane has paid for an investigation made by Deutsche Bahn which proposes to construct a high-speed railway between Ålesund and Oslo, which would run through Romsdalen. The line would connect to a proposed high-speed line between Oslo and Trondheim at Dombås, but would avoid going through Åndalsnes and instead pass through the village of Bjorli, through the Valldalen valley, before reaching the village of Valldal in Sunnmøre. The branch would be 193 kilometres (120 mi) long, of which 89 kilometres (55 mi) would run in tunnel and 13 kilometres (8 mi) be on bridges and viaducts. It is estimated to cost NOK 30 billion and give a travel time of 2 hours and 33 minutes from Ålesund to Oslo. Because of 1.25 percent gradients, the line is suitable for freight trains. During daytime, freight trains would operate on the line in 160 kilometres per hour (99 mph), while they could operate slower during the night. The proposal calls for twelve trains per direction per day between Ålesund and Oslo, and six trains per day between Ålesund and Trondheim.

The travel time Ålesund–Oslo by bus and train (using the Rauma Line) is (as of 2018) around 7 hours 55 minutes (by car slightly less), and Åndalsnes–Oslo around 5 hours 30 minutes (by car slightly more). Air travel has a leading market share with 606,000 passengers Ålesund–Oslo and 370,000 Molde-Oslo year 2016.

== Driver’s cab documentation ==
Several complete cab rides on the Rauma Line document the scenery along the Rauma River, including the Kylling Bridge and steep mountain sections. Full index:
