= Hilmar Martinus Strøm =

Norwegian politician

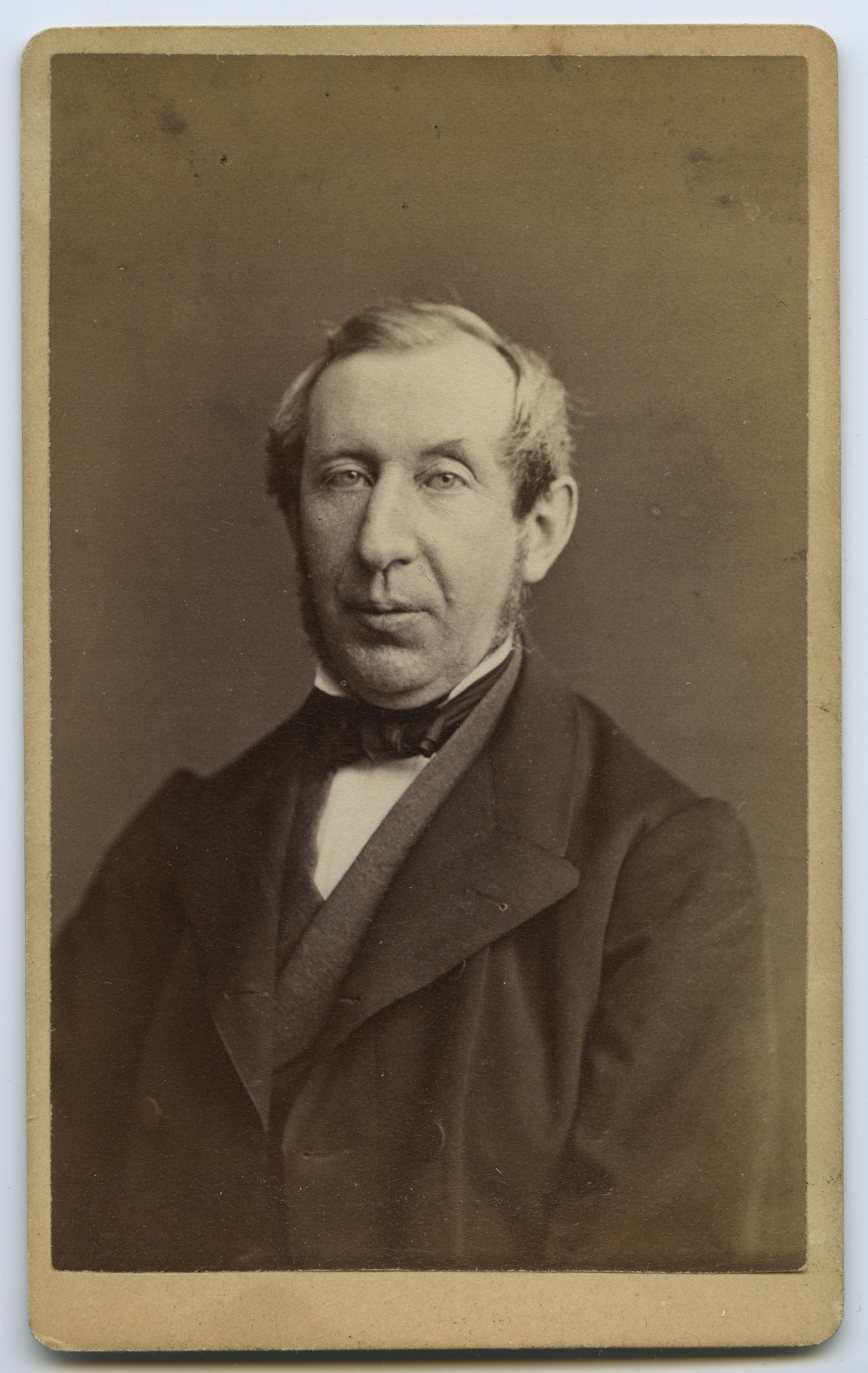
Hilmar Martinus Strøm

Hilmar Martinus Strøm (1817–1897) was a Norwegian politician. He was elected to the Norwegian Parliament in 1859, representing the constituency of Aalesund. He worked as a stipendiary magistrate (byfoged) there. He was later elected in 1862 and 1865.
