= Fieldfare Cabin =

Norwegian military shelter

Coordinates: 62.1597°N 7.7019°E

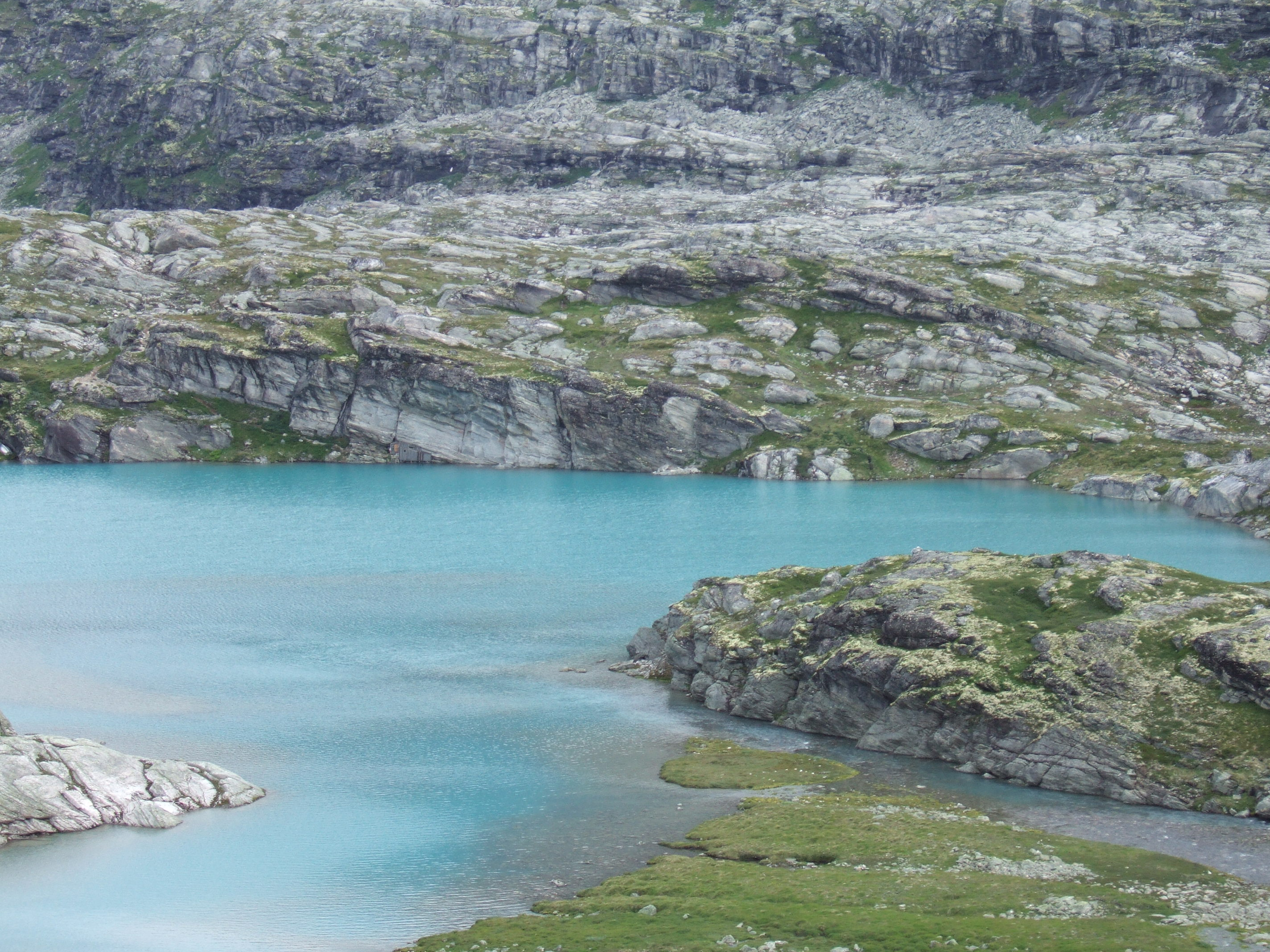
Fjeldfarehytta

Fieldfare cabin (Fieldfarehytta) is a shelter built during the occupation of Norway by Nazi Germany. It is situated in the Tafjordfjella mountains on the northern shore of the Lake Veltdalsvatnet in Sunnmøre, Norway.

The cabin was built during the spring of 1944 by the sabotage team of Joachim Rønneberg, Birger Strømsheim (1911-2012) and Olav Aarsæther (1918- 2006) of the Norwegian Independent Company 1 (Kompani Linge) as part of Operation Fieldfare in Sunnmøre (Fieldfare i Tafjordfjellene på Sunnmøre). The location of the cabin is very remote, as it takes two or three days by foot on rough ground to get there. The team was dropped from Great Britain during World War II. Their assignment was to prepare attacks on German supply lines in valley of Romsdal. Additionally they were to establish a foothold in the mountains close to Dombås, one of the busiest railway-intersections between Oslo and Trondheim. Situated under an overhanging rock to protect it from discovery by aircraft, they used the cabin as a shelter for more than a year during their sabotage actions. It was built with the over-stock of materials used for civil construction of Heimste at Veltdalsvatnet, which had been built in the thirties.

The cabin was rebuilt by Joachim Rønneberg during the summer of 1990. The cabin has a part of the original radio equipment set up and a copy of the log book. The cabin was given to the Ålesund and Sunnmøre branch of the Norwegian Trekking Association and is open today to the public.

== Other sources ==
- Ovrelid, Thor (2005) Operation Fieldfare. Britisk infrastruktursabotasje i Norge 1944-1945 (Årbok for Sunnmøre)
