= Anton Rønneberg =

Norwegian writer, theatre critic, dramaturg and theatre director

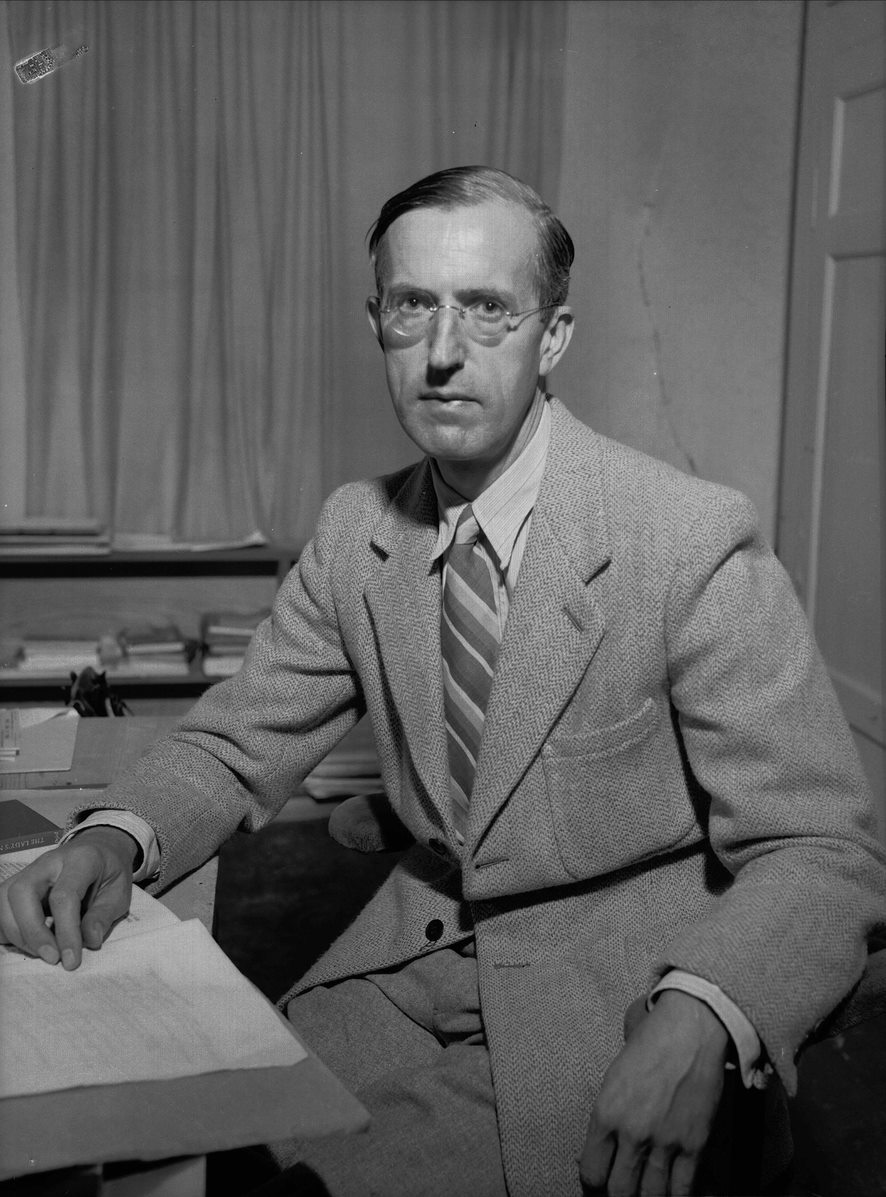
- Anton Rønneberg in 1949
- Born: 9 August 1902; Ålesund, Norway
- Died: 7 May 1989 (aged 86); Oslo, Norway
- Occupations: Theatre director Dramaturg; Theatre critic Theatre historian
- Spouse: Ruth Krefting
- Relatives: Joachim Rønneberg (nephew)
- Awards: Order of the Polar Star; Order of the Crown of Italy

Anton Johan Rønneberg (9 August 1902 – 7 May 1989) was a Norwegian writer, theatre critic, dramaturg and theatre director.

Rønneberg was a theatre critic for several Oslo newspapers: Norges Kommunistblad in 1924, Middagsavisen from 1925 to 1927, Morgenbladet from 1928 to 1930 and Aftenposten. He was the acting theatre director for the National Theatre from 1933 to 1934. He wrote several books, including Teater hjemme og ute (1945), a biography on actress Tore Segelcke (1946), and two volumes on the history of Nationaltheatret.

Cultural offices
Preceded by Halfdan Christensen	Director of the National Theatre (acting); 1933–1934	Succeeded by Johan Henrik Wiers-Jenssen
