= Åndalsnes Station =

Railway station in Rauma, Norway

Åndalsnes
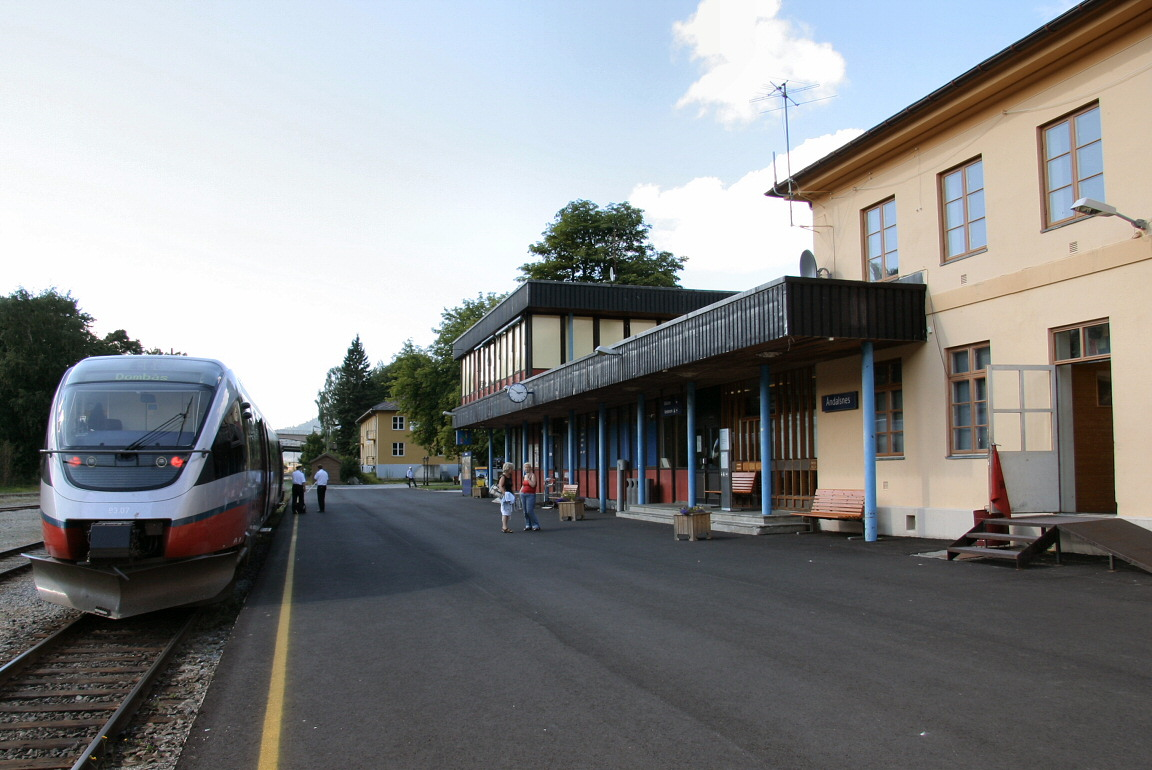
- Class 93 at Åndalsnes

General information
- Location: Åndalsnes, Rauma Municipality; Norway
- Coordinates: 62°34′02″N 7°41′25″E
- Elevation: 4.2 m (14 ft) amsl
- Owner: Bane NOR
- Operator: SJ Norge
- Line: Rauma Line
- Distance: 457.28 km (284.14 mi)
- Connections: Bus: Fram

Construction
- Architect: Gudmund Hoel, NSB Arkitektkontor

History
- Opened: 1924
Location

Åndalsnes Station (Norwegian: Åndalsnes stasjon) is a railway station in the town of Åndalsnes, the administrative centre of Rauma Municipality in Møre og Romsdal county, Norway. It has served as the terminal station of the Rauma Line since the line was extended to Åndalsnes on November 30, 1924. The station was designed by Gudmund Hoel and is located on reclaimed land along Isfjorden. To get the line to the station, a cutting had to be built. In addition to a station building, the station has an engine shed and a bus station; the station building is next to a cruise ship port. It serves four passenger trains per day, and has correspondence by bus onwards to the nearby towns of Molde and Ålesund. The station is staffed and features a chapel within a retired train carriage.

== History ==
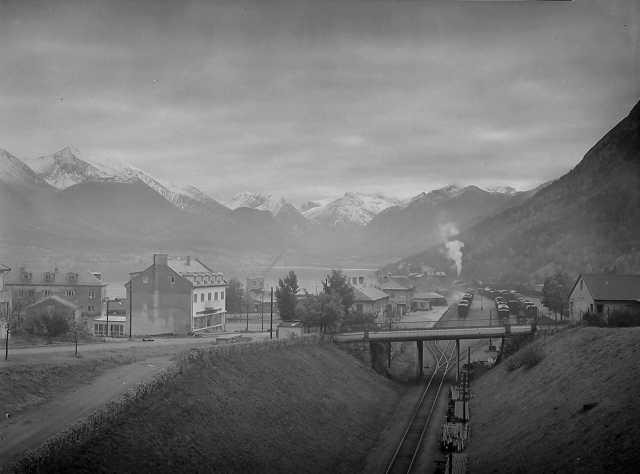
The station in 1948 with the cutting in the foreground

The area where the station is located is built on reclaimed land, as the Åndalsnes side of Isfjorden is sufficiently shallow. The earthwork for the reclaiming was taken from a cutting built to allow the line access to Åndalsnes. The earthwork was transported using temporary 90 and 60 centimetres (35 and 24 in) gauge railways. In 1912, tests were done in the area of the cutting to establish if it should be a cutting or a tunnel. Work with excavation started in 1915, with the cutting up to 16 meters (52 ft) deep. It was necessary to move one house to make room for the line through Åndalsnes. The station building was built in 1923 and 1924, and had an area of 316.2 square meters (3,404 sq ft). It cost 254,836 kr to build. Both the main station building and the auxiliary buildings were designed by Gudmund Hoel of NSB Arkitektkontor, the in-house architecture firm for the Norwegian State Railways, who were responsible for construction.

The station also received an engine shed in natural stone brick. Built from mid to late 1924, it cost 107,000 kr. The classic style brick buildings on the station stuck out from the other station buildings on the Rauma Line. To secure a sufficient water supply for the steam locomotives, a new water pool needed to be built at Bjørmosen. By damming up a pool, it was possible to supply 120 cubic meters (4,200 cu ft) of water per day to the station. This was built by NSB, but was then given free of charge to the municipality who operated it, in exchange for the railway receiving the allocated amount of water free for all eternity. Because of delayed delivery of parts from Germany, the water system was not opened until 10 February 1925. On 29 November 1924, Norsk Spisevognselskap established a restaurant in the station. As one of the larger railway station restaurants in the country, it included an outdoor patio. Åndalsnes Station was opened on 30 November 1924, when the Rauma Line was extended from Verma Station.

The train chapel was opened on 10 June 2003. On 8 June 2011, a renovation project for the station was completed. This included better transfer between trains and buses and cruise ships, a new park, and raising of the platforms. Including upgrades to the track, the upgrades cost 19 million kr. The station building has received an elevator and a renovation of the lobby. The station is considered worthy of preservation and the renovation was done in cooperation with the preservation authorities.

== Facilities ==
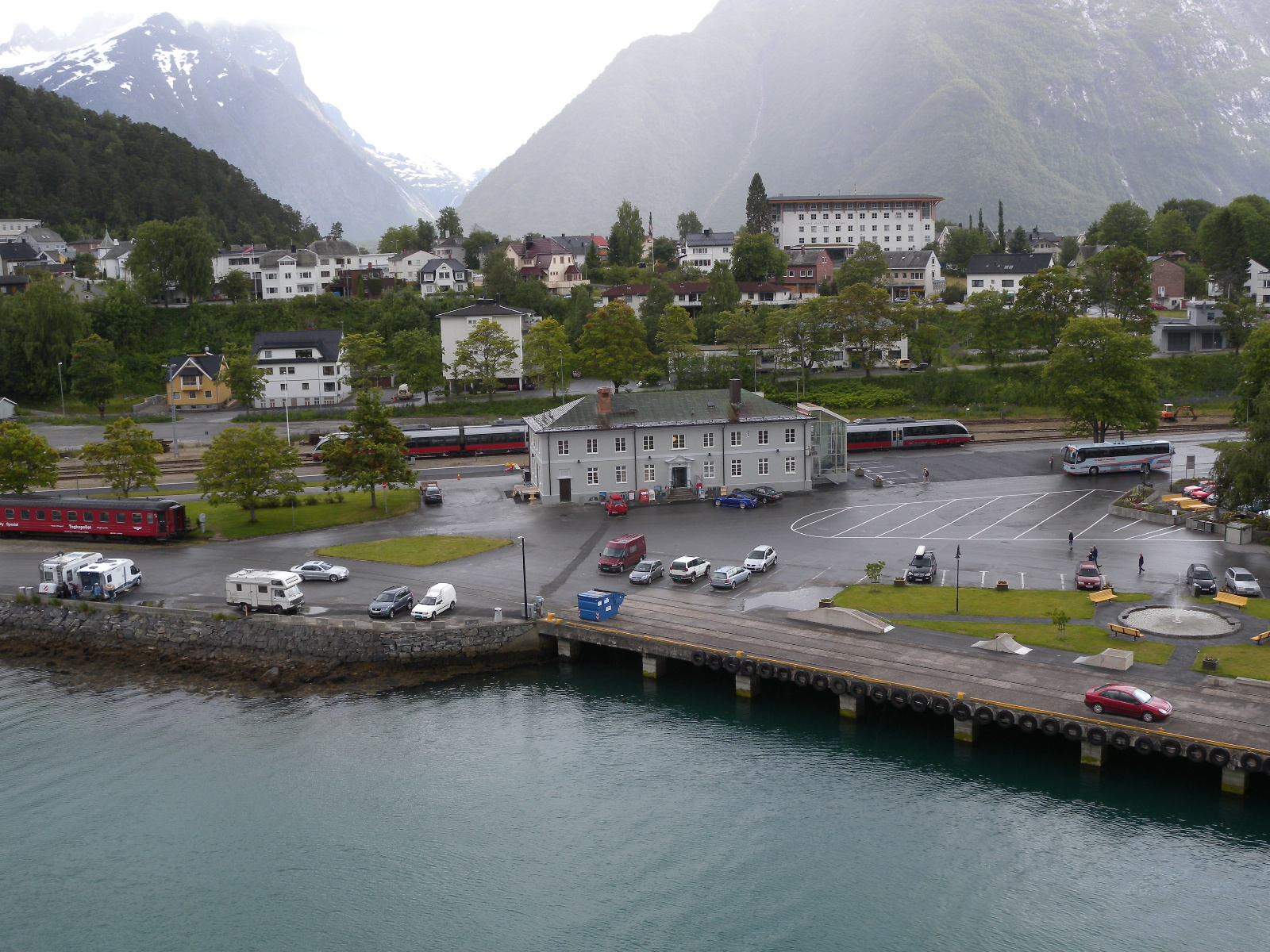
The station area

Åndalsnes Station is located in downtown Åndalsnes at 4 meters (13 ft) above mean sea level and is 457 kilometers (284 mi) from Oslo Central Station. The station building is owned by Rom Eiendom, a subsidiary of NSB, while the infrastructure is owned by the Norwegian National Rail Administration. Åndalsnes Station has a staffed ticket booth and has a waiting room, lockers, a kiosk, a bicycle rack and parking for 15 cars. It is located next to the cruise ship terminal. The part of the station building not used for train operations is rented out to businesses. At the station is a train chapel, a retired B3 carriage which has been converted to a chapel. It has kept the original seating of the train, but there is incorporated an altar. It is run as a cooperation between the Church of Norway, the Salvation Army and the Pentecostal Church.

== Service ==
SJ Norge operates passenger train services on the line. Using Class 93 trains, they operate four services in each direction per day. From the station, there is correspondence with buses to the nearby towns of Ålesund and Molde. During the summer, from June through August, NSB operates the trains as tourists trains, limiting the service from Åndalsnes to Bjorli.

Preceding station			Following station
Bjorli	Rauma Line		Terminus
Preceding station	Regional trains		Following station
Bjorli	R65	Dombås–Åndalsnes	Terminus
