= Dombås Station =

Railway station in Innlandet, Norway

Dombås
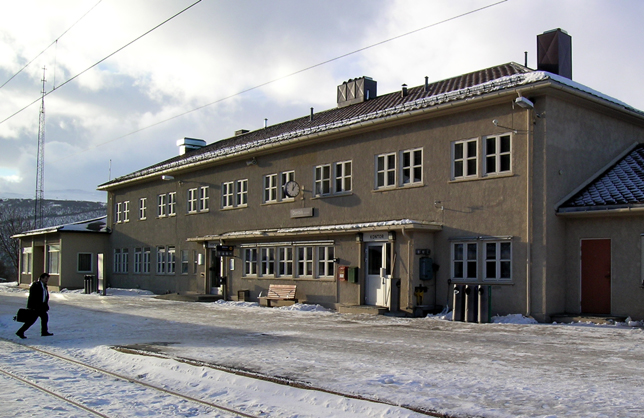

General information
- Location: Dombås, Dovre Municipality; Norway
- Coordinates: 62°4′5″N 9°7′31″E
- Elevation: 659 m (2,162 ft) AMSL
- Owner: Bane NOR
- Operator: SJ Norge, Vy
- Lines: Dovre Line; Rauma Line
- Distance: 343.04 km (213.16 mi)

Other information
- Station code: DOM

History
- Opened: 1913
Location

Dombås Station (Norwegian: Dombås stasjon) is a railway station located at Dombås in Dovre Municipality, Norway. The station is located on the Dovre Line as well as serving as the terminal station for the Rauma Line. The station is served by express trains on the Dovre Line and regional trains on the Rauma Line. The station was built in 1913 when the Dovre Line was extended to Dombås.

The restaurant was taken over by Norsk Spisevognselskap on 15 November 1924. The building burned down on 23 April 1940 during the German occupation of Norway. A kiosk was immediately opened, and remained in use until the new station building and restaurant opened on 1 July 1941.

The first American killed in World War II, Captain Robert M. Losey, lost his life here on April 21, 1940, when a German aircraft bombed the station.

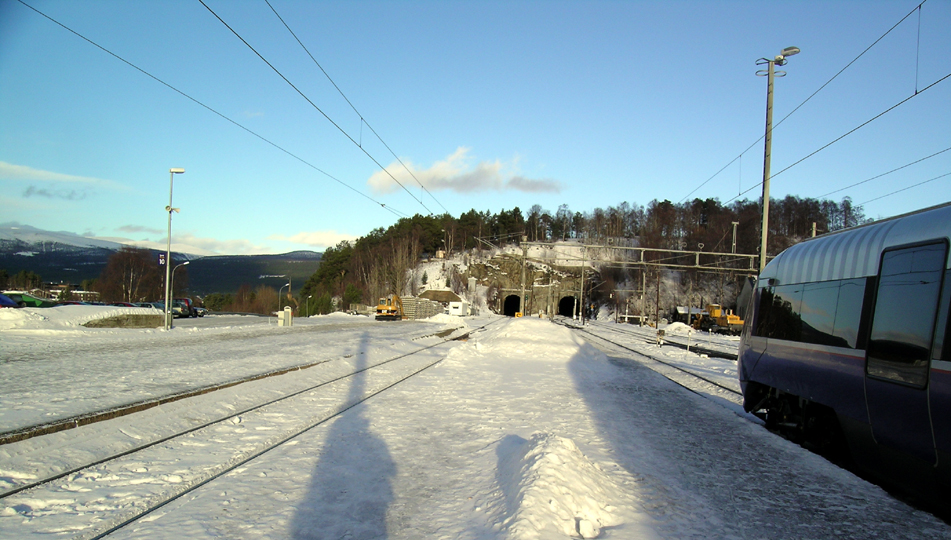
Looking north at Dombås Station, the Dovre Line heads into the right tunnel while the Rauma Line heads into the left tunnel.

Preceding station	Express trains		Following station
Dovre towards Oslo S		F6	Hjerkinn towards Trondheim S
Preceding station	Regional trains		Following station
Terminus	R65	Dombås–Åndalsnes	Lesja
