= Erling Rønneberg =

Norwegian politician (1923–2008)

Erling Rønneberg (9 September 1923 – 8 July 2008) was a Norwegian politician for the Labour Party.

== Biography ==
He was born at Ålesund as the second son of Alf Rønneberg (1894–1969) and Anna Sandberg (1894–1987). He was a grandnephew of Anton Johan Rønneberg. His brother Joachim Rønneberg (1919–2018) was a well-known resistance member.

During the German occupation of Norway (1940–1945) Erling Rønneberg was a member of the Norwegian resistance movement. He was an agent with British commando training. He went to Great Britain and was trained as a radio telegraphist in the Secret Intelligence Service. In 1944 he established the SIS radio station Haga on Torholmen north of Ålesund.

In 1953 Erling Rønneberg moved to Ski in Follo, Norway. He became chief administrative officer (rådmann) there in 1963, and was also mayor of Ski Municipality from 1958. He retired in 1990.

In 1983 he published the memoirs Fra 9.april 1940 til 7.mai 1945. In 1995 he contributed to the anthology Vi valgte det vi ikke kjente.
