= Joachim Holmboe Rønneberg =

Norwegian politician (1851–1929)

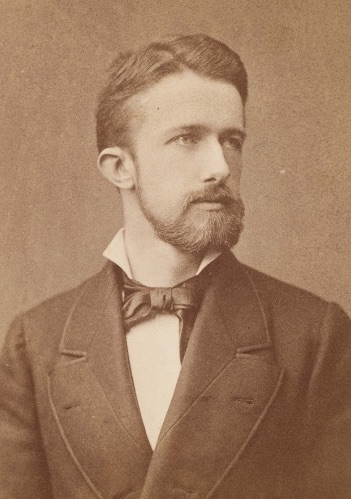
Joachim Holmboe Rønneberg ca. 1880

Joachim Holmboe Rønneberg (2 May 1851 – 16 September 1929) was a Norwegian wholesaler and politician of the Conservative Party.

== Biography ==
He was mayor of Ålesund Municipality in 1896, deputy mayor 1893–1895 and 1897–1901, and deputy member of parliament 1889–1891. He was a member of the Rønneberg family, the leading family and largest employer of Ålesund. He entered the family firm Carl E. Rønneberg & Sønner in 1875, received power of procuration in 1884 and inherited the firm with his younger brother Carl in 1904. After his brother's death in 1912, he led the firm alone.

He was the grandfather of Joachim Rønneberg and the great-grandfather of Joakim Lystad.

== Honours ==
- Knight First Class of the Order of St. Olav
