= Hunderfossen (disambiguation) =

Hunderfossen may refer to:

- Hunderfossen, a village in Lillehammer, Norway
- Hunderfossen Station
- Hunderfossen Familiepark
- Hunderfossen (waterfall)
- Lillehammer Olympic Bobsleigh and Luge Track
