= NSB El 17 =

Norwegian State Railways' class of twelve electric locomotives

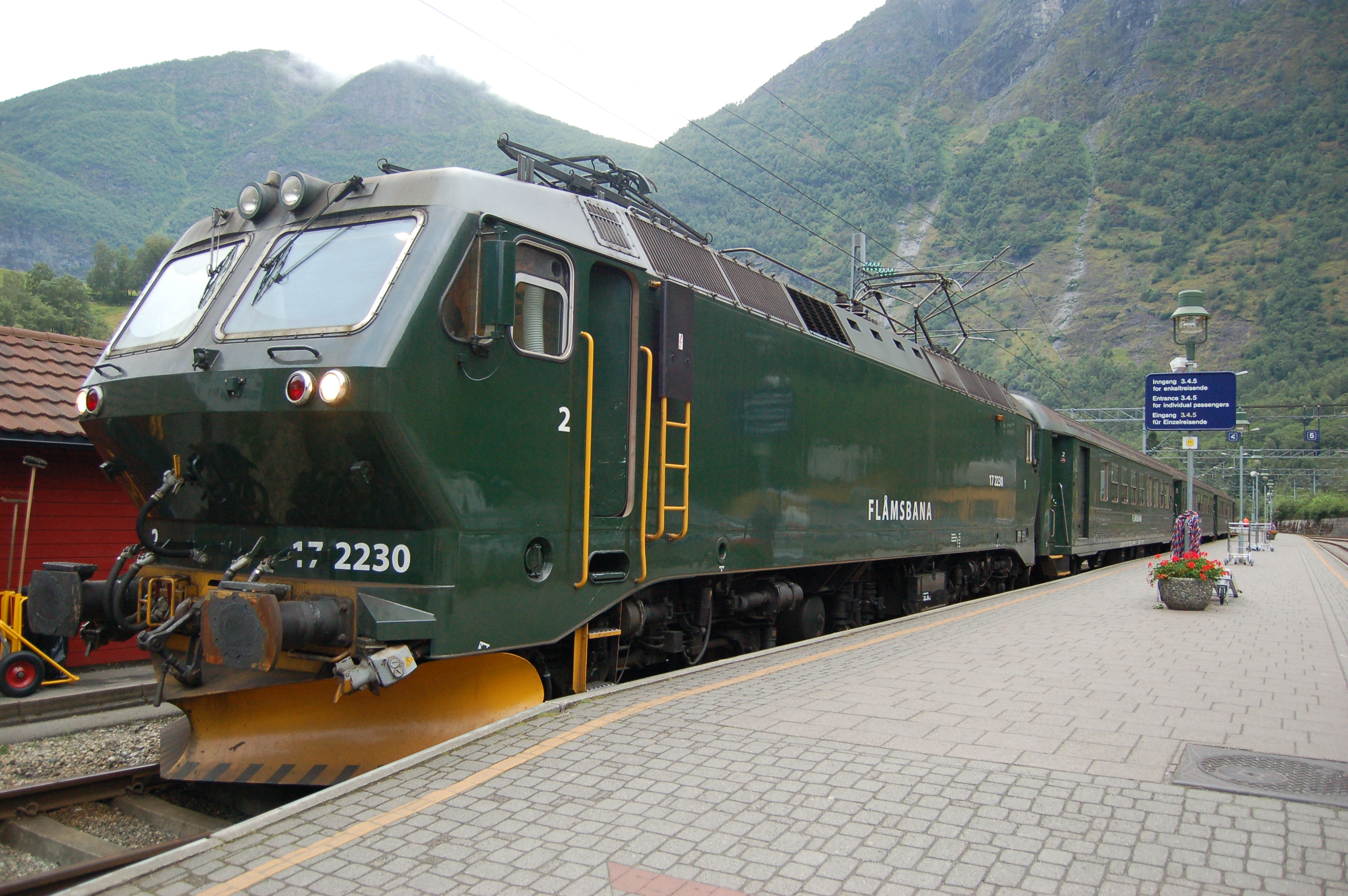
- NSB El 17 2230 on Flåm Line in the line's green livery
Type and origin
- Power type: Electric
- Designer: BBC and Henschel
- Builder: Thyssen-Henschel
- Serial number: H.32467–H.32472; H.32901–H.32906
- Build date: 1982, 1987
- Total produced: 12
Specifications
- Configuration
  - UIC: Bo′Bo′
- Gauge: 1,435 mm (4 ft 8 1/2 in)
- Bogies: Flexifloat (Henschel)
- Wheel diameter: 1,100 mm (43.31 in) (new)
- Wheelbase: 2,600 mm (102.4 in) (bogie)
- Length: 16.3 m (53 ft 6 in)
- Width: 3,040 mm (119.7 in) (car body)
- Height: 4,650 mm (183.1 in) (pantograph in low position)
- Axle load: 16.0 t (15.7 long tons; 17.6 short tons) (17.0 t or 16.7 long tons or 18.7 short tons with barlast)
- Loco weight: 64 t (63 long tons; 71 short tons)
- Electric system/s: 15 kV 16.7 Hz AC Catenary
- Current pickup: Pantograph
- Traction motors: 4 × NEBB BQg 3855
- Loco brake: reostatic, regenerative, shoe
Performance figures
- Maximum speed: 150 km/h (93 mph)
- Power output: 3,000 kW (4,000 hp)
- Tractive effort: 240 kN (54,000 lb_{f})
Career
- Operators: Norwegian State Railways
- Class: El 17
- Number in class: 12
- Numbers: 2221–2232
- Current owner: NSB
- Disposition: Flåm Line

The NSB El 17 is a class of twelve electric locomotives built by Thyssen-Henschel and Norsk Elektrisk & Brown Boveri (NEBB) for the Norwegian State Railways (NSB). The class was built in two batches, the first delivered in 1982 and numbered 2221–2226, and the second delivered in 1987 and numbered 2227–2232. The traction system of the El 17 was based on the DB Class 120 of Germany (BBC, AEG and Siemens) and were among the first in the world to feature three-phase asynchronous motors. The units were ordered to be used on the intercity Bergen, Dovre and Sørland Lines, but were plagued with technical faults (overheating traction equipment, transient voltages, etc.). The unreliability and lack of sufficient power forced NSB to instead use them in the regional Vestfold and Gjøvik Lines. With the delivery of the El 18, the first series was retired or used as shunters. The second series has been used on the Flåm Line since 1998.

The locomotives have a maximum 3,000 kilowatts (4,000 hp) power output and a 240 kN (54,000 lb_{f}) tractive effort, allowing the locomotive to haul a six-car train. They run on a 15 kV 16.7 Hz AC power supply and are capable of operating at 150 km/h (93 mph). The units have a Bo'Bo' wheel arrangement, have regenerative brakes and weigh 64 tonnes (63 long tons; 71 short tons). The series was delivered at the same time as the Di 4 and have some similarities with the class.

== History ==
El 17.2228 and 2227 being tested in Germany (1987)

During the late 1970s, NSB was in need of new rolling stock for their intercity trains. At first electric multiple units were considered, but NSB instead chose to order locomotives and waggons, to have greater operational flexibility. The choice fell on the German DB Class 120, which was the first three-phase asynchronous locomotive in the world in "almost" regular service (prototype 120.0 in test service 1979, the serial version 120.1 from 1986). However, the Norwegian variation was scaled down due to the maximum axle load (16.0 t or 15.7 long tons or 17.6 short tons, Class 120 has 21.0 t or 20.7 long tons or 23.1 short tons) and had a lower power output than the Class 120. Because of this, the El 17 is less powerful than its three predecessors, El 14, El 15 and El 16 (3.0 MW instead of 4.4 MW).

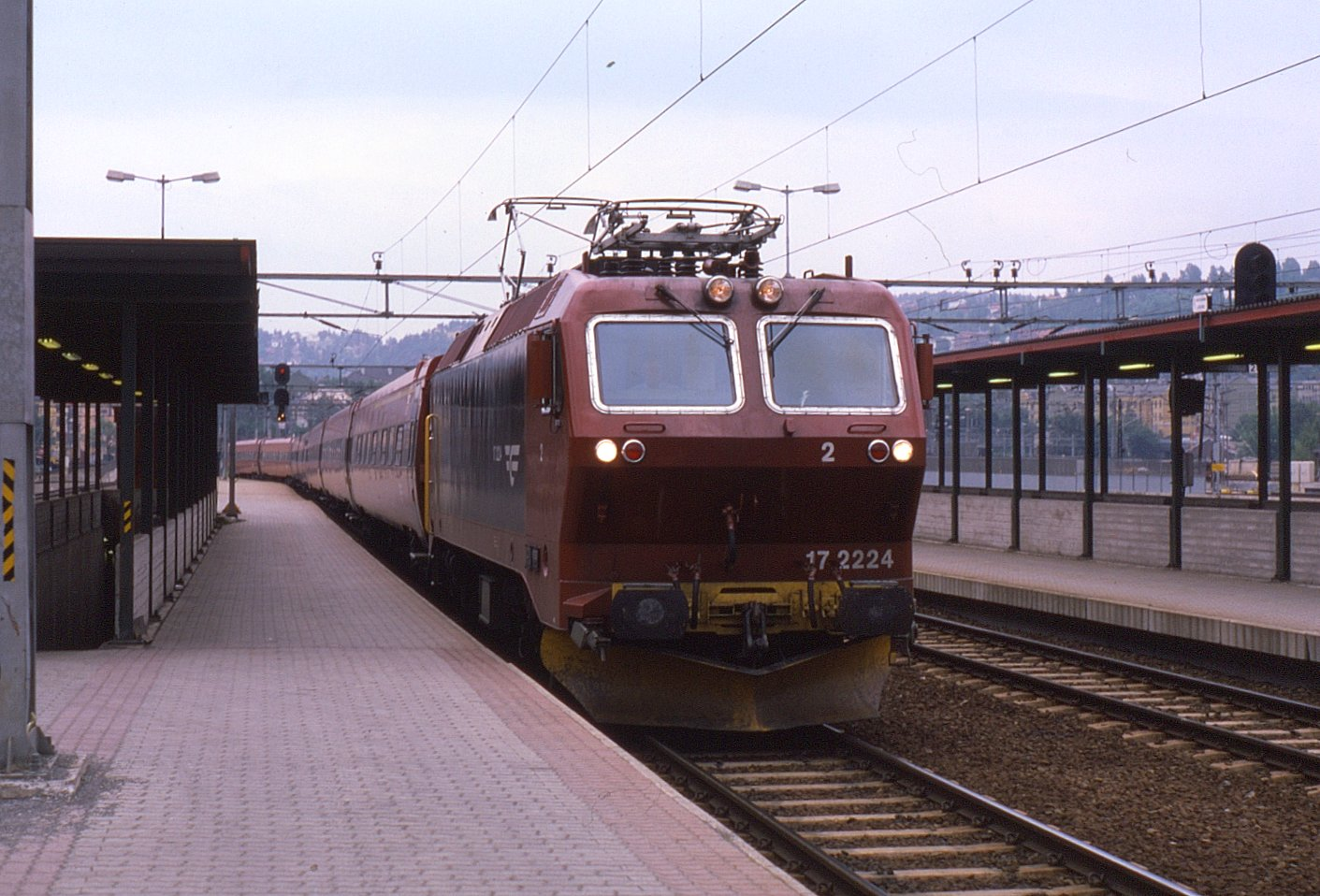
El 17.2224 hauling a train of B7 carriages at Oslo Central Station in 1986

When the order was placed, it was the first Norwegian electric locomotive with the mechanical components built in Germany. At the same time, NSB ordered five six-axle diesel-electric locomotives from Thyssen-Henschel (Mark Di 4), almost the same as the Danish Mark ME 1500. The Di 4/ME 1500 have many similarities to its electric counterpart El 17. The two were planned to have the same rectifiers and motors, but due to weight restrictions the El 17 received the same type as Class 120.

The first six locomotives, numbered 2221–2226, were delivered in 1982. At the same time, the delivery of the B7 passenger cars from Strømmens Verksted was made, and the first train with an El 17 and B7s in regular service operated on the Dovre Line on 14 September 1982. The El 17 was plagued with problems (overheated components, etc.), and NSB quickly decided to operate them in pairs in case one unit should fail. On 6 July 1982, there was a fire in 2224, and it was sent to Thyssen-Henschel to be redesigned. NSB initially placed the unit in service with a round trip from Oslo to Trondheim each day. Due to the technical malfunctions, all the six original trains were rebuilt several times; in the end, they all had different technical solutions.

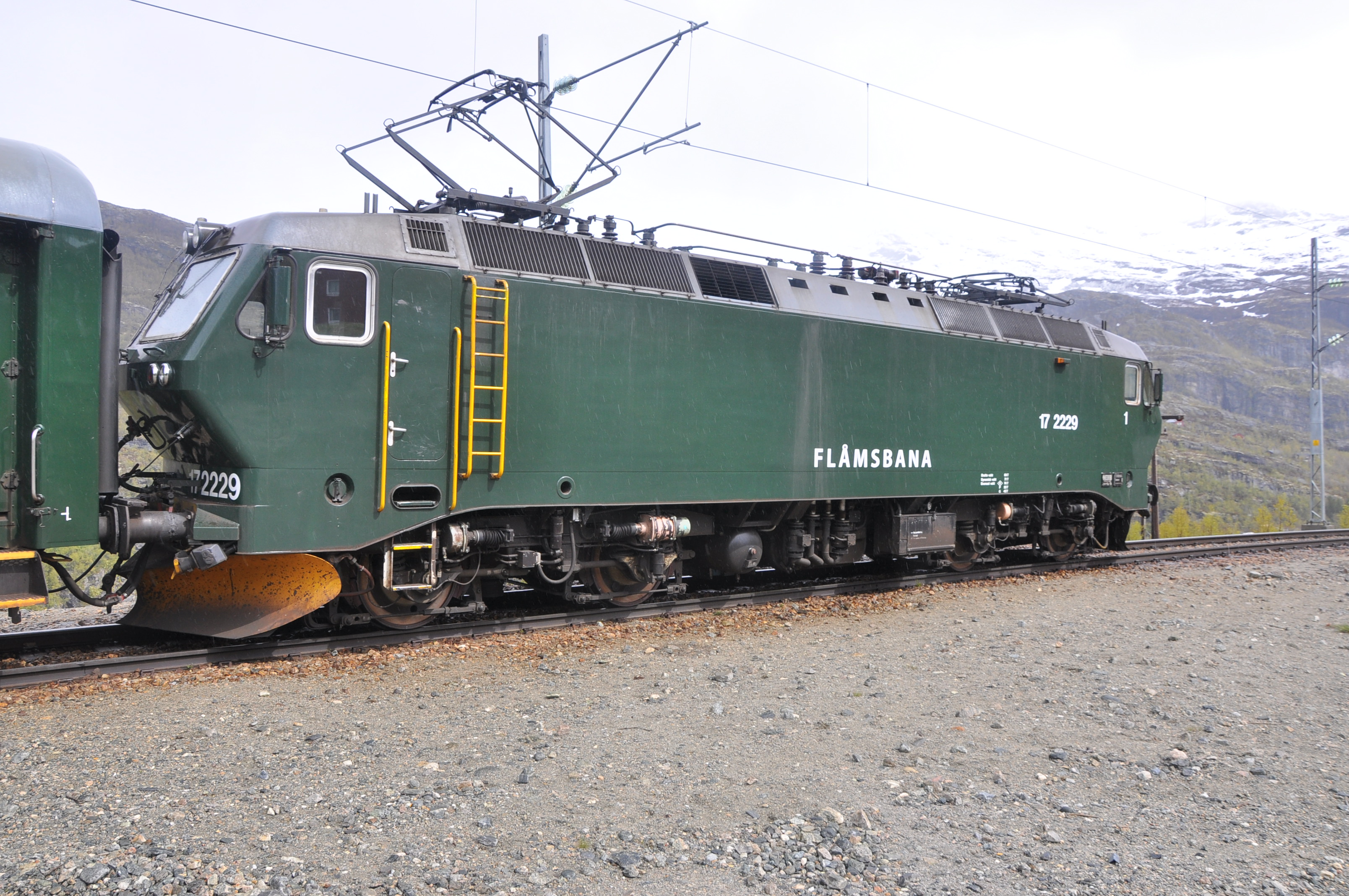
El 17.2229 on the Flåm Line

Eventually NSB felt confident that they had found a technical solution that would be satisfactory, and ordered another six units to allow all trains on the Dovre, Bergen and Sørland Lines to be hauled with the class. Units 2227–2232 were delivered in 1987, and put into regular service on the Sørland Line. Although better than the first series, the second series was also prone to technical problems, and never entered regular service on the Bergen Line. During the 1990s, they were also put into service on the regional rail services on the Vestfold and Gjøvik Lines. The units were never well-liked by NSB, in part because of the bad name the first series had given, and partly because the number of available units was unpredictable. It also took a while for NSB to discover that asynchronous locomotives needed to be operated differently. The locomotives had been designed to haul a six-car train, but NSB regularly needed to haul eight-car trains, and therefore instead used the more powerful El 16.

In the early 1990s, NSB decided that they would replace the intercity trains with the Class 73 tilting multiple unit, and the locomotives for loco-hauled trains with the Swiss-designed El 18 (also with electric equipment from ABB, former BBC). In 1997, no. 2226 was put aside, and scrapped the following year. From 1998, the second series of El 17 was put into service on the Flåm Line, a steep tourist line that connects to the Bergen Line. The units were painted green and connected at each end of a train of six B3 passenger cars. From 2003, the first series was taken out of regular service, and units 2222, 2224 and 2225 were put into shunting service at Lodalen. Unit 2223 was transferred to the Norwegian Railway Museum, where it was put on display.

== Specifications ==
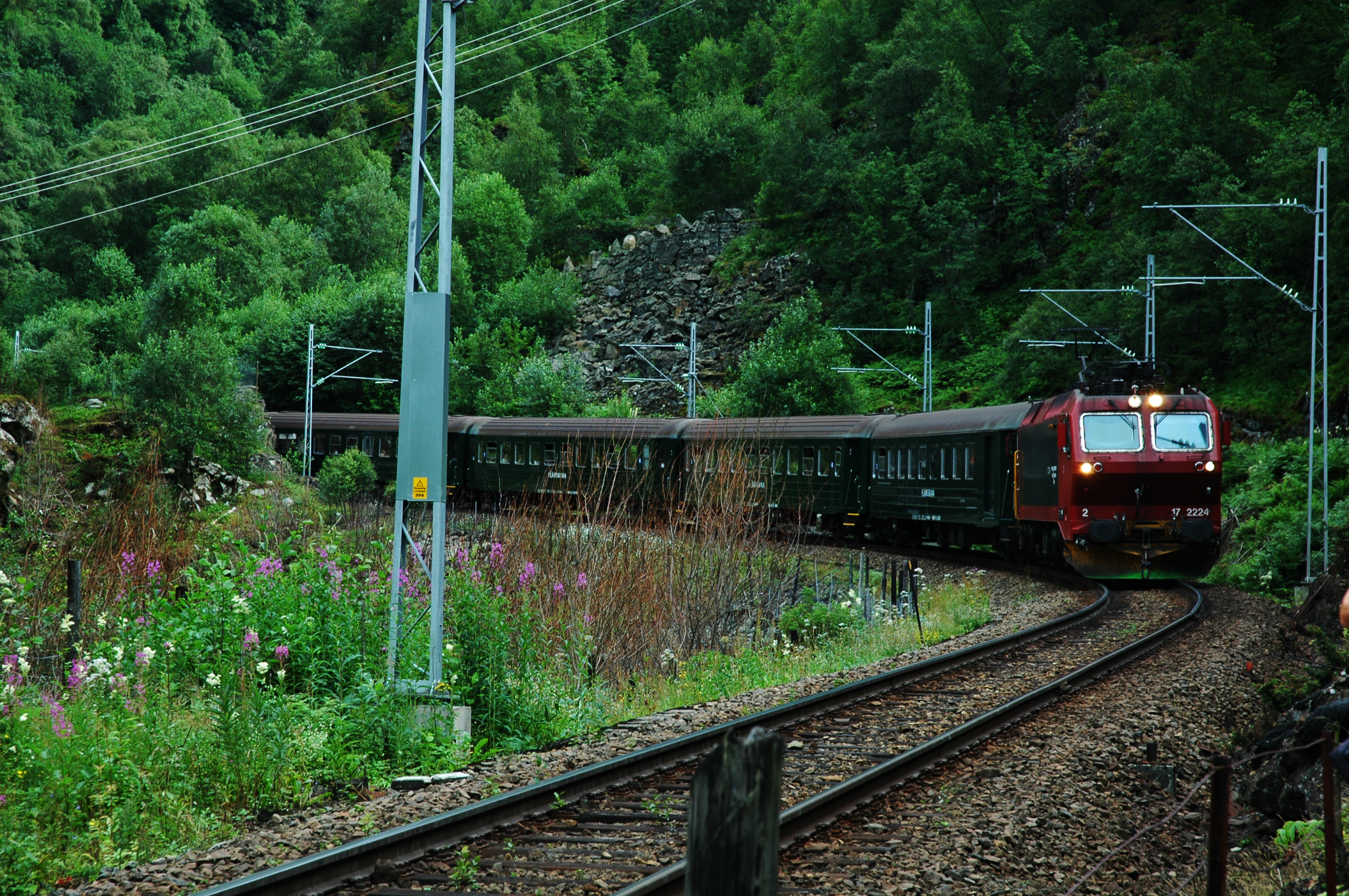
El 17 hauling a train on the Flåm Line, with the locomotive in the original red and black livery

The El 17 was built by the manufacturer Thyssen-Henschel of Germany. The locomotives have three-phase asynchronous motors with a continuous output power of 3,000 kilowatts (4,000 hp), allowing a maximum speed of 150 kilometres per hour (93 mph). The units receive 15 kV 16.7 Hz AC power from a pantograph and are the first class of locomotive for NSB that has regenerative brakes. The electrical equipment was designed by the manufacturer BBC (German plant Mannheim) but built by the Norwegian manufacturer Norsk Elektrisk & Brown Boveri (NEBB). Each locomotive is equipped with four NEBB BQg 3855 motors, giving a Bo'Bo' wheel arrangement and a maximum tractive effort of 240 kilonewtons (54,000 lb_{f}) on dry rails.

The El 17 is an electric locomotive designed for intercity trains, but is also capable of hauling light freight trains. The body is welded as a self-containing construction. The roof (light alloy) sections can be removed, and the locomotives were the first Norwegian locomotives to have a center aisle in the machine room. The locomotives are 16.30 metres (53 ft 6 in) long, have a wheel diameter of 1,100 millimetres (3 ft 7 in) and weigh 64.0 tonnes (63.0 long tons; 70.5 short tons). The locomotives can run in multiple; by using a UIC 568 signalling cable, the locomotives do not need to be adjacent to each other in the train. the El 17 has the unique pointed front that was first used on the El 16, and is also found on the Di 4 and Di 6 classes.
