= Kvam Station =

Railway station in Nord-Fron, Norway

Kvam
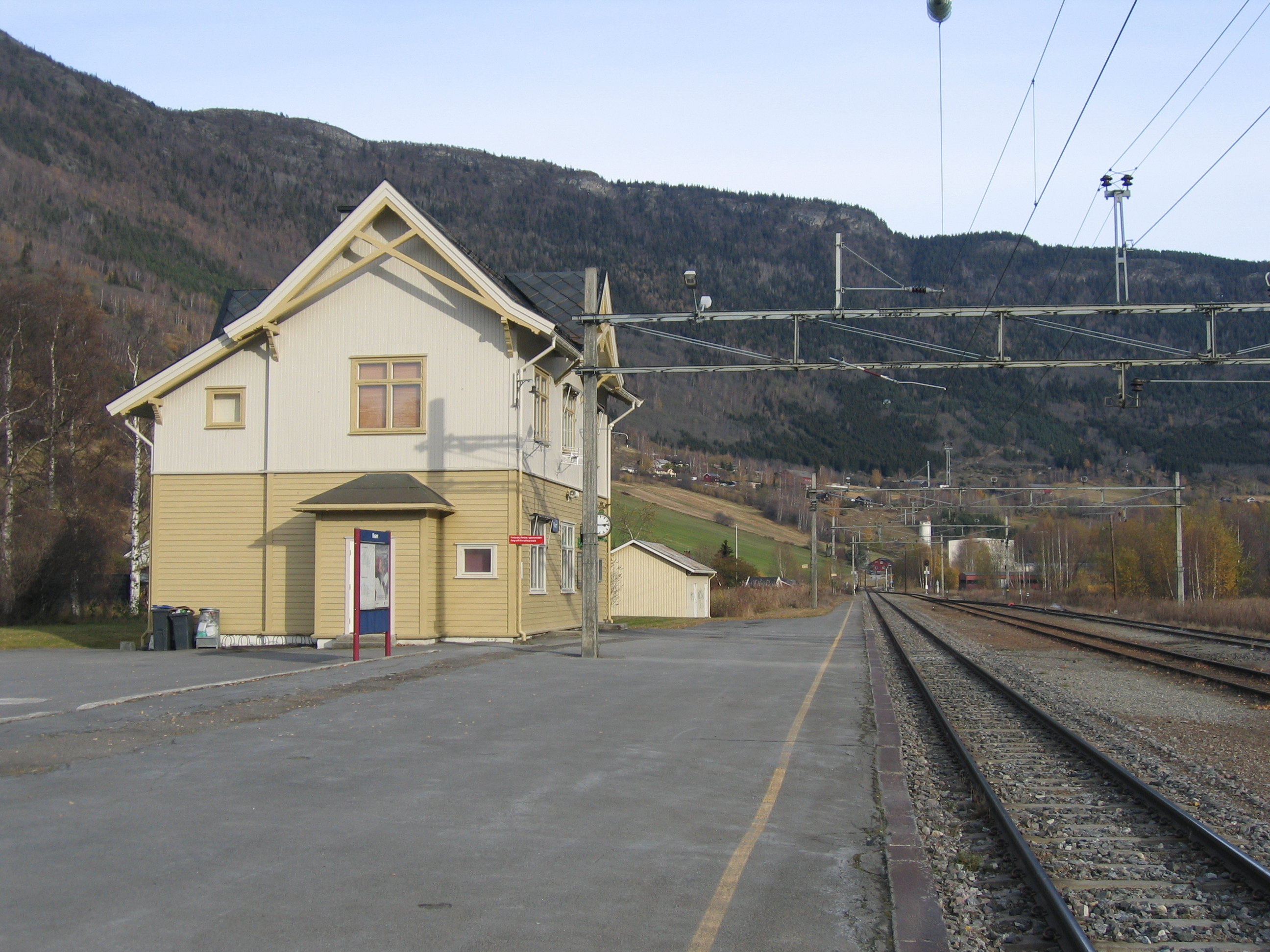

General information
- Location: Kvam, Nord-Fron Municipality; Norway
- Coordinates: 61°39′53.75″N 9°42′5.19″E
- Elevation: 253 m (830 ft) AMSL
- Owner: Bane NOR
- Operator: SJ Norge, Vy
- Line: Dovre Line
- Distance: 276.57 km (171.85 mi)
- Platforms: 1

History
- Opened: 1896
Location

Kvam Station is a railway station located at the village of Kvam in Nord-Fron Municipality in Innlandet county, Norway. The station is located on the Dovre Line and served regional trains with one departure southwards to Lillehammer and one to Oslo each day. Too the north there is one departure to Åndalsnes and one to Dombås each day. The station was opened in 1896 when the Dovre Line was extended from Tretten Station to Otta Station.

Preceding station		Following station
Vinstra	Dovre Line	Otta
