= NSB El 14 =

Class of Norwegian electric locomotives

El 14
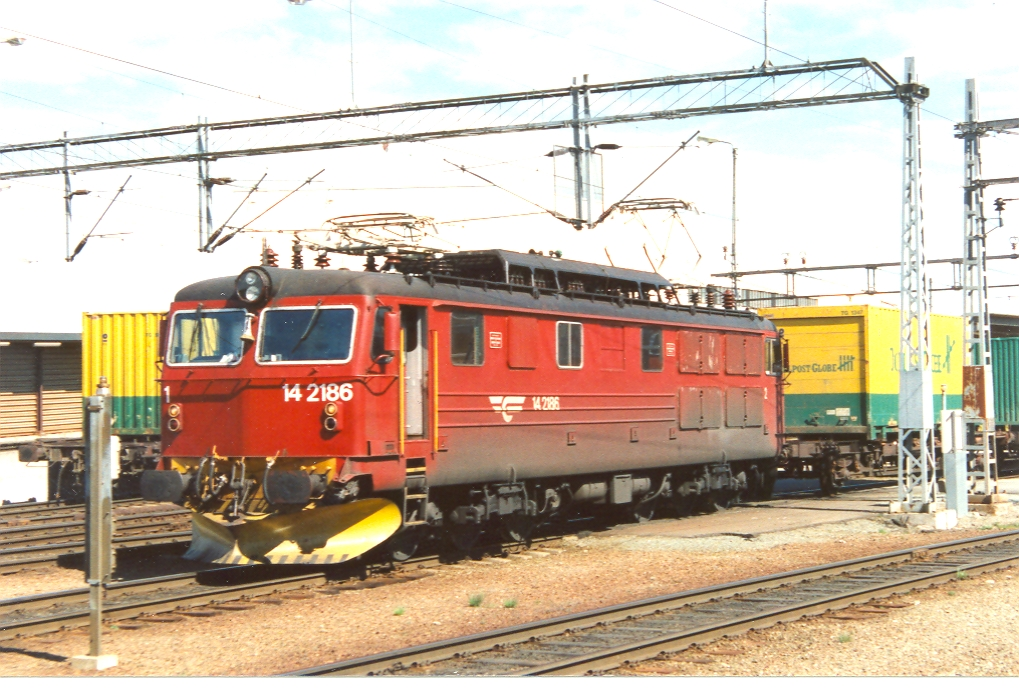
- El 14.2186 at Trondheim Central Station in 1997
Type and origin
- Power type: Electric
- Builder: Thunes Mekaniske Værksted A/S
- Build date: 1968–1973
Specifications
- Configuration
  - UIC: Co′Co′
- Gauge: 1,435 mm (4 ft 8 1/2 in) standard gauge
- Length: 17.7 m (58 ft 1 in)
- Loco weight: 105 t (103 long tons; 116 short tons)
- Electric system/s: 15 kV 16 2/3 Hz AC Catenary
- Current pickup: Pantograph
- Traction motors: 6× NEBB ELM982St
Performance figures
- Maximum speed: 120 km/h (75 mph); 100 km/h (62 mph) (1997- )
- Power output: 5,082 kW (6,815 hp)
Career
- Operators: CargoNet
- Numbers: 14 2164 – 14 2190; 14 2197 – 14 2200

NSB El 14 is a Norwegian electric locomotive operated by CargoNet for freight trains hauling. Built between 1968 and 1973 by Thune as a general purpose engine for the Norwegian State Railways (NSB), they were seen hauling passenger trains until the 1980s. Of the 31 units numbered 14 2164 to 14 2190 and 14 2197 to 14 2200, 11 remain in service.

== History ==
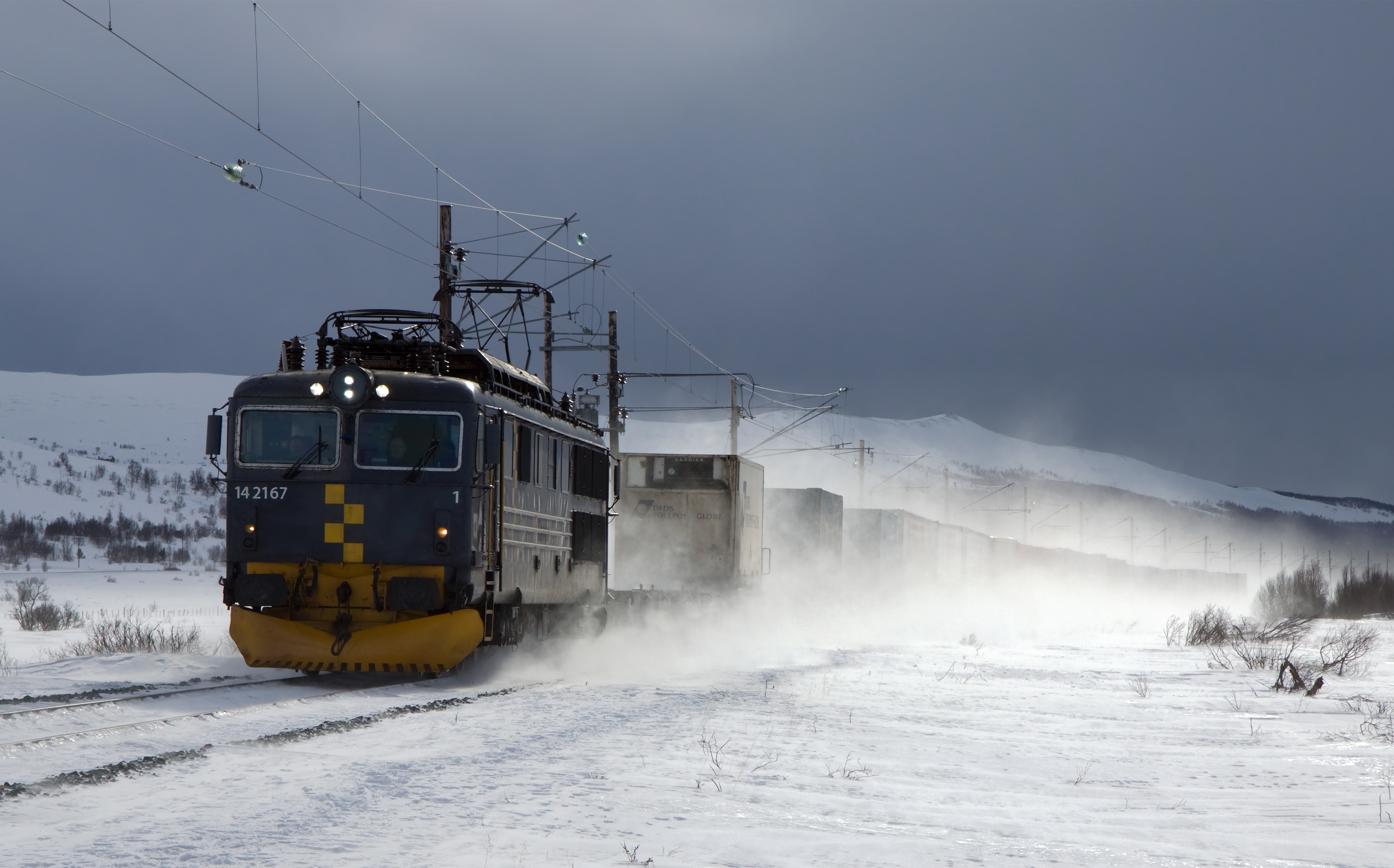
CargoNet El 14.2167 hauling a freight train on the Dovre Line

The electrification of the Dovre Line in the late 1960s forced NSB to buy a more powerful universal locomotive than the El 13. Based on the Swiss Ae 6/6 and NSB El 13, both developed in the 1950s, the El 14 introduced three-axle bogies in Norway while the power was increased to 5,097 kW (6,835 hp) and the weight reduced to 105 tonnes (103 long tons; 116 short tons); remaining more powerful than its successors El 16 and El 17.

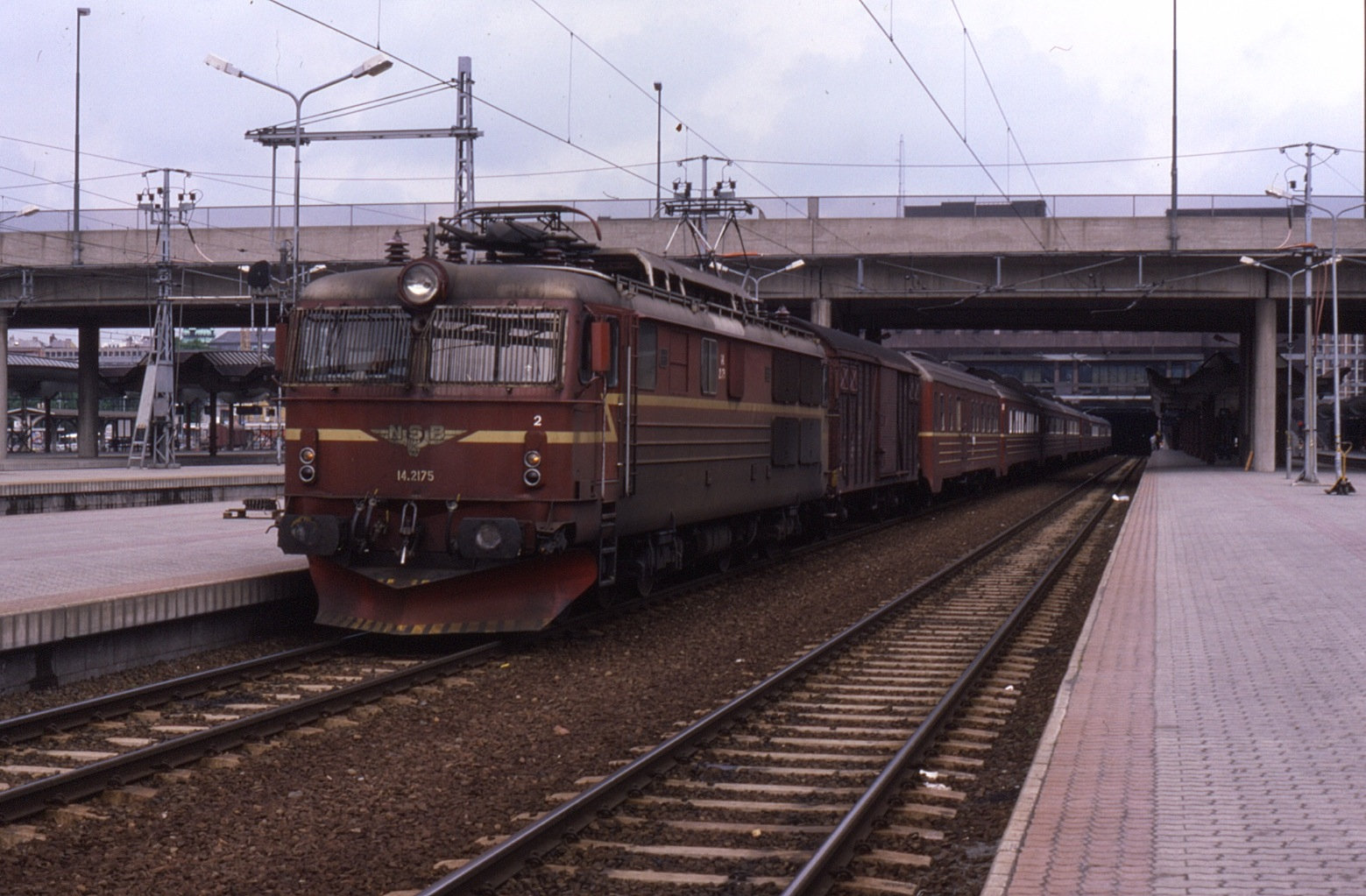
NSB El 14.2175 at Oslo Central Station in 1986

With the delivery of more powerful El 18 in 1996-97, the El 14s were transferred to freight service alone, with the maximum speed reduced from 120 to 100 km/h (75 to 62 mph). The only scrapping occurred in December 2005 when one hit a large pile of rocks from a landslide near Evanger, Hordaland.
