= Ringebu Station =

Railway station in Ringebu, Norway

Ringebu
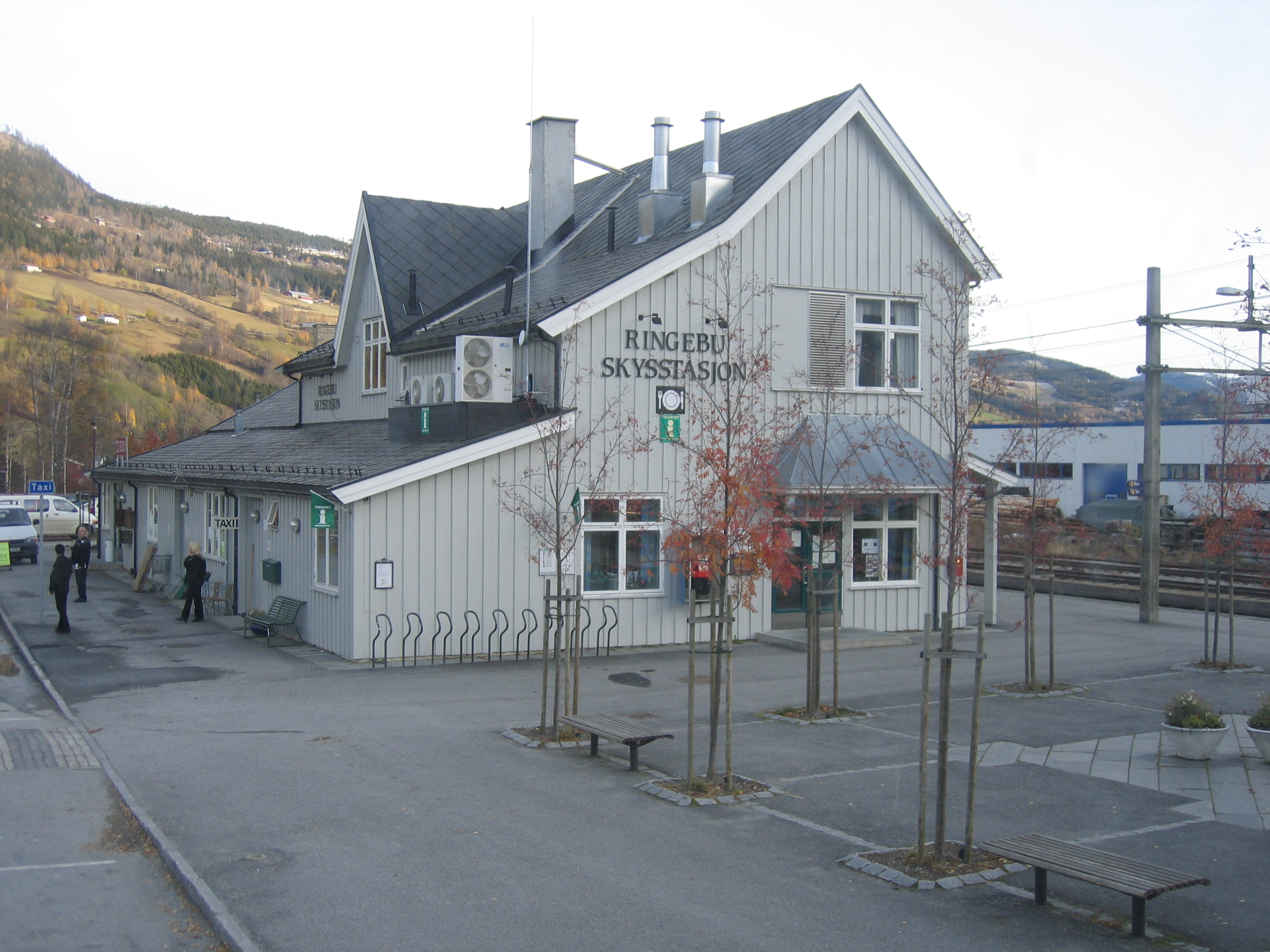

General information
- Location: Ringebu, Ringebu Municipality; Norway
- Coordinates: 61°31′45″N 10°8′20″E
- Elevation: 197 m (646 ft) amsl
- Owner: Bane NOR
- Operator: SJ Norge, Vy
- Line: Dovre Line
- Distance: 242.55 km (150.71 mi)
- Platforms: 1

History
- Opened: 1896
Location

Ringebu Station (Norwegian: Ringebu stasjon) is a railway station located at the village of Ringebu in Ringebu Municipality in Innlandet county, Norway. The station is located on the Dovre Line and serves express trains to Oslo and Trondheim. The station was opened in 1896 when the Dovre Line was extended from Tretten to Otta.

The station restaurant was taken over by Norsk Spisevognselskap on 1 January 1926. It was transferred back to private operation from 1932, but then again operated by Spisevognselskapet from 15 March 1942.

Preceding station	Express trains	Following station
Hunderfossen towards Oslo S	F6	Vinstra towards Trondheim S
