= Hunderfossen Station =

Railway station in Lillehammer, Norway

Hunderfossen
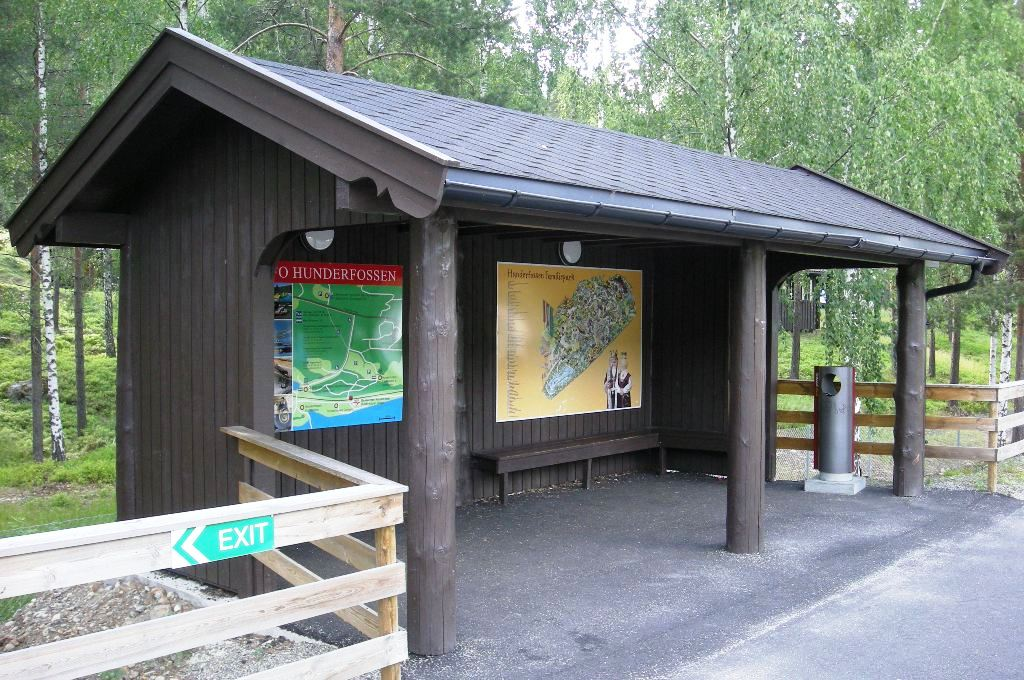

General information
- Location: Hunderfossen, Lillehammer Municipality; Norway
- Coordinates: 61°13′23″N 10°26′16″E
- Owner: Bane NOR
- Operator: SJ Norge, Vy
- Line: Dovre Line
- Distance: 198.26 km (123.19 mi)
- Platforms: 1

History
- Opened: 1986
Location

Hunderfossen Station is a railway station located at the village of Hunderfossen in Lillehammer Municipality, Norway. The station is located on the Dovre Line and served express trains to Oslo and Trondheim. The station was opened in 1986 and serves the areas of Øyer Municipality, the Hafjell skiing resort and Hunderfossen Family Park. During the 1994 Winter Olympics it served Hafjell and the Lillehammer Olympic Bobsleigh and Luge Track.

Preceding station	Express trains	Following station
Lillehammer towards Oslo S	F6	Ringebu towards Trondheim S
