= Hunderfossen =

Village in Lillehammer Municipality, Norway

- Village
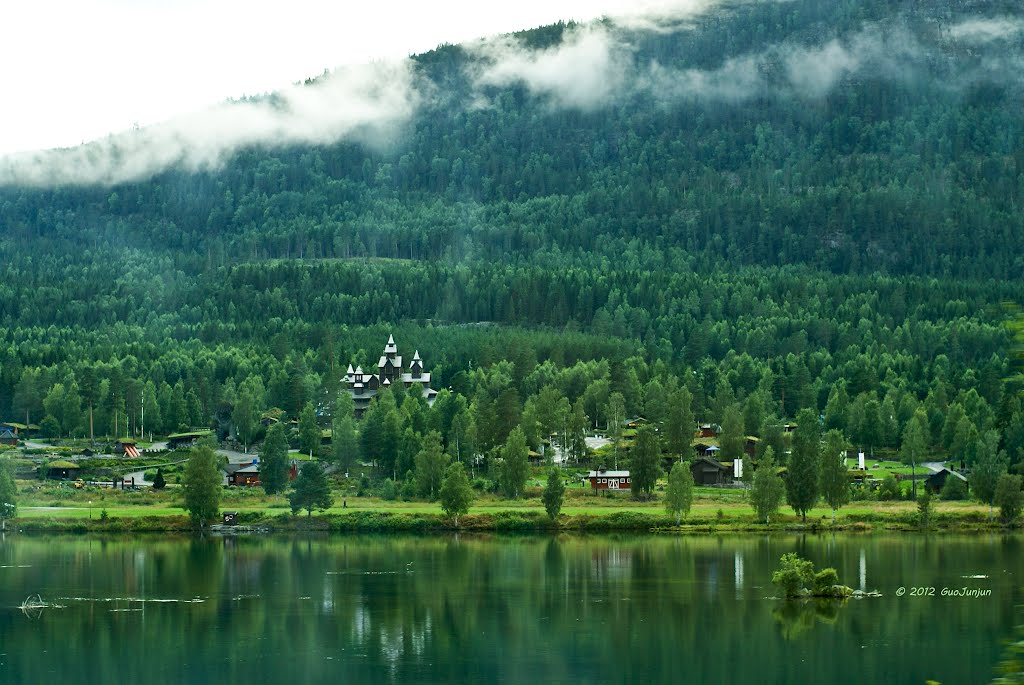
- View of the village
- Interactive map of Hunderfossen
- Location within Innlandet Location within Norway
- Coordinates: 61.22731°N 10.43534°E
- Country: Norway
- Region: Eastern Norway
- County: Innlandet
- District: Gudbrandsdalen
- Municipality: Lillehammer Municipality
- Elevation: 190 m (620 ft)
- Time zone: UTC+01:00 (CET)
  - Summer (DST): UTC+02:00 (CEST)
- Post Code: 2625 Fåberg

Hunderfossen is a small village area in Lillehammer Municipality in Innlandet county, Norway. The village is located along the northern edge of the municipality, along the west shore of the Gudbrandsdalslågen river. It lies about 15 kilometers (9.3 mi) north of the town of Lillehammer and about 5 kilometres (3.1 mi) north of the village of Fåberg.

The small village features the Hunderfossen Familiepark, the Lillehammer Olympic Bobsleigh and Luge Track, and the Hunderfossen Station on the Dovrebanen railway line.

== Name ==
The village area is named after the nearby Hunderfoss waterfall on the nearby Gudbrandsdalslågen river.
