= Dovre Station =

Railway station in Dovre, Norway

Dovre
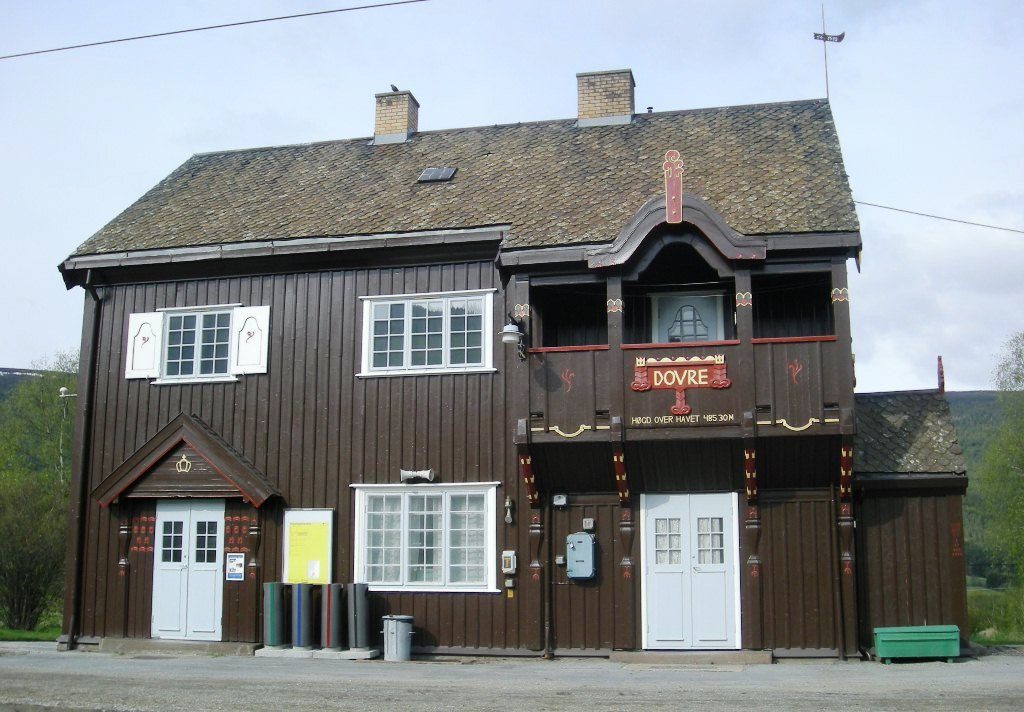

General information
- Location: Dovre, Dovre Municipality; Norway
- Coordinates: 61°59′7″N 9°15′24″E
- Elevation: 485 m (1,591 ft) AMSL
- Owner: Bane NOR
- Operator: SJ Norge, Vy
- Line: Dovre Line
- Distance: 330.82 km (205.56 mi)
- Platforms: 2

History
- Opened: 1913
Location

Dovre Station is a railway station located at the village of Dovre in Dovre Municipality, Norway. The station is located on the Dovre Line and served by one daily express trains in each direction to Oslo and Trondheim since 11 June 2006. The station was opened in 1913 when the Dovre Line was extended from Otta to Dombås.

Preceding station	Express trains	Following station
Otta towards Oslo S	F6	Dombås towards Trondheim S
