= Randklev Bridge =

Randklev Bridge Randklev bru
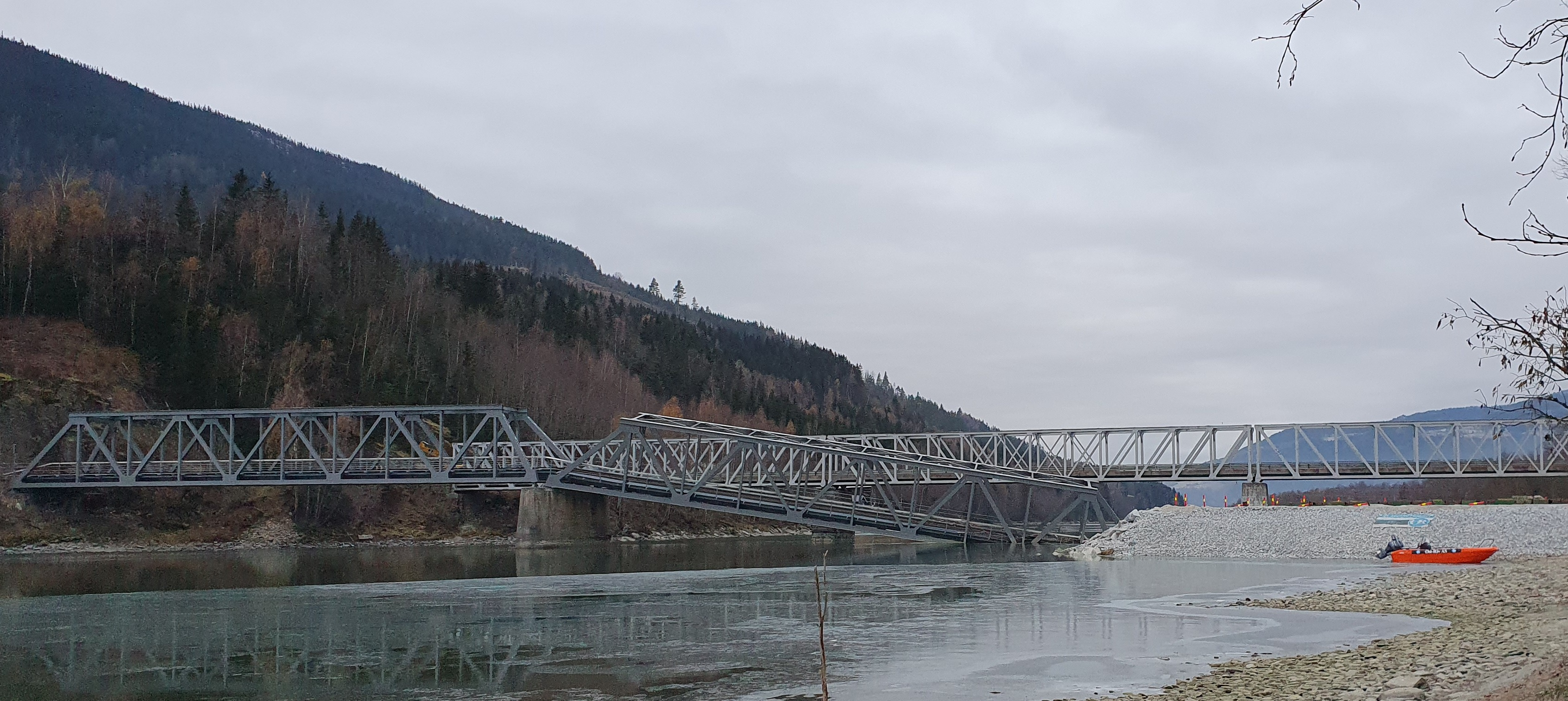
- The collapsed bridge
- Coordinates: 61°31′08″N 10°08′33″E
- Carries: Dovrebanen railway
- Crosses: Gudbrandsdalslågen
- Locale: Ringebu Municipality, Norway

Characteristics
- Design: Truss bridge
- Material: Steel
- Total length: 172 metres (564 ft)
- Width: Single track

History
- Opened: 1957

Randklev Bridge is a railway bridge on the Dovre Line over Gudbrandsdalslågen in Ringebu Municipality in Innlandet county, Norway.

== Construction ==
The railway bridge was opened in 1957. It replaced a bridge next to it built 1896, considered too weak for increasing train weights and too low for electrification, which after 1957 is a narrow road bridge, still remaining as it was then. It is one of four railway bridges over this river.

== Collapse in 2023 ==
In August 2023 the Randklev railway bridge collapsed during a flood, because a pillar in the river lost its foundation.

After this repairs started. The pillars in the river have been replaced with new pillars. The truss was lifted to a place by the river by a Liebherr LR 11350 crane, capable of 1350 tonnes. The bridge accepted railway traffic again in May 2024.

The bridges carries the main line and only electrified railway between Oslo and Trondheim. When closed, some freight trains and some passenger trains used the Røros Line, while most passengers were transported by bus past the bridge, and some freight carried by truck.

The repaired bridge was reopened for traffic on 20 May 2024.

== See also ==
- List of bridges in Norway
- List of bridges in Norway by length
