= NSB El 16 =

Class of Norwegian electric locomotives

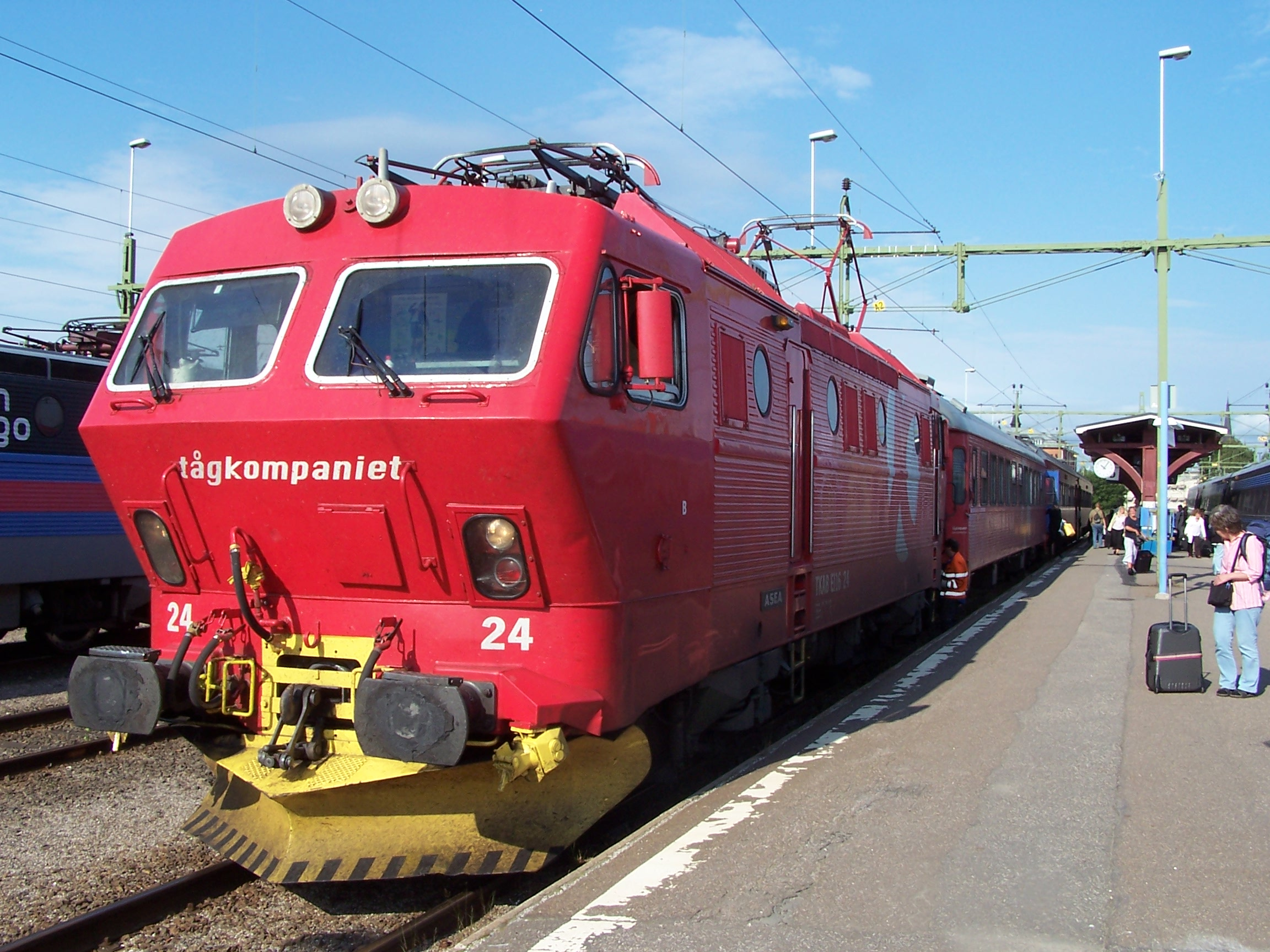
- Tågkompaniet train type El16 24, Sundsvall, Sweden (Image taken by Henrik Sendelbach).
Type and origin
- Power type: Electric
- Builder: ASEA
- Build date: 1977–1984
Specifications
- Configuration
  - UIC: Bo'Bo'
- Length: 15.52 m (50 ft 11 in)
- Loco weight: 80 t (79 long tons; 88 short tons)
- Electric system/s: 15 kV 16.7 Hz Catenary
- Current pickup: Pantograph
Performance figures
- Maximum speed: 140 km/h (87 mph)
- Power output: 4,440 kW (5,950 hp)
Career
- Operators: CargoNet
- Number in class: 17
- Numbers: 16 2201 – 16 2217
- First run: 1977

NSB El 16 is an electric locomotive which is used on the Norwegian railway system by CargoNet to haul freight trains. Until it was replaced by the El 18, the El 16 engines also pulled passenger trains on the Norwegian State Railways.

== History ==
In the 1970s NSB was faced with a challenge on the steep and wintry Bergen Line and the El 14 was not adequate for the task. The solution seemed to be a thyristor drive locomotive that had already been tested successfully by ASEA and Canadian Pacific Railway with possibilities to pull 50% heavier trains than equivalent diesel electric locomotives were capable of. This was partly due to a system of dynamic slip control, where speed of traction motors was controlled and adjusted to avoid slippage and loss of adhesion. The Swedish Rc4 locomotives were tested on the Northeast Corridor with success and NSB also chose to try the units on the Bergen Line. In 1976 NSB ordered six units of a modified Rc4 design, with dynamic brakes, increased traction power (from 4x900 kW on Rc4 to 4x1100 kW on El16) and a pointed nose which is able to force through the occasional snowdrifts. In 1980 another four units were delivered and the final seven in 1984. The sets were numbered 16 2201 to 16 2217.

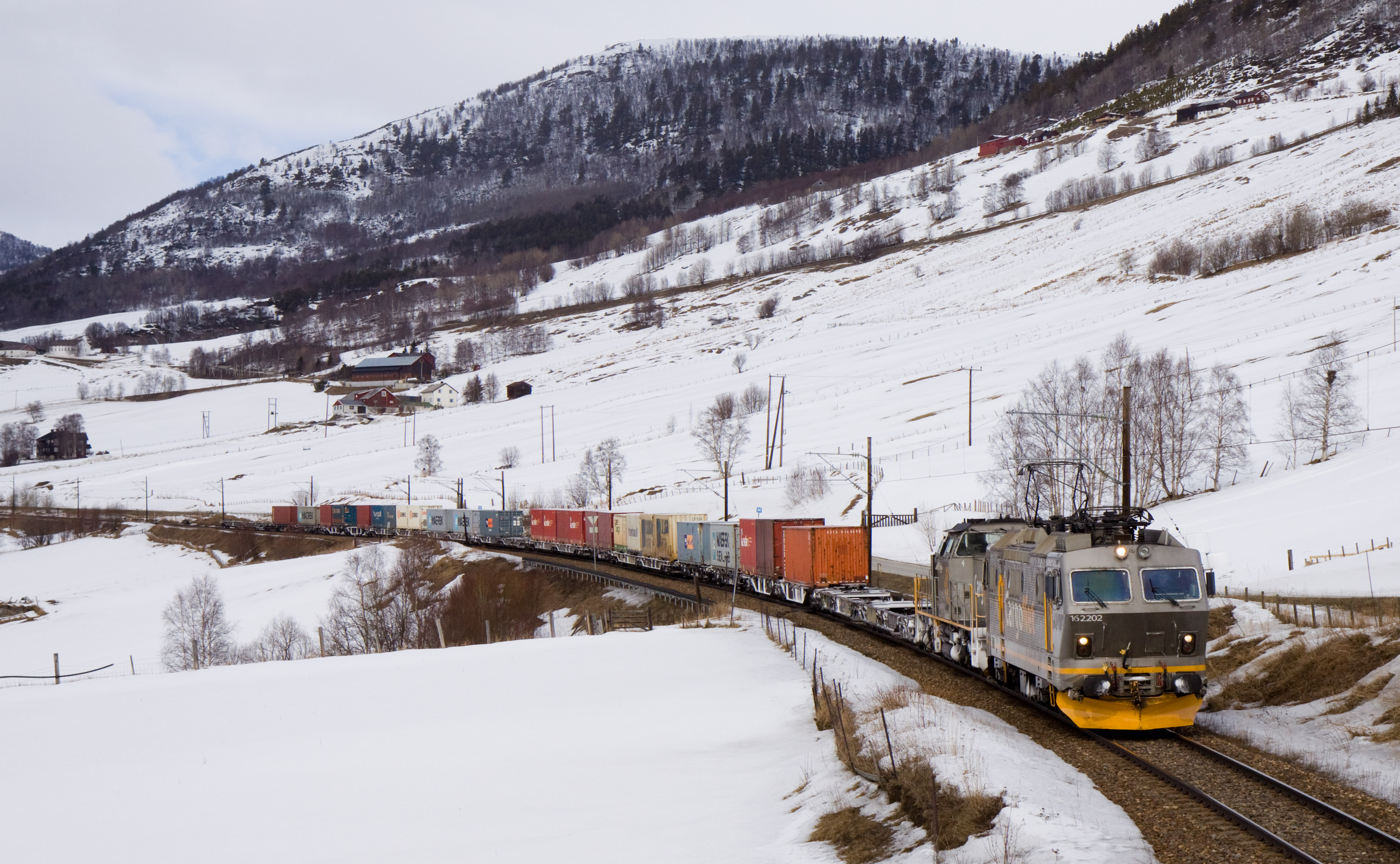
CargoNet El 16-hauled freight train near Dombås on the Dovre Line

The engines were used throughout the electrified rail network, both passenger and freight trains, with the exception of the northern section of the Gjøvik Line and the Sørland Line west of Kristiansand, due to too weak power supply systems. But the systems have since been upgraded.

Retirement from passenger service started with the fissioning of Norwegian State Railways. 8 engines were transferred to the CargoNet freight company. In 2002, a further six engines were sold to the Swedish operator Tågkompaniet and the remaining three engines were purchased by CargoNet. In 2007 all engines from Tågkompaniet were sold back to Norway. Two 16 engines were lost when they caught fire during cargo services across the Swedish border.
