= Vinstra Station =

Railway station in Nord-Fron, Norway

Vinstra
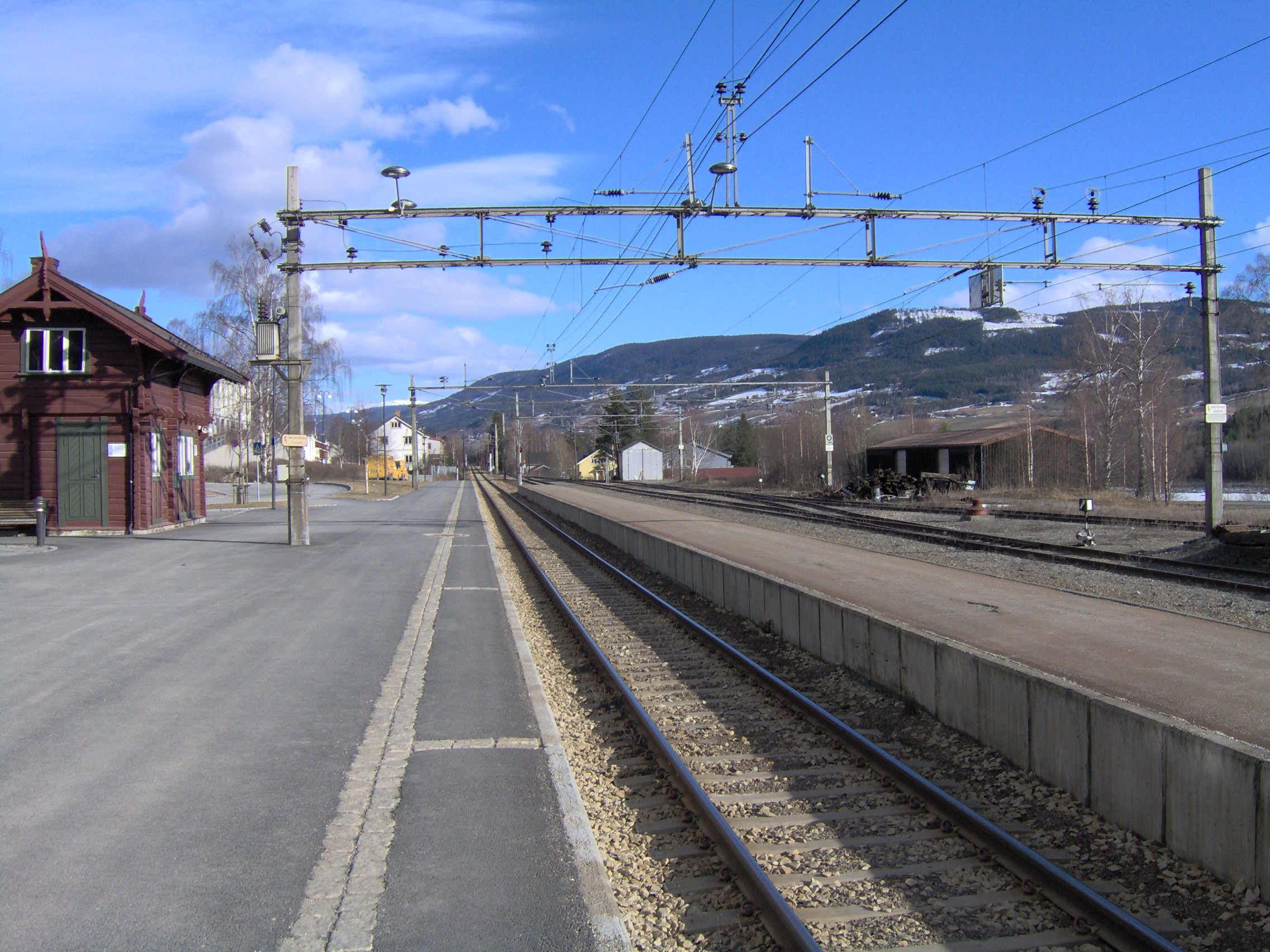

General information
- Location: Vinstra, Nord-Fron Municipality; Norway
- Coordinates: 61°35′43″N 9°44′50″E
- Elevation: 241 m (791 ft) AMSL
- Owner: Bane NOR
- Operator: SJ Norge, Vy
- Line: Dovre Line
- Distance: 266.6 km (165.7 mi)
- Platforms: 2

History
- Opened: 1896
Location

Vinstra Station is a railway station located at the village of Vinstra in Nord-Fron Municipality, Norway. The station is located on the Dovre Line and served express trains to Oslo and Trondheim. The station was opened in 1896 when the Dovre Line was extended from Tretten to Otta.

Preceding station	Express trains	Following station
Ringebu towards Oslo S	F6	Otta towards Trondheim S
