= NSB El 18 =

Norwegian electric locomotive class

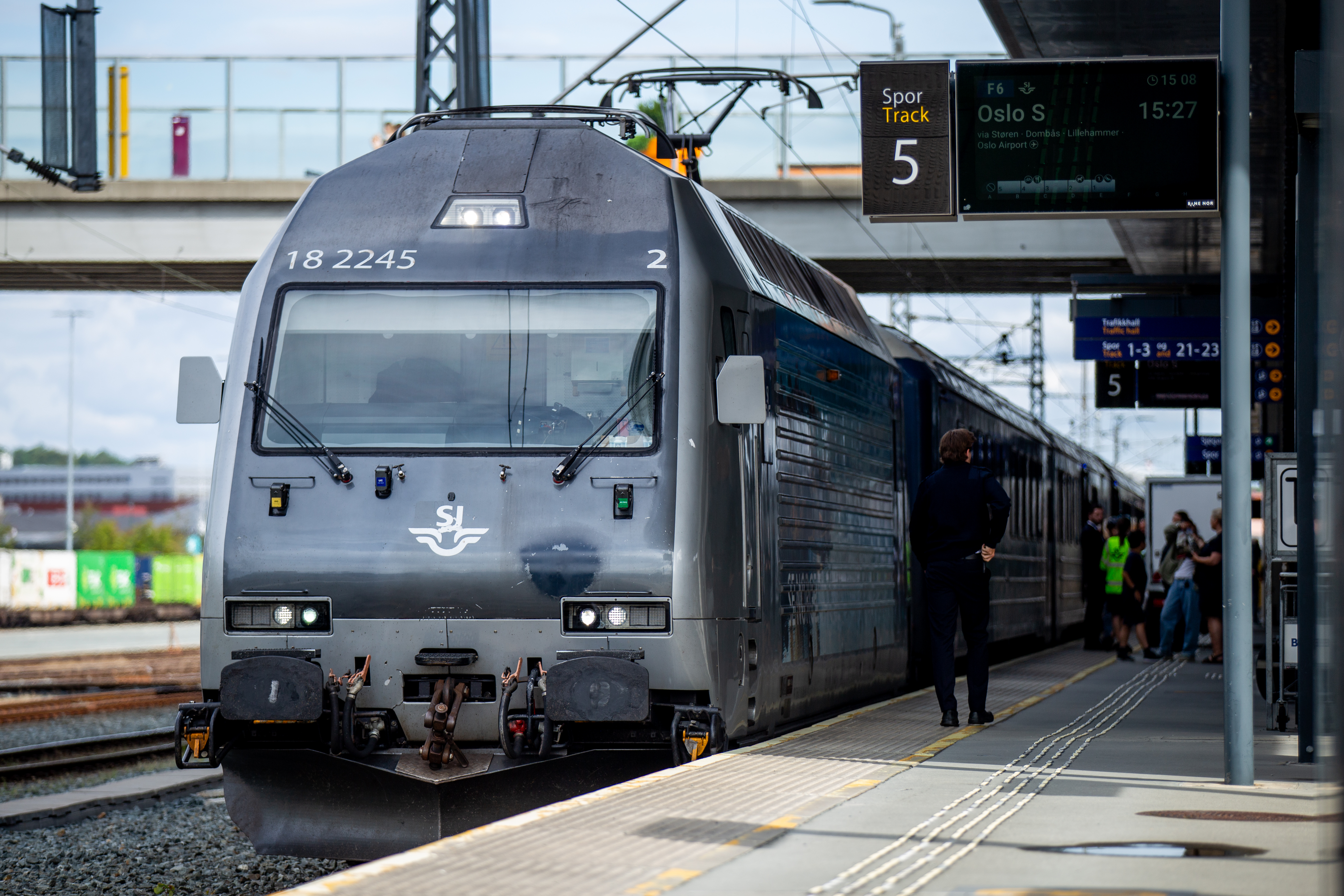
- El 18 at Trondheim station
Type and origin
- Power type: Electric
- Builder: Adtranz
- Build date: 1996–1997
Specifications
- Configuration
  - AAR: B-B
  - UIC: Bo'Bo'
- Gauge: 1,435 mm (4 ft 8 1/2 in) standard gauge
- Length: 18.5 m (60 ft 8 in)
- Loco weight: 83 t (82 long tons; 91 short tons)
- Electric system/s: 15 kV 16.7 Hz AC Catenary
- Current pickup(s): Pantograph
Performance figures
- Maximum speed: 200 km/h (124 mph)
- Power output: 5,400 kW (7,240 hp)
- Tractive effort: 275 kN (62,000 lb_{f})
Career
- Operators: Vy, Go-Ahead Norge SJ-Norge
- Number in class: 22
- Disposition: In service

NSB El 18 is a class of 22 electric locomotives built by Adtranz and Swiss Locomotive & Machine Works (SLM) for the Norwegian State Railways (NSB). The class is a modification of the Swiss Federal Railways Re 460 locomotive and built at Adtranz Strømmen in 1996 and 1997. The class remains the only mainline electric locomotive used by NSB, and is predominantly used on some intercity services and all night trains on the Bergen Line, Dovre Line and Sørland Line, as well as some regional trains.

The locomotives are 18.5 metres (61 ft) long and weigh 83 tonnes (82 long tons; 91 short tons). They have three-phase asynchronous motors with a maximum power output of 5,880 kilowatts (7,890 hp), giving a tractive effort of 275 kilonewtons (62,000 lb_{f}) and a maximum speed of 200 km/h (120 mph). They have a Bo'Bo' wheel arrangement and regenerative brakes. The exterior was designed by Pininfarina and the cabs have pressurization. The units are numbered 2241 through 2262.

== History ==
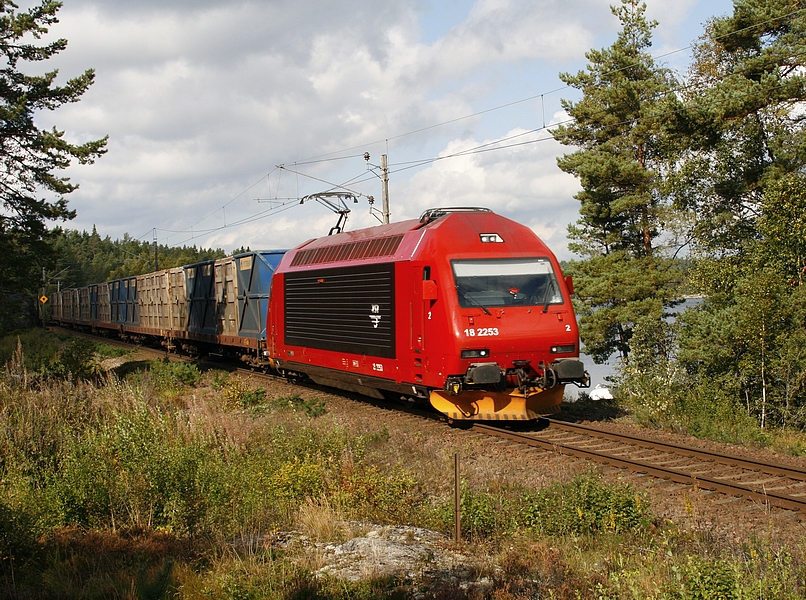
El 18 hauling a freight train on the Østfold Line for CargoNet

During the early 1990s, NSB was in need of new electric haulage for their passenger trains, as both classes El 11 and El 13 were in need of replacement. El 17, the latest purchase, had proved unreliable, and NSB wanted to remove them from mainline service. In 1993, Re 460 and EuroSprinter locomotives were tested in Norway, with the Re 460 being tested from 28 August through 8 October. NSB was satisfied with both units, and stated that it would be possible to increase the train weight on the intercity services from 700 to 800 t (690 to 790 long tons; 770 to 880 short tons). During the first half of 1994, NSB leased two Re 460s to have sufficient locomotives for operation during the 1994 Winter Olympics.

When the deadline for bids for the units was reached on 8 May 1994, five bids had been received. GEC Alsthom offered a modification of the French SNCF Class BB 36000 and AEG offered a variation of the German prototype 12X. Siemens offered two models, the EuroSprinter and an adaptation of the Austrian ÖBB Class 1014. Siemens' proposal for the former was branded Dovresprinter and was a cooperation between Kværner and NSB's workshop at Sundland in Drammen. Siemens would deliver the overall design and electrical components, Kværner would build the mechanical components and the assembly would occur in Drammen. The final offer was from Asea Brown Boveri (ABB), and Swiss Locomotive & Machine Works (which by delivery would be sold to become Adtranz) for "Lok 2000", a modification of the Swiss Re 460.

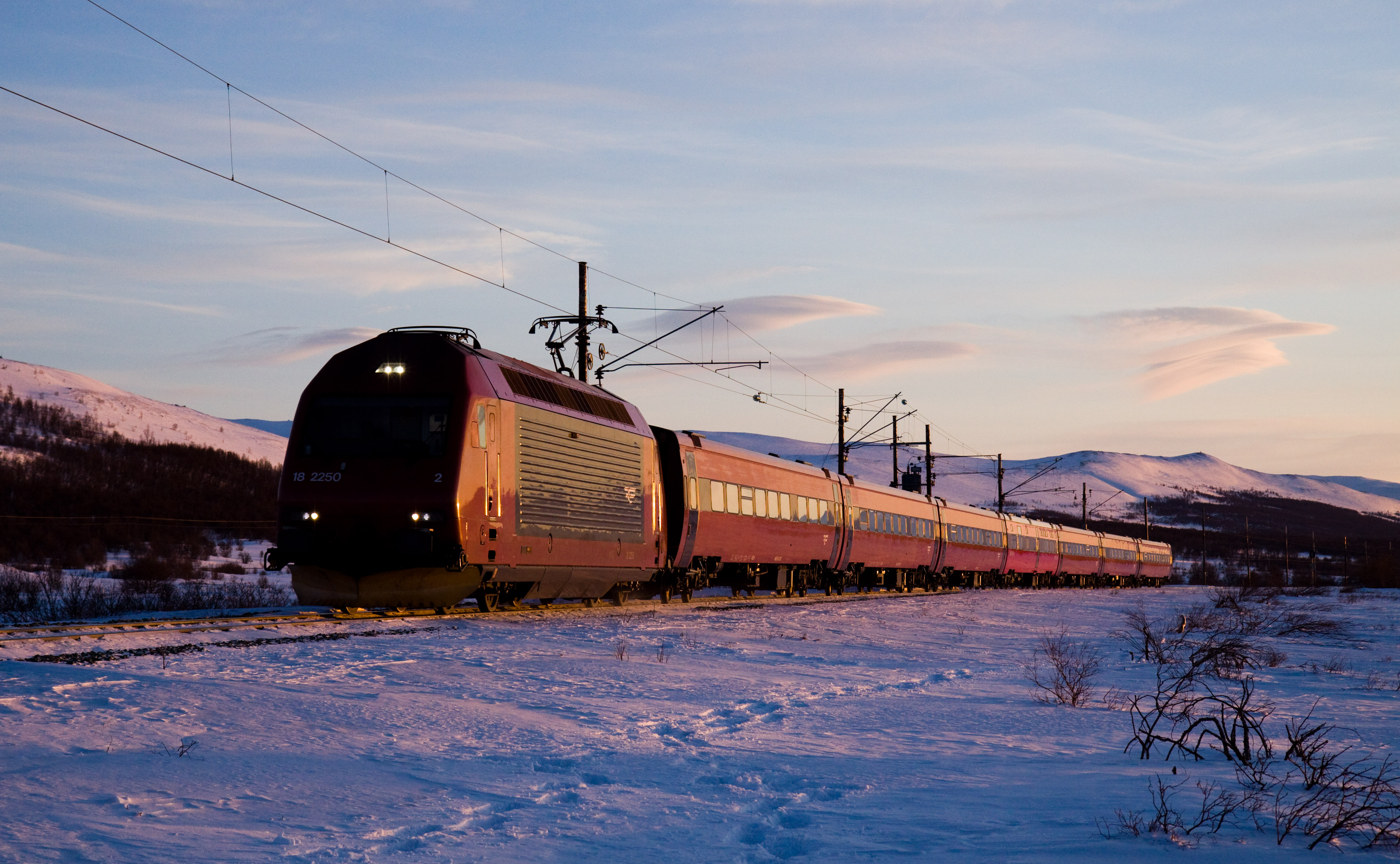
El 18-hauled B7 train near Dombås on the Dovre Line

Prior to the final negotiations, union representatives for the train drivers stated that Lok 2000 was their preference, and that NSB could expect a dispute if they chose a different model. The representatives stated that they were "tired of experimenting with Norwegian solutions". Another important aspect for NSB was that as much of the production as possible take place in Norway. The final negotiations were made with ABB/SLM and AEG and on 2 September, and NSB approved the agreement with ABB/SLM for a purchase of 22 units. The contract was signed on 27 September, and the 22 units cost approximately 700 million Norwegian krone.

NSB considered ordering the units with support for both the Norwegian and Swedish 15 kV 16 2/3 Hz AC system, and the Danish 25 kV 50 Hz AC system. This would have allowed the trains to operate directly to Denmark via the Øresund Bridge, which was then under construction. The dual-voltage system was dropped during the procurement process, but NSB stated that if they needed such units, compatibility could be provided in future orders of the class. The units were built by Adtranz Strømmen at Strømmen outside Oslo, and delivered between 3 September 1996 and 12 June 1997. The units are numbered 2241 through 2262. When entering service, the locomotives replaced NSB's oldest units, El 13, which were then retired. This reduced NSB's average locomotive age from 31 to 18 1/2 years at the time of the end of the delivery.

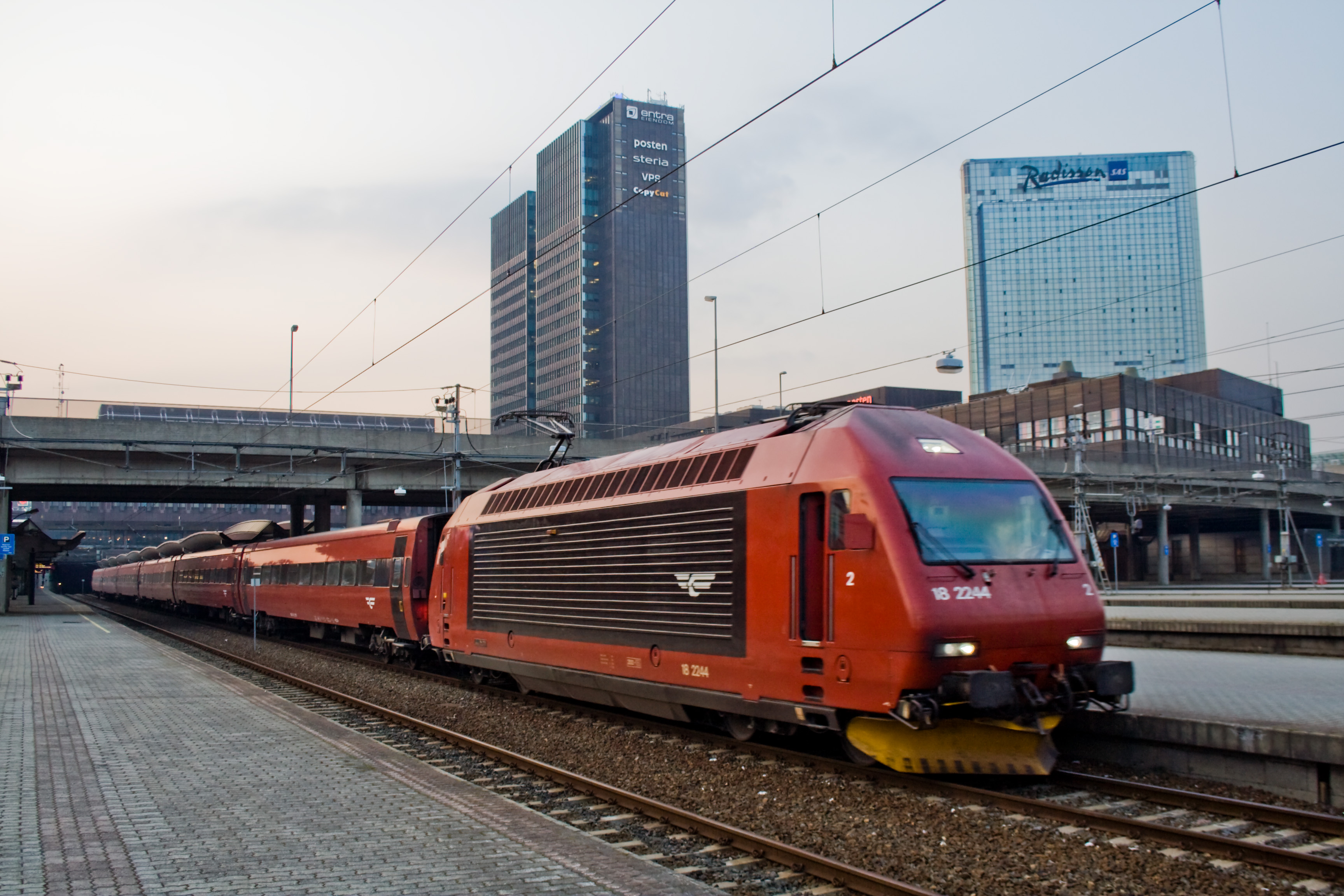
El 18-hauled B7 train at Oslo Central Station

During 1997, there were five incidents where NSB's Nordic Mobile Telephone equipment interfered with the locomotive's electronics, causing the emergency brakes to activate. This caused a temporary halt until the motorman had unlocked the brakes. The problem was fixed by moving NSB's mobile transmitters. The units were taken into use on the Bergen Line from 5 January 1997. Later they entered into use on the Dovre and Sørland Lines, and then on regional trains around Oslo, such as the Vestfold Line. In August 1998, NSB stated that El 18 used more power than some of the substation transformers along the line could handle, particularly along the Vestfold Line. Part of the problem was caused by a mechanism in the locomotives whereby the motor was turned off if the wheels spin. The result was that the full power output of the El 18 along parts of the railway network could not be utilized.

Three have been operated by Go-Ahead Norge since December 2019.

== Specifications ==
The locomotives have a maximum power output of 5,880 kW (7,890 hp), and are capable of a continual power output of 5,400 kW (7,200 hp). This gives a maximum speed of 200 km/h (120 mph) and a tractive effort of 275 kN (62,000 lb_{f}). The locomotive is fed 15 kV 16.7 Hz AC power from the pantograph. This is then converted to direct current before being converted to three-phase electricity through one of three gate turn-off thyristors. Each bogie has three rectifiers, each connected to a transformer that is again connected to two inverters. The motors are three-phase asynchronous motors located in the bogie frame and equipped with regenerative brakes. There is also an auxiliary three-phase power supply which powers the compressor, pumps, ventilators and other auxiliary equipment, operated by four separate inverters. The controller is a 16-bit microprocessor that communicates using optical fibre cables. The rectifier, auxiliary rectifiers, controllers and the error and diagnostic system is of the same type as used on the NSB Class 70 multiple units.

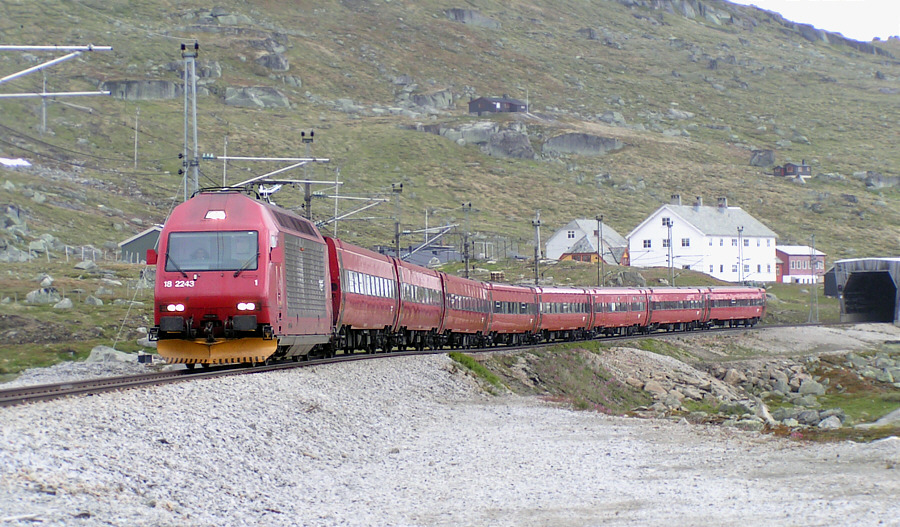
El 18-hauled B7 train near Finse on the Bergen Line

Each unit weighs 83 t (82 long tons; 91 short tons). The body is 18,500 millimeters (60 ft 8 in) long, 3,000 mm (9 ft 10 in) wide and 4,322 mm (14 ft 2.2 in) tall. The center distance between the bogies is 11,000 mm (36 ft 1 in) and the center wheel distance in the bogies is 2,800 mm (9 ft 2 in). The wheel diameter is 1,125 mm (3 ft 8.3 in)—this is 25 mm (0.98 in) larger than the Re 460. The El 18 has a Knorr HSM mechanical braking system, but unlike the Swiss versions does not have a rail brake. The design of the locomotive was by the Italian company Pininfarina. The machine room is designed with a center aisle, the driver's cabs have pressurization applied to avoid air pressure dropping when running through tunnels, and the cabs are equipped with air conditioning.

El 18 is a modification of the Swiss Re 460. The class was originally built in 119 units from 1992 to 1995 for the Swiss State Railways, where it was given the brand Lok 2000. It was part of a project to create a series of new intercity locomotives and cars. Bern–Lötschberg–Simplon-Bahn received eight units in 1994 (as Re 465), the Finnish State Railways received 46 units between the years 1995-2003 (as Sr2) and the Kowloon–Canton Railway Corporation received 2 units in 1997. The units are designed to haul heavy passenger trains along existing curved railways at high speeds. It is designed as a universal locomotive, so it is also suitable for freight trains.
