= Otta Station =

Railway station in Norway

Otta
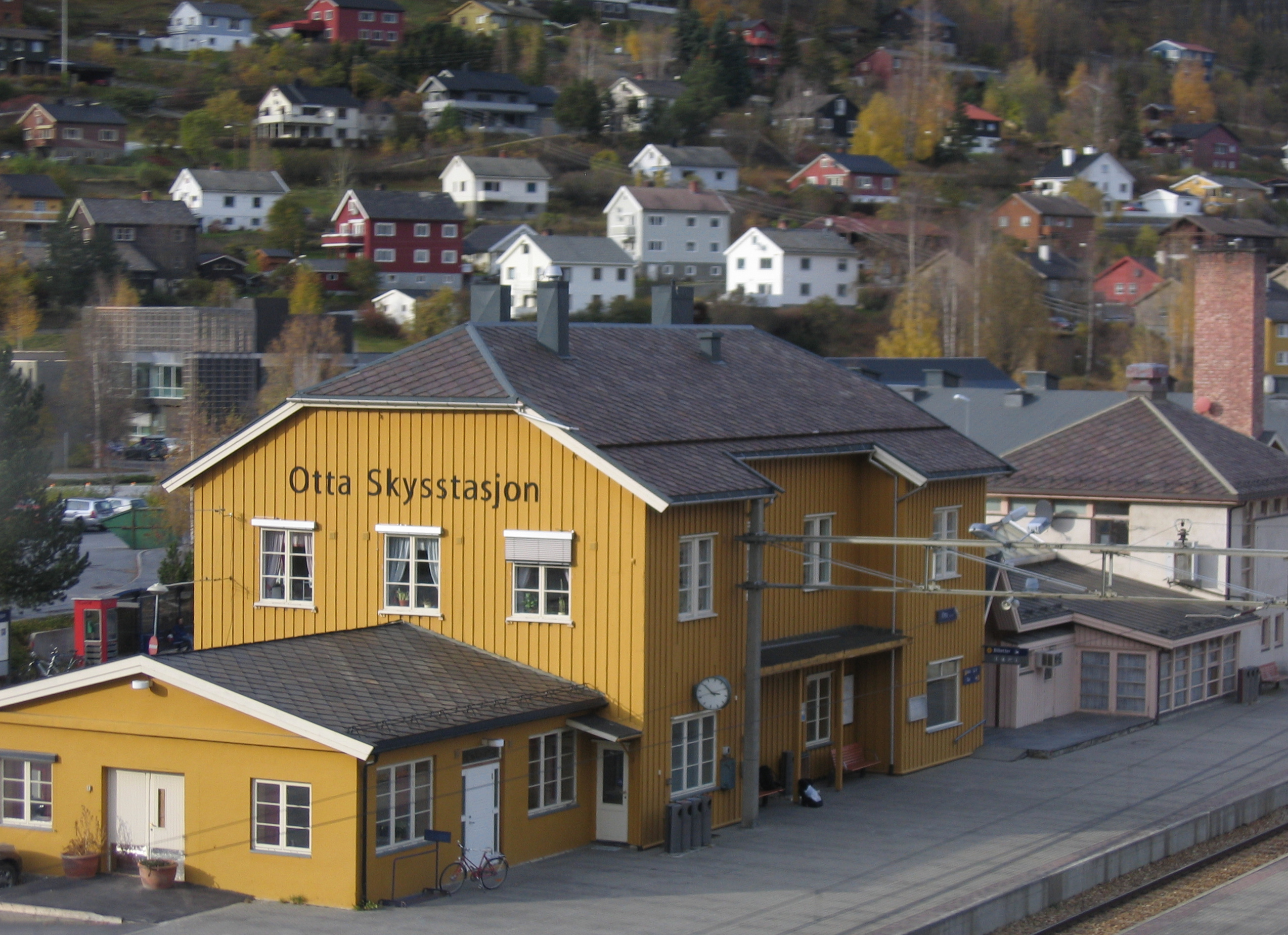

General information
- Location: Otta, Sel Municipality; Norway
- Coordinates: 61°46′20″N 9°32′12″E
- Elevation: 287 m (942 ft) amsl
- Owner: Bane NOR
- Operator: SJ Norge, Vy
- Line: Dovre Line
- Distance: 297.24 km (184.70 mi)
- Platforms: 2

Other information
- Station code: OTA

History
- Opened: 1896
Location

Otta Station (Norwegian: Otta stasjon) is a railway station located in the town of Otta in Sel Municipality, Norway. The station is located on the Dovre Line and served by express trains to Oslo and Trondheim. The station was opened in 1896 when the Dovre Line was extended from Tretten Station to Otta.

The restaurant was taken over by Norsk Spisevognselskap on 1 October 1924. It retained an all-year operation until 30 September 1928, when the restaurant was closed for the winter season. It opened again in May and retained the summer-only service. The operation was later privatized.

Preceding station	Express trains	Following station
Vinstra towards Oslo S	F6	Dovre towards Trondheim S
