= CargoNet =

Norwegian freight train operator

CargoNet AS
- Company type: Private
- Industry: Transport
- Headquarters: Oslo, Norway
- Area served: Scandinavia
- Revenue: NOK 1.247 billion (2022)
- Owner: Vy
- Number of employees: 402 (2022)
- Website: www.cargonet.no

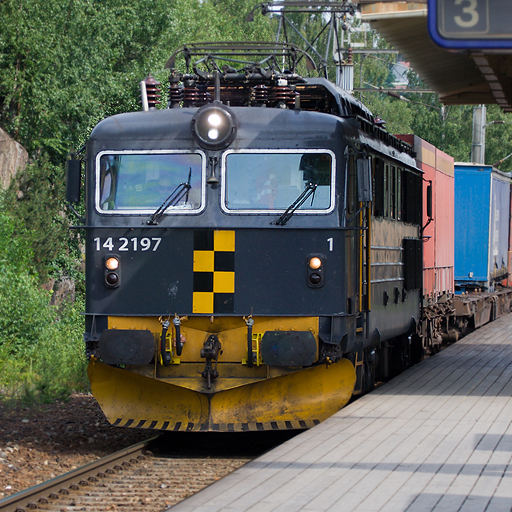
A CargoNet El 14 locomotive hauling a freight train

CargoNet AS is the primary operator of freight trains on the Norwegian railway system.

It was originally formed as NSB Gods after NSB (now Vy) was split into separate passenger and freight companies. NSB Gods changed its name to CargoNet at the beginning of 2002. It was originally owned by NSB (55% share hold) and the Swedish freight company Green Cargo who sold their share to NSB in 2010, making the latter the sole owner. CargoNet AS has a subsidiary company in Sweden called CargoNet AB which was purchased as RailCombi AB in 2002. However, CargoNet decided to exit the Swedish market in 2011 due to a lack of foreseeable profitability; it later returned during 2020.

CargoNet's operations have been highly centered upon intermodal freight movements. By 2013, twelve freight terminals were being operated by CargoNet, predominantly in Norway and Sweden; operations provide both container and bulk-cargo trains. Increasing use of real-time monitoring technologies, planning changes, new rolling stock, and other innovations have improved reliability and service levels.

== Activities ==
The CargoNet brand was adopted at the start of 2002; at the time, the organisation was jointly owned by NSB (now Vy) (which held a majority 55 percent stake) and the Swedish freight company Green Cargo (the remaining 45 percent). Its creation was one of several measures enacted to liberalise Norway's railways and to allow private companies to have greater participation; in 2003, cross-border freight traffic was opened to market competition, while Norway’s domestic freight market was similarly opened up four years later. These reforms reportedly greatly boosted demand for rail freight by 2008, leading to infrastructure owners planning substantial capacity expansion schemes for the following decade. During 2010, Green Cargo sold its 45 percent stake in CargoNet to NSB, making it a wholly owned subsidiary of the latter.

Prior to 2011, CargoNet was one of the larger rail logistics operators active in Sweden. However, in autumn 2011, the company decided to withdraw entirely from the Swedish market, stating at the time that it believed it would not be able to operate profitability in the sector; instead CargoNet reorientated towards domestic freight services within Norway. CargoNet has invested in the expansion of intermodal traffic in an effort to capture business from congested roads in the Northern parts of Norway. By 2021, fish products from Norway's northernmost port of Narvik were being shipped by rail across Europe, resulting in a 40 percent time savings. However, by the early 2020s, it was noted that capacity at several key parts of the Norwegian rail network was approaching saturation, limiting the possibilities for growth without considerable investment.

During late 2020, CargoNet decide to relaunch its Swedish operations; around the same time, Green Cargo had decided to discontinue its own cross-border trains and remove itself from the Norwegian market, allowing the company to capture these traffics relatively easily. To serve the Swedish cross-border business, CargoNet initially operating a then-weekly shuttle between Alnabru/Oslo and the port of Gothenburg, additional shuttles soon followed to serve Halmstad, Malmö, and Trelleborg. In October 2022, CargoNet's management declared their intention to increase the number of departures to Halmstad and Gothenburg as well as to further increase capacity between Oslo and Malmö/Trelleborg. Demand for these cross-border services was claimed to be growing at a faster rate than that of the domestic counterparts.

== Locomotives ==
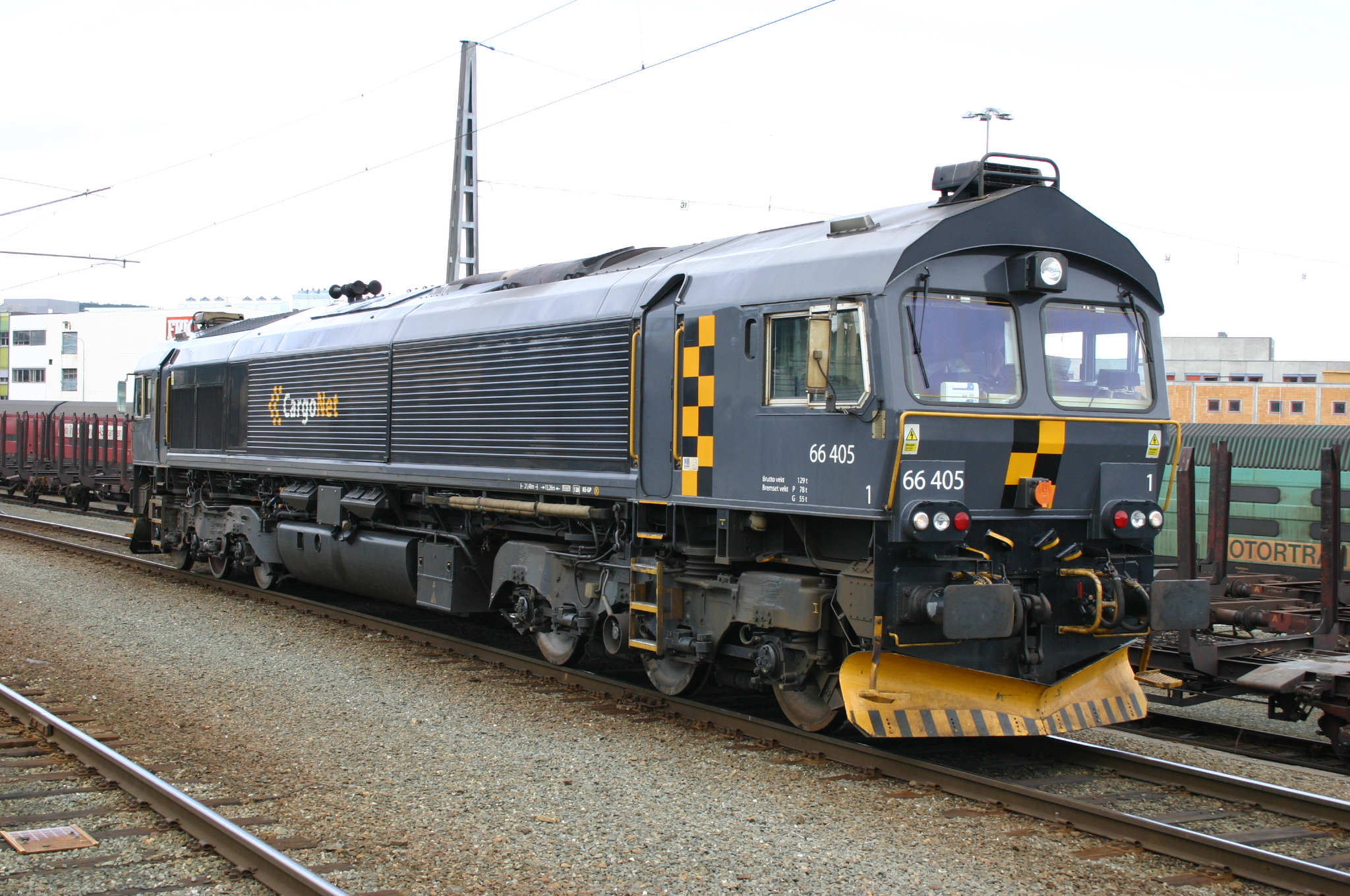
A CargoNet CD 66 diesel locomotive

Locomotives of type El 14, CD 66, and some of the El 16s have a dark gray livery with a checkered yellow and black stripe somewhere. This is partly a "refreshment" of the gray NSB-Gods livery. The Di 8 and some shunters tend to use the older yellow livery with a red driver's cab. About half of the Di 8 have a newer livery in silver with yellow stripe and yellow checkered arrow on the side. The rest of the locomotives (El 16, CE 119 and CD 312) have new livery in silver, with a yellow stripe along the side, and a checkered yellow arrow.

In September 2007, CargoNet agreed terms with one of the labor unions, which led to increased pay for drivers that use the CD 66 diesel locomotives. In September 2021, CargoNet announced that it would start bi-mode traction in the form of the Stadler Euro Dual, a dual power electro-diesel locomotive outfitted with both a diesel power units and apparatus to pick up electric power from overhead catenaries. These locomotives, which are being leased from the rolling stock company European Loc Pool, will enable CargoNet to increase the weight of its freight trains by up to 50 per cent on electrified lines due to the six-axle arrangement. as of 2023, CargoNet has 4 Stadler Eurodual locomotives in operation.

During the 2010s, CargoNet began equipping their locomotives with real-time remote monitoring apparatus, which has enabled a greater scope of interaction with train drivers, to plan usage-based maintenance based on counters, and for automated alerts of issues and abnormal behaviors to be received as fast as possible. Furthermore, customers are also able to better track services and monitor their progress through to delivery.

Locomotives
Image	Model	Number	Power	Top speed	Note
	El 14	25	Electric	100 km/h	
	El 16	15	Electric	140 km/h	
	Di 8	10	Diesel-electric	120 km/h	
	CD 66	6	Diesel-electric	120 km/h	Leased. Being replaced by CD 312, started end 2022.
	CE 119	10	Electric		Leased, of type Bombardier TRAXX
	CD 312	6	Diesel-electric	160 km/h	Leased, of type Vossloh Euro 4000
	Skd226	12	Diesel		Shunter
	Skd224	5	Diesel		Shunter
	Skd220c	3	Diesel		Shunter
	Skd225	1	Diesel		Shunter
