= Hunderfossen Familiepark =

Amusement park in Innlandet, Norway

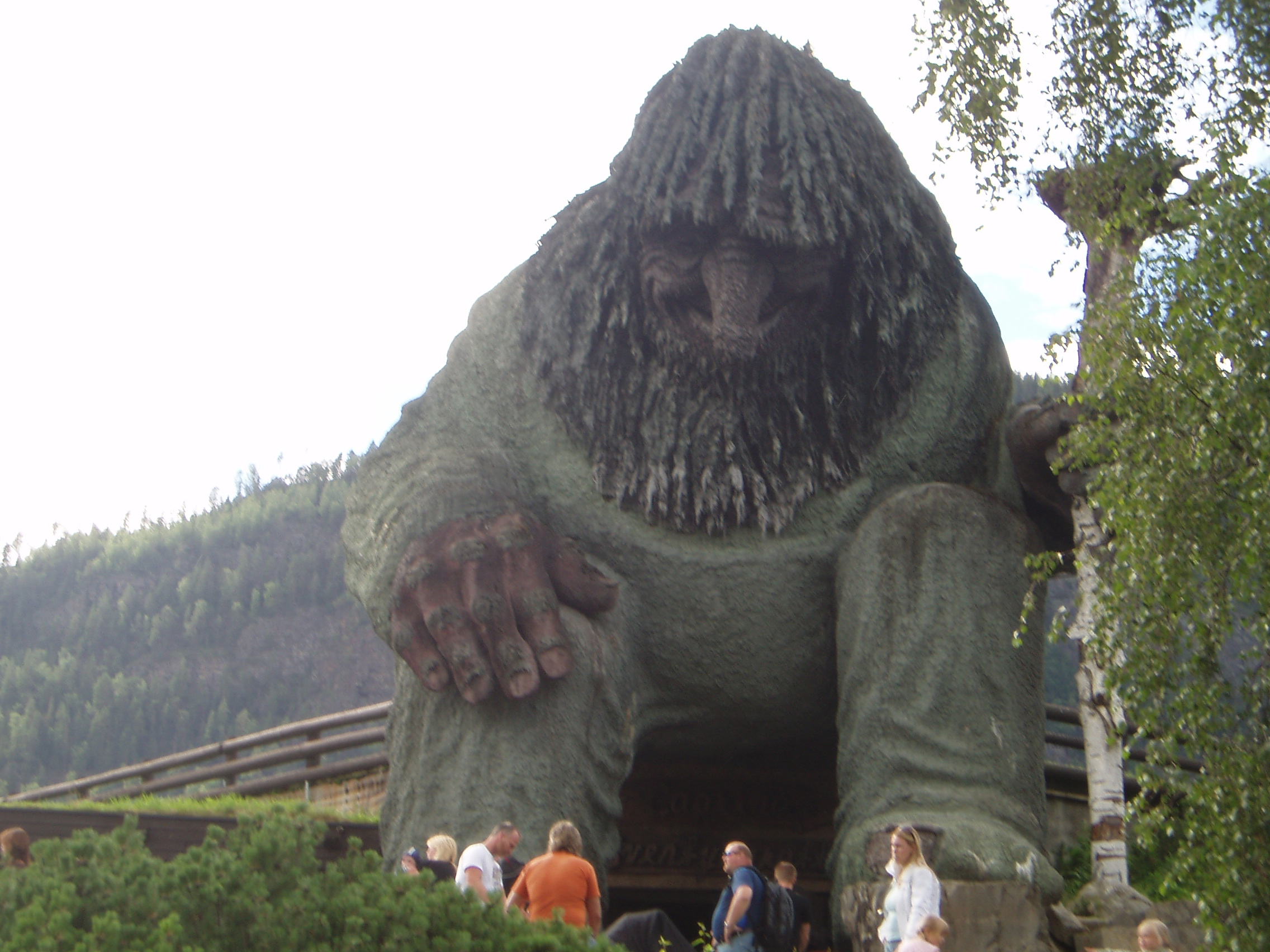
- The giant troll at Hunderfossen, Lillehammer
- Interactive map of Hunderfossen Familiepark
- Location: Lillehammer, Norway
- Coordinates: 61°13′27.26″N 10°25′41.73″E
- Opened: 1984

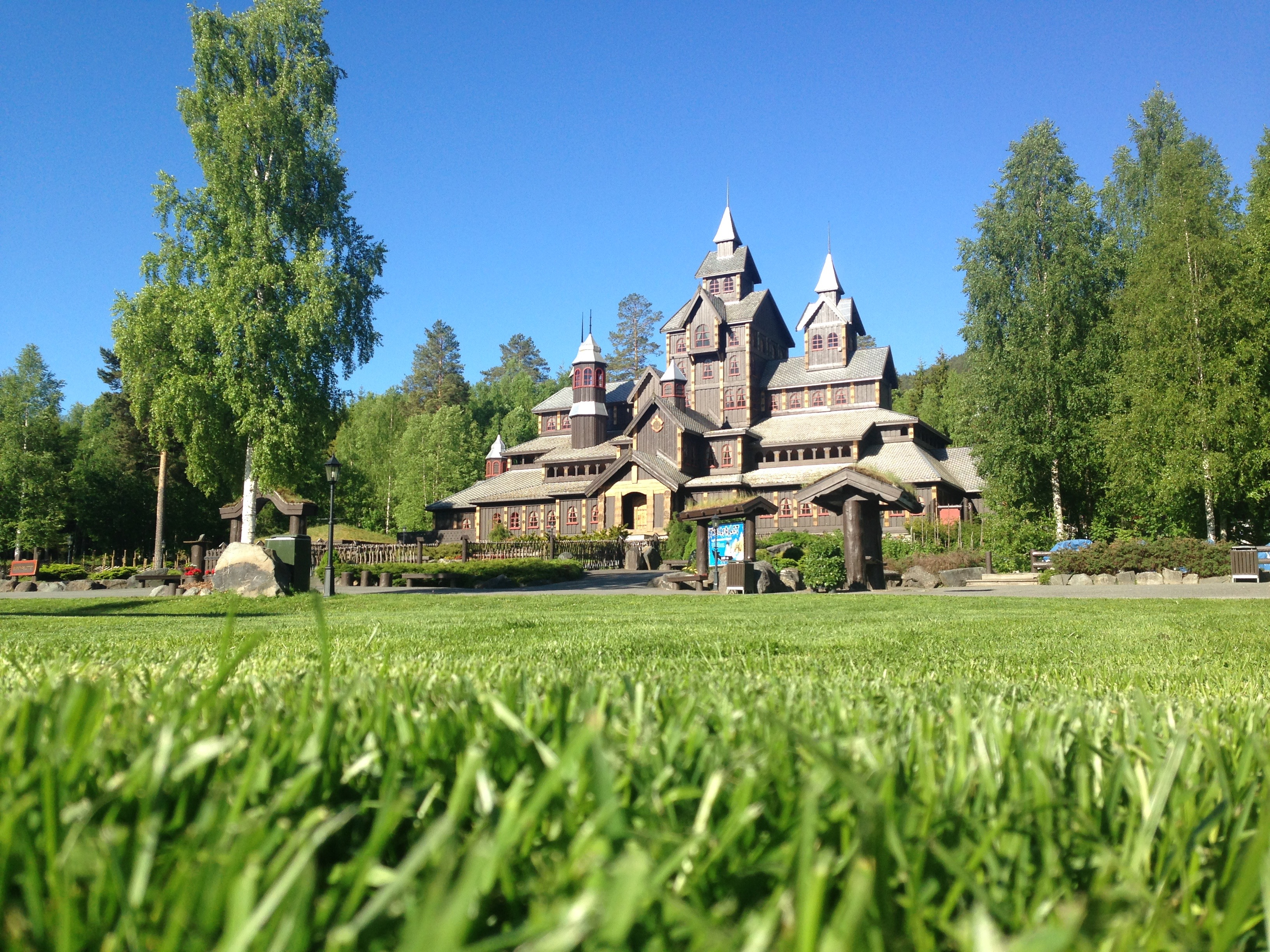
Eventyrslottet (The Fairy Tale castle) in Hunderfossen

Hunderfossen Familiepark is an amusement park north of Lillehammer in the province of Innlandet in Norway.

The park is one of Norway's biggest tourist attractions, with over 275,000 visitors each summer. It also has a Winter Park which opens from February to mid-March. The park was founded in 1984, and currently has more than 60 attractions.

Many of the rides and attractions are themed after or inspired by Norwegian folktales by Peter Christen Asbjørnsen and Jørgen Moe.

The park was featured in an episode of the Netflix original series Lilyhammer (Season 1, Episode 8: "Trolls"). In the movie Troll the Norwegian army tries to destroy the troll which ravages Norway above the Park without success.
