= Dovre Line =

Railway line in Norway

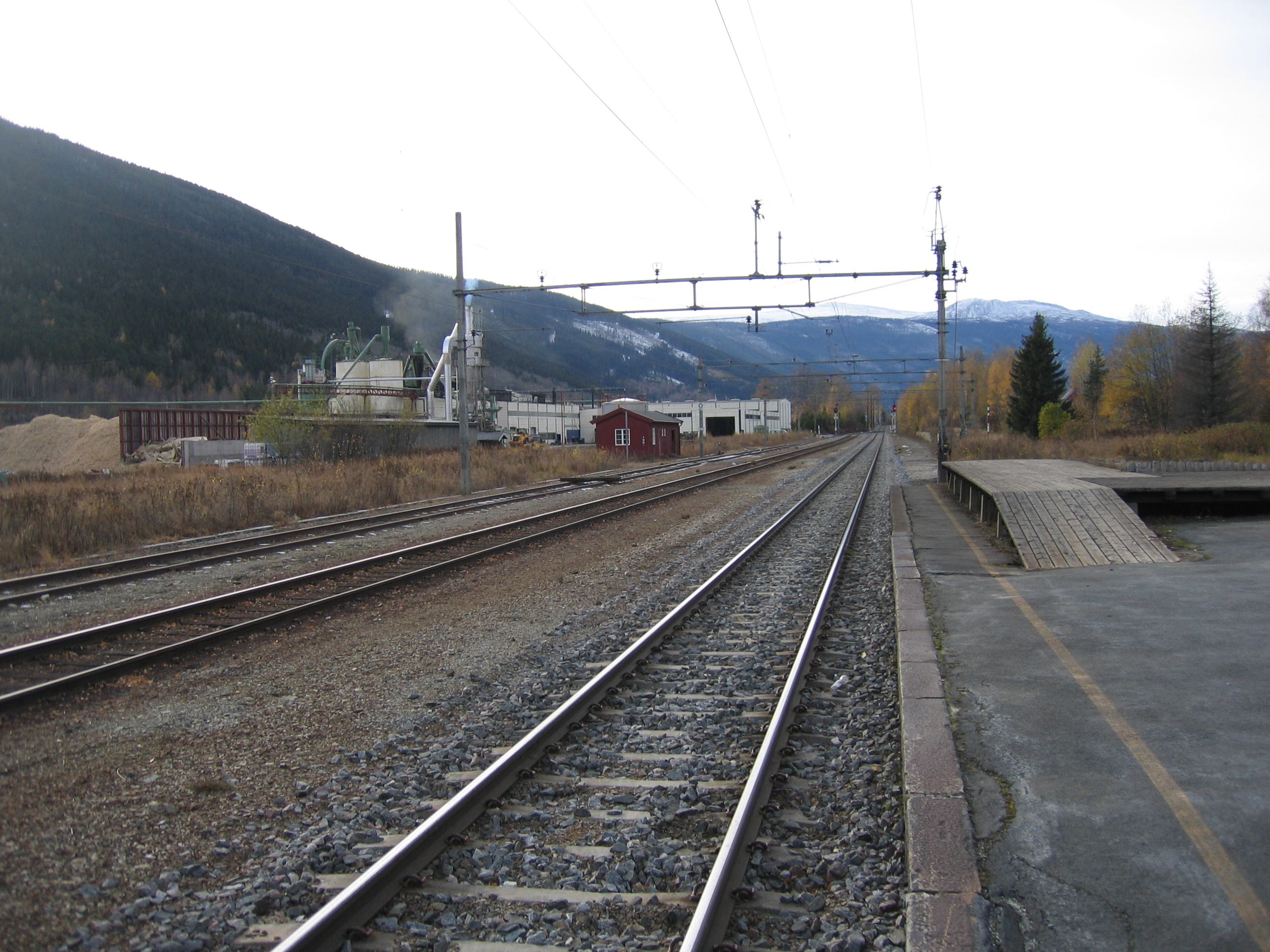
- Dovrebanen at Kvam Station

Overview
- Native name: Dovrebanen
- Owner: Bane NOR
- Termini: Eidsvoll; Trondheim S
- Stations: 25

Service
- Type: Railway
- Operator(s): SJ Norge; Vy; CargoNet
- Rolling stock: Class 73, El 14, El 16, El 18

History
- Opened: 1921, the original Dovre Line

Technical
- Line length: 553 km (344 mi)
- Number of tracks: Single or double
- Track gauge: 1,435 mm (4 ft 8 1/2 in)
- Electrification: 15 kV 16.7 Hz AC
- Operating speed: Oslo-Eidsvoll: Max. 200 kilometres per hour (120 mph); Oslo-Trondheim average: 80 kilometres per hour (50 mph)

The Dovre Line (Norwegian: Dovrebanen) is the name of three Norwegian railway lines to the historic city of Trondheim.

== Definition ==
- Dovre Line is the 484-kilometre (301 mi) main line between Eidsvoll Station and Trondheim Station, used by Jernbaneverket since 2008.
- Dovre Line is also the current name of the 548-kilometre (341 mi) main line of the Norwegian railway system (Jernbaneverket) between Oslo and Trondheim, used when referring to the long-distance passenger trains.
- Dovre Line was the name of the 209-kilometre (130 mi) main line between Dombås and Trondheim until 2008.

The most inclusive of these meanings of Dovre Line thus includes the other two. To complicate the pattern even more, the first use of the Dovre Line was on the section between Dombås and Støren, completed in 1921. When this last section of the new standard gauge main line between Oslo and Trondheim via Lillehammer and Dombås was opened in 1921, the originally 49-kilometre (30 mi) long narrow gauge section between Støren and Trondheim was made the northern part of the new Dovre Line. When talking about construction of railways in Norway, Dovre Line refers to the 158.1-kilometre (98.2 mi) long Dombås - Støren section.

== Sections of the most inclusive use of Dovre Line (Dovrebanen) ==
Section	Km	Original Name	Opened	Remark	Illustration
Oslo - Eidsvoll	64	Gardermobanen	1998	Replaced Hovedbanen	
Eidsvoll - Hamar	59	Eidsvold-Hamarbanen	1880		
Hamar - Tretten	88	Eidsvold-Trettenbanen	1894		
Tretten - Otta	83	Eidsvold-Ottabanen	1896		
Otta - Dombås	46	Eidsvold-Størenbanen/Syd	1913		
Dombås - Støren	158	Dovrebanen	1921		Hjerkinn station at the Dovre Line, 1970
Støren - Trondheim	51	Trondhjem-Størebanen	1864	Narrow gauge until 1919, dual until 1921	

== General description and short history ==
The section south of Eidsvoll was until 1998 Norway's first public railway, Hovedbanen, from 1854, 68 km long. The present line between Oslo and Eidsvoll is the 4 km shorter Gardermoen Line, the only high-speed line in the country. Hovedbanen is still in service for freight trains (and local commuters to Dal), but is not considered as a part of Dovre Line. The entire line from Oslo to Trondheim is 548 km today. It is a more heavily traveled line than the older Røros Line and electrification was completed 1 November 1970. Between 1935 and 1958, the Dovre Line was served by some of Norway's largest steam locomotives, the 2-8-4 NSB Class 49 "Dovregubben" ("Dovre Giant").

Compared to the Røros Line, the Dovre Line takes a more westerly course running through the town of Lillehammer and over the mountainous stretches of Dovre Municipality, before merging with the Røros Line again at Støren. There is one branch line, the Rauma Line which leaves the Dovre Line at Dombås.

To avoid the fairly regular river flooding on the railway line along the river Gaula, the Gulfoss Tunnel was completed in 1918 in the Hovin area of Melhus Municipality in what is now Trøndelag county.

On 14 August 2023, the line was severed when the Randklev Bridge, which crosses the Lågen River in Ringebu, slid into the river. The river was swallowed by floodwater, a result of Storm Hans. The bridge was 172m in length and was opened in 1957. It had been closed when the collapse occurred. An adjacent road bridge, which is a former railway bridge, was not affected by the floodwater, but it has been closed as a precautionary measure. The bridge was repaired, and reopened 20 May 2024.

The line was cut off again on 21 January 2025, due to the bridge south of Otta Station being closed off due to heavy ice accumulation around its foundations that weakened them. As of early February 2025 the line is not scheduled to resume services until mid-April 2025.

== Service ==
The Norwegian State Railways used to be the sole operator of passenger services on the Dovre Line. Since June 2020, the service is operated by SJ Norge under the brand "SJ Nord". In each direction they are four express trains between Oslo and Trondheim, of which two daily departures with the tilting Class 73 units, offering travel times down to 6 hours 37 minutes for an average of 80 km/h (50mph), with departures in the morning and afternoon. There is also a locomotive-hauled afternoon train and a night train with sleeper cars. In addition there is a morning service from Dombås to Oslo. At Dombås there is correspondence with Møre og Romsdal via the Rauma Line.

The southern part of the line has hourly departures with regional trains from Lillehammer to Oslo operated by Vy. In the northern end, the Dovre Line is served by the Trøndelag Commuter Rail.

== Accidents ==
The original Dovre Line was completed and officially opened on 17 September 1921. The inauguration ended on a tragic note when the train returning from the celebrations collided just after leaving Trondheim in the Nidareid train disaster the next day. The worst Norwegian railway disaster in peacetime also happened on the Dovre Line on 22 February 1975 when two trains collided one kilometer north of Tretten station, killing 27 people and wounding 25. There were approximately 800 people on the two trains.

== Plans ==
The section between Eidsvoll and Hamar is currently being rebuilt and partly realigned as a double track line capable of 200-250 km/h. Some sections has already been opened, and the whole section is scheduled to be complete by 2027.

Further north, there may be constructed some shorter double track sections between Hamar and Lillehammer. North of Lillehammer there are no plans for larger expansions. Longer crossing loops and renewal of the existing line and its infrastructure are the only plans in the foreseeable future.

== Driver's cab documentation ==
Several parts of the Dovre Line are documented through driver's cab recordings made by Norwegian locomotive engineers. These videos illustrate gradients, curvature, winter operations and the line's mountain profile. Full overview:
