= Bekkelaget (disambiguation) =

Bekkelaget is a borough in the city of Oslo, Norway.

Bekkelaget may also refer to:

== Places ==
- Bekkelaget, Innlandet, an urban village in Stange municipality, Innlandet county, Norway
- Bekkelaget Church, a church in the borough of Bekkelaget, Oslo, Norway
- Bekkelaget station, a former railway station in Oslo, Norway
- Bekkelaget Tunnel, a railway tunnel in Oslo, Norway

== Other ==
- Bekkelaget SK, a sports club in Oslo, Norway
