= Buchardt =

Buchardt is a German surname. Notable people with the surname include:

- Arthur Buchardt (born 1948), Norwegian businessman
- Friedrich Buchardt (1909–1982), Baltic German SS officer and MI6 agent

== See also ==
- Buchard
- Buzhardt
