= Petter Stordalen =

Norwegian billionaire businessman (born 1962)

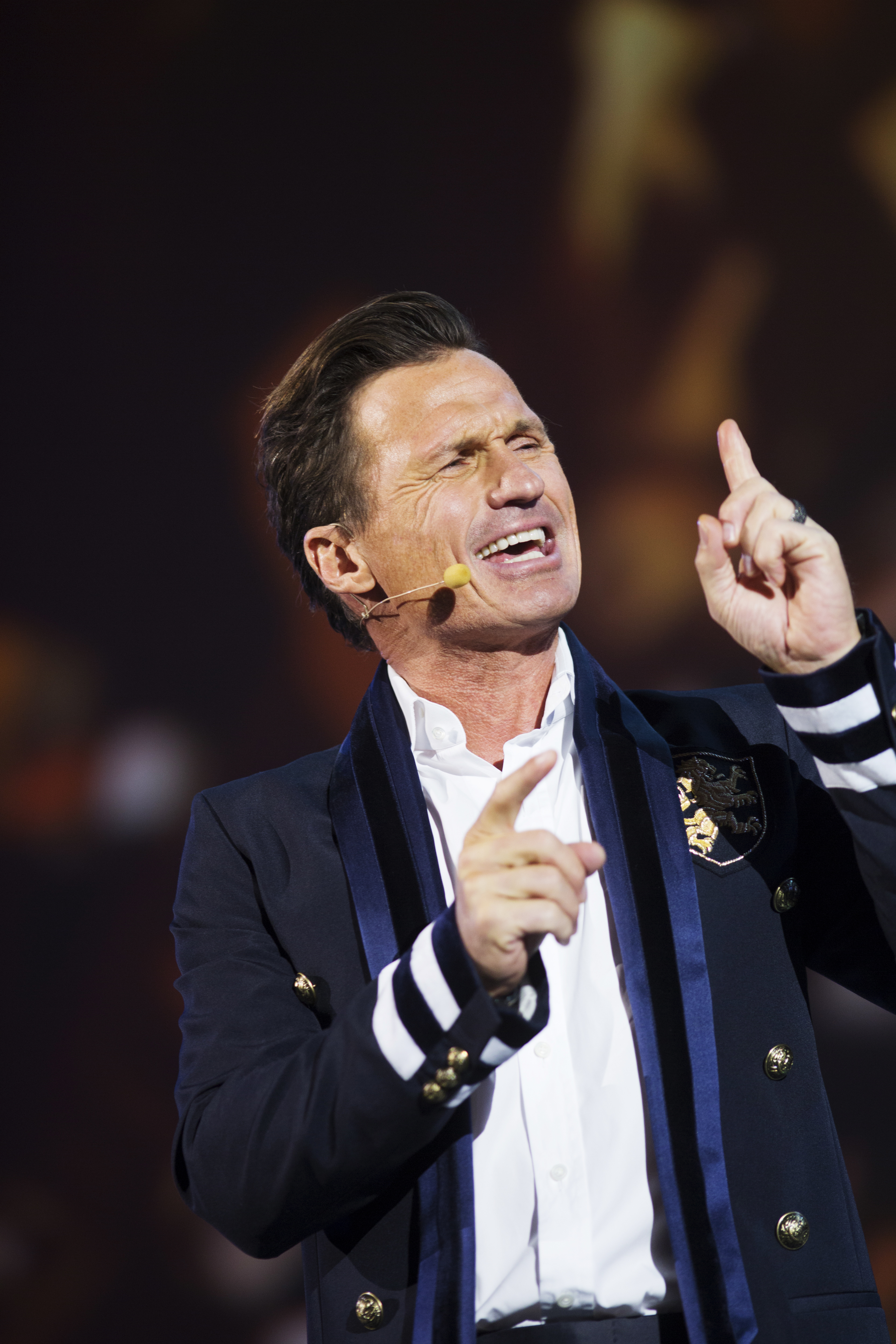
- Stordalen in 2018
- Born: Petter Anker Stordalen Bjorvand; 29 November 1962 (age 63); Porsgrunn, Norway
- Education: BI Norwegian Business School
- Occupation: Businessman
- Spouse: Ingrid Stordalen (married 1986-2003) Gunhild Stordalen (married 2010–2019)
- Partner: Märta Elander Wistén (2020–)
- Children: 3

Petter Anker Stordalen Bjorvand (born 29 November 1962) is a Norwegian businessman. With an estimated net worth of US$1.6 billion as of 2025, he is the owner of the Strawberry Group, a conglomerate of ten companies with holdings in hotels, shopping centers, real estate, finance, and art. Through Strawberry Hospitality Group, he owns Strawberry (formerly known as Nordic Choice Hotels), consisting of over 230 hotels and 17,000 employees.

In the later stages of his career, Stordalen had pursued philanthropic endeavors alongside his wife, doctor, and environmentalist Gunhild Stordalen; through their Stordalen Foundation, established in 2011, they have donated large amounts of money to various scientific research programs and charities focused on addressing climate change. He has been a co-owner of SunClass Airlines since 2019.

== Early life ==
Petter Anker Stordalen Bjorvand was born in Porsgrunn on 29 November 1962, the son of Kari and Knut Anker Stordalen (1933–1994). At the age of 12, he began selling strawberries at the local market. In 1974, the local Porsgrunns Dagblad newspaper named him Norway's top strawberry seller. Following high school, he attended Kjøpmannsinstituttet for one year, then managed his father's store for a short time before joining the Norwegian School of Marketing.

== Career ==
=== Shopping centers ===
At 24, he took over what was, at the time, the largest shopping center in Norway, City Syd, Trondheim. After posting record profits at City Syd, he became property director in the company Made in. Stordalen was the architect of the conversion of the market area in downtown Trondheim and the re-launch of the Liertoppen shopping centre outside Oslo. He was also put in charge of the Bik Bok brand.

Following transactions within the Brynestad system Stordalen, at the age of 29, he was an employee of Realkreditt's (later DnB) property development company. Stordalen bought the historical department store Steen & Strøm. The group recouped their investment of kr 20 million in the first five days of the reopening. In the span of three years, the company, Steen & Strøm Invest, became the country's largest holder of commercial real estate. The expansion lasted until 1996, when Stordalen had a falling out with the largest shareholder, Stein Erik Hagen, and was asked to leave his position as CEO.

=== Hotels ===
After leaving Steen & Strøm Invest, Stordalen teamed up with investor Christen Sveaas. In October 1996, the duo bought 68 percent of the shares of Choice Hotels for kr 100 million. Stordalen bought Swedish hotel chain Home as well as Norwegian hotel company InterNor and took Choice Hotels Scandinavia public. During a three-year period, Choice Hotels Scandinavia bought, on average, a new hotel every other week and added 50 people to the payroll every 10 days.

In December 1997, Sveaas sold his 37 percent share of the now 77 hotels. In 1999, Christian Ringnes and his company Eiendomsspar acquired a 35 percent share in Choice Hotels Scandinavia. Ringnes folded. The same year, Stordalen also acquired the Danish hotel company Nordisk Hotel Group, Stenungsbaden Yacht Club, and Stockholm Globe Hotel. At age 37, Stordalen became a billionaire (in Norwegian krone).

In 2012, Stordalen opened a hotel, Clarion Post Hotel, with 500 rooms and covered an area of 40,000 square metres (430,000 sq ft) in Gothenburg, Sweden. At the opening, 10,000 people were gathered to watch a light-and-fireworks display that included Stordalen ascending from the top of the hotel playing the drums inside a 6-by-6-metre (20 ft × 20 ft) disco ball. In 2022, Stordalen opened the 231-room, art-deco Somerro Hotel in Oslo, built from the 1930s office that previously belonged to Oslo Lysverker. The hotel featured a rooftop pool and terrace and is situated in Frogner.

=== Public to private company ===
In 2000, Stordalen formed the company Home Invest, consisting of the properties previously owned by Choice Hotels Scandinavia. The company went public but was delisted in 2001. In 2003, Choice Hotels Scandinavia bought shares in Swedish property owner and developer Capona. In 2004, Stordalen's Home Invest sold 19 hotel properties to Capona with a settlement in shares. In 2006, Capona changed its name to Home Properties. In 2005, Home Invest bought the remaining shares in Choice Hotels Scandinavia and delisted the company.

In 2006, Home Properties spun off Home Capital as an investment company and listed it on the First North Stock Exchange in Stockholm. In 2007, Stordalen's Home Invest acquired all the shares in Home Capital and delisted the company. In 2009, Stordalen did the same with Home Properties. In 2019, Nordic Choice Hotels acquired Kämp Collection Hotels.

== Investments ==
Petter Stordalen's corporate group Strawberry consists of:

- Strawberry Group: Investment company that owns Strawberry Hospitality Group, Strawberry Advisory, Strawberry Properties and Strawberry Art & Design. In 2015, enterprise value of Strawberry Group was estimated at kr 16.9 billion.
  - Strawberry Hospitality Group, owning Nordic Choice Hotels, has one of Scandinavia's largest hotel chains with 190 hotels in Norway, Sweden, Denmark, Finland, and the Baltics. The company had 13,000 employees and a turnover of kr 10.4 billion in 2015.
  - Strawberry Advisory: Owns Strawberry Capital and Strawberry Equity. Strawberry Capital, Home Capital until 2016, is an investment company, investing in listed and privately held companies in the Nordic capital market. Strawberry Equity is a private investment company, investing mainly in companies within the travel industry. In 2015, enterprise value of Strawberry Equity was estimated at kr 1.3 billion.
  - Strawberry Properties: Owns and develops 20 properties and 230,000 square metres (2,500,000 sq ft) valued at kr 5.6 billion.
  - Strawberry Art & Design: Stordalen's art investment company, owning more than 400 pieces of artwork.
- Strawberry Fields: Private real estate company, investing primarily in large cities in the Nordics. Estimated enterprise value in 2015 was kr 9.8 billion. Strawberry Fields owns Strawberry Forever and Strawberry Brothers.
  - Strawberry Forever: Real estate company, owning properties such as Quality Hotel Friends and Clarion Hotel Amaranten in Stockholm. Estimated enterprise value in 2015 is kr 6.2 billion.
  - Strawberry Brothers: Real estate company established in 2015 and owned 50/50 by Stordalen and Varner Invest AS, owning properties such as Quality Hotel Globe in Stockholm, Clarion Hotel Royal Christiania in Oslo and the Copenhagen Central Post Building. Estimated enterprise value in 2015 is kr 3.6 billion.
- Strawberry Future: Investments in sustainability related initiatives, projects, and organizations.
- PASAB: Joint venture with Norwegian property developers Anders and Arthur Buchardt, developing properties in Norway and Sweden.

=== Art collection ===
As his fortune grew, Stordalen started investing in art, mostly contemporary. His first purchase was a painting by the American artist Ross Bleckner. Stordalen had spent five million dollars on contemporary art on his two latest hotels alone, Clarion Hotel Post in Gothenburg and Clarion Hotel & Congress in Trondheim, and has a private collection that is valued at around 30 million dollars.

In January 2013, Stordalen opened a new hotel called The Thief in the Tjuvholmen neighborhood in Oslo. Every one of the 119 rooms has unique original art. In one of the elevators there is an animation by Julian Opie, one of Stordalen's favorite artists. The Thief has signed a sponsorship deal with the neighboring Astrup Fearnley Museum of Modern Art. Under the agreement, The Thief can borrow some signal work. Stordalen also owns some of Andy Warhol's interpretations of Norwegian artist Edvard Munch. The value of his total collections (private and business combined) has been evaluated to be valued at more than 50 million dollars.

== Business philosophy ==
The foundation for his business philosophy, coined The strawberry philosophy, stems from his memory of selling strawberries for his dad during his childhood summers. When complaining to his dad about the quality of the berries, his dad retorted, "Sell the berries you have, they are the only berries you can sell".

Stordalen hosts an annual winter conference for Nordic Choice managers that is usually held in Sweden. In addition to a big party that has previously included live camels and specially composed music and stage acts, Stordalen gives his employees a motivational speech that, in the media, has been likened to a religious revival.

== Awards ==
- Grand Travel Awards to Nordic for Best Scandinavian Hotel Chain (2007 and 2008) and Best Work Place (2007, 2008, 2009, 2010, and 2011)
- European Hotel Design Award 2008 for Stenungsbaden Yacht Club
- Sweden's most trusted brand 2008 from Reader's Digest – European Trusted Brands for Selma SPA
- Customer Excellence Award 2008 from Microsoft Business Solutions for Choice
- Ernst & Young Entrepreneur of the Year 2010
- Brightest Business Mind in Northern Europe 2016 by Nordic Business Forum
- Leader of the Year 2017, Grand Travel Award Sweden

== Environmentalism ==
Stordalen supported the Bellona Foundation to free their expert Alexander Nikitin, who had been charged with treason for his contributions to a Bellona report on nuclear safety within the Russian Northern Fleet. In 2002, he broke into Sellafield, a British nuclear treatment plant, and chained himself to the bridge of the plant for nine hours to protest the discharging of the radioactive element technetium-99 into the sea. In 2007, he was charged with trespassing after entering a restricted area in Malmøyakalven to protest the dumping of toxic mud in the Oslofjord.

Together with his wife, Gunhild Stordalen, he founded the Stordalen Foundation. At the annual environmental organization Zero-conference in 2011, the couple secured their personal acquaintance Arnold Schwarzenegger as keynote speaker. The foundation also supports the European Climate Foundation (ECF); his wife Gunhild Anker Stordalen serves on the organization's supervisory committee. In January 2012, the couple participated in Al Gore's Climate Reality Project's expedition to the Antarctic

In June 2011, the couple founded GreeNudge. The foundation was to give decision-makers information for informing them to create climate policies.

All hotels in Stordalen's hotel company, Nordic Choice Hotels, are certified according to the ISO 14001 standard.

== Personal life ==
Stordalen resides in Oslo. From his first marriage between the years 1986-2003 to Ingrid Stordalen (maiden name Ingrid Fuglehaug), he has a daughter named Emilie and two sons named Henrik and Jakob.

Stordalen began dating doctor and former model Gunhild Stordalen in the mid-2000s. He proposed on top of Aspen Mountain on New Year's Eve 2008, and they were married on 12 June 2010. The wedding was held in Marrakesh and cost the equivalent of US$5 million, making it Scandinavia's most expensive wedding. The ceremony included chartering an airplane for the guests and booking every room in La Mamounia, one of the world's finest luxury hotels. The wedding was officiated by Irish musician Bob Geldof, with 240 of Norway's foremost celebrities attending. Norway's largest tabloid, Verdens Gang, opened a digital guestbook on its website for the public to leave well wishes. The couple were dubbed "the Bill and Melinda Gates of Norway" by the Norwegian tabloids for their combination of business and philanthropy. In November 2019, they announced that they had separated but would remain friends and collaborators.

Following the 2011 Utøya shooting, Stordalen donated 5 million kroner to the Workers' Youth League to rebuild the summer camp.

== Bibliography ==
- Jeg skal fortelle deg min hemmelighet. Published 2015.
