= Isabelle Ringnes =

Norwegian businessperson

Isabelle Ringnes (born 1988) is a Norwegian businessperson.

She is a daughter of investor Christian Ringnes. She studied for three years at the BI Norwegian Business School, before taking a master's degree in media management in New York City. In 2015 she returned to Norway and founded TENK ("Tech-Nettverket for Kvinner").

In 2019, Ringnes and Marie Louise Sunde published the book Hvem spanderer? Fordommene du ikke visste du hadde (English title: She's Got This – The Prejudices You Didn't Know You Had) through Gyldendal. The book sought to promote financial gender equality. Ringnes and Sunde founded the company Equality Check, which Ringnes left in 2022.

She was recruited as a political candidate for the Conservative Party in 2023, but found that their political positions did not align, and joined the Liberal Party instead.

== Personal life ==
With Skage Grønneberg, Ringnes had two sons in 2023 and 2024. They bought a house at Ormøya in 2019, sold it and bought another in the vicinity in 2020.
