= Nordstrand =

Nordstrand may refer to:

== Places ==
Germany

- Nordstrand, Germany, a peninsula in Germany
- Nordstrand (Amt), a former municipality in Nordfriesland, Germany

Norway

- Nordstrand, Norway, a borough in Oslo, Norway
- Søndre Nordstrand, a borough in Oslo, Norway
- Nordstrand Church, a church in Oslo, Norway
- Nordstrand IF, a sports club in Oslo, Norway
- Nordstrand Station, a railway station in Oslo, Norway
- Nordstrand, Møre og Romsdal, a village in Giske, Norway

== People ==
- Morten Nordstrand, a Danish professional footballer
- Rickard Nordstrand, a Swedish kickboxer

== See also ==
- Nordstrands Blad, a newspaper in Oslo, Norway
