= Bekkelaget station =

Former railway station in Nordstrand, Norway

Bekkelaget
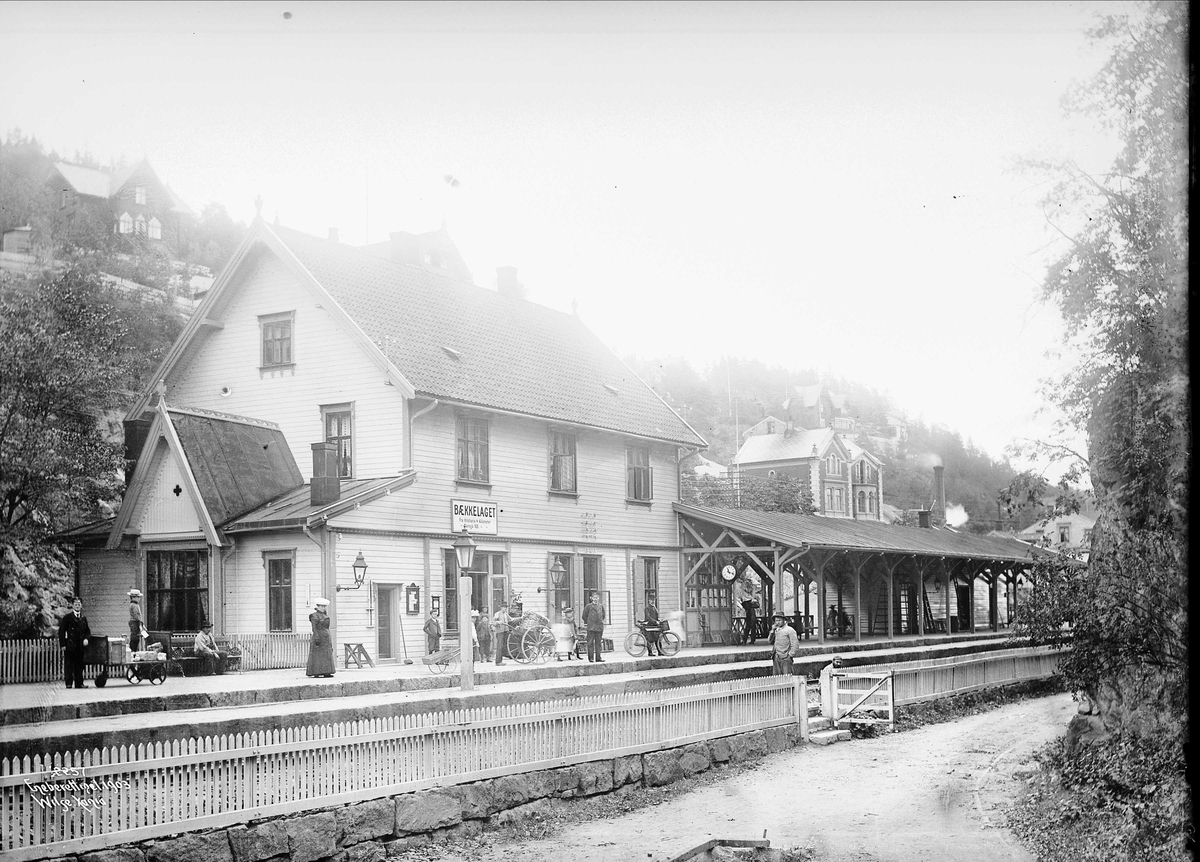
- The station in 1903

General information
- Location: Nedre Bekkelaget, Nordstrand, Oslo; Norway
- Coordinates: 59°53′00″N 10°46′13″E
- Elevation: 15 m (49 ft) AMSL
- Operator: Norwegian State Railways
- Line: Østfold Line
- Distance: 3.34 km (2.08 mi) (1879–1958); 3.80 km (2.36 mi) (1958–83) from Oslo S
- Platforms: 2

Construction
- Architect: Peter Andreas Blix

History
- Opened: 2 January 1879; 147 years ago
- Closed: 29 May 1983; 43 years ago
- Rebuilt: 7 September 1958
- Electrified: 9 December 1936
Location
- Location within Oslo Location within Norway

Bekkelaget Station (Norwegian: Bekkelaget stasjon) was a railway station on the Østfold Line. It was located at Nedre Bekkelaget in the Nordstrand borough of Oslo, Norway. It was originally situated 3.34 kilometers (2.08 mi) from Oslo Central Station (Oslo S) and received a station building designed by Peter Andreas Blix. It was named Bækkelaget until 1921.

Bekkelaget was used as a commuter station. With the arrival of the railway, the lower portions of Bekkelaget could be built out with housing. After the Bekkelaget Slide on 7 October 1953 resulted in the Bekkelaget Tunnel being built past the station. It opened on 7 September 1958. At the same time the station was moved 460 meters (1,510 ft) southwards, so the southern mouth of the tunnel. The station was closed on 29 May 1983.

== History ==
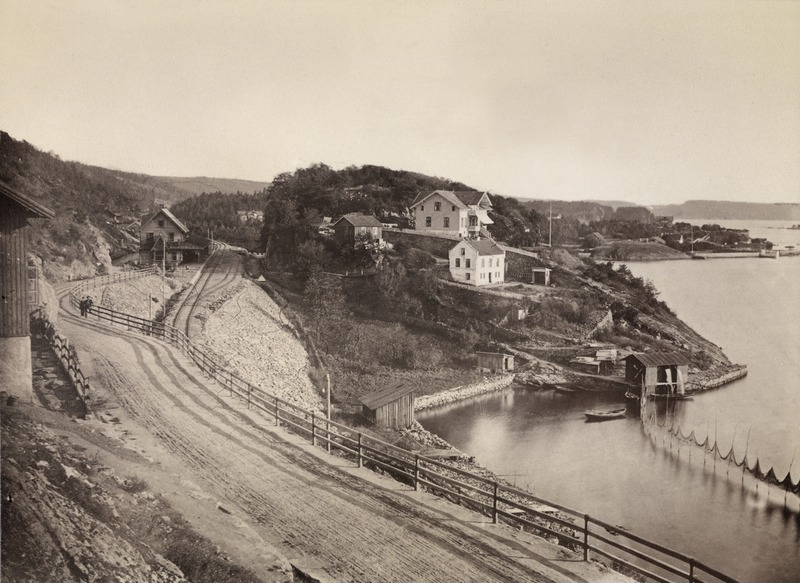
The station in 1880

The station opened as Lian on 2 January 1879, the same day as the rest of the Østfold Line. It originally received a station building designed by Peter Andreas Blix. Later that year a commuter rail service started to Bekkelaget, and was extended to Ljan in 1880. This made Bekkelaget an attractive place for people to build houses, as it was then possible to commute to the city. Residential development therefore started after the commuter train services were introduced. The area received single dwellings, with construction starting near the station and gradually spreading upwards toward Bekkelagshøgda.

A simplified interlocking system was installed on 1 January 1901. The station was originally named Bækkelaget, but took a new spelling in April 1921. The section past Bekkelaget was rebuilt with double track during the 1920s. The first stage, from Bekkelaget to Ljan, was completed on 1 July 1924. The section from Oslo Ø to Bekkelaget was completed on 15 May 1929. As part of this a new, fail-proof interlocking system became operational in December 1926. The line past Bekkelaget was electrified on 9 December 1936.

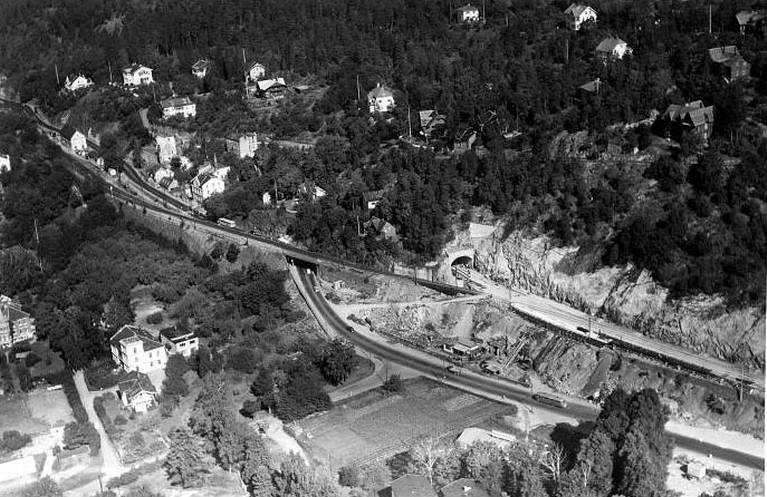
Construction of the Bekkelaget Tunnel and the new station in 1958. The old station to the left.

The Bekkelaget Slide took place on 7 October 1953, when a section of the ground under the Østfold Line and Mosseveien slid and killed five people in a bus. NSB was aware of the poor conditions in the ground and had been considering building a tunnel past a section which included the station. The slide was therefore not decisive in deciding to build the tunnel, but rather accelerated the decision to build it. A zoning plan had been decided upon in 1946 and the land had already been expropriated. Part of the land used by the railway was instead taken over and used by Mosseveien. This included demolishing the station building. Local residents protested and NSB agreed to build a new halt at the southern entrance of the tunnel, 460 meters (1,510 ft) south of the former station. The new station costs 340,000 kroner, and way paid jointly by NSB and Oslo Municipality. The new station and tunnel both opened on 7 September 1958. The station remained in use until 29 May 1983.

== Facilities ==
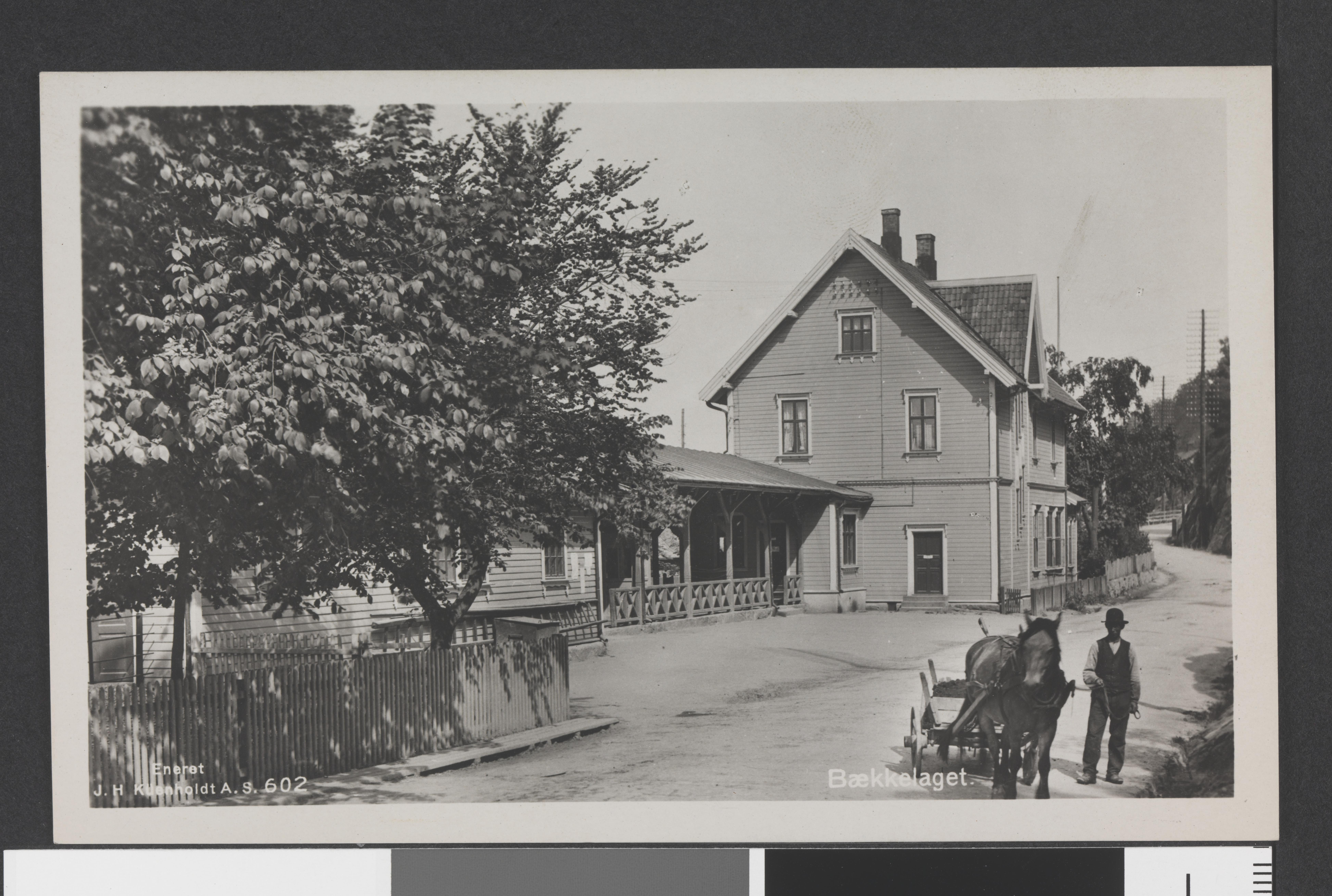
The station as seen from the road

The original station was situated 3.34 kilometers (2.08 mi) from Oslo S, at an elevation of 15 meters (49 ft) above mean sea level. The station building was designed by Peter Andreas Blix. It was among the first on the Østfold Line to be designed and has some of the most costly and spacious buildings in comparison with the expected traffic. The wooden station building had a strong Medieval stylistic influence.

The second station was a mere halt with platforms. It was situated at 3.80 kilometers (2.36 mi) from Oslo S at the southern mouth of the Bekkelaget Tunnel.

== Bibliography ==
- Bjerke, Thor; Holom, Finn (2004). Banedata 2004 (in Norwegian). Hamar / Oslo: Norwegian Railway Museum / Norwegian Railway Club. ISBN 82-90286-28-7.
- Johannessen, Finn Erhard (2000). Utsikt over Nordstrands historie (in Norwegian). Oslo: Nordstrand Vel. ISBN 82-7847-061-8.
- Hartmann, Eivind; Mangset, Øistein; Reisegg, Øyvind (1997). Neste stasjon (in Norwegian). Gyldendal. ISBN 82-05-25294-7.
- Langård, Geir-Widar; Ruud, Leif-Harald (2005). Sydbaneracer og Skandiapil – Glimt fra Østfoldbanen gjennom 125 år (in Norwegian). Oslo: Norwegian Railway Club. ISBN 978-82-90286-29-8.

Preceding station		Following station
Oslo S	Østfold Line	Nordstrand
