= Gunhild Stordalen =

Norwegian physician and environmental advocate

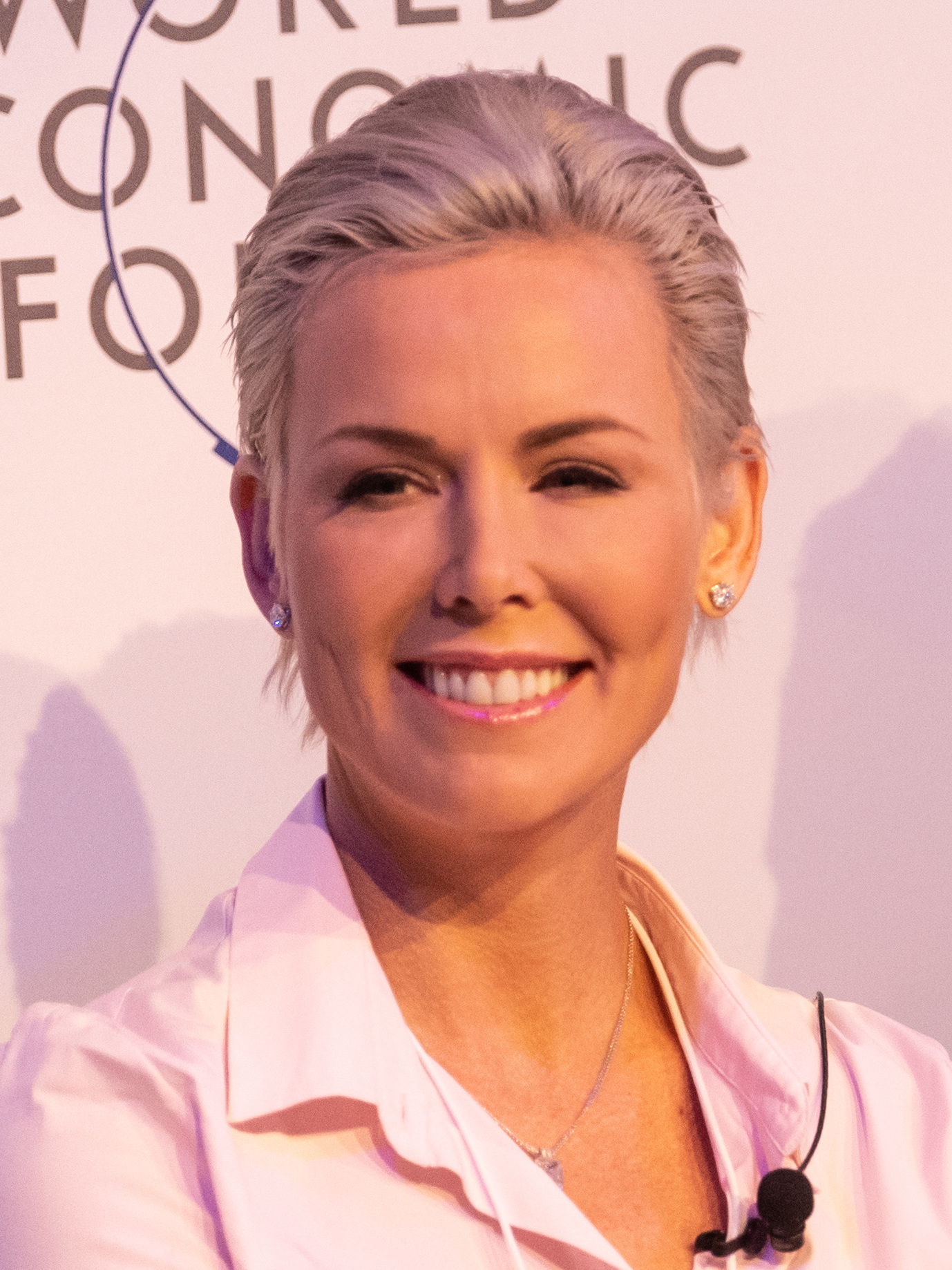
- Stordalen during the WEF 2019
- Born: 15 January 1979 (age 47); Haugesund, Norway
- Other name: Gunhild Melhus
- Occupations: Physician, advocate
- Known for: Founder and president of EAT Foundation, Co-founder of Stordalen Foundation and CEO of GreeNudge
- Spouse: Petter Stordalen (m. 2010)

Gunhild Anker Stordalen (née Melhus, born 15 January 1979) is a Norwegian physician and environmental advocate. She is the founder and executive chair of EAT Foundation, the co-founder and chair of the philanthropic Stordalen Foundation, the founder of GreeNudge and serves on the board of several commercial and nonprofit organizations. She has been engaged in public debate on issues like climate change and public health and has focused on transforming the global food system.

== Early life and education ==
The daughter of a doctor and a civil engineer, she was born in Haugesund and raised in the sparsely populated hamlet of Muggerud outside Kongsberg. According to an interview with Dagbladet in 2010, she grew up in an anti-materialistic and pacifist household and was involved with environmental issues from an early age.

Stordalen graduated from Kongsberg secondary school in 1998. She enrolled at the medical faculty of the University of Oslo in 2000, and joined the medical research program. She received her MD (cand.med.) in 2007. During her time at University, she worked with sexual awareness information for youths (Medisinernes Seksualopplysning) as well as an expert panelist on NRK's radio program Juntafil, a show with 250,000 listeners that answers young Norwegians' sometimes very explicit sexual questions. Stordalen also worked as a model during her time at University.

In 2007, Stordalen enrolled in the PhD program at the Institute of Pathology Oslo University Hospital (Rikshospitalet) and in 2010 defended her doctoral thesis Molecular studies on bone with focus on fracture healing in experimental osteoporosis in the field of pathology and orthopedics.

== Environmentalism ==
The Stordalen Foundation, which she co-founded with her then husband Petter Stordalen in 2011, focuses primarily on climate change and Stordalen has written several op-eds on the subject.

The Stordalen foundation focuses on four separate areas:

- The Rainforest Foundation
- Zero Emission Resource Organisation (ZERO): The Stordalen foundation supports the non-profit environmental organization Zero. Stordalen serves on the board of directors of the organization.
- GreeNudge: In June 2011 the couple founded GreeNudge, a non-profit initiative that will initiate and support behavioral research related to energy efficiency and climate change, in order to provide evidence-based data as a basis for decision makers to implement effective climate policies.

Stordalen was an Earth Hour ambassador in 2011. for Norway.

=== Animal welfare ===
Stordalen is also an advocate for animal rights and refused to do an interview with Elle until they changed their policy on their use of fur and has spoken out against the fur industry on several occasions, she has also contributed at catwalk shows for the Norwegian Animal Welfare Alliance.

=== Women's health ===
As the spokesperson of the Norwegian Heart and Lung Patient Organization (LHL), she campaigned to raise awareness of heart conditions affecting women. She has also educated the public on numerous occasions about the subject of her thesis, osteoporosis.

== EAT Foundation ==
In 2013, Stordalen founded the EAT Initiative with the idea of transforming the global food system to ensure the growing population a healthy and nutritious diet within safe environmental limits. In 2014, together with the Stordalen Foundation and the Stockholm Resilience Center she hosted the first EAT Stockholm Food Forum, dealing with the connection between food, health and sustainability. The participants included Charles, Prince of Wales, who spoke via a link on the theme of 'The global food system: A sustainable future', former US President Bill Clinton, who gave the keynote speech, and Professor Hans Rosling. Prince Daniel, Duke of Västergötland and Mette-Marit, Crown Princess of Norway took part in a discussion from a consumer perspective on food and health. Following this, the Wellcome Trust joined Stockholm Resilience Center and the Stordalen Foundation in launching the independent EAT Foundation in March 2016. This enabled the EAT Stockholm Food Forum to become an annual event. To broaden its reach and spread the message, EAT Foundation, for the first time, organized a food forum outside of Stockholm, namely in Jakarta, Indonesia in October 2017.

== Illness ==
On 22 October 2014, Stordalen was diagnosed with systemic sclerosis and has since been undergoing treatment for the disease.

== Recognitions and directorships ==
In 2012 Stordalen was named the youngest woman on Kapital's annual list over the 100 most influential women of Norway. In 2014 WWF Sweden named Gunhild Stordalen as Environmental Hero of the Year and in 2016 she was recognized among the 150 most influential business communicators in Sweden. She is a Young Global Leader of the World Economic Food Forum and was one of 29 leaders selected by United Nations Secretary-General ban Ki-moon in 2016 to provide inspiration and direction for the Scaling Up Nutrition Movement and its mission in eradicating malnutrition. In 2016, Gunhild Stordalen was also awarded with the Norwegian Fredrikkeprisen, the Norwegian Women's Sanitation Association's award.

In addition to being both the founder and president of EAT Foundation, Gunhild is also the founder and chair of the environmental organization GreeNudge and sits on several boards. These include Nordic Choice Hotel Group, Scaling Up Nutrition (SUN), Movement Lead Group, World Economic Forum's Global Future Council (on the Future of Food Security and Agriculture), ECOHZ Renewable Energy Foundation, BT Group's Committee for Sustainable and Responsible Business, the climate initiative DrawDown and the international advisory board of the Stockholm Resilience Center.

== Bibliography ==
- Melhus G, Solberg LB, Dimmen S, Madsen JE, Nordsletten L, Reinholt FP (2007). "Experimental osteoporosis induced by ovariectomy and vitamin D deficiency does not markedly affect fracture healing in rats" (PDF). Acta Orthopaedica. 78 (3): 393–403. doi:10.1080/17453670710013988. hdl:10852/27880. PMID 17611855.
- Solberg LB, Melhus G, Brorson SH, Wendel M, Reinholt FP (2006). "Heat-induced retrieval of immunogold labeling for nucleobindin and osteoadherin from Lowicryl sections of bone". Micron. 37 (4): 347–54. doi:10.1016/j.micron.2005.11.010. PMID 16387503.
- Melhus G, Brorson SH, Baekkevold ES, Andersson G, Jemtland R, Olstad OK, Reinholt FP (2010). "Gene expression and distribution of key bone turnover markers in the callus of estrogen-deficient, vitamin D-depleted rats". Calcified Tissue International. 87 (1): 77–89. doi:10.1007/s00223-010-9371-2. PMC 2887935. PMID 20495792.
- Nissen-Meyer LS, Svalheim S, Taubøll E, Reppe S, Lekva T, Solberg LB, Melhus G, Reinholt FP, Gjerstad L, Jemtland R (2007). "Levetiracetam, phenytoin, and valproate act differently on rat bone mass, structure, and metabolism". Epilepsia. 48 (10): 1850–60. doi:10.1111/j.1528-1167.2007.01176.x. PMID 17634065.
