= Buchard =

Buchard is a French surname. Notable people with the surname include:

- Amandine Buchard (born 1995), French judoka
- Georges Buchard (1893–1987), French fencer
- Gustave Buchard (1890–1977), French fencer

== See also ==
- Bouchard
- Buchardt
