= Ormøya =

Island in Oslo, Norway

Coordinates: 59°52′37″N 10°45′37″E

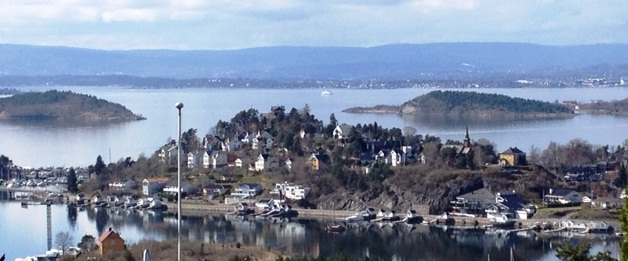
Ormøya seen from Bekkelaget. The bridge over the strait to Malmøya to the left.

Ormøya is an inhabited island in the inner part of Oslofjord, in the municipality of Oslo. It is located north of the island Malmøya and west of the mainland at Bekkelaget / Nordstrand. A bridge over the strait Ormsundet connects the island to the mainland. The island covers an area of 0.18 square kilometres (0.069 sq mi) Ormøy Church, designed by architect Bernhard Steckmest, was built in the 1890s. On the island there are beaches, boating ports and a small park.

Ormøya belonged to Aker kommune before Aker was incorporated in Oslo in 1948.

== The name ==
The first element is orm 'snake' (here probably referring to Vipera berus) - the last element is the finite form of øy 'island'. The strait between the island and the mainland has the name Ormsund (Norwegian sund = sound).
