= Bekkelaget Tunnel =

Railway tunnel in Oslo, Norway

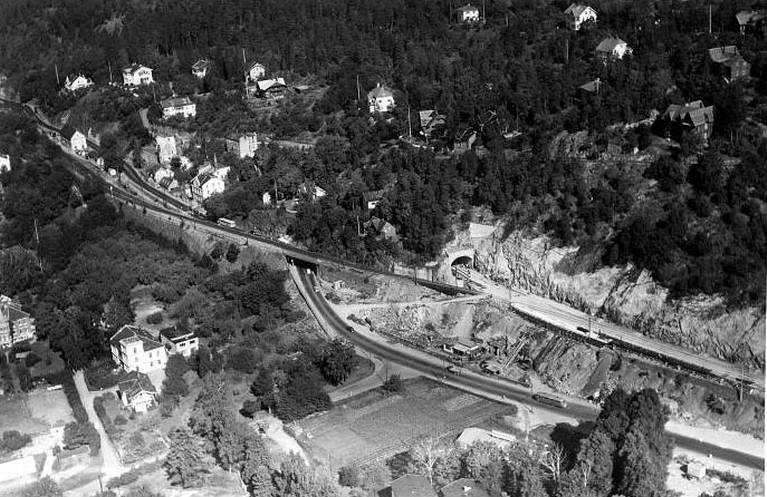
- The southern mouth in 1958, with the new station. The old Bekkelaget Station is to the left.
- Interactive map of Bekkelaget Tunnel

Overview
- Official name: Bekkelagstunnelen
- Line: Østfold Line
- Location: Bekkelaget, Oslo, Norway
- Coordinates: 59.8850°N 10.7707°E

Operation
- Work began: 14 April 1955
- Opened: 7 September 1958
- Owner: Norwegian National Rail Administration

Technical
- Length: 578 m (1,896 ft)
- No. of tracks: Double
- Track gauge: Standard gauge
- Electrified: 15 kV 16.7 Hz AC
- Width: 9.55 m (31.3 ft)
- Grade: 1.0 %

The Bekkelaget Tunnel (Norwegian: Bekkelagstunnelen) is a 578-meter (1,896 ft) long railway tunnel which carries two tracks of the Østfold Line past Bekkelaget in Oslo, Norway. Construction started 14 April 1955, after a landslide on 3 October 1953 had caused damage to the railway. The tunnel was built to allow for space for the road of Mosseveien. The tunnel opened on 7 October 1958. Bekkelaget Station was located on the section of track which was closed, and a new station was built at the southern mouth. It closed on 29 May 1983.

== Specifications ==
The Bekkelaget Tunnel is 578 meters (1,896 ft) long and runs through the mountainside through Bekkelaget, carrying the double-tracked Østfold Line. The tunnel is 9.55 meters (31.3 ft) wide and is electrified at 15 kV 16.7 Hz AC. Its northern end is situated 3.08 kilometers (1.91 mi) from Oslo Central Station (Oslo S). The tunnel has a minimum curve radius of 400 meters (1,300 ft) and a gradient of 1.0 percent climbing southwards.

== History ==
The Østfold Line opened on 2 January 1879. Through Bekkelaget it originally ran in a day section along a right-of-way slightly elevated above Mosseveien. A landslide took place on 7 October 1953, in which both part of the railway tracks and the road were caught. More than eighty people were in the zone, but only five people were killed—four in a bus and one from a heart attack on a train. The temporary solution was to blast a 300-meter (980 ft) shelf into the hillside and move the tracks further in. Work commenced on 9 October and trains could pass on 24 October.

NSB had previously been looking at possibilities of bypassing Bekkelaget with a tunnel. A zoning plan from 1946 called for the widening of Mosseveien and expropriation for this had already taken place. NSB was after the slide of the opinion that the railway could be repaired easily and that with investments of 700,000 Norwegian kroner the area could be secured to allow trains to pass on the new shelf. The Public Roads Administration was of a different opinion. They wanted to widen Mosseveien and needed the area the railway occupied for this widening. They, NSB and the Port of Oslo started negotiations in late 1953. The latter two pressed for the railway to be place in a tunnel to free up space for the road. NSB was not opposed to placing the line in a tunnel, but was not willing to pay the extra cost. Several tunnel alternatives were discussed, including one which would run from near Oslo East Station to Hauketo Station, about 7 kilometers (4 mi). The issue eventually reached a political level and was approved by the government on 24 December 1954.

The compromise involved that Oslo Municipality and Akershus County Road Administration would pay for the costs exceeding those which had run it the line had been built along the former right-of-way. The new tunnel received a minimum curve radius of 400 meters (1,300 ft), less than the former line. The curvature made the Østfold Line 22.4 meters (73 ft) longer. As Bekkelaget Station was located on the part of the line which would be bypassed, NSB proposed closing the station. Local residents protested and NSB agreed to build a new halt at the southern entrance of the tunnel, 460 meters (1,510 ft) south of the former station. The new station costs 340,000 kroner, and way paid jointly by NSB and Oslo Municipality. This station was ultimately closed on 29 May 1983.

Construction of the tunnel began on 14 April 1955 and was contracted to Brødrene Hauge. It was originally planned to be completed on 1 August 1956, but it soon proved impossible to follow the schedule. The rock was of poorer conditions than originally thought. The porous rock meant that there was a need to repeatedly build support columns, slowing progress. By the start of 1956, 350 meters (1,150 ft) had been blasted. The breakthrough took place on 8 March 1956. The original blasting had only created a narrow profile and the rest of the work went to widening it. A 180-meter (590 ft) cutting was made on the south side of the tunnel, to make a place for the station. The concrete walls were finished in November 1957. A road bridge was built over the northern entrance to allow Mosseveien to pass over, and when it was completed the tracks and wiring could be installed. The tunnel became operational on 7 September 1958. The same day the old Bekkelaget Station closed and the new one opened and the old tracks were abandoned. Construction continued for another year with the demolishing of the old right-of-way and widening of Mosseveien. Total costs were 7.4 million kroner, of which NSBn paid 950,000.
