= Ormøy Church =

Coordinates: 59°52′36.15″N 10°45′44.25″E

- Ormøy kirke
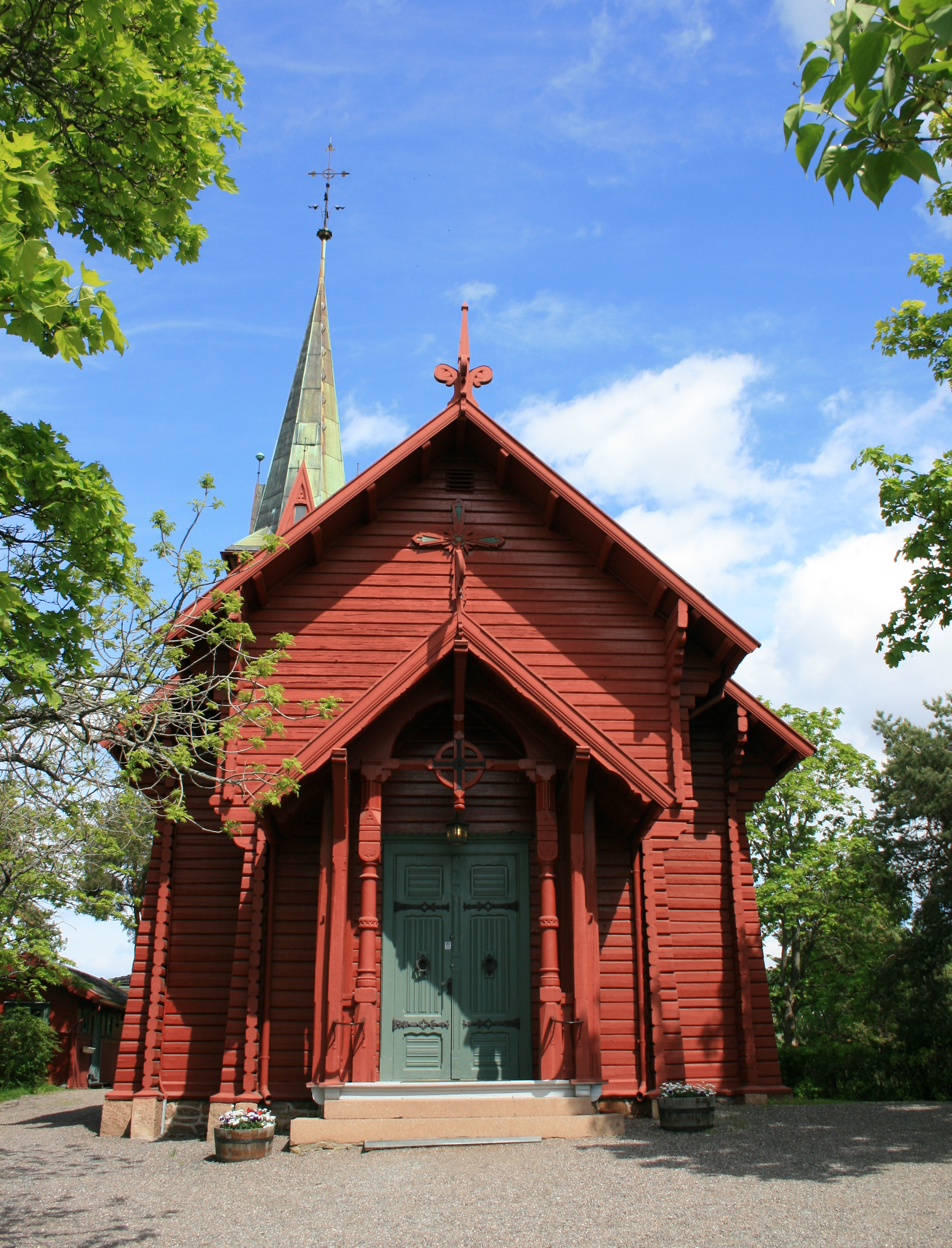

- Location within Oslo Location within Norway
- Location: Ormøya; Oslo,
- Country: Norway
- Denomination: Church of Norway
- Churchmanship: Evangelical Lutheran
- Website: www.oslo.kirken.no

History
- Status: Parish church
- Consecrated: 1893

Architecture
- Functional status: Active
- Architect: Bernhard Steckmest
- Architectural type: Log house
- Style: Gothic, Swiss chalet

Specifications
- Capacity: 130 seats
- Materials: Wood

Administration
- Diocese: Diocese of Oslo
- Deanery: Søndre Aker
- Parish: Bekkelaget og Ormøy

Ormøy Church is a church on the island of Ormøya in Oslo, Norway. It was built of wood in 1893 and has 200 seats. The church is listed by the Norwegian Directorate for Cultural Heritage. The architectural drawings was made by the German architect Bernhard Steckmest and built in a log technique, characterized by gothic and Swiss chalet style. The outer walls are painted red, while the interior is stained brown and oiled.

The pictures of the Four Evangelists are recessed in the pulpit and was painted by Trygve Torkildsen. The small church organ was made in 1924.

On the night of September 19, 1992, the church was set on fire, but a quick reaction from a watchman prevented the church from burning down.

== Sources ==
- Knut Are Tvedt (ed.): Oslo byleksikon, Kunnskapsforlaget, Oslo 2010 (page 319) ISBN 9788257317607
- Pedersen, Gunnar: «Aktuell historie» i Nordstrands Blad, January 30, 2006 (in Norwegian).
