= Wenches jul =

Studio album by Wenche Myhre
- Released: 1991
- Genre: Christmas
- Label: CNR Records

Wenche Myhre chronology
Dagen er din (1985)	Wenches jul (1991)	La meg være ung (1993)

Wenches jul is a 1991 Christmas album by Wenche Myhre. It was rereleased in 2003.

In 1992, a Swedish-language version of the album was also recorded.

== Track listing ==
=== Side A ===
1. Christmas medley (3:09)
  1. Hei, hå, nå er det jul igjen
  2. Bjelleklang (Jingle Bells)
  3. Jeg så mamma kysse nissen (I Saw Mommy Kissing Santa Claus)
  4. Snømannen Kalle (Frosty the Snowman)
2. Eventyrland / Sledeturen (2:45)
3. Julenissen tror jeg på (I Believe in Santa Claus) (3:23), duet with Christer Sjögren
4. Min barndoms hvite jul (3:36)
5. Her kommer nissefar (1:56)

=== Side B ===
1. Det største vi kan få (3:40), duett med Tor Endresen
2. Julenissen kommer i kveld (Santa Claus is Coming to Town) (1:47), guitar solo by Pete Knutsen
3. Et lys imot mørketida (3:17)
4. Varm sjokolade (0:14), med Fam Myhre-Broberg
5. Kom til Vinterland (2:12), duett med Fam Myhre-Broberg
6. Stjernen i det blå (3:51)
7. Den fineste dagen på jord (4:09)
8. La det snø, la det snø, la det snø (Let It Snow) (2:15), trombone solo Frode Thingnæs
9. Alt jeg ønsker til den søte julefest (0:50), med Edvard Askeland (kontrabass) & Frode Thingnæs (trombone)

== Chart positions ==
Chart (1991)	Peak position
Norway (VG-lista)	12
