= Malmøya og Malmøykalven Nature Reserve =

Norwegian nature reserve

Coordinates: 59.8650°N 10.7489°E

- IUCN category Ia (strict nature reserve)
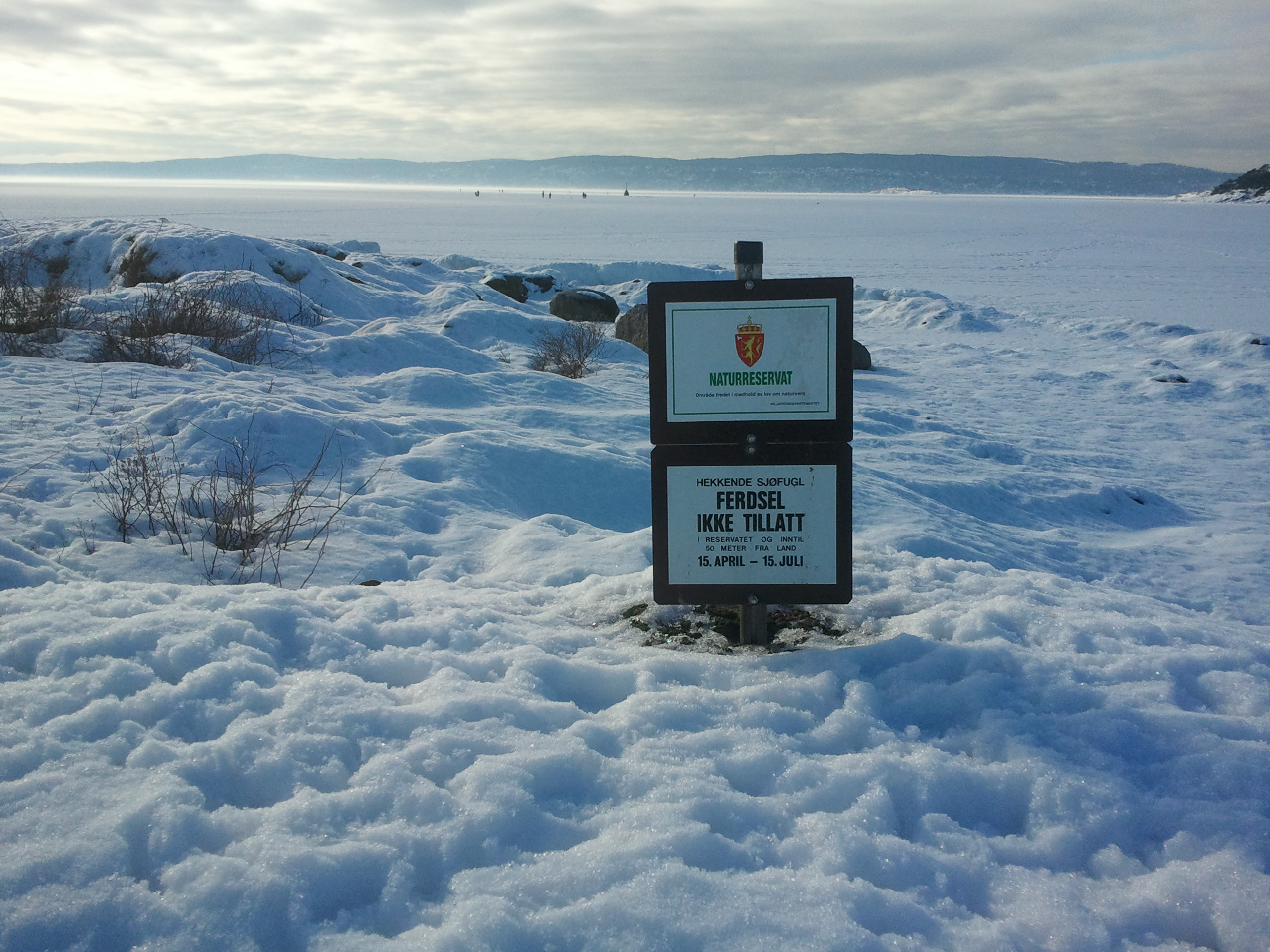
- From Malmøyskjær
- Interactive map of Malmøya og Malmøykalven Nature Reserve

Malmøya og Malmøykalven Nature Reserve is a nature reserve established in 2008 in the municipality of Oslo, Norway.

The nature reserve consists of parts of the island of Malmøya, the island of Malmøykalven, and a water zone which includes the skerries of Malmøyskjær and Hertugskjær. It covers an area of about 0.509 km², of which 0.274 km² is land area. The nature reserve contains geological locations with scientifically important fossils from Cambrian and Silurian, particular vegetation types, and is an important nesting site for seabirds.
