= Wenche Myhre =

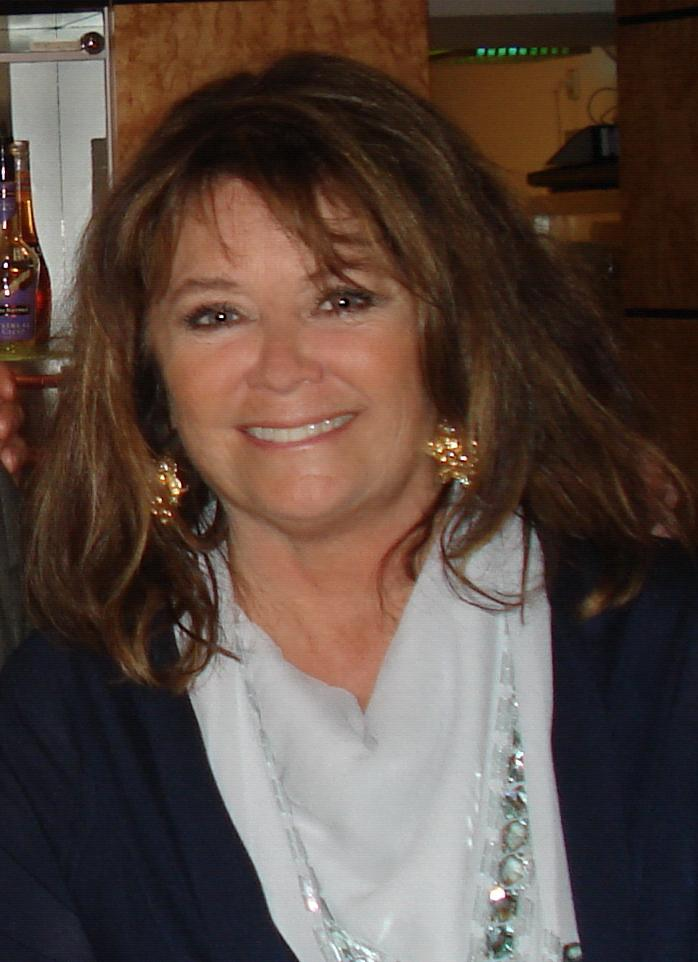

Background information
- Also known as: Wencke Myhre
- Born: Wenche Synnøve Myhre; 15 February 1947 (age 79); Kjelsås, Norway
- Genres: schlager, revue
- Occupation: singer
- Years active: 1960–present

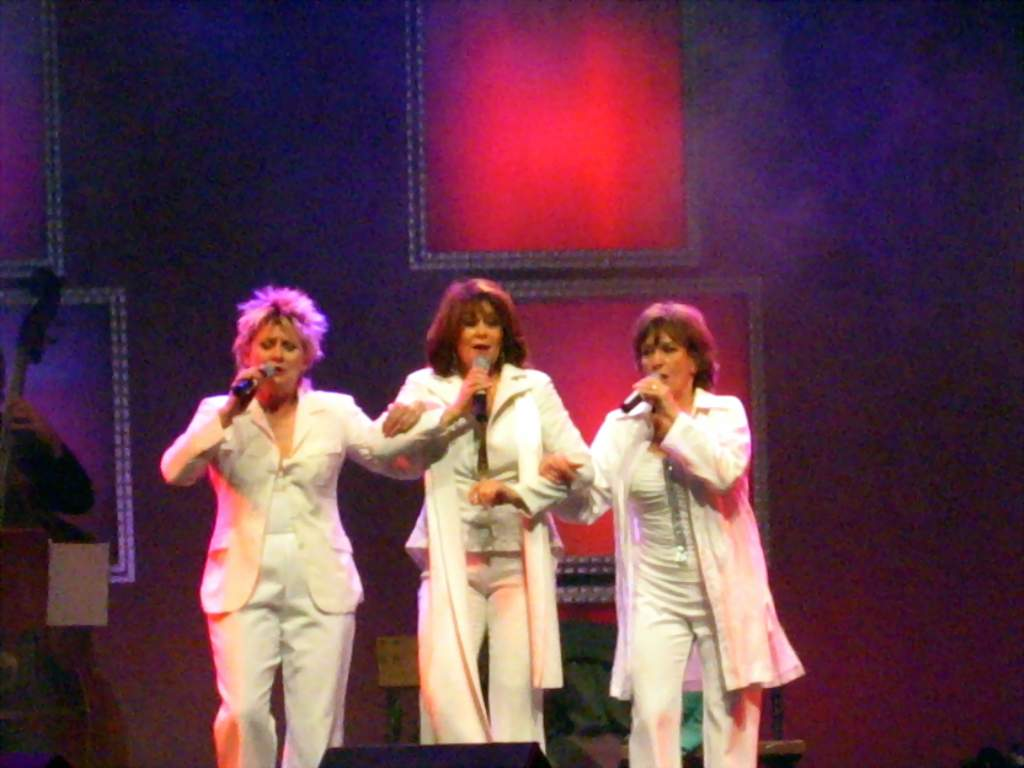
Myhre performing in 2005 in Frankfurt am Main with Gitte Hænning and Siw Malmkvist

Wenche Synnøve Myhre (born 15 February 1947), known in German as Wencke Myhre, is a Norwegian singer who has had a great number of hit songs since the 1960s in the Norwegian, Danish, German and Swedish markets and languages. She represented Germany in the Eurovision Song Contest 1968.

== Early career ==
Myhre was born in Kjelsås, Oslo. She got her first recording contract with composer and producer Arne Bendiksen at the age of 13, after winning a talent contest staged by Verdens Gang newspaper at the Chat Noir theatre in Oslo in 1960. In 1963 she became the first performer to have three songs in the Top 10 at the same time. She got her first film role the same year.

== Eurovision ==
Myhre made her first appearance in the Norwegian heats for the Eurovision Song Contest 1964 with the songs "God gammel firkantet vals," which the juries placed second, and "La meg være ung" which placed third but went on to become a big hit. She was supposed to participate in the Norwegian selection the following year, but pulled out due to health problems. The song "Karussel", which was sung twice by Kirsti Sparboe in her absence, won the selection. She also participated in 1966, again with two songs, "Lørdagstripp," which was placed fourth, and "Vims," which came fifth.

Myhre represented Germany in the Eurovision Song Contest 1968 with the song "Ein Hoch der Liebe" where she placed sixth. It would be another fifteen years before she attempted Eurovision again and did so via the German national heat, singing "Wir beide gegen den Wind" with her son. In the same year (1983) she was one of Jahn Teigen's chorus girls in the Norwegian final. When Teigen won the Norwegian heats, the potential prospect of singing both for Norway and for Germany became too much and she was replaced by Teigen’s girlfriend Anita Skorgan in the international final in Munich.

In 1992, she took third place in the Norwegian selection with "Du skal få din dag i morgen". She participated in the Norwegian selection again for the Eurovision Song Contest 2009 in Moscow, Russia. Wencke performed the song "Alt har en mening nå" in the second semi-final on Saturday 31 January, but was eliminated from the competition.

== Television appearances ==
In 1974, she had the first in a long series of TV shows on the German channel ZDF. The show was called Das ist meine Welt and was a musical journey through many countries with Wenche as guide. Myhre hosted the German qualifying heat for the Eurovision Song Contest 1986, "Ein Lied für Bergen".

In Sweden, she has worked together with Povel Ramel, and has become very popular with a wide audience. She has starred in movies both in Norway and Sweden.

Myhre has been married to Danish dentist Torben Friis-Møller, German movie director Michael Pfleghar and Norwegian investor Arthur Buchardt. She has four children from her two first marriages. She currently (2021) lives with Swedish musician and conductor Anders Eljas in Nesøya in Asker, Norway.

== Major hits in Germany ==
- Hey, kennt Ihr schon meinen Peter (1964)
- Geht ein Boy vorbei (1965)
- Beiß nicht gleich in jeden Apfel (1966) # 6
- Komm allein (1967) # 9
- Ein Hoch der Liebe (1968) No. 18
- Flower Power Kleid (1968) No. 17
- Abendstunde hat Gold im Munde (1969) No. 36
- Er steht im Tor (1969) # 4
- Er hat ein knallrotes Gummiboot (1970) # 21
- Eine Mark für Charlie (1977) # 9
- Lass mein Knie, Joe (1978) # 5
- Wenches jul (1991) # 12
- Für immer und ewig (I'll Love You Forever) (1994)

Preceded by Inge Brück with Anouschka	Germany in the Eurovision Song Contest; 1968	Succeeded by Siw Malmkvist with Primaballerina
Preceded by (Sweden) Pernilla Wahlgren	OGAE Second Chance Contest winner 1992	Succeeded by (Norway) Merethe Trøan
