= Strawberry (hotel company) =

Hospitality companies of Norway

- Type: Private
- Industry: Hospitality
- Founded: 1990
- Headquarters: Oslo, Norway
- Area served: Scandinavia, Finland and the Baltic
- Key people: Petter Stordalen, Owner and President; Torgeir Silseth, CEO
- Products: Hotels
- Operating income: 25,700,000,000 Norwegian krone (2025)
- Number of employees: >20,000
- Divisions: Comfort Hotel; Quality Hotel; Clarion Hotel; Home Hotel; Nordic Hotels & Resorts
- Website: strawberryhotels.com

Strawberry (formerly known as Nordic Choice Hotels) is one of the largest hotel companies in Scandinavia with over 250 hotels in the Nordics and the Baltics and over 20,000 employees. It is a franchisee of Choice Hotels International. The franchise agreement gives the company the right to use three brands and their umbrella brands. Apart from that, Strawberry is in most aspects run independently from Choice International. Strawberry also runs more than 120 restaurants, 20 spas and a number of gyms, conference halls and arenas.

== History ==
Strawberry Hotels was established in Norway in 1990 as Choice Hotels Scandinavia. It was later renamed Nordic Choice Hotels. During 1994 the company signed a franchise agreement with Choice Hotels International that gave them the right to market its hotels as Comfort, Clarion and Quality hotels. The company was listed at the Oslo stock exchange in 1997, but was lifted in 2005 when Home Invest (owned by business man Petter Stordalen) bought 100% of the stock.

In 2018, Petter Stordalen transferred ownership of the company to his three children – Emilie, Jacob and Henrik Stordalen. In 2006 Torgeir Silseth became CEO for the Nordic Choice Hotels Group and continues to be the CEO in 2024.

In 2021, the chain was hit with a Conti (ransomware) attack and hackers demanded $5 million in ransom. After the attack, the chain adopted ChromeOS on its computers company-wide. Hackers had previously leaked sensitive customer and employee data on the dark web.

On 22 May 2023, Nordic Choice Hotels is renamed Strawberry.

In January 2024, the company signed a sponsoring agreement for Nationalarenan, a multi-purpose stadium in Stockholm, which was renamed Strawberry Arena.

== Brands ==
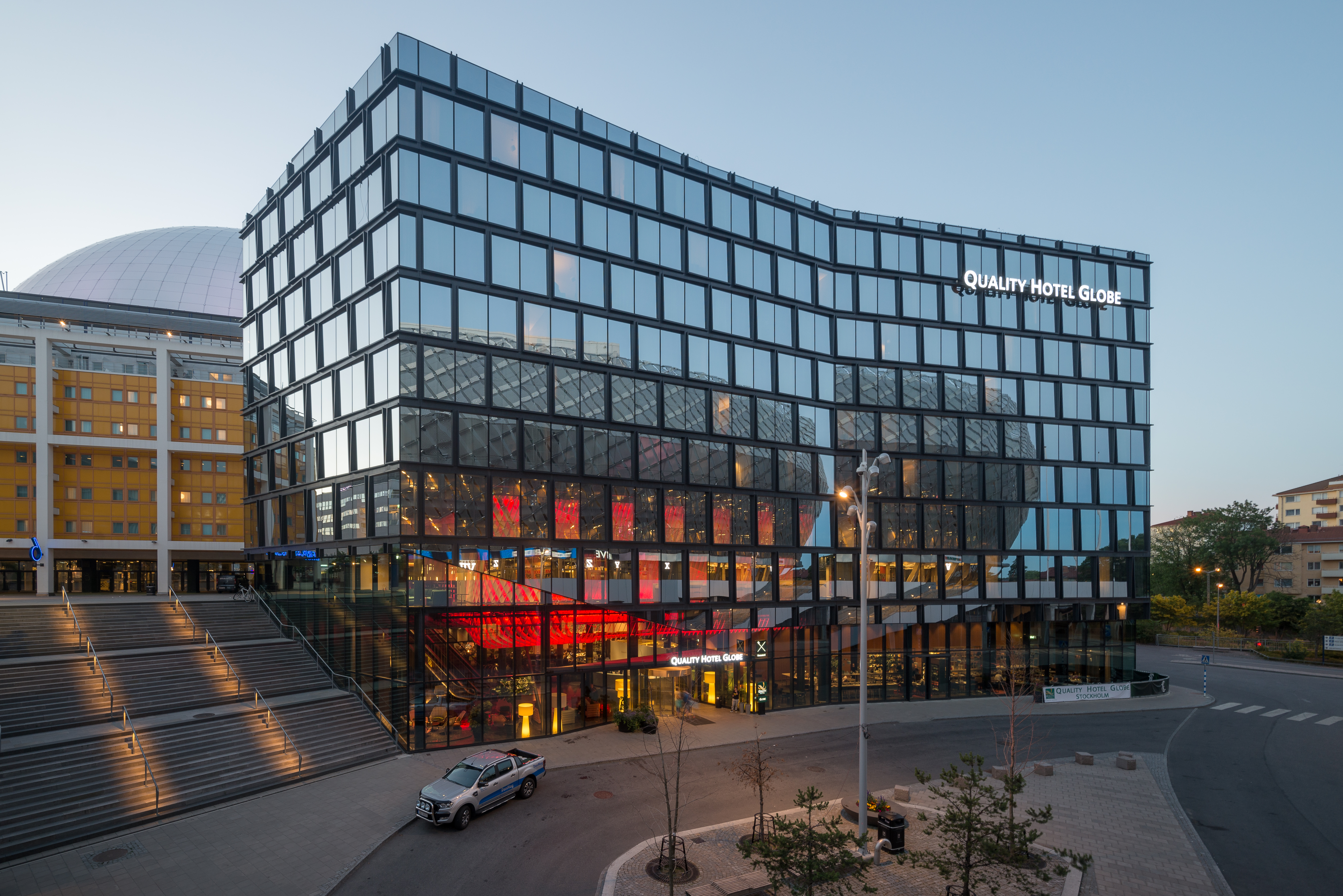
Quality Hotel Globe in Stockholm

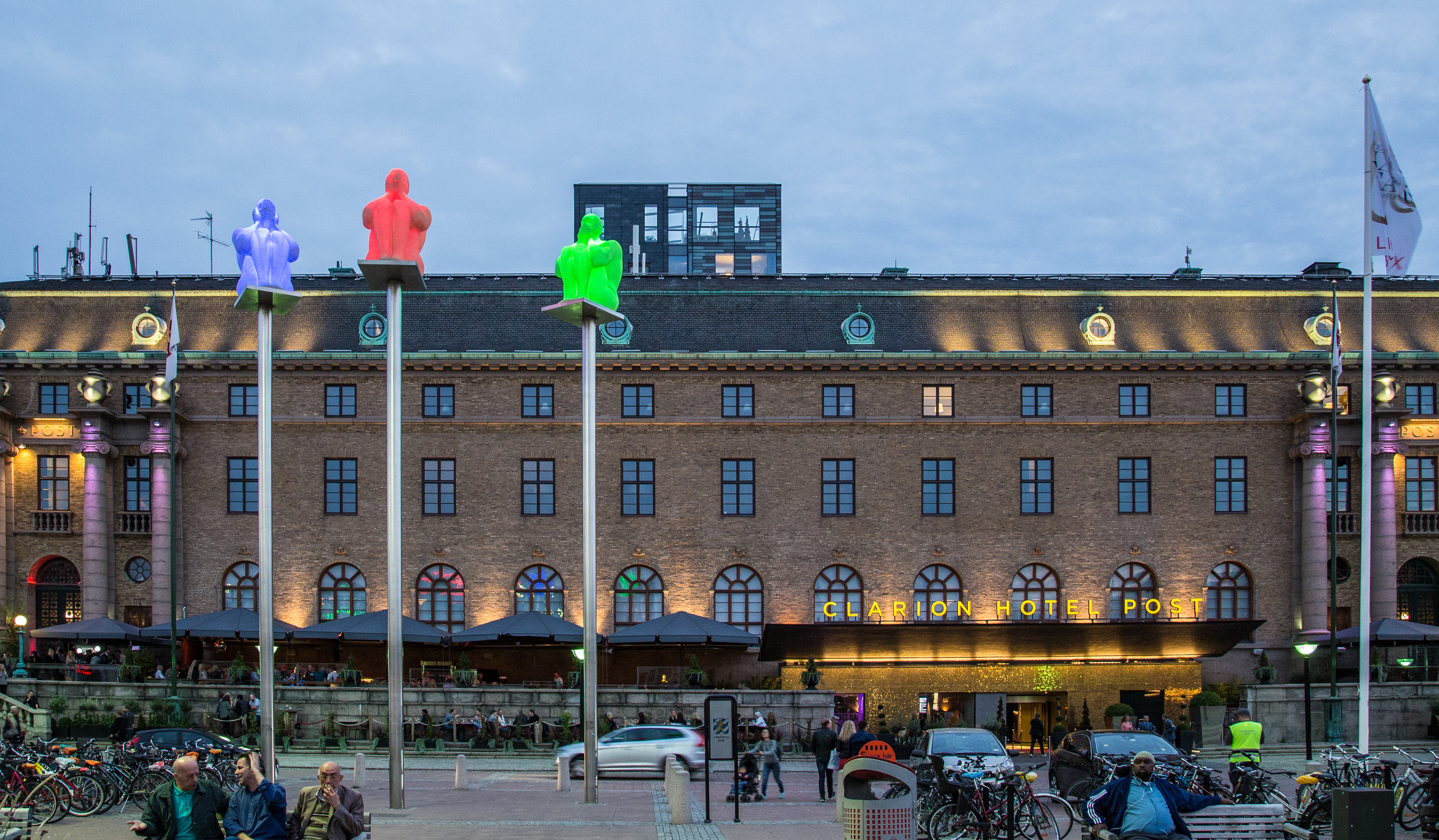
Clarion Hotel Post in Gothenburg

The hotels are marketed under four brands and one independent group. As of September 2026, Strawberry operated and distributed overall 257 hotels located throughout Sweden, Norway, Finland, Denmark, Faroe Islands and Lithuania.

- Clarion Hotel
- Home Hotel
- Quality Hotel
- Comfort Hotel
- StopOver
- Nordic Hotels & Resorts, often under Ascend Hotel Collection branding, with all operating under an additional independent name
