= Clarion Hotel Post =

Building in Gothenburg, Sweden

Coordinates: 57°42′29″N 11°58′28″E

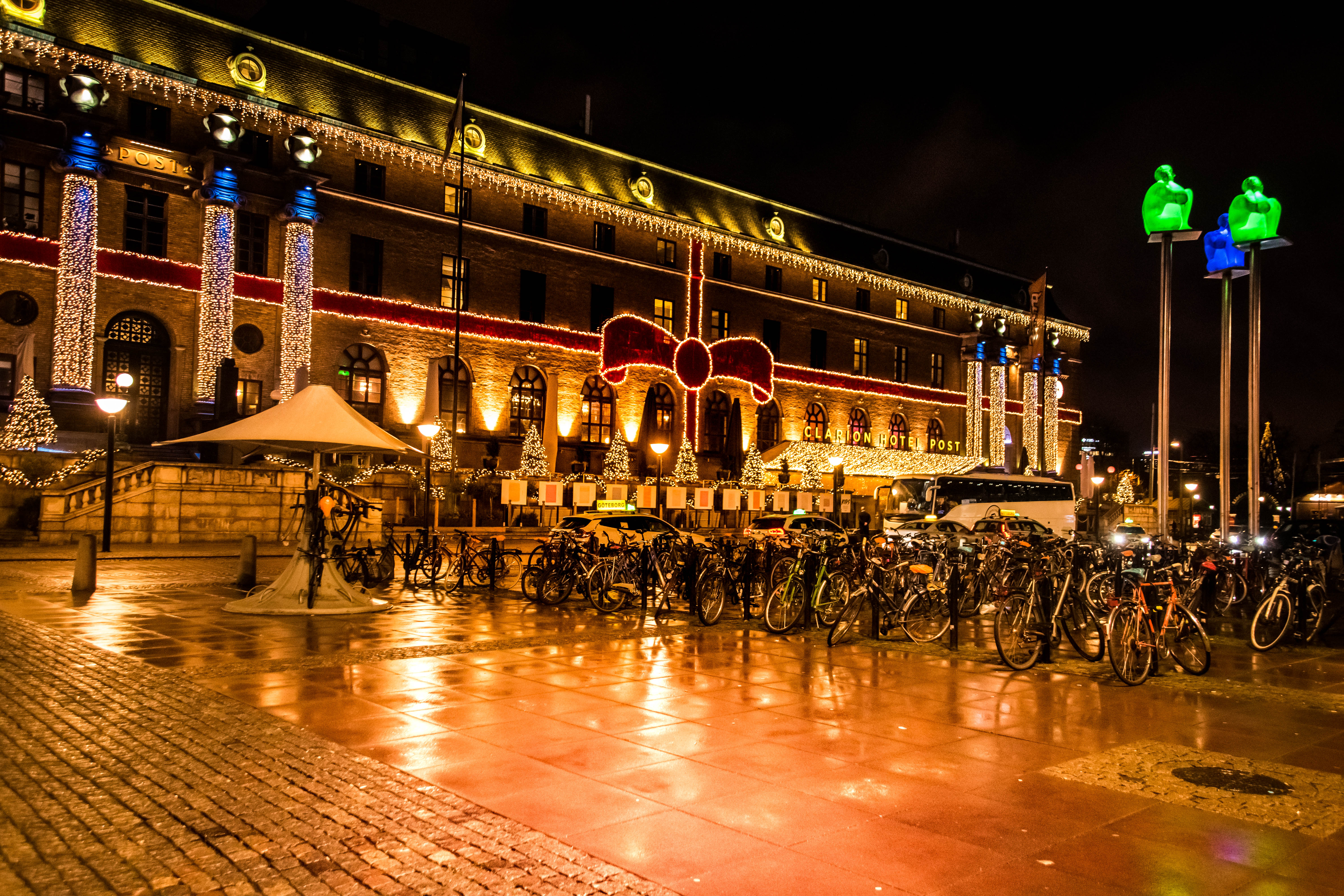
The Clarion Hotel Post during Christmas

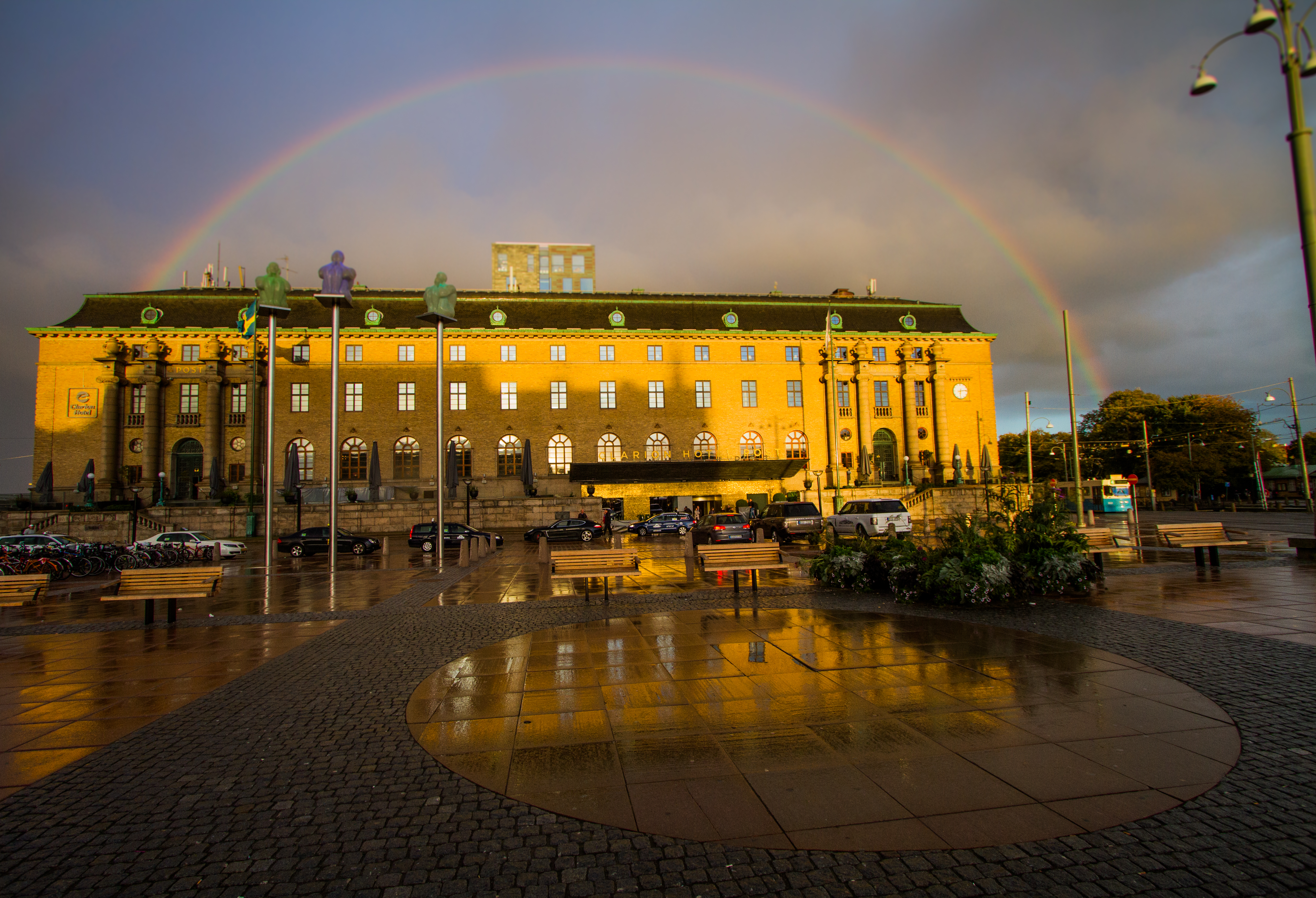
The Clarion Hotel Post at Drottningtorget, Gothenburg (2012)

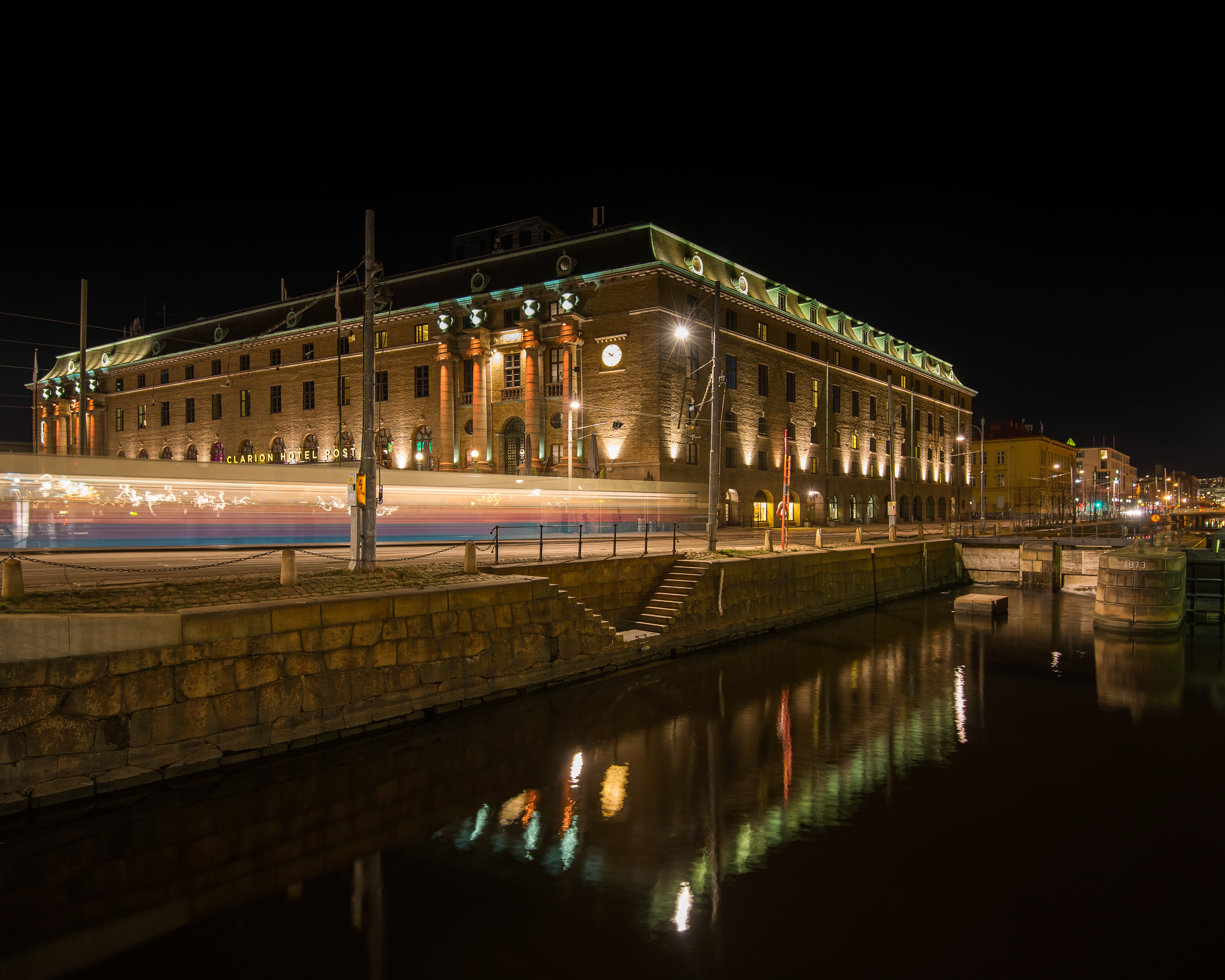
Clarion Hotel Post (2015)

The Clarion Hotel Post is a hotel and conference facility at Drottningtorget in central Gothenburg, Sweden. Designed by Semrén & Månsson, the hotel was built in the former Posthuset (post office building) of Gothenburg, with the addition of a modern tower. It opened on 26 January 2012.

The hotel is owned by the Swedish firm Home Properties, which is controlled by the Norwegian billionaire Petter Stordalen. It is operated by Nordic Choice Hotels (which is also owned by Stordalen) under the trademark Clarion Hotels.

The hotel's main entrance is from Drottningtorget and the rear entrance is from Åkareplatsen. Clarion Hotel Post has 500 rooms including three suites, a large event room that can accommodate 1,000 people and 17 meeting rooms. There are three restaurants and bars, bistro, bar and grill and a rooftop pool with good views of the city. With a total area of 36,700 square meters the conversion and extension cost a total of 1.4 billion Swedish kronor.

== History of Posthuset ==
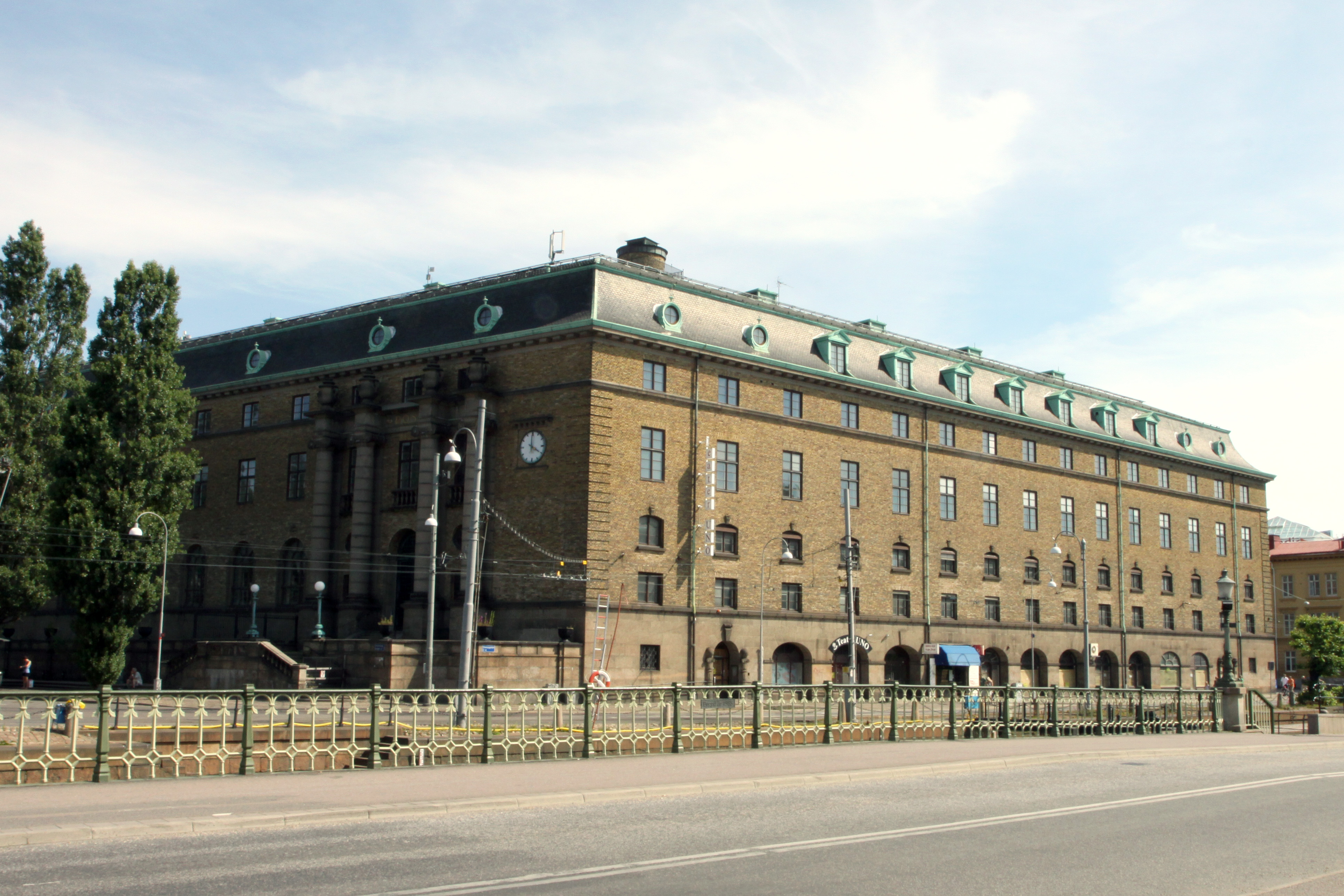
The former postal administration prior to the extensive construction work (2009)

Posthuset was designed by Ernst Torulf and was completed in May 1925.

In 1995 it was registered as a listed building, meaning that the facade and certain prominent features, for example kassahallen (the cash hall) could not be altered.

On March 7, 2020, as a response to falling demand due to the coronavirus pandemic, Clarion Hotel Post chose to let 25 of its 200 employees go.
