= Ljan Station =

Railway station in Oslo, Norway

Ljan stasjon
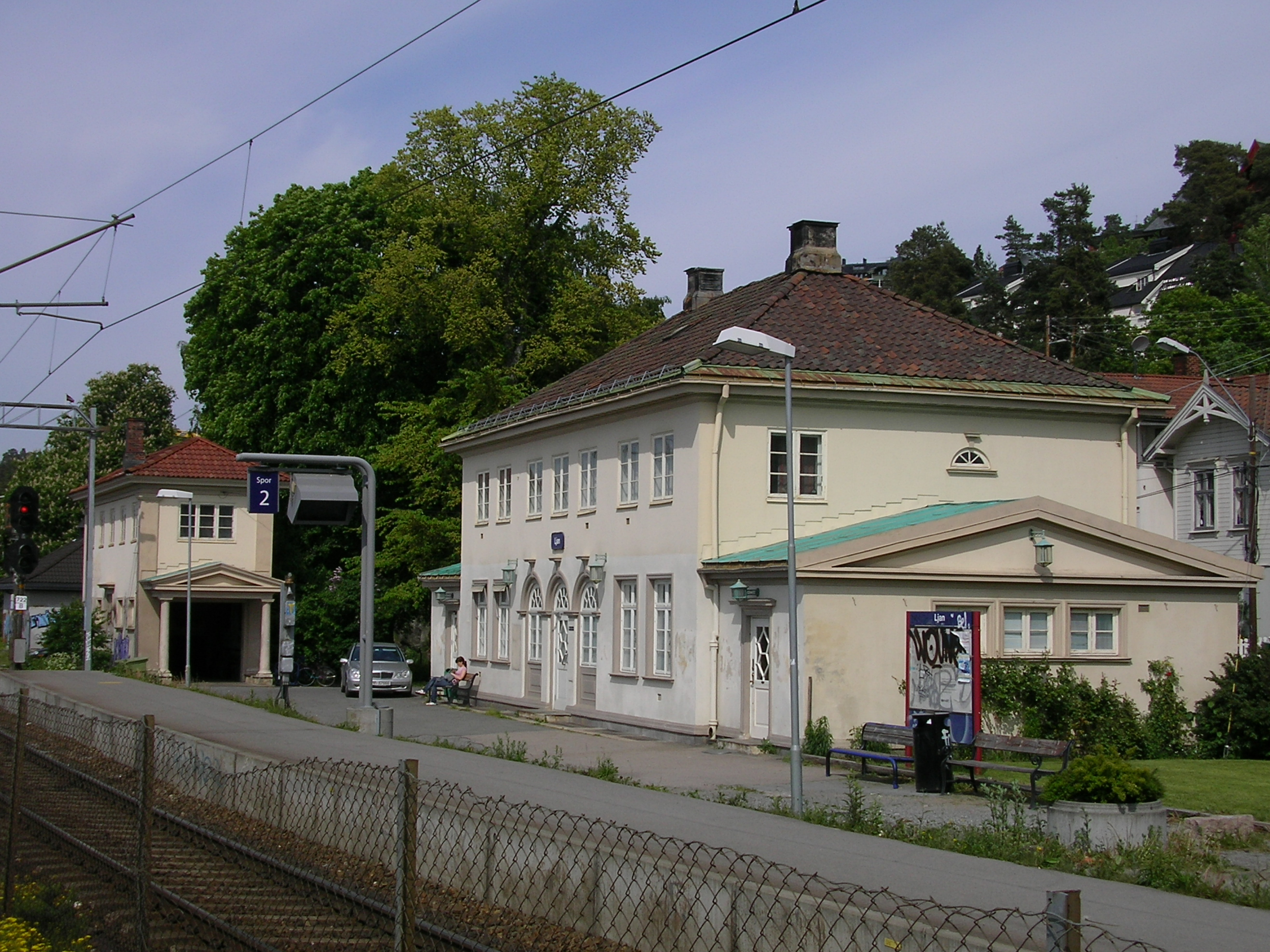

General information
- Location: Ljan, Oslo; Norway
- Coordinates: 59°51′11″N 10°47′06″E
- Elevation: 50.8 m (167 ft) AMSL
- Owner: Bane NOR
- Operator: Vy
- Line: Østfold Line
- Distance: 7.15 km (4.44 mi) from Oslo S
- Platforms: 2 side platforms
- Tracks: 2

Construction
- Parking: Yes
- Cycle facilities: Yes
- Architect: Peter Andreas Blix (1879); Gerhard Fischer (1923)

Other information
- Fare zone: 1

History
- Opened: 2 January 1879
- Rebuilt: 1923
Location
- Location within Akershus

Ljan Station (Norwegian: Ljan stasjon) is a railway station on the Østfold Line. It is located in the Ljan neighborhood in the Nordstrand borough of Oslo, Norway. Situated 7.15 kilometers (4.44 mi) from Oslo Central Station (Oslo S), it features two side platforms. Hauketo is served by the Line L2 of the Oslo Commuter Rail, providing two services each hour.

The station was one of the original stations on the Østfold Line, and opened on 2 January 1879. The original station was designed by Peter Andreas Blix. Commuter trains started running to Ljan in 1883, and had for many years the station as their terminus. The line through Ljan was moved during the 1920 and converted to double track. Ljan Station received a new station building in 1923, designed in Neoclassic by Gerhard Fischer, including an underpass with entrances. The station is listed as a cultural heritage site.

== History ==
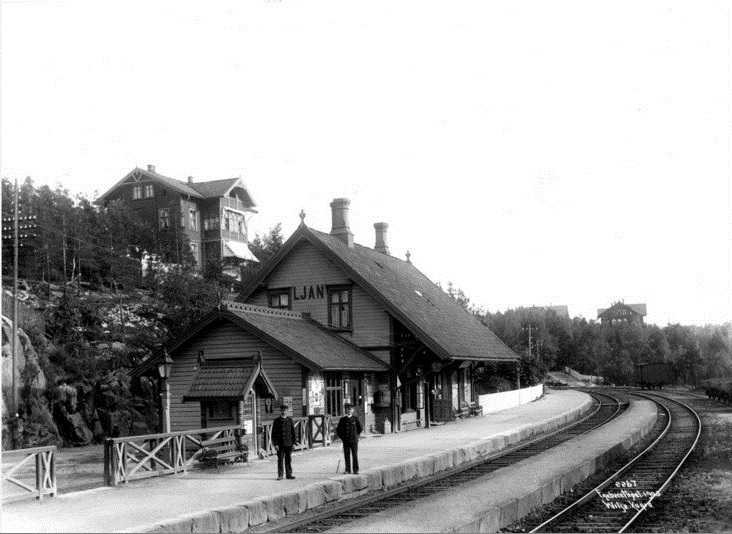
Peter Andreas Blix' original station building as it stood in 1903

The station opened as Lian on 2 January 1879, the same day as the rest of the Østfold Line. It originally received a station building designed by Peter Andreas Blix. NSB started operating commuter trains from Christiania East Station to Ljan in 1883. This made Ljan an attractive place for people to build houses, as it was then possible to commute to the city. Residential development therefore started after the commuter train services were introduced. From 1885 this train was operated with a Class 13 locomotive. It proved to be underpowered, so a larger locomotive was taken into use instead. As there was no turntable at Lian, the locomotive was forced to back on the return to Christiania.

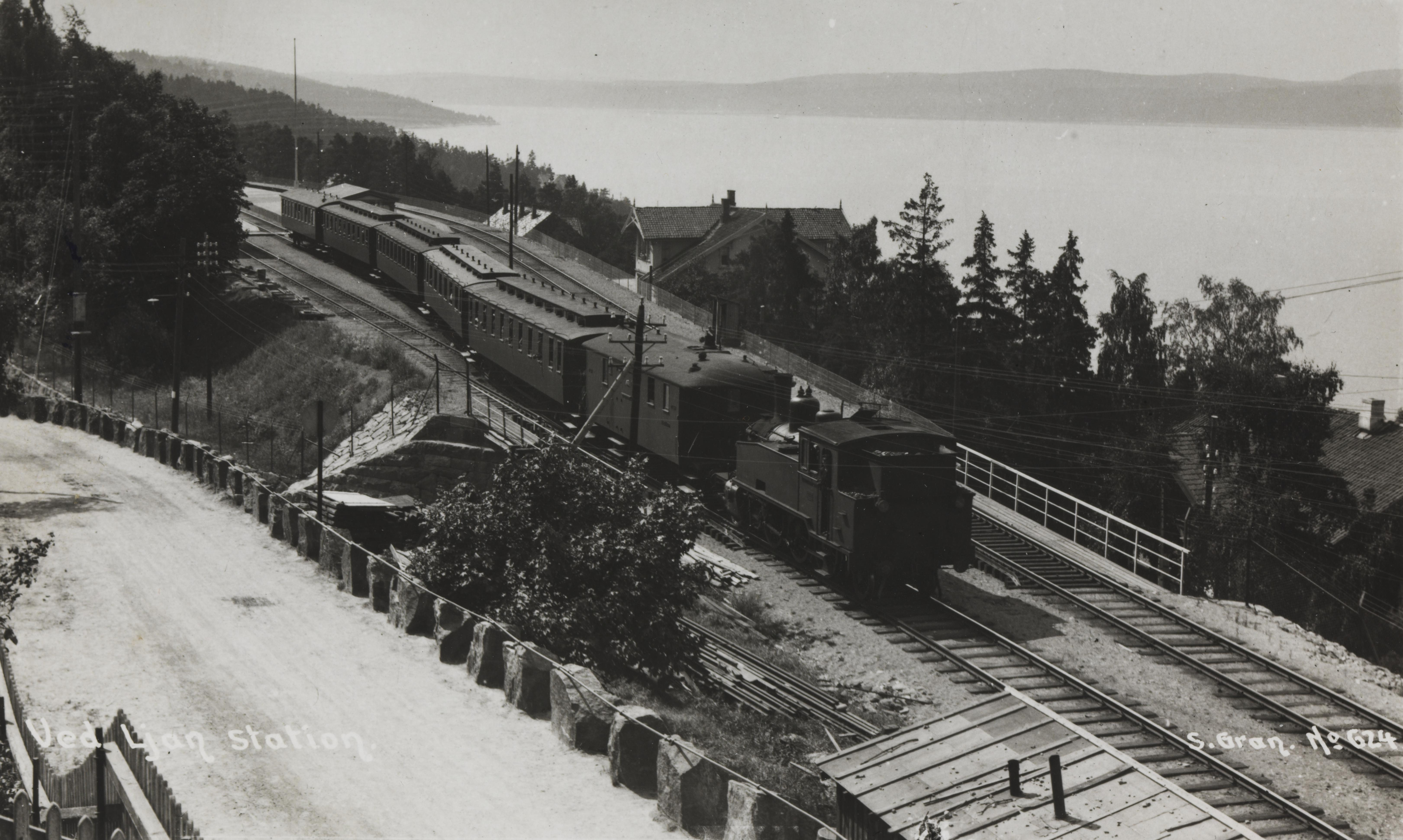
A commuter train departing the station

The station developed as the center of the community at Ljan. It was located close to the general store, while the post office was operated as part of the railway station. There was a newspaper kiosk at the station. A small garden was kept by the railway company at the southern end of the station. This was frequently used as a playground. Initially there were four daily trains per direction per day, with a twenty-minute travel time to Oslo. Throughout the 1890s the population increased, leading to a steady increase in the number of commuter trains to Lian. By 1893 there were 17 trains per direction per day. By 1894 the population at Ljan had reached 430.

In addition to passenger transport, wood from Enebakk was carried overland to Ljan and then freighted by rail to the city. Next door was a coaching inn which had a restaurant. The train station's spelling was changed from Lian to Ljan in April 1894. From 1895 some of the trains were extended to Kullebunden (later renamed Kolbotn Station). Ljan was one of the first Norwegian stations to receive an interlocking system, on 1 January 1901. This was a limited system which was not fail proof, so the operation had to manually control that they did not place the switches in a conflicting manner.

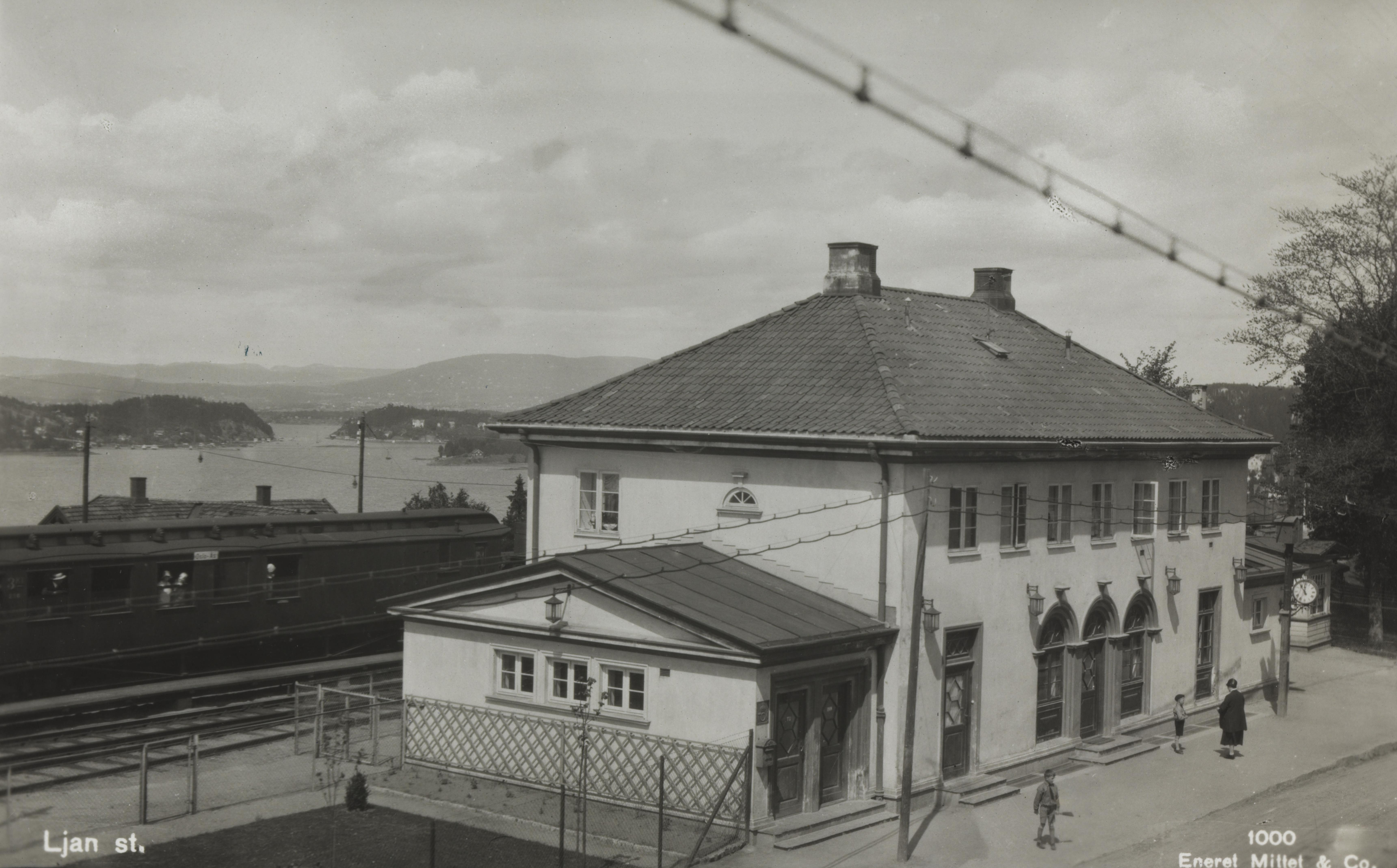
Gerhard Fischer's station building with the Oslofjord

Work on a new route between Ljan and Holm started in 1917. It involved demolishing the Ljan Viaduct south of the station and rerouting the line via a new Hauketo Station. The realignment of the route made it necessary to build a new station at Ljan. At the same time the route past the station was rebuilt to double track. Just south of Ljan Station the 80-meter (260 ft) Sole Tunnel was built—the first double-track tunnel in Norway. The original station building was replaced with a new station building designed by Gerhard Fischer at NSB Arkitektkontor. The old station was bought as a private residence and moved to Herregårdsveien 6B. A complete interlocking system became operational on 12 May 1926.

Electrification of the Østfold Line started in the 1930s, and the section from Oslo to Ljan was completed on 9 December 1936 and from Ljan to Kolbotn on 18 January 1937. The station became unstaffed in 1988. Operation of the station building was taken over by Ljan Vel, a residents' association. A café was opened in the station building in 1996. The Norwegian National Rail Administration upgraded the information system in 2010, including new speakers, information boards with real-time information.

== Facilities ==
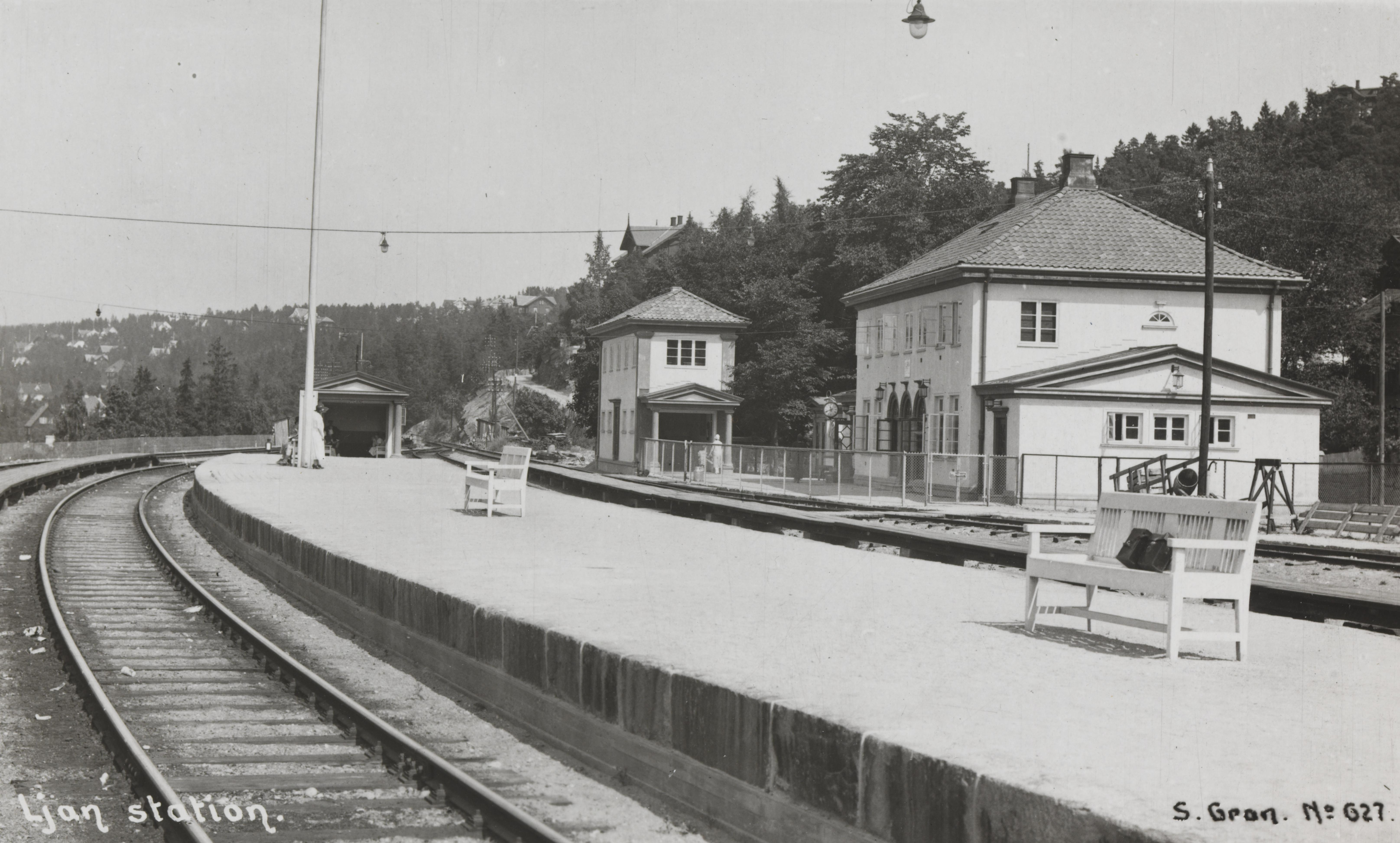
The station still largely has the same layout and structures as in 1923

Ljan Station is situated 7.15 kilometers (4.44 mi) from Oslo Central Station, at an elevation of 51 meters (167 ft) above mean sea level. The Østfold Line past Ljan is double track and electrified, with the station partially located in a curve. The station has two side platforms. Track 1, closest to the station, has a 180-meter (590 ft) platform, while Track 2's is 218 metres (715 ft). They are 65 and 57 centimeters (26 and 22 in) tall, respectively. There is an underpass under the tracks, with original Neoclassical entrances. There is bicycle and car parking, but no ticket vending machine.

The two-story, brick station building was designed by Gerhard Fischer. As it was a single order, the station has a Neoclassical design which does not have any similar buildings elsewhere on the railway network, in part due to the short-lived popularity of the style in Norway. The station is listed as a cultural heritage. Prior to receiving the project, Fischer had recently been in Italy and brought home inspiration from there. The station's two-story part is rectangular and almost symmetrical. The single-story annexes on both sides break with the symmetry. In its original layout the ground floor featured a waiting room, ticket office, post office and a cargo facility. The upper story was originally a station master's residence. The station building measures 210 square meters (2,300 sq ft).

On the road side of the station there is a preserved Neoclassical brick superstructure which covers the stairs down to the underpass. There is a smaller superstructure on the other platform. The upper floor of the former housed the signaling control until the installation of centralized traffic control. Both of these structures are also preserved. There is also a disused wooden cargo building at the station.

== Service ==
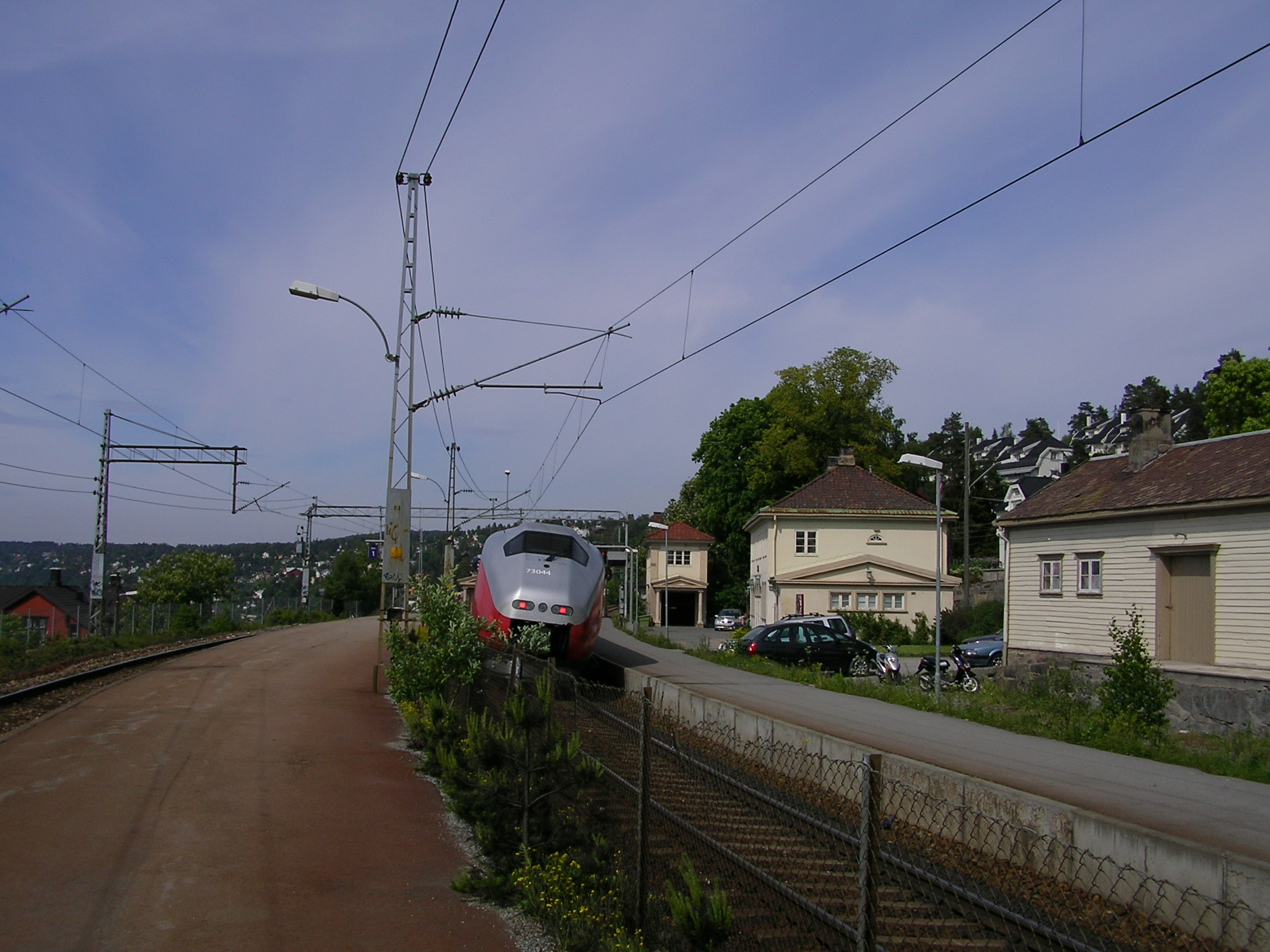
NSB Class 73 train passing through the station in 2006. Only commuter trains call at Ljan.

The station is served by line L2 of the Oslo Commuter Rail, operated by Vy. During regular hours this involves two trains per hour per direction which run from Ski Station via the Østfold Line to Oslo Central Station and onward to Skøyen Station. Ljan is not served by the L2x express services. Travel time is 8 minutes to Oslo S and 26 minutes to Ski.

Despite the double track, the Østfold Line past Ljan has reached its capacity limitation due to the mix of commuter, regional and freight trains. The Follo Line is scheduled for completion in 2021. It will allow regional trains to bypass the Østfold Line between Oslo and Ski, freeing up capacity. This will allow the L2 service to increase to at least four hourly services from the early 2020s.

== Bibliography ==
- Bjerke, Thor; Holom, Finn (2004). Banedata 2004 (in Norwegian). Hamar / Oslo: Norwegian Railway Museum / Norwegian Railway Club. ISBN 82-90286-28-7.
- Hartmann, Eivind; Mangset, Øistein; Reisegg, Øyvind (1997). Neste stasjon (in Norwegian). Gyldendal. ISBN 82-05-25294-7.
- Henriksen, Lise; Schulerud, Mentz (1990). Fint folk i bratte bakker – Ljans historie (in Norwegian). Oslo: Selskapet til Ljans vel. ISBN 82-992272-0-8.
- Langård, Geir-Widar; Ruud, Leif-Harald (2005). Sydbaneracer og Skandiapil – Glimt fra Østfoldbanen gjennom 125 år (in Norwegian). Oslo: Norwegian Railway Club. ISBN 978-82-90286-29-8.
- NSB Arkitektkontor (1992). NSBs bygningsregistrering – Oslo distrikt: Østfoldbanen, vestre linje Nordstrand–(Moss) (in Norwegian). Oslo.

Preceding station			Following station
Nordstrand	Østfold Line		Hauketo
Preceding station	Local trains		Following station
Nordstrand	L2	Stabekk–Oslo S–Ski	Hauketo
