= Malmøykalven =

Norwegian island

Coordinates: 59.8644°N 10.7439°E

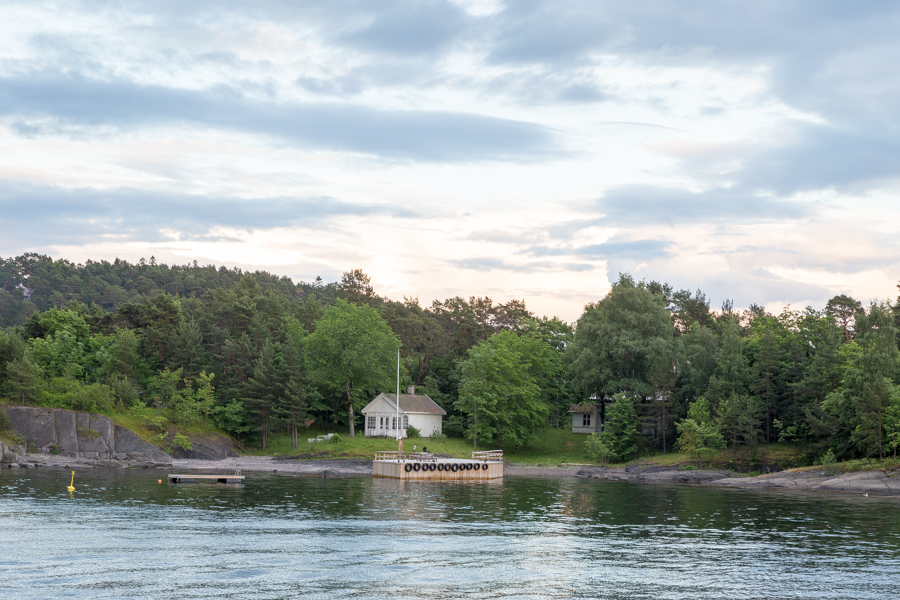
Ferry terminal at Malmøykalven

Malmøykalven is an island in the Oslofjord in Oslo, Norway. It has an area of 98,000 m^{2}, and is located west of the island of Malmøya, separated from Malmøya by a narrow strait. Malmøykalven is included in the Malmøya og Malmøykalven Nature Reserve, which was established in 2008.

== History ==
Malmøykalven was bought by the municipality of Oslo in 1915, and the site was used for a hospital for children with scrofula.
