= Nordstrand Station =

Railway station in Oslo, Norway

Nordstrand
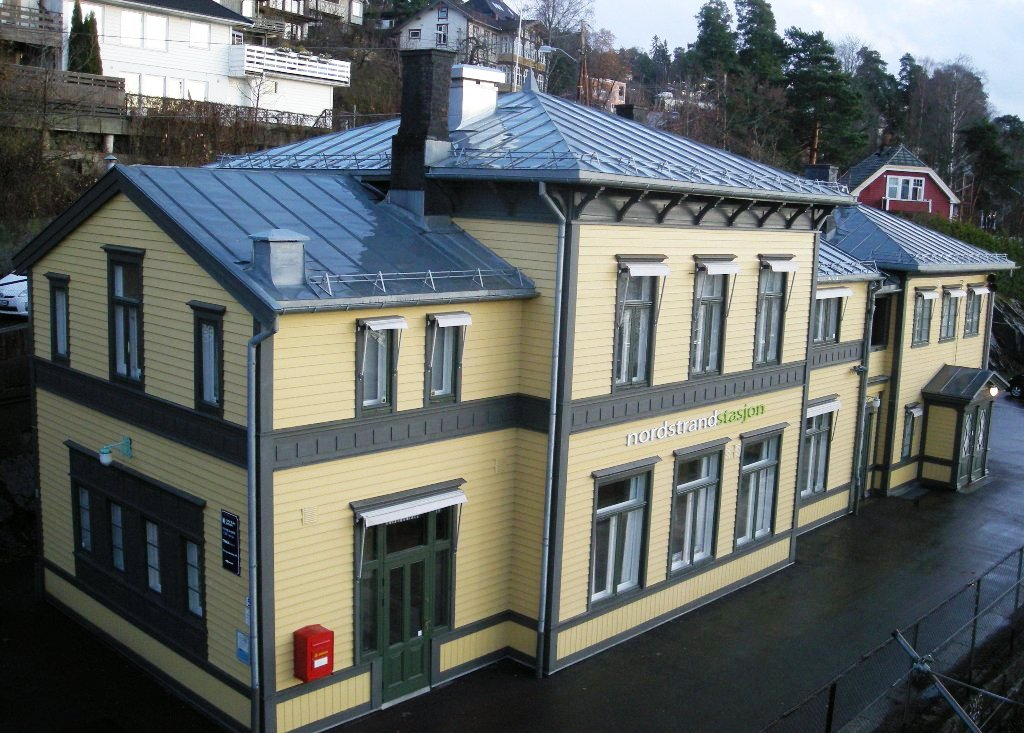

General information
- Location: Nordstrand, Oslo; Norway
- Coordinates: 59°51′49″N 10°47′09″E
- Elevation: 40 m (130 ft)
- Owner: Bane NOR
- Operator: Vy
- Line: Østfold Line
- Distance: 5.95 km (3.70 mi)
- Tracks: 2

Construction
- Architect: Paul Due

Other information
- Fare zone: 1

History
- Opened: 31 May 1880
- Electrified: 9 December 1936
Location
- Location within Akershus

Nordstrand Station (Norwegian: Nordstrand stasjon) is a railway station on the Østfold Line. It is located in the Nordstrand borough of Oslo, Norway. Situated 5.95 kilometers (3.70 mi) from Oslo Central Station (Oslo S), it features an island platform. Nordstrand is served by the Line L2 of the Oslo Commuter Rail, providing two services each hour.

The station opened on 31 May 1880, a year after the Østfold Line. The station allowed the area to be opened up for residences and commuting. As traffic grew, a station building was erected around 1895. The station and line past the station were upgraded during the 1920. The station has been unstaffed since 1970. It was the site of the Nordstrand Accident on 3 October 1993.

== History ==
Nordstrand did not receive a railway station when the Østfold Line opened on 2 January 1879. Instead passengers had to walk to Bekkelaget Station or Ljan Station. Later that year a commuter rail service started to Bekkelaget, and was extended to Ljan in 1880. In conjunction with this a simple halt was established at Nordstrand. An innovation in Norway, it consisted a single platform which allowed passengers to embark and disembark. The station opened on 31 May 1880. A more extensive commuter rail program was introduced in 1883. The station was upgraded and staffed from 1884.

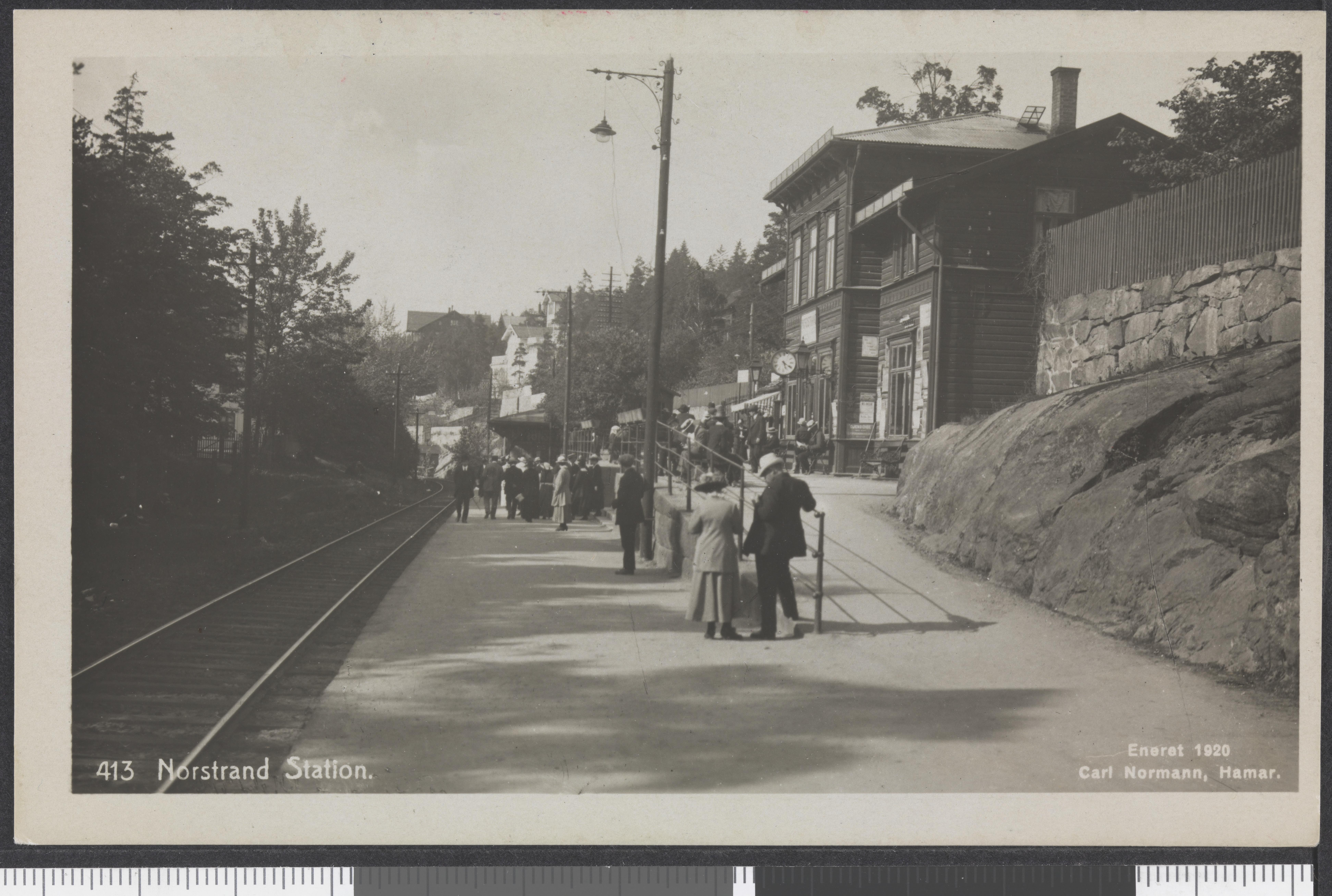
The station during the single track era

The arrival of the railway placed Nordstrand comfortably within commuting distance of the capital. It therefore became a popular site to build houses. Several of the farms in the area sold off otherwise unproductive lots with good views and a short walk to the station. Much of the sales were carried out by speculators who bought farmland and sold them onward to settlers. Throughout the 1890s the population increased, leading to a steady increase in the number of commuter trains to Lian. They originally used 14 minutes to Christiania East Station. A post office was opened at the station in 1891.

The station building was designed by Paul Due and was completed around 1895. During the single-track era the railway did not divide the area in two in the same way as it did later. Passengers could board or disembark on both sides of the train. There were no level crossings, although there was an underpass south of the station. As part of an effort to increase the capacity on the commuter section, the line past Nordstrand was converted to double track from 1 June 1924. Ahead of this the main station building was expanded with an annex which featured a post office. An interlocking system became operational from 20 January 1927. This was followed up by electrification on 9 December 1936.

The station became unstaffed from 1970. The station building was subsequently rebuilt and converted into apartments. The station exterior was clad in fiber cement in the hopes of eliminating maintenance. NSB considered closing the station in 1987 to speed up train times for travelers from further south, but the proposal never materialized. The station was largely left to decay and by the early 1990s was in poor condition. NSB then removed the fiber cement and renovated the building.

The Nordstrand Accident took place on 3 October 1993. An uncontrolled NS Class 6400 shunter crashed into an NSB Class 69 commuter train which was standing still at the station. Five people died in the collision.

== Facilities ==
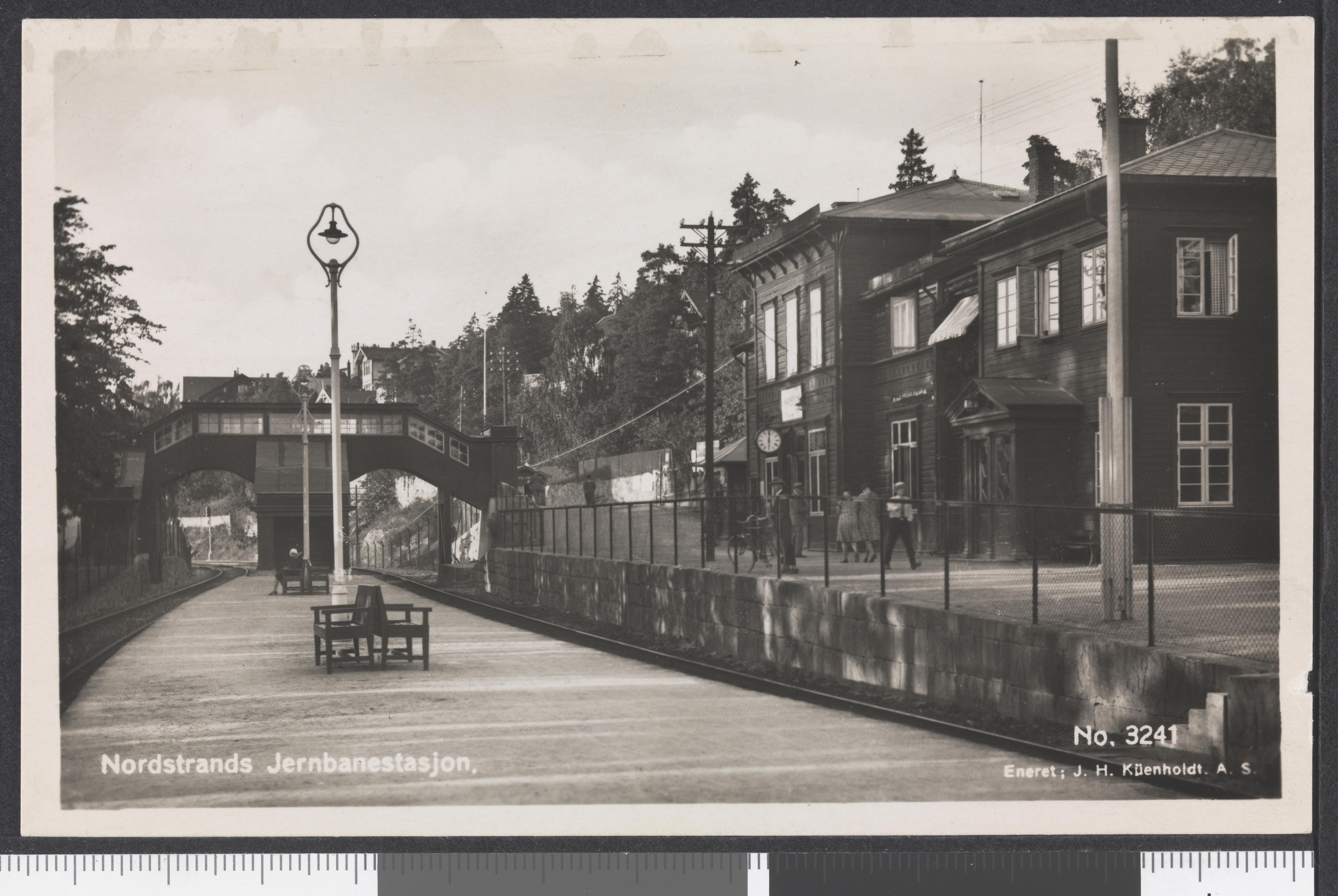
The station after the arrival of double track in the 1920s

Nordstrand Station is situated 5.95 kilometers (3.70 mi) from Oslo Central Station, at an elevation of 40 meters (130 ft) above mean sea level. The Østfold Line past Nordstrand is double track and electrified. The station has an island platform, accessed from an overpass on the north side. It is 153 meters (502 ft) long and 43 centimeters (17 in) tall. There is limited car parking. Platforms are only accessible via stairs.

The two-story, wooden station building was designed by Paul Due in a moderate Neoclassic style. In addition to the original 169 square meters (1,820 sq ft) station building, there was a cargo building, a wood shed and a covered overpass to the platform.

== Service ==
The station is served by line L2 of the Oslo Commuter Rail, operated by Vy. During regular hours this involves two trains per hour per direction which run from Ski Station via the Østfold Line to Oslo Central Station and onward to Skøyen Station. Nordstrand is not served by the L2x express services. Travel time is 6 minutes to Oslo S and 28 minutes to Ski.

Despite the double track, the Østfold Line past Ljan has reached its capacity limitation due to the mix of commuter, regional and freight trains. The Follo Line is scheduled for completion in 2021. It will allow regional trains to bypass the Østfold Line between Oslo and Ski, freeing up capacity. This will allow the L2 service to increase to at least four hourly services from the early 2020s.

== Bibliography ==
- Bjerke, Thor; Holom, Finn (2004). Banedata 2004 (in Norwegian). Hamar / Oslo: Norwegian Railway Museum / Norwegian Railway Club. ISBN 82-90286-28-7.
- Johannessen, Finn Erhard (2000). Utsikt over Nordstrands historie (in Norwegian). Oslo: Nordstrand Vel. ISBN 82-7847-061-8.
- Langård, Geir-Widar; Ruud, Leif-Harald (2005). Sydbaneracer og Skandiapil – Glimt fra Østfoldbanen gjennom 125 år (in Norwegian). Oslo: Norwegian Railway Club. ISBN 978-82-90286-29-8.
- NSB Arkitektkontor (1992). NSBs bygningsregistrering – Oslo distrikt: Østfoldbanen, vestre linje Nordstrand–(Moss) (in Norwegian). Oslo.

Preceding station			Following station
Oslo S Bekkelaget	Østfold Line		Ljan
Preceding station	Local trains		Following station
Oslo S	L2	Stabekk–Oslo S–Ski	Ljan
