= Malmøya =

Norwegian island

Coordinates: 59°52′N 10°45′E

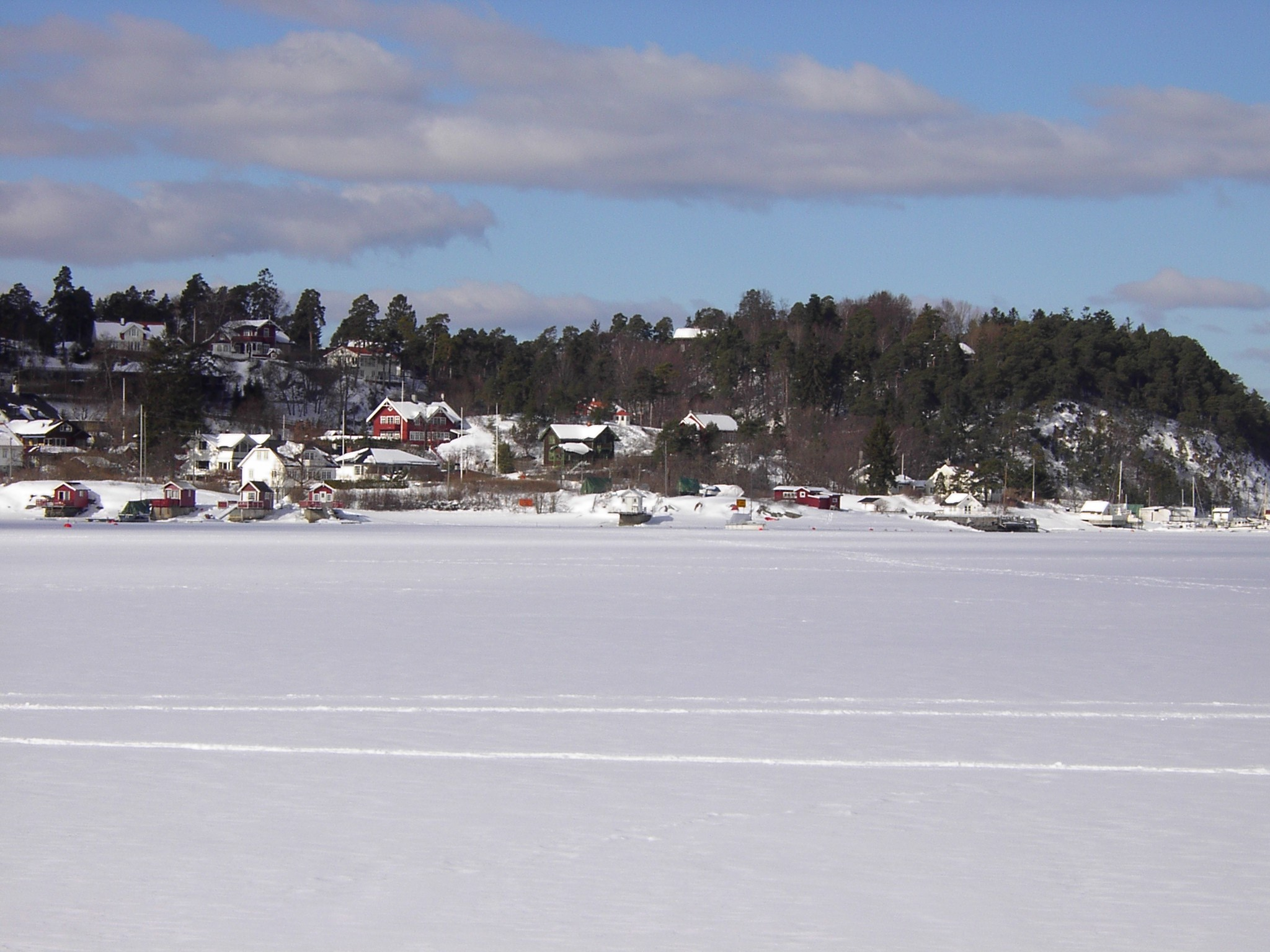
Winter picture from East side of Malmøya, showing the old steamship pier.

Malmøya is an island 4 kilometres (2.5 mi) south of Oslo Central Station, Norway. The island is mostly known for its large quantities of fossils from the Cambro-Silurian period and its rare flowers. The name Malmøya is derived from 'malm', or 'ore', due to the extensive amount found on the island.

== History ==
The labour movement had an education center at Malmøya, where the current kindergarten is located. The center was used from the mid 30s to the 50s, however, due to German occupation during the war the center lost its influence.

== Facilities ==
For its relatively small area the island has quite a few different facilities. There is one bus that arrives once an hour (twice during rush hours) that stops in the center of the city of Oslo.

The Island also has a small shop that is open every day. There is a communal beach on the west side of the island, as well as a restaurant/shop that is open during the summers, and a camping site, mainly reserved for handicaps.

The Island also houses a sailing and a rowing club.

== Nature and perseverance ==
Parts of Malmøya are included in the Malmøya og Malmøykalven Nature Reserve, along with the neighbour island Malmøykalven.
