= Buzhardt =

Buzhardt is a surname. Notable people with the surname include:

- J. Fred Buzhardt (1924–1978), American attorney and public servant
- John Buzhardt (1936–2008), American baseball player
