= Arthur Buchardt =

Norwegian investor (born 1948)

- Born: 15 June 1948 (age 77); Drammen
- Education: Norwegian School of Management
- Occupation: Businessman

Arthur Buchardt (born 15 June 1948), is a Norwegian investor who mainly invests in hotel projects.

In 1948, Buchardt was born in Drammen, however he spent the majority of his childhood and was raised in Nesodden and in Brumunddal. He went to school at the Norwegian School of Management and eventually graduated. Buchardt has been married twice, one of his marriages was to Wenche Myhre; it lasted four years. Starting in 1989, Buchardt's contributions to the hotel real estate industry was mainly limited to design and investment. In 1994, Buchardt had finished a hotel in Lillehammer that proved to be immensely necessary for the lodging needs of the Olympic tourists. He now owns a real estate investment company with his son, Anders Buchardt, called AB Invest.

Buchardt was married to Wenche Myhre in 1996, but they got separated in 1999.
