= Bekkelaget =

Neighborhood in Oslo, Norway

Coordinates: 59°52′59″N 10°46′16″E

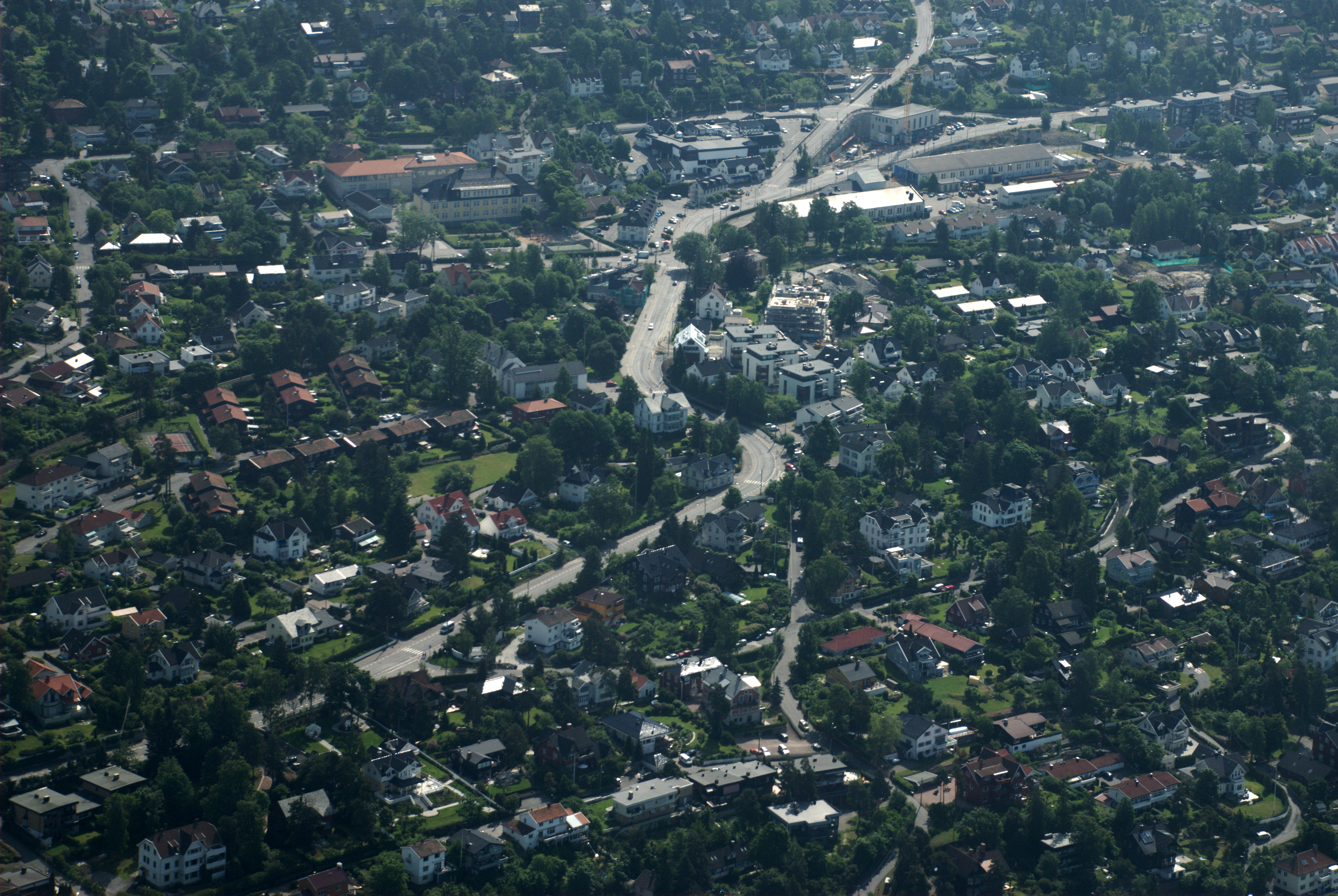
Aerial of Bekkelaget, Oslo (ca. 2010)

Bekkelaget is a neighborhood in the borough Nordstrand in Oslo, Norway.

Originally, Bekkelaget was the maritime area south of Oslo city, in Aker municipality adjacent to the Bunnefjorden. With the opening of the Østfold Line, Bekkelaget station was opened, and the elevated area between Ekeberg and Nordstrand was built up and more densely populated. This area was called Bekkelagshøgda, while the maritime area became known as Nedre Bekkelaget. This area is separated by Ormsund with Ormøya.

Until 2004 Bekkelaget and adjacent Ekeberg constituted its own borough, Ekeberg-Bekkelaget.

Bekkelaget is known nationwide for the sports club Bækkelagets SK. The local rowing club is Ormsund RK.

== See also ==
- 1953 Bekkelaget landslide
