= Flekkefjord Station =

Railway station in Norway

Flekkefjord
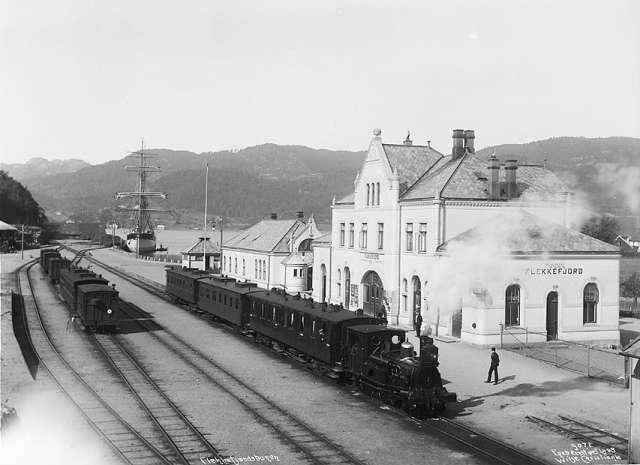
- Flekkefjord Station in 1908

General information
- Location: Flekkefjord, Flekkefjord Municipality; Norway
- Coordinates: 58°17′37″N 6°39′54″E
- Owner: Norwegian State Railways
- Operator: Norwegian State Railways
- Line: Flekkefjord Line
- Platforms: 4

Construction
- Architect: Paul Armin Due

History
- Opened: 1 November 1904
- Closed: 31 December 1990
Location

Flekkefjord Station (Norwegian: Flekkefjord stasjon) is a former railway station located in the town of Flekkefjord in Flekkefjord Municipality in Agder county, Norway. It served as the terminus of the 1,067 mm (3 ft 6 in) gauge Flekkefjord Line from 1904 to 1990. The station building was designed by Paul Armin Due and was built in brick Art Nouveau.

The station was important for transport along the coast until 1944, when the completion of the Sørland Line made Flekkefjord a branch station. At the same time, the line was converted to standard gauge, the number of station tracks was reduced, and the station received an overhaul. The station building was demolished in 1970, but the station was still served until the line closed in 1990. The tracks and depot buildings still exist.

== History ==
The Flekkefjord Line ran from Egersund to Flekkefjord, as an extension of the Jæren Line, that ran from Stavanger to Egersund. The Norwegian Parliament voted in favor of the line in 1894, and construction started two years later. While initial plans were to open the line in 1902, the station and line did not open until 1 November 1904. The line was built as a 3 ft 6 in (1,067 mm) gauge line, and the first rolling stock was reallocated from the Voss Line.

Initially, there were four trains daily in each direction, reduced to three on holidays. The most important train was the one that coordinated with the west-bound steam ship; the train would wait up to 45 minutes if the ship was delayed. This become the dominant route for people to get from Stavanger to cities along the South Coast, as well as to Oslo. In addition to passengers, major cargo shipments included seasonal shipments of herring, as well as lumber from the surrounding areas. Coal for the trains was imported by steam ship to Flekkefjord.

With the arrival of the Kragerø Line to Kragerø in 1927, and the Sørland Line to Arendal in 1935, buses were used between Flekkefjord and the terminus cities, allowing land connection between Stavanger and Oslo via Flekkefjord. At the same time, diesel multiple units were introduced on the "lightning trains", cutting travel time to Stavanger by 50 minutes to 3 hours 15 minutes.

The Flekkefjord Line was planned as part of the Sørland Line, that would make Flekkefjord a station on the line between Oslo, Kristiansand and Stavanger. Instead, the route of the Sørland Line was chosen to traverse an inner route, and the Flekkefjord Line became a 17.1 km (10.6 mi) branch line of the Sørland Line in 1944. As part of the construction, the Flekkefjord Line was converted in 1940–41 to standard gauge. The first standard gauge train, a NSB Class 18, operated on 8 August 1941. The large traffic during the reconstruction period caused so much damage to the wharf that it had to be taken out of service. The speed on the line was also reduced to 40 kilometres per hour (25 mph), as the gauge conversion was done without changing the right-of-way profile. Dual gauge was kept until 1 March 1944. At the same time the four tracks at the station were reduced to three. The cargo building was also moved three metres. In June 1945, twelve people were employed at the station.

With the introduction of standard gauge, Flekkefjord went from being an important hub for transport along the south coast, to merely being a branch station. However, the number of daily trains to Sira and Moi had increased to twelve, operated with Class 86 and Class 87 multiple units. The Class 87 was used until 1956, when Class 86 came into service. In 1966, Class 87 was reintroduced. Important cargo customers at the time were Draco (who made boats) and Halvorsens Kjelfabrikk (who made boilers). From 1981, the Class 89 came into use, remaining until the station was closed in 1990.

== Facilities ==
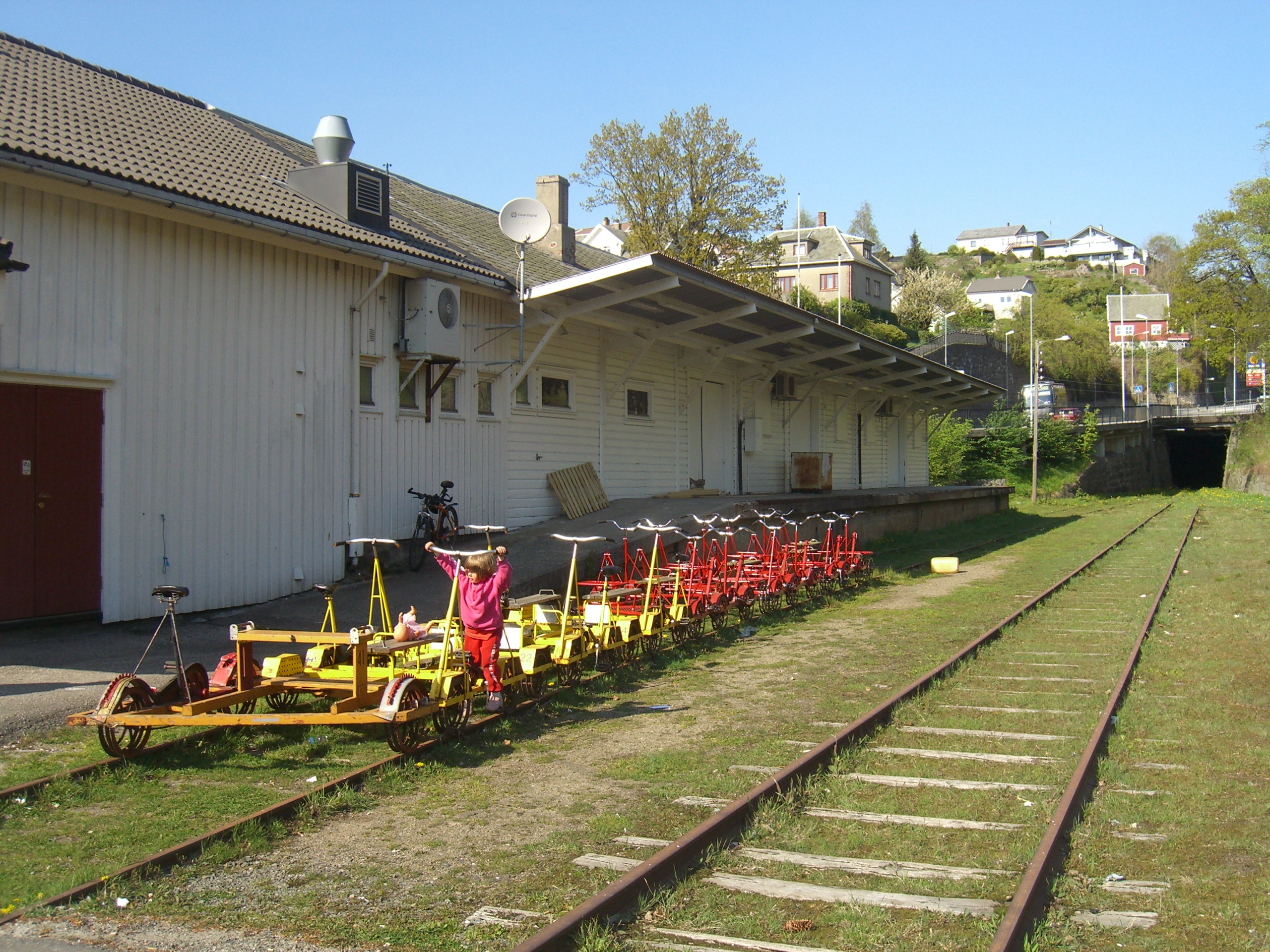
Flekkefjord Station in 2007

As the only proper station on the line, Flekkefjord was built in brick in Art Nouveau. The two-story 338 m^{2} (3,640 sq ft) building which was designed by Paul Armin Due had a ground floor with a ticket office, four offices and three waiting rooms. The second story was an apartment for the station master. Due chose to design the building symmetrically around the waiting room. It had arched windows and doors, curved corners and two round towers. This gave both a tight and soft form in organic interaction. It has been considered one of Due's best works of Art Nouveau. Beside the station there was a 196 m^{2} (2,110 sq ft) single story restaurant building. In addition to a large main building, the station had a freight building, a wharf, a locomotive and wagon depot, and a loading area. There were four tracks past the station, in addition to two track to the cargo area. The cargo building had room for three wagons. The locomotive depot had places for six steam locomotives.

The restaurant was converted into housing in the 1950s, and in May 1970 the station building was demolished to make room for a new bus station. The cargo building was refurbished to serve as a station building for passengers and as offices. The wharf was sold by the municipality in 1987, and the last train to serve the station departed on 31 December 1990. Most of the line and infrastructure is however intact.

Preceding station		Following station
Selura	Flekkefjord Line	terminus
