= SJY =

SJY may refer to:

- Seinäjoki Airport (IATA: SJY), Ilmajoki, Finland
- Sriwijaya Air (ICAO: SJY), an Indonesian airline

== See also ==
- SJ Y3 and SJ Y6, railcar models
