= Flekkefjord =

Flekkefjord may refer to:

== Places ==
- Flekkefjord (town), a town within Flekkefjord Municipality in Agder county, Norway
- Flekkefjord Municipality, a municipality in Agder county, Norway
- Flekkefjord Church, a church in the town of Flekkefjord in Flekkefjord Municipality in Agder county, Norway

== Transportation ==
- Flekkefjord Line, a former railway line in southern Norway
- Flekkefjord Station, a railway station in Flekkefjord Municipality in Agder county, Norway

== Other ==
- Flekkefjord FK, a football club based in Flekkefjord Municipality in Agder county, Norway
- Flekkefjord District Court, a former district court in Norway
- Flekkefjord prosti, a former deanery within the Church of Norway
- Flekkefjord Dampskipsselskap, a Norwegian shipping company
