= X22 =

X22 may refer to:

- X22 (New York City bus)
- Bell X-22, an American experimental aircraft
- Kh-22 (Russian: X-22), a Soviet anti-ship missile
- Paul Magriel (1946–2018), American professional backgammon and poker player
- TGOJ X22, a Swedish electric multiple unit
- ThinkPad X22, a notebook computer
- \x22, the quotation mark (Unicode codepoint hex &x22;)

== See also ==
- General Aircraft Hotspur X.22/40; military glider
