= Kragerø Line =

Former railway line in Norway

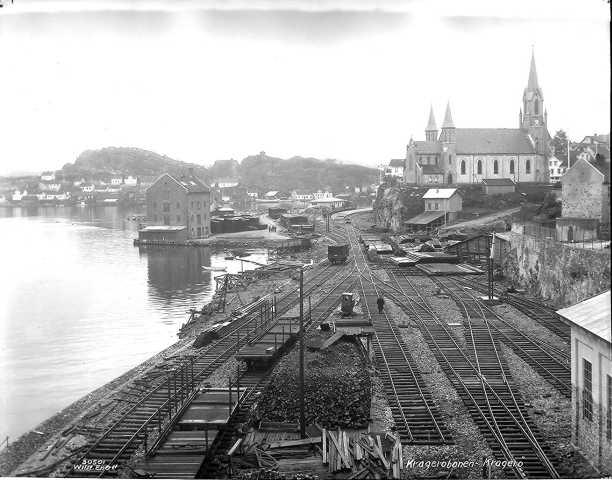
- Kragerø in 1927

Overview
- Native name: Kragerøbanen
- Status: Abandoned
- Owner: Norwegian State Railways
- Locale: Telemark
- Termini: Neslandsvatn Station; Kragerø Station
- Stations: 15

Service
- Type: Railway
- System: Norwegian Railway Network
- Operator(s): Norwegian State Railways

History
- Opened: 2 December 1927
- Closed: 31 December 1988

Technical
- Line length: 26.62 km (16.54 mi)
- Character: Passenger and freight
- Track gauge: 1,435 mm (4 ft 8 1/2 in)
- Electrification: no
- Highest elevation: 72.6 m (238 ft) amsl

The Kragerø Line (Norwegian: Kragerøbanen) was a 27-kilometer (17 mi) long railway line between Neslandsvatn and Kragerø in Telemark county, Norway. It was opened on 2 December 1927 as part of the Sørlandet Line. From 10 November 1935, the Sørlandet Line was extended from Neslandsvatn to Arendal, and the Kragerø Line became a branch. It was mostly served with feeder trains, although a through train to Oslo was kept until the 1970s. Falling ridership caused the line to become closed from 1 December 1989, along with many other branch lines. Part of the line remains, although other parts have been demolished.

== Route ==
After the line was closed, the section from Sannidal to Kragerø, roughly 7 kilometers (4.3 mi), was demolished to make way for a road. The Tangeheia Tunnel was widened and also used. The track remains from Sannidal to Neslandsvatn, although a bridge close to Sannidal has been moved to allow better height for the road. In addition, the track across five underpasses have been removed. The track area at Kragerø Station has been converted to a parking lot, and the engine shed has been demolished. The station building has been preserved.

== History ==
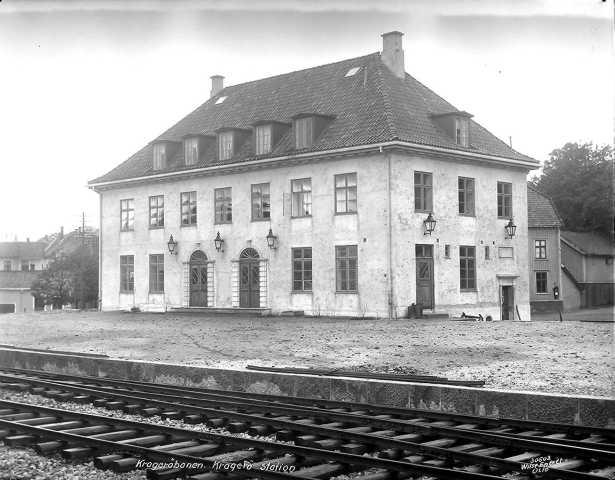
Kragerø Station

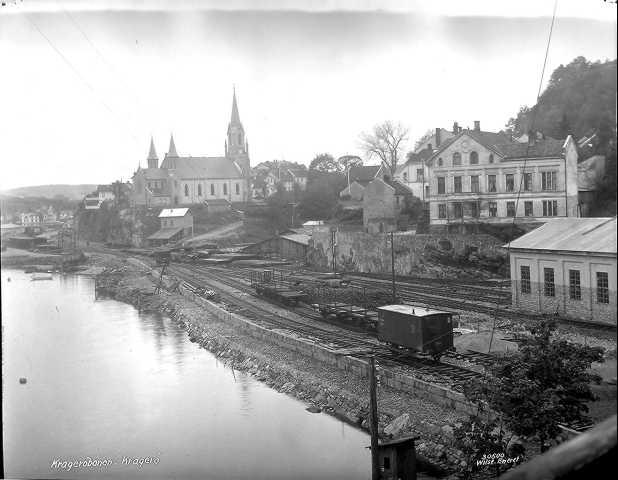

The decision to build the Kragerø Line was made by the Parliament of Norway on 9 July 1908. The decision was part of a larger plan to build the Sørlandet Line from Kongsberg to Kristiansand. It included new lines from Kongsberg to Hjuksebø, where the line would share tracks with the Bratsberg Line. From Nordagutu to Neslandsvatn, the line was planned as part of the Sørlandet Line, while the section from Neslandsvatn to Kragerø was to be temporary part of the line, until it would later be extended from Neslandsvatn to Arendal.

The section from Kongsberg to Neslandsvatn was built with a minimum curve radius of 300 meters (980 ft), while the Kragerø Line was built with 180 meters (590 ft). It was given a maximum gradient of 1.8 percent, and a track weight of 35 kilograms per meter (37 lb/ft). Eight people were killed during construction. The Kragerø Line opened on 2 December 1927, when the Sørlandet Line was extended from Lunde.

=== Operation ===
While a terminus, there was a day and a night train to Oslo West Station. Kragerø had steam ship correspondence with towns further along the coast. There was also a bus service to Flekkefjord; from there, a train service was offered along the Flekkefjord Line and Jæren Line to Stavanger. Passengers taking the night train to Kragerø, could be in Stavanger the following afternoon.

Kragerø remained the terminus of the Sørlandet Line until 10 November 1935, when the line was extended from Neslandsvatn to Arendal. Ridership fell on the line, although it retained four daily trains per day per direction. These operated between Kragerø and Neslandsvatn, where there was correspondence with the express trains on the Sørlandet Line. However, one through day train was retained until the early 1970s. The line used only steam locomotives until the late 1940s, when diesel multiple units were taken into use. At first Cmb 13 railcars and Class 87 were used, but as they were unpopular with the travelers, they were replaced by Class 86 in 1956.

The last steam trains to run on the line was Class 30, which remained until 1969. The Kragerø Line was the last to retire steam locomotives from passengers service in Norway. From June, the line received a Di2 locomotive which took over the duties of Class 30. Di2 remained in use until 1984. Kragerø Station had an Skd 202 shunter, which was replaced by Skd 206 and then Skd 220c, but in the last years there was no need for shunting, and the shunters withdrawn.

=== Closing ===
Traffic along the line dropped significantly during the 1960s and 1970. Eventually freight trains were taken out of service on the line, and freight cars were instead hooked to the DMUs. In the last years, only the one car of the DMUs were used except on Fridays and Sundays. A large part of the decrease could be allocated to the line's inferior route; for both passengers heading towards Oslo or to Agder, the line represented both longer distance and longer travel time. Traffic patterns for buses went along the coast, and towards Oslo ran via Grenland rather than inner Telemark.

On 19 February 1987, NSB's board recommended that the Kragerø Line be closed. They cited that the line needed major renovations, the rolling stock needed replacement and the lack of profitability, with the ticket revenue only covering about a quarter of operating expenses. This was part of a major decision which would also see the closing of the Numedal, Valdres, Hardanger, Flekkefjord and Skreia Lines. However, on 25 March the Railway Council voted against closing the line, stating local opposition against the proposals. On 20 April 1988, Minister of Transport Kjell Borgen presented a plan which would approve the closing of the lines. A majority for the closure was secured in parliament by Borgen's Labour Party with support from the Conservative Party and the Progress Party. The decision was made in parliament on 2 June, however some local parliamentarians from the Labour and Conservative Parties voted to keep the line Service on the line was last run on 31 December, and from 1 January 1989 the line was closed.

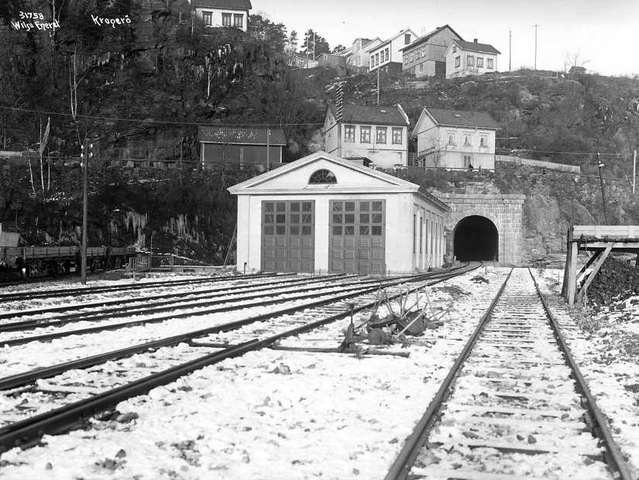
Tangeheia Tunnel in 1927, the site of the civil disobedience in 1989

The southernmost part of the line was planned used for the right-of-way for a new road. Nature and Youth had been working against the closing of the line during the 1970s, and in 1988 a local chapter was again established and started working to keep the line. They were met both with support and opposition locally. On 30 October 1989, 70 to 80 demonstrators from Nature and Youth, about half of which were locals, blocked the entrance to Tangeheia Tunnel in civil disobedience to hinder demolish of the track. The second day of the demonstration, the Norwegian Public Roads Administration reported the demonstrators to the police. Sheriff Gisle Johnson arrested five of the demonstrators, all male and from out-of-town, and four with long hair, and were fined NOK 10,000 each. During the evening, a mob of locals started attacking the remaining demonstrators with Molotov cocktails. This caused the demonstration to be moved to Sannidal.

The demonstrators remained at Sannidal for a week, and had among other things meetings with Minister of Transport Lars Gunnar Lie. The group was successful at creating large media attention around the issue, with it becoming the group's most written about environmental demonstration in Norway during the late 1980s. On 3 November, NSB announced that they would cease demolishing the upper part of the line, although by then on the lower section demolition had already begun. In September 1992, NSB's director-general Kristian Rambjør stated that closing the line had been a mistake.

In 1997, Osmund Ueland, director-general of the Norwegian National Rail Administration stated that he wanted to demolish the Kragerø Line and other closed branch lines. In 1997, the camping ground at Sannidal started renting out 15 draisines on the line, but the operations stopped in 2005. In the late 2000s, local forest owners started campaigning to remove the remaining tracks. In particular, they wanted to remove the underpass as Merkebekk in Drangedal, which has too low clearing for lumber trucks and causes the forest owners to drive the trucks an extra 3 kilometers (1.9 mi). In a decision from the Land Consolidation Court in September 2008, the land owners were giver permission to remove five underpasses between Sannidal and Neslandsvatn, located at Tveitereidvegen, one 240 meters (790 ft) north of it, at Tveitereidsbukta, at Saga and at Øygardsmyra. The removal would be at the cost of the forest owners. This permanently terminated any possibilities of running draisines on the line. In 2009, Syklistenes Landsforening stated that they wanted the line to be converted to a bicycle path.

== Future ==
In 2001, Telemark County Municipality approved plans for a new line to be built between the Vestfold Line at Porsgrunn and the Sørlandet Line at Skorstøl (near Fiane). The Grenland Line would be 59 kilometers (37 mi) long and have a station at Sannidal. It is estimated to cost NOK 3.8 billion and would allow the travel time from Kragerø to Oslo of 2 hours. To serve villages along the Sørlandet Line eastwards, the Norwegian National Rail Administration has proposed creating a regional train service between Kongsberg and Kragerø, which would allow transfer to the Grenland Line at Sannidal. In 2010, the Southwest Line was proposed by the county municipalities of Aust-Agder and Vest-Agder. The line would follow close to the same route as the Grenland Line, but would extend further south and connect to major towns along the coast. In this proposal, Kragerø is planned served by a station at Brokelandsheia. As of 2022, these plans are on hold.
