= Gulskogen Station =

Railway station in Drammen, Norway

Gulskogen
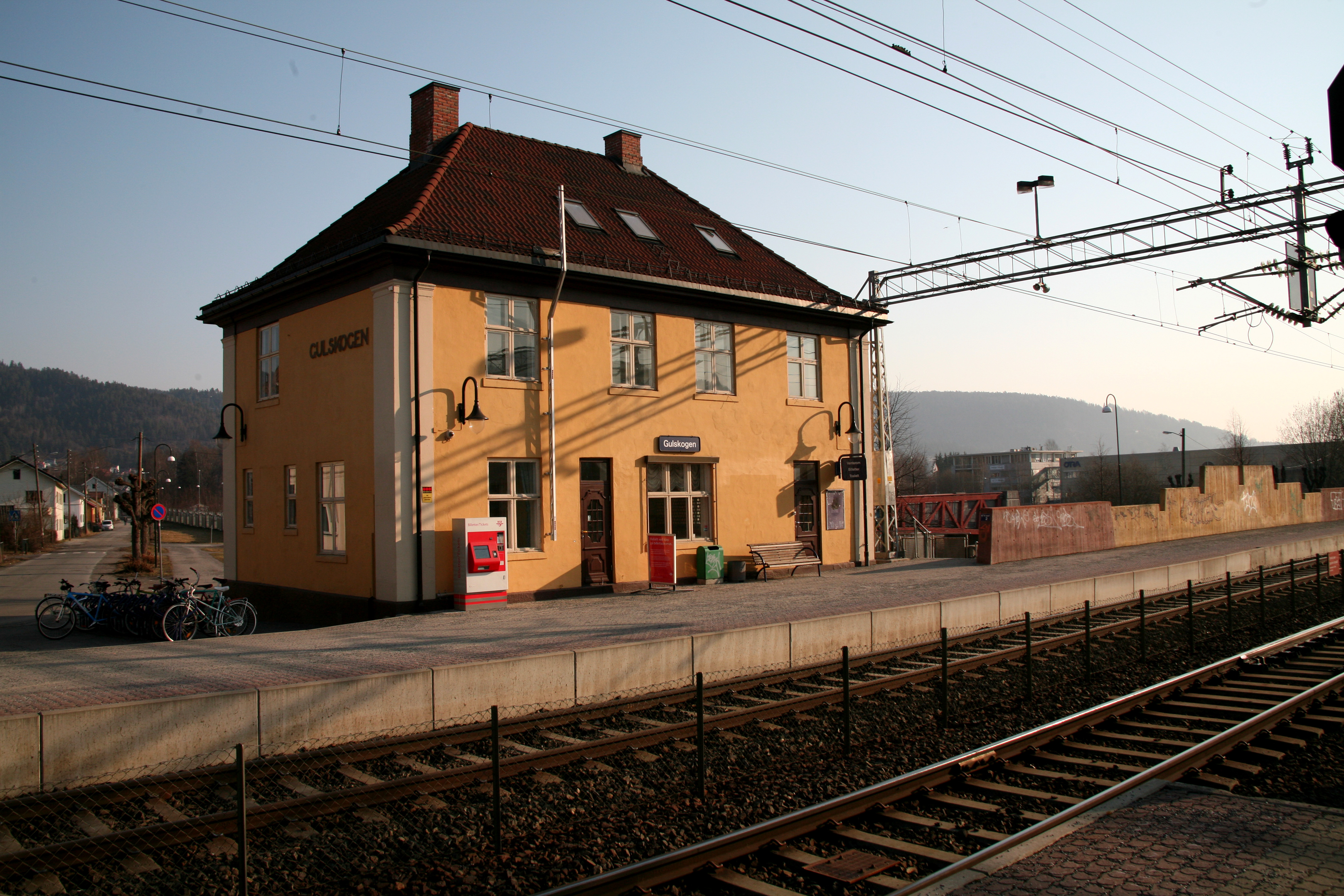

General information
- Location: Gulskogen, Drammen; Norway
- Coordinates: 59°44′37.96″N 10°9′38.60″E
- Elevation: 8.0 m (26.2 ft) AMSL
- Owner: Bane NOR
- Operator: Vy
- Line: Sørlandet Line
- Distance: 55.27 km (34.34 mi)
- Platforms: 1

History
- Opened: 1868
Location
- Location within Buskerud Location within Norway

Gulskogen Station (Norwegian: Gulskogen stasjon) is located in the village of Gulskogen in Drammen, Norway on the Sørlandet Line, on a section previously regarded as the Randsfjorden Line. The station is served by local trains between Kongsberg via Oslo to Eidsvoll operated by Vy.

== History ==
The station was opened in 1868, two years after the connection between Drammen and Vikersund was completed. The first station building, designed by Henrik Bull, was finished in 1868. It was demolished at an unknown date. A second building was built in 1915 by Norwegian State Railways when its architectural office was run by Gudmund Hoel.

Preceding station			Following station
Mjøndalen	Sørlandet Line		Drammen
Preceding station	Local trains		Following station
Mjøndalen	R12	Kongsberg–Oslo S–Eidsvoll	Drammen
