= Gudmund Hoel =

Norwegian architect (1877–1956)

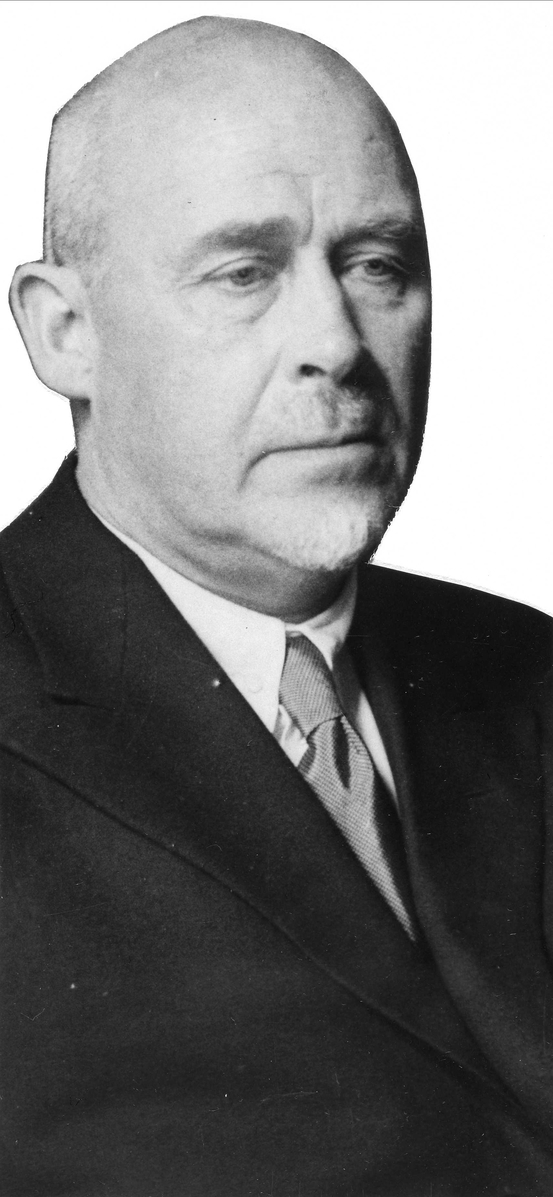
Gudmund Hoel

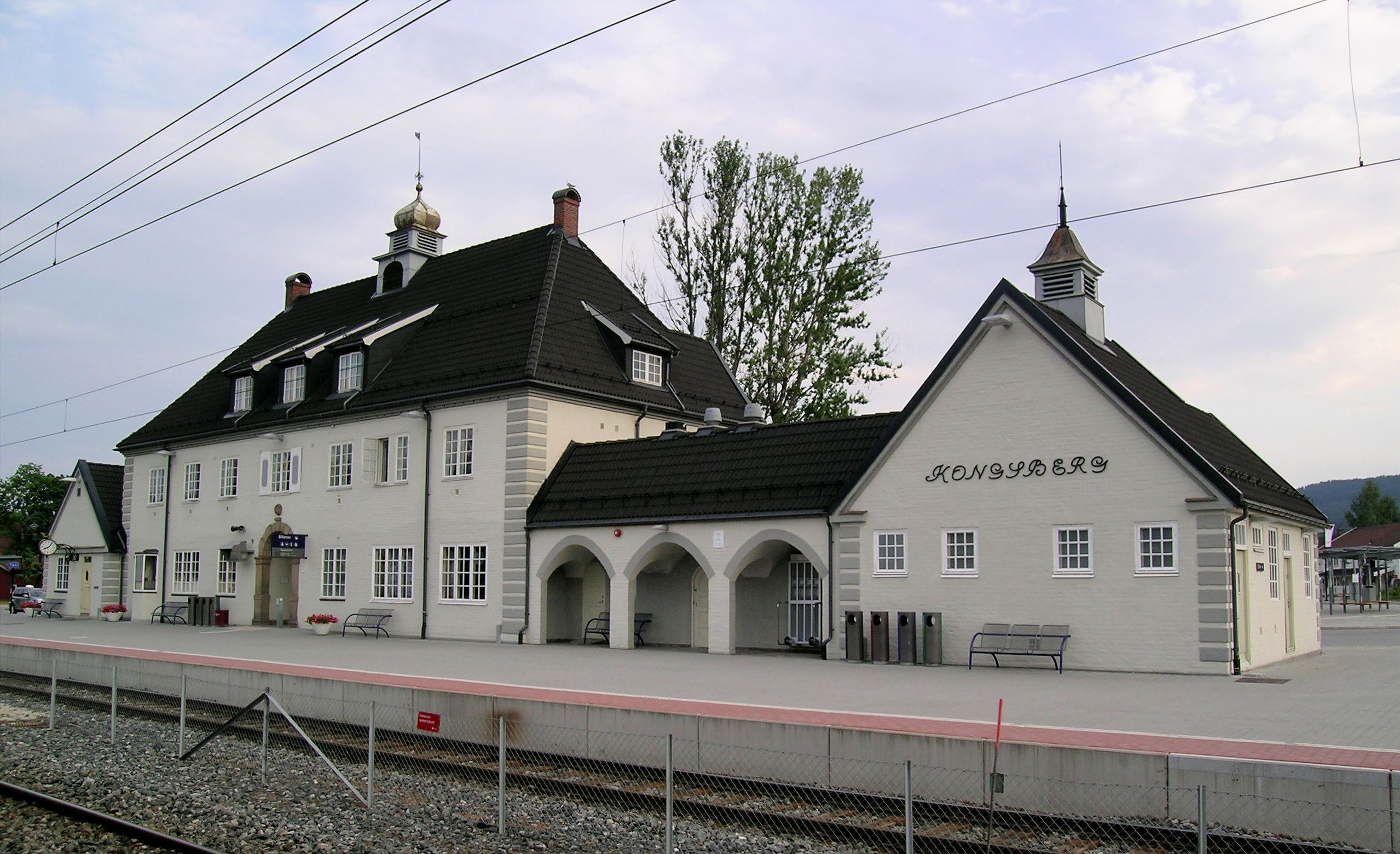
Kongsberg Station on Sørlandsbanen designed by Hoel

Gudmund Hoel (25 September 1877 – 7 September 1956) was a Norwegian architect. He is regarded as the second-most influential railway architect in Norway, after Paul Due.

== Biography ==
He was born in Kragerø, Norway. Hoel graduated from Kristiania Tekniske Skole (today Oslo University College) in 1896. For six years he had various assistant jobs at architecture firms in Norway and Germany. From 1903-04, he conducted study trips to the United States. In 1904, he started working for Holger Sinding-Larsen, and in 1910 he established his own firm.

In 1913, he was appointed director of the newly established NSB Arkitektkontor, an in-house division of the Norwegian State Railways. He remained director there until he retired in 1947. His early works were mostly in historicism, but from the 1920s he started designing in neoclassicism.

== Selected works ==
- Gulskogen Station on Randsfjordbanen (1915)
- Tønsberg Station on Vestfoldbanen (1915)
- Kragerø Station on Kragerøbanen(1927)
- Arendal Station on Arendalsbanen (1930)
- Lillestrøm Station on Gardermobanen (built 1930, opened in 1934)

== Other sources ==
- Hartmann, Eivind; Mangset, Øistein; Reisegg, Øyvind (1997). Neste stasjon (in Norwegian). Gyldendal Norsk Forlag. p. 78. ISBN 82-05-25294-7.
