= Flekkefjord Line =

Former railway line in Agder, Norway

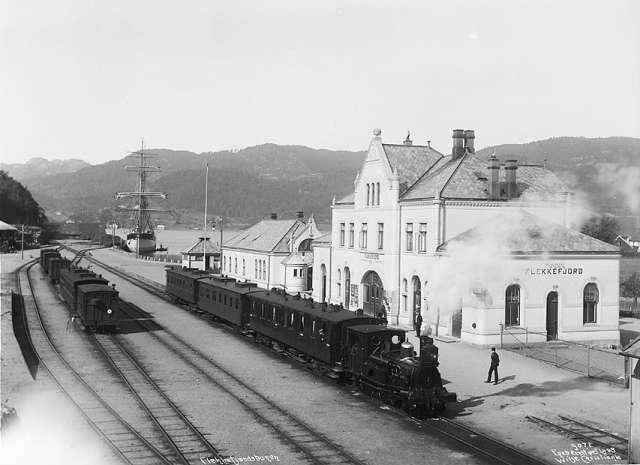
- Flekkefjord Station in 1908

Overview
- Native name: Flekkefjordbanen
- Status: Abandoned
- Owner: Norwegian State Railways
- Termini: Sira; Flekkefjord

Service
- Type: Railway
- System: Norwegian railway
- Operator: Norwegian State Railways

History
- Opened: 1 November 1904
- Closed: 31 December 1990

Technical
- Line length: 17.1 km (10.6 mi)
- Number of tracks: Single
- Character: Passenger and freight
- Track gauge: 1,435 mm (4 ft 8 1/2 in)
- Electrification: No

The Flekkefjord Line (Norwegian: Flekkefjordbanen) is a 17.1-kilometre (10.6 mi) abandoned branch line to the Sørland Line. It ran between Sira and Flekkefjord in Agder county, Norway. The only current activity on the line is tourist draisines. The station buildings along the line were designed by the architect Paul Armin Due—these have all been demolished.

The line opened in 1904 as a 64-kilometre (40 mi) extension of the narrow gauge Jæren Line. It was planned as the first step of a main line along the South Coast. At Flekkefjord, there was steam ship connection, onwards to Oslo. In 1941, the line was converted to standard gauge, and in 1944 the Sørland Line was completed. The western part of the Flekkefjord Line was integrated into it, while the remaining section became the branch line that kept the name Flekkefjord Line. During the 1940s, steam locomotive-hauled trains were replaced by railcars. Following the declining traffic, in part due to the slow speeds caused by the line's narrow profile, the line was closed, with the last trains running in 1990.

== History ==
=== Construction ===
The first committee that looked into the possibility of a railway to Flekkefjord was created in 1875. After the completion of Jæren Line from Stavanger to Egersund, in 1878, proposals were made to build an extension westwards along the coast, that eventually would reach Oslo. The first part of what was named the Vestland Line was passed by Parliament in 1894, and would run from Egersund, via Sira, to Flekkefjord. The initial proposal proposed that the line would eventually continue onwards via Mandal to Kristiansand. The decision to build the line was taken by the Parliament of Norway in 1894. Construction started in 1896, and was originally planned to be completed by 1902. However, delays prevented the line from being be brought into use before 1 November 1904. The line was built by the Norwegian State Railways (NSB) and was 64 km (40 mi) long.

The coast between Egersund and Flekkefjord would give a very difficult route to build, so it was decided to build a more inland line. Like the Jæren Line, and most railways being built at the time, the Flekkefjord Line was built in 1,067 mm (3 ft 6 in) narrow gauge. Both telephone and telegraph cables were laid along the line. Along the section from Sirnes to Flekkefjord, there were many vertical cliffs straight into the fjord, forcing 5.4 km (3.4 mi), or 38 percent, of the line to be built in tunnels. Of the whole length from Egersund to Flekkefjord, there are 46 tunnels, totaling 8.8 km (5.5 mi). The most prominent was Ravnejuret Tunnel which is 1,174 m (3,852 ft) long. Just before Flekkefjord, a 71-metre (233 ft) bridge was built that crosses Selurelva; it was a reused bridge from the Voss Line. In total, about 12% of the line consisted of tunnels. Francis Hagerup, when delivering the line's opening speech, remarked that no other railway had until then been more difficult to construct.

All the stations along the line were designed by Paul Armin Due, with all but the terminal station built in wood. Flekkefjord Station was built as a three-story brick building in Art Nouveau. In addition, there was construction a depot and a wharf at Flekkefjord. Passengers could transfer to steam ship services that operated eastwards along the south coast towards Oslo.

=== Pre-war operations ===
The first part of the line to open for temporary operation was between Flekkefjord and Moi on 1 October 1904. For the official opening, the town of Flekkefjord was adorned with Norwegian flags. A train departed to Egersund on 31 October 1904 with several notable passengers: Prime Minister Francis Hagerup, State Railways director Elias Sunde and board member Sven Aarrestad, director of traffic Jens Christian Mellbye, Flekkefjord's mayor and city council as well as other mayors of the district. Festivities continued on the next day, when the train returned from Egersund to Flekkefjord.

Initially there were four services in each direction each day, with three services on holy days. The train that connected with the steam ship would wait up to 45 minutes in case of delays, to allow connection. Until 1927, the routes remained the same. That year, the Kragerø Line opened, and it became possible to take a night train from Oslo to Kragerø, continue by bus to Flekkefjord, and be in Stavanger the following afternoon. Travel time was further reduced when the Sørland Line was extended to Arendal in 1935. The initial rolling stock was from the Voss Line, and some of the bridges and track was from that line too. The Voss Line was being upgraded to 25-kilogram (55 lb) rail tracks, and 25 km (16 mi) of 17 kg (37 lb) track was used on the Flekkefjord Line.

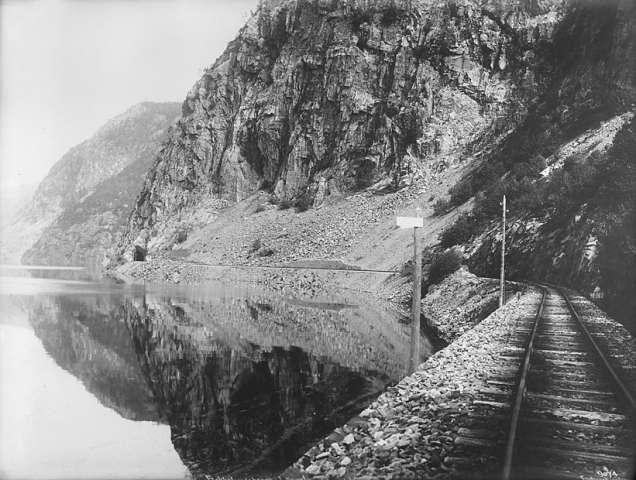
Flekkefjord Line at Lundevatnet

Until 1927, all trains were operated with steam locomotives. NSB introduced the first diesel multiple unit with the introduction of "lightning trains" that corresponded with coach services that connected with the Kragerø Line. The first were Class 14 railcars. These reduced travel time from Flekkefjord to Stavanger by 50 minutes to 3 hours 15 minutes. In addition to passengers, major cargo were herring and lumber.

=== Connecting the coast ===
In 1923, it was decided by parliament that the Sørland Line, that would connect Oslo, Kristiansand and Stavanger, would follow an inner route. The section of the Flekkefjord Line from Egersund to Sira would become part of that line, while the eastern 17.1 km (10.6 mi) from Sira to Flekkefjord would become a branch line, retaining the Flekkefjord Line name. Since the Sørland Line needed to be built from the east, construction along the Flekkefjord Line did not start until 1940. After the German occupation of Norway during World War II, the German occupation forces were rebuilding the narrow gauge railways to standard gauge. In 1940–41, the Flekkefjord and Jæren Lines were rebuilt to dual gauge. Not until 1944 was the Flekkefjord Line only standard gauge.

Due to limited funds, and unlike the rest of the Jæren Line, the profile of the Flekkefjord Line was not changed during the conversion of gauge. This gave a speed limit of 40 kilometres per hour (25 mph), and creative solutions such as lowering height of the ballast by 20 cm (7.9 in). The route from Egersund to Sira received a better upgrade, since it was to become part of the main line through Southern Norway. The route between Sira and Sirnes was completely rebuilt. This gave severe limits to the use of the section between Flekkefjord and Sirnes; most classes of trains could not run on the line, as were freight trains.

=== Post-war operations ===
After the line had been relegated to a branch line, traffic fell considerably. Another factor was car traffic, which did not exist in Flekkefjord until 1918, but thereafter became widespread. After the war, Class 20 steam locomotives were used on the line. During the 1940, several railcars of Class 87 were taken into use, and soon all passenger trains were operated using such units. From 1956 to 1966, also Class 86 units were used on the line, but the narrow profile of the tunnels made operations problematic. Class 87 remained in service until 1981, when used Class 89 units were bought from Sweden. At first, two Y7 units were brought to Norway on 23 January and taken into service on 24 February. After they proved to work well, NSB bought them for 95,000 Swedish kronor plus freight. Two more units were bought in 1986.

=== Closing ===
The line had major limitations on speed, and also served the "wrong direction", heading westwards into less populated areas instead of the populated parts of Agder in the east. Major investments would be needed to upgrade the line to a suitable speed, and through the 1970s this became an important issue of debate. On the other hand, the line had among the highest ridership of the branch lines, with 120,000 passengers per year, which was for instance 50% higher than the Arendal Line, which was not closed. However, parliament decided to close the line, along with several other branch lines, in 1988, with effect from 1990. The last scheduled train ran on 31 December 1990.

There were plans to establish private operations along the line. Continental Railway Systems was established by Rasmus Surdal. The company would be allowed to use the rolling stock and infrastructure, and two of the trains were painted white. However, it was not possible for the company to get the necessary bank surety demanded by NSB, and nothing came of the plans.

The line has been suggested preserved as a cultural heritage, since it represents one of very few railways with the original narrow gauge profile intact. However, all stations have been demolished; Flekkefjord in 1970, Sirnes in 1977 and Flikkeid in 1988. The organization Friends of the Flekkefjord Line offer rental of draisines for tourists since the closure of the line, and a round trip from Flekkefjord to Bakkekleivi just outside Sira takes about three hours. However, the Norwegian National Rail Administration have since banned the operation of draisines until the line is fully fenced in.

== See also ==
- Narrow gauge railways in Norway
