= Numedal Line =

Railway in Buskerud county, Norway

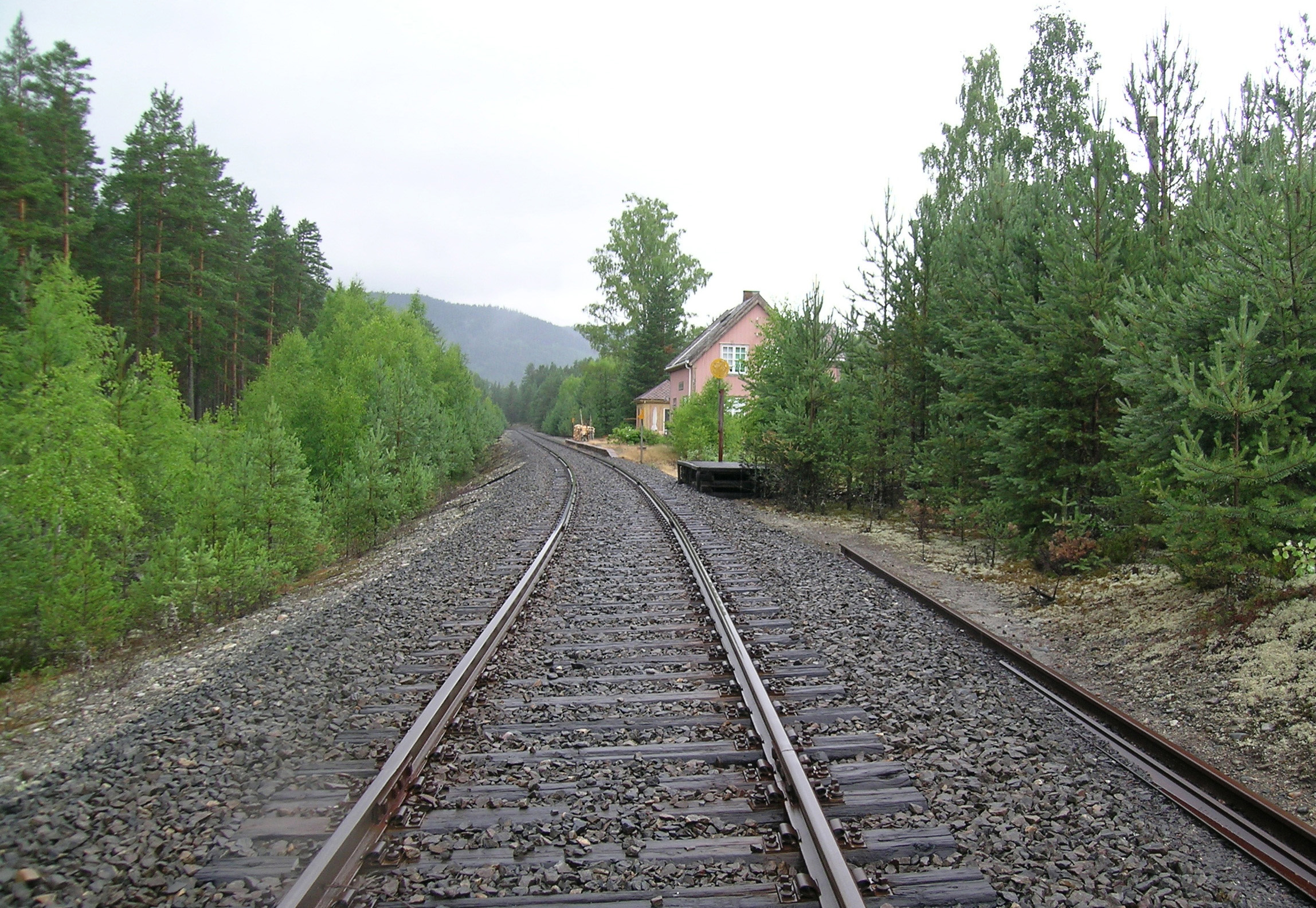
- The Numedal Line at Pikerfoss

Overview
- Native name: Numedalsbanen
- Owner: Norwegian National Rail Administration
- Termini: Kongsberg Station; Rødberg

Service
- Type: Railway
- System: Norwegian railways

History
- Opened: 19 November 1927

Technical
- Line length: 92.8 km (57.7 mi)
- Number of tracks: Single
- Track gauge: 1,435 mm (4 ft 8 1/2 in)
- Electrification: No
- Highest elevation: 370.9 metres (1,217 ft)

The Numedal Line (Norwegian: Numedalsbanen) is a 92.8-kilometer (57.7 mi) long railway line that runs up the Numedal valley between Kongsberg and Rødberg in Buskerud county, Norway. Built and operated by the Norwegian State Railways, the non-electrified, standard gauge line passes through the municipalities of Kongsberg, Flesberg, Rollag and Nore og Uvdal. It is now owned by the Norwegian National Rail Administration.

The first plans for a line through Numedal were launched after the Sørland Line reached in Kongsberg in 1871. After it was decided that the Bergen Line would instead follow Hallingdal, the Numedal plans lay dead until it was decided that a railway was necessary to build two hydroelectric power stations near Rødberg. The plans were passed in 1918, the first trains started running in 1924 and the line was officially opened in 1927. At first all services were provided with steam locomotives, but from the 1930s diesel multiple units were used for passenger trains. The line was frequented with classes Cmd 16, 86, 87 and 91. The last regular train ran in 1988; since, there has been sporadic freight service and some heritage trains running from Kongsberg to Rollag. Draisine rental is available on the section from Veggli to Rødberg.

In 2013, Jernbaneverket reopened a 30 km stretch between Kongsberg and Flesberg, to support the forestry industry. Following a derailment in April 2014, the entire stretch was upgraded with new sleepers.

== Route ==
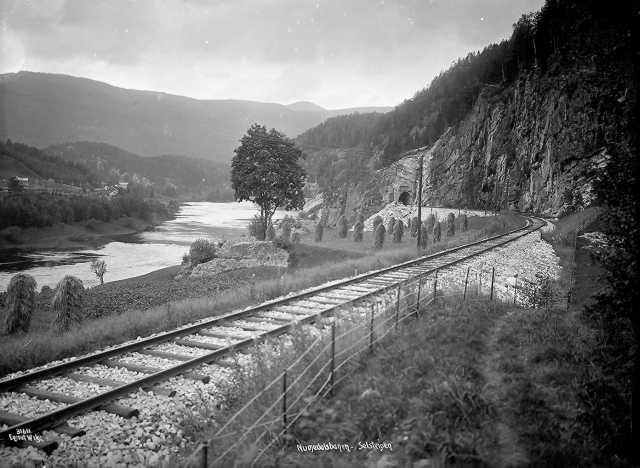
Selsteigen in 1927

The Numedal Line branches off from the Sørland Line at Kongsberg Station, which is located 99.37 kilometers (61.75 mi) from Oslo Central Station and 161.9 meters (531 ft) above mean sea level (AMSL). The line runs past four stops, Spiten, Pikerfoss, Gleda and Herbru, before reaching a branch to Svene Gravel Pit, 3.48 kilometers (2.16 mi) from Kongsberg. The line continues past the halts Ramsrud, Svene, Furuly and Toresplassen before reaching Lampeland Station, 10.50 kilometers (6.52 mi) from Kongsberg. The line then passes over Lyngdalselva on a 27-meter (89 ft) bridge and continues past the stops Fløtterud, Ruud, Vangestad and Eie before reaching the branch to the sawmill Numedal Bruk, 29.69 kilometers (18.45 mi) from Kongsberg, which is located just south of Flesberg Station.

The line continues past the stops Bjørnsrud, Bakkerud and Fossan before reaching the 228-meter (748 ft) Helle Tunnel and then Djupdal Station 40.63 kilometers (25.25 mi) after Kongsberg. The line then runs through the 78-meter (256 ft) Ulvik Tunnel and the 57-meter (187 ft) Gygrestigen Tunnel. It then passes the halt Selsteigen before running through the 44-meter (144 ft) Selsteigen Tunnel. After passing through the halt Kjome, the line reaches Rollag Station, which is 46.80 kilometers (29.08 mi) from Kongsberg. Since 1989, this is the furthest north the line is kept operational, although the track remains all the way to Rødberg.

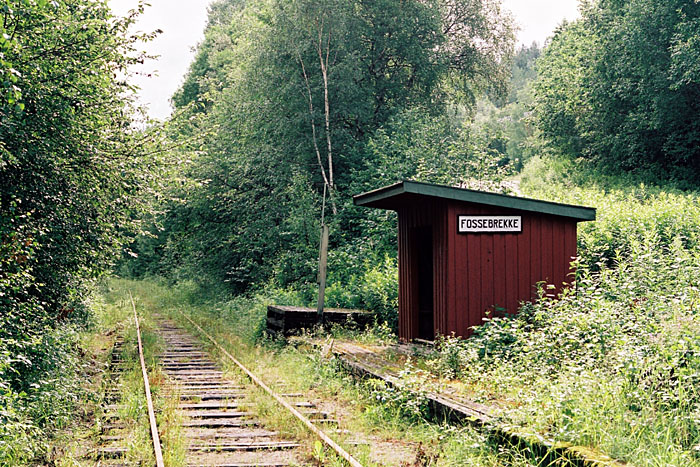
Fossebrekke

The line continues past the stops Tråen, Rollag kirke, Bråten, Sjorsåte, over the 65-meter (213 ft) Bruhaug Bridge, past the stops Laugi, Vamre, Risteigen and then passes over the river Veggli elv on a 30-meter-long (98 ft) bridge. At 60.81 kilometers (37.79 mi) after Kongsberg the line reaches Veggli Station, before continuing past the stops Tveitkåsa, Kjerre, Fossebrekke and then through two tunnels, Gjeiteryggen I and Gjeiteryggen II, which are 572 meters (1,877 ft) and 246 meters (807 ft) long, respectively. The line then passes by the stops Kravikfjord, Kittelsland, Eidsstrykken, a 30-meter (98 ft) bridge over Eidsåa, the stops Norefjord, Svendsrud and the 146-meter (479 ft) Rundberg Tunnel. The line then runs past the stop Midtstigen and Søndre Sandnes before running through five tunnels, named Sandnes I and II, Vrennedalen I and II, and Bondeberg, which are between 12 and 140 meters (39 and 459 ft) long. Just before Gvammen Station, which is 87.39 kilometers (54.30 mi) from Kongsberg, there is a branch to Nore II Power Station.

The line then runs through six tunnels, named Gvamsås I through V, and Hvilsten. These are between 156 and 16 metres (512 and 52 ft) long. The line then passes past Rødberg vokterbolig, which is 90.92 kilometers (56.50 mi) form Kongsberg and is, at 395.0 metres (1,295.9 ft) AMSL the highest point on the line. The line then passes over Uvdalselva on a 35-meter (115 ft) combined road and rail bridge, before reaching Rødberg, 92.84 kilometers (57.69 mi) from Kongsberg.

== History ==
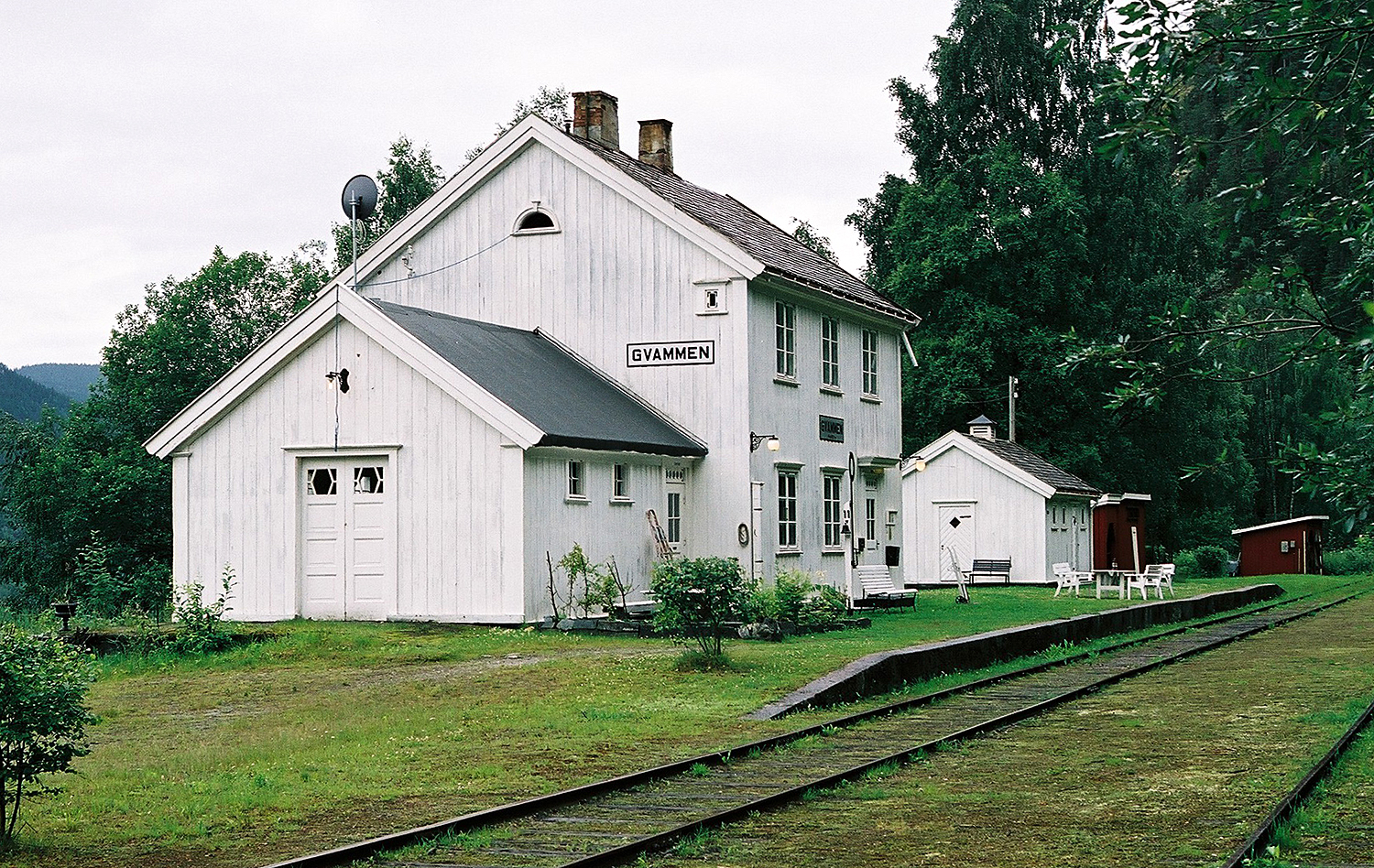
Gvammen Station

With the construction of the Sørland Line to Kongsberg, which opened on 10 November 1871, proposals were launched to extend the line up Numedal. On 16 August 1873, a meeting was held between representatives from the municipalities in Numedal to discuss how they could convince national politicians to build the Bergen Line through Numedal. However, instead the Bergen Line was decided to run through Hallingdal. What finally spurred the construction was the construction of hydroelectric power stations in the valley. In 1907, the government, through its power agency, had secured rights to build a power station in the rivers Numedalslågen and Tunnhovdfjorden. The state saw it as advantageous to build a railway through the valley to aid construction of Nore I and Nore II Power Station, despite the line not being on the railway plan. This was because machines weighing up to 40 tonnes (39 long tons; 44 short tons) would have to be transported up the valley. The initial estimates for the line was a cost of 8.3 million Norwegian krone (NOK).

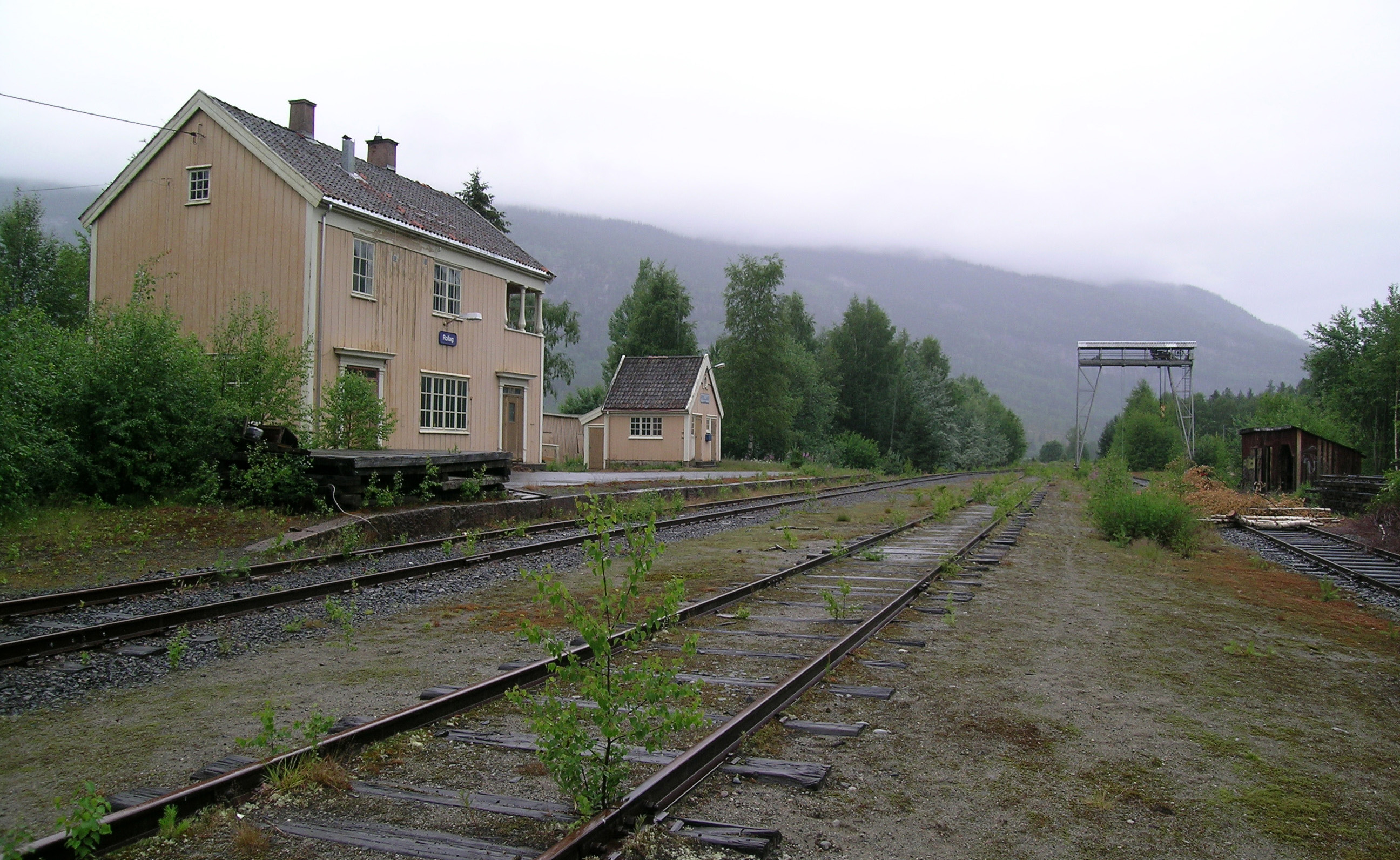
The station area at Rollag

On 3 August 1918, the line was passed by the Parliament of Norway and it was decided that the line was to be built with standard gauge, which by then had become the norm. The decision was controversial, as the line was expected to have little traffic and would therefore not be profitable. A minority of the parliamentarians instead wanted the line to be built with narrow gauge to reduce construction costs. The state required that local municipalities and counties contributed to some of the investment costs. NOK 1.2 million was paid by Buskerud County Municipality, while NOK 2.17 million million was paid by the various municipalities. The largest amounts were paid by Flesberg with NOK 635,000, Nore with NOK 615,000 and Rollag with NOK 517,000, while Uvdal paid NOK 198,000, Kongsberg NOK 125,000 and Drammen NOK 80,000.

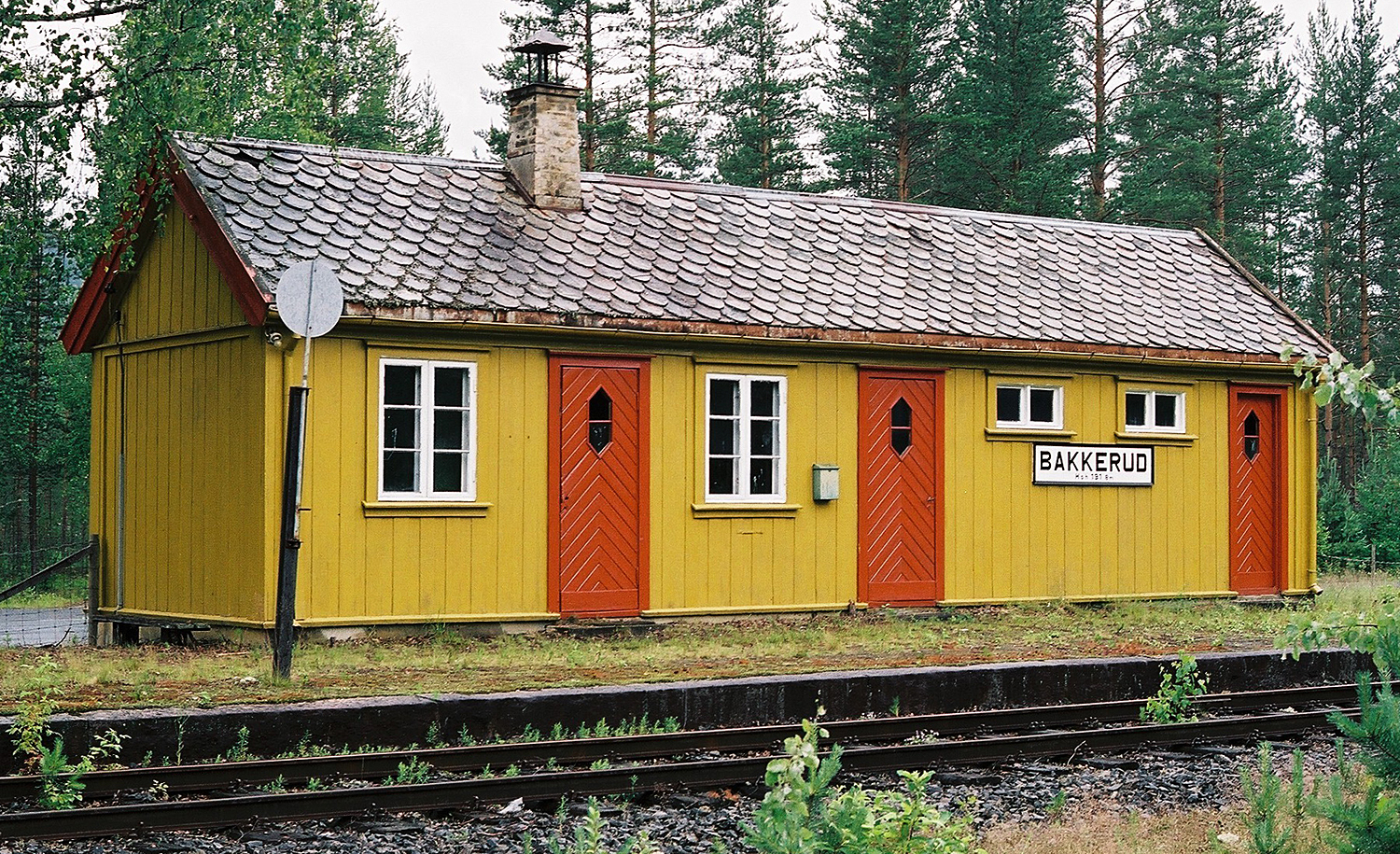
Bakkerud Station

Siting commenced in 1918, and by 1919, an administration for the works had been established in Kongsberg. Construction commenced on 2 July 1920, between Fossan and Bratterud. However, there quickly arose a strike, resulting in construction not being taken up until March 1921. Final approval by parliament was first made on 20 July 1921. Most of the construction was done using hand tools. 543,000 cubic meters (19,200,000 cu ft) of earth was moved, 217,000 cubic meters (7,700,000 cu ft) of rock was blasted and 2.3 kilometers (1.4 mi) of tunnel were built. 190,000 cubic meters (6,700,000 cu ft) of ballast stone were used, most of it from the gravel pits at Bevergrenda, Guribråten and Stevningsmogen, Tjuvhaugen and Skarpsmoen. The whole construction used seven million work hours and for the tunneling, each work hour gave 7 millimetres (0.28 in) of progress. Most of the tracks were used from other railways. Five of the station buildings, at Vangestad, Flesberg, Djupdal, Tråen and Kravikfjord, were workmen's sheds which had been placed on a foundation.

From 1924, the railway was taken partially into use. Trains could run the 36 kilometers (22 mi) from Kongsberg to Bakkerød from 15 November 1924, the 65 kilometers (40 mi) to Kjærre from 1 December 1925 and to Rødberg from 1 December 1926. These trains included transport of 950 tonnes (930 long tons; 1,050 short tons) of cement and 590 tonnes (580 long tons; 650 short tons) for the railway bridges. In total 4,300 wagon loads were transported before the official opening, of which about half was for the power stations. Because of the delay of building the line, it could only be used during part of the construction period for the power stations.

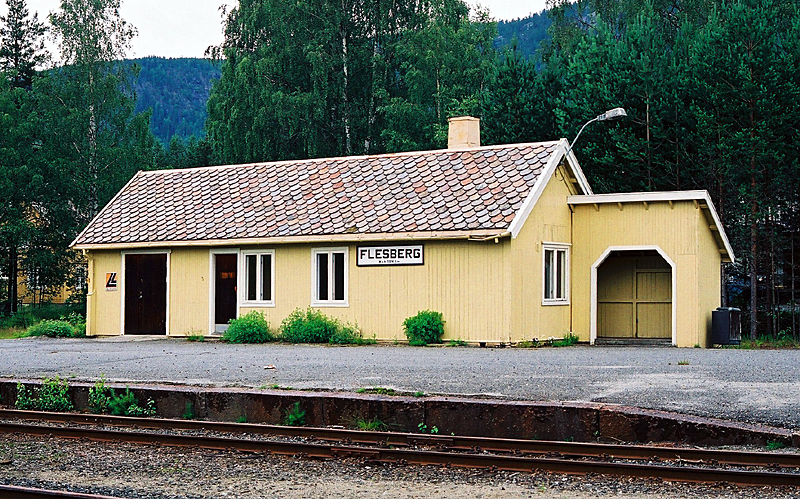
Flesberg Station

The official opening took place on 19 November 1927 by King Haakon VII. When the line opened there were 21 staffed stations on the line. Up to 70 people worked on the line, in addition to station employees. In 1932, the operations were rationalized, cutting costs from NOK 426,000 to NOK 310,000 per year. This involved removing the station masters at fifteen stations and replacing them with a clerk.

Initially, all trains on the line were hauled by steam locomotives, in particular NSB Class 20 and NSB Class 21 brought in used from other lines. The first diesel multiple units were taken into use in the 1930s, with the line seeing the use of both NSB Class Cmb 16 and Kristine Valdresdatter. During World War II, the line was again entirely hauled by steam locomotives and the service was reduced considerably. By 1945, there were three round trips per week, but after the war ended, the frequency increased and by 1947 there were four daily round trips. Various classes of multiple units have been used, including NSB Class 86, NSB Class 87 and NSB Class 91. During the 1950s, there were sometimes also trains that operated just from Kongsberg to Veggli.

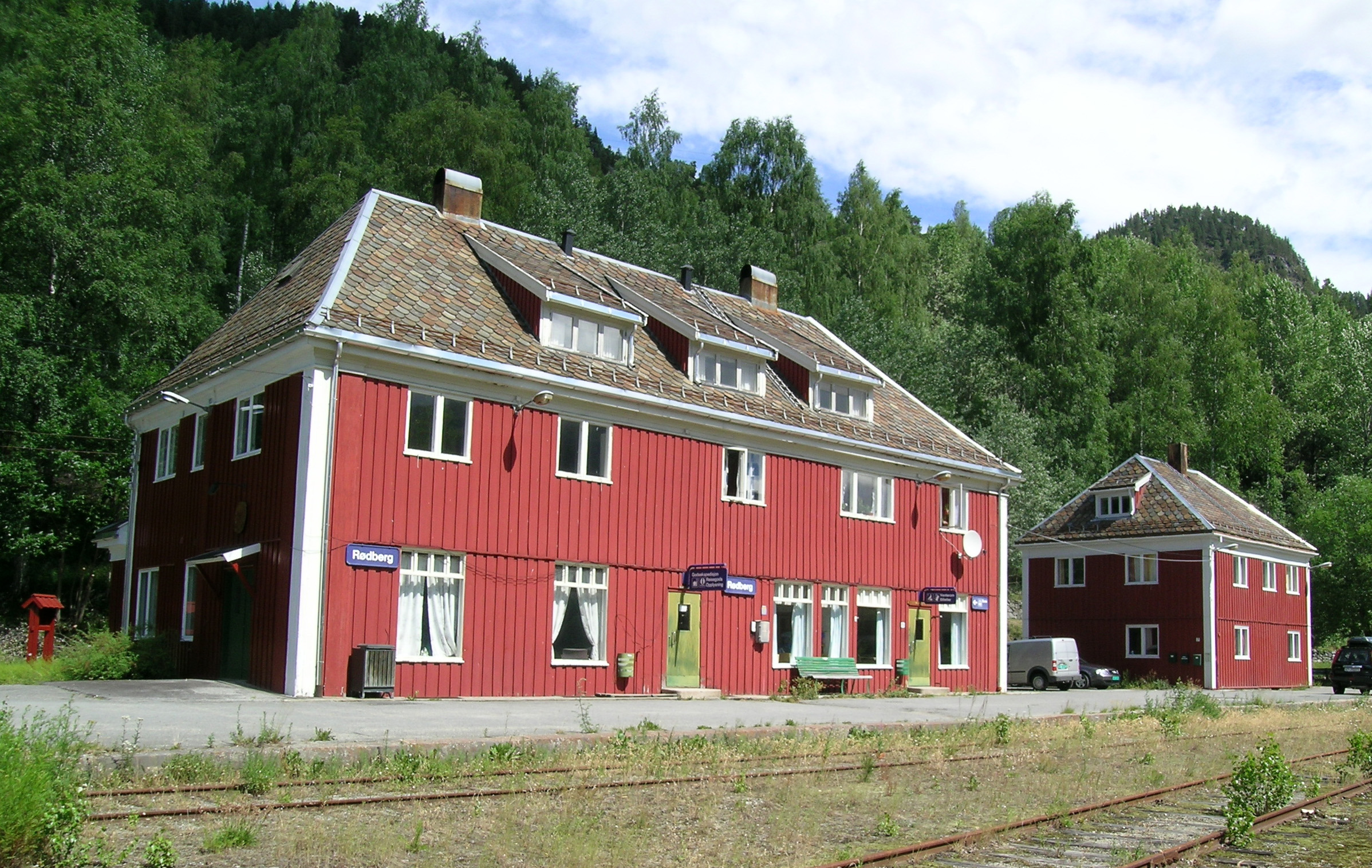
Rødberg Station was the terminus of the line.

Because the conductors and engineers often knew where the locals lived or were headed, trains would make non-scheduled stops to disembark passengers to allow them a shorter walk. In the 1960s, the number of round trips was reduced to three per day, allowing the whole service to be operated with a single unit. NSB used steam power for freight trains until 1970, when NSB's last scheduled steam locomotive service hauled a gravel train from Svene to Kongsberg. For a short period during the 1980s, there were also school trains, but as this forced NSB to operate two multiple units on the line, it proved too expensive and was soon afterwards again provided by bus.

Discussion about closing the line started in the 1950s, and the line became a candidate every time NSB and the parliament discussed closures. In 1988, the parliament decided to close many Norwegian lines, including the Numedal Line, although it was decided that the section from Kongsberg to Rollag was to be kept for freight traffic. The last passenger train operated on 31 December 1988 and the line north of Rollag was officially closed on 1 January 1989. By the time the line closed in 1989, manning remained at only three stations: Flesberg, Veggli and Rødberg. NSB retained some traffic south of Flesberg; in 1993 the company hauled 30,000 tonnes (30,000 long tons; 33,000 short tons) of gravel and 25,000 tonnes (25,000 long tons; 28,000 short tons) of lumber along the line.

After the closure, the non-profit organization Friends of the Numedal Line was established and offered occasional heritage rides along the line. It maintains the tracks between Rollag and Rødberg and offers draisine rental between Veggli and Rødberg. Irregular transport from the gravel pit at Svene and the sawmill Numedal Bruk at Flesberg. The latter is operated by Tågåkeriet i Bergslagen and hauls lumber from Uddevalla, Sweden. The stretch from Flesberg to Rødberg is suggested preserved by the Norwegian Directorate for Cultural Heritage.
