= SJ X40 =

Swedish electric train

X40
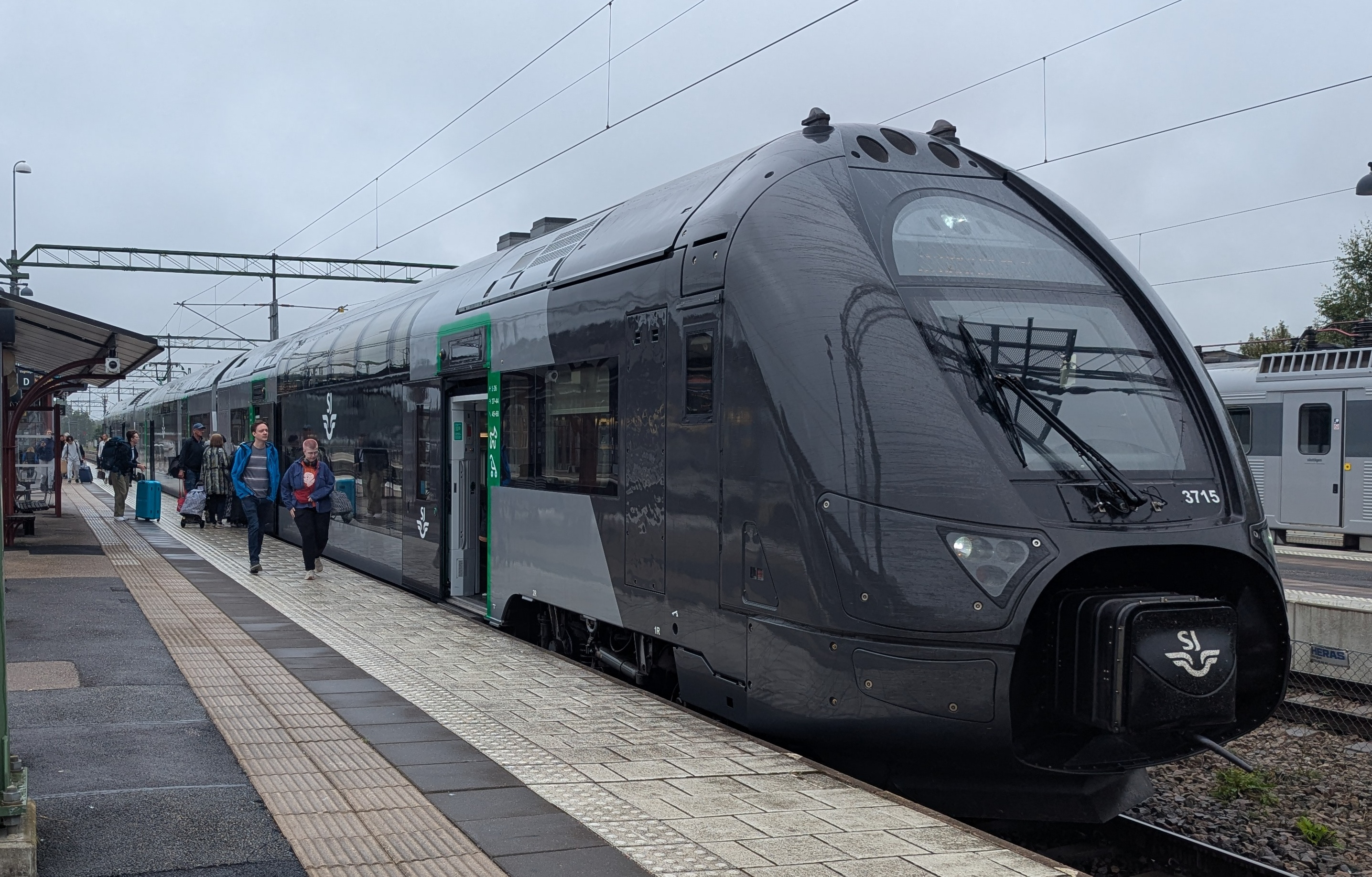
- A refurbished X40 at Herrljunga
- In service: 2006–present
- Manufacturer: Alstom
- Built at: Salzgitter, Lower Saxony, Germany
- Family name: Coradia Duplex
- Constructed: 2004–2008
- Number built: 43
- Formation: 2 cars (16 units); 3 cars (27 units)
- Fleet numbers: 3301-3343
- Capacity: 153 (2 cars); 252 (3 cars)
- Operator: SJ
- Depot: Hagalund

Specifications
- Train length: 55,100 mm (180 ft 9 in) (2 cars); 81,500 mm (267 ft 5 in) (3 cars)
- Maximum speed: 200 km/h (125 mph)
- Weight: 140 t (137.8 long tons; 154.3 short tons) (2 cars); 205 t (202 long tons; 226 short tons) (3 cars)
- Power output: 1,600 kW (2,100 hp) (2 cars); 2,400 kW (3,200 hp) (3 cars)
- Electric system: 15 kV 16.7 Hz AC catenary
- Current collection: Pantograph
- Safety system: ATC-2
- Track gauge: 1,435 mm (4 ft 8 1/2 in)

The X40 is a series of electric multiple units operated by SJ, the primary passenger train operator in Sweden. They are in service from Stockholm to Linköping, Västerås/Örebro, Uppsala and Gävle/Sandviken, and since 2010 to Gothenburg via Västerås. The double decker trains were built by Alstom from 2004 to 2008, with 43 units being delivered, either in a two-car or three-car configuration. It is based on the Coradia series, very similar to the French SNCF Class Z 26500 double decker trains, and similar to the X60-series.

The X40 is the first true double-decker train to operate in Sweden, although the first and last cars of the Y3 were built in a style similar to dome cars, connected to single-deck coaches. From 2019 onwards, the bilevel Stadler KISS (known as DOSTO in Sweden) has also been used in the Mälardalen and Uppsala regions of Sweden, and since 2023, Tåg i Bergslagen has operated the same train sets in the Bergslagen region.

Among crew and technical support the vehicle early got nicknamed "Flodhäst", in English "Hippo - big, gray and unpredictable". The X40 is currently being refurbished which will modernise the double-deckers so that they can last for about 15 more years.

== Specifications ==
The double deckers have a little higher passenger capacity than conventional cars, with 85 compared to 78 seats. Wider doors allow the trains to make only 30 second stops in smaller stations and 60 second stops in larger stations. Top speed is 200 km/h (125 mph). Often the trains are paired, with one two-car and one three-car unit. The X40 has both first and second class, but with the same level of comfort. There is air conditioning, signal boosting for mobile telephones, electrical plugs at each chair, that is also equipped with radio. WLAN is available for free to all passengers.

There were many technical problems during the first year of operation in 2006, including problems with doors and the air conditioning. Complaints from passengers were that there was too little room for baggage and that the seat pitch was insufficient. These problems have been addressed through rebuilding the interior, which also included removing all vending machines and coffeemakers from the trains themselves. The trains are specified for regional commuter traffic, and some complaints come from passengers on longer journeys. For example, a common route for the train is Gävle-Stockholm-Linköping, with stop at Arlanda Airport, which means that tourists with heavy luggage use the train. During 2011 they have been used for even longer distances, like Stockholm-Örebro-Göteborg and Stockholm-Sundsvall, which has added to these complaints. In 2012, the new SJ 3000 have replaced the X40 on the Stockholm-Sundsvall line.

== Refurbishment ==
X40 trainsets will be refurbished in 2024–2028 by Finnish VR FleetCare in Oulu and Pieksämäki. This refurbishment will modernise the double-deckers so that they can last for about 15 more years. The seats will be refurbished and get new fabric to make cleaning easier. The train sets will also get new lighting and an update of the passenger information system. The trains will be repainted. The 1st class compartment will be more comfortable but will retain its 2+2 seating, some of the four groups with tables will be removed to allow for more seats with sitting together and fewer with sitting opposite each other. It has not yet been decided whether coffee/vending machines will be reintroduced on the trains, something that was previously available on board.

The 27 X40 trainsets with three carriages (X40-3) will be refurbished between 2024 and 2028. SJ has an option to rebuild the 15 X40 trainsets with two carriages (X40-2). As of September 2026, 14 out of the 27 three carriages trainsets had been refurbished.

== Image gallery ==
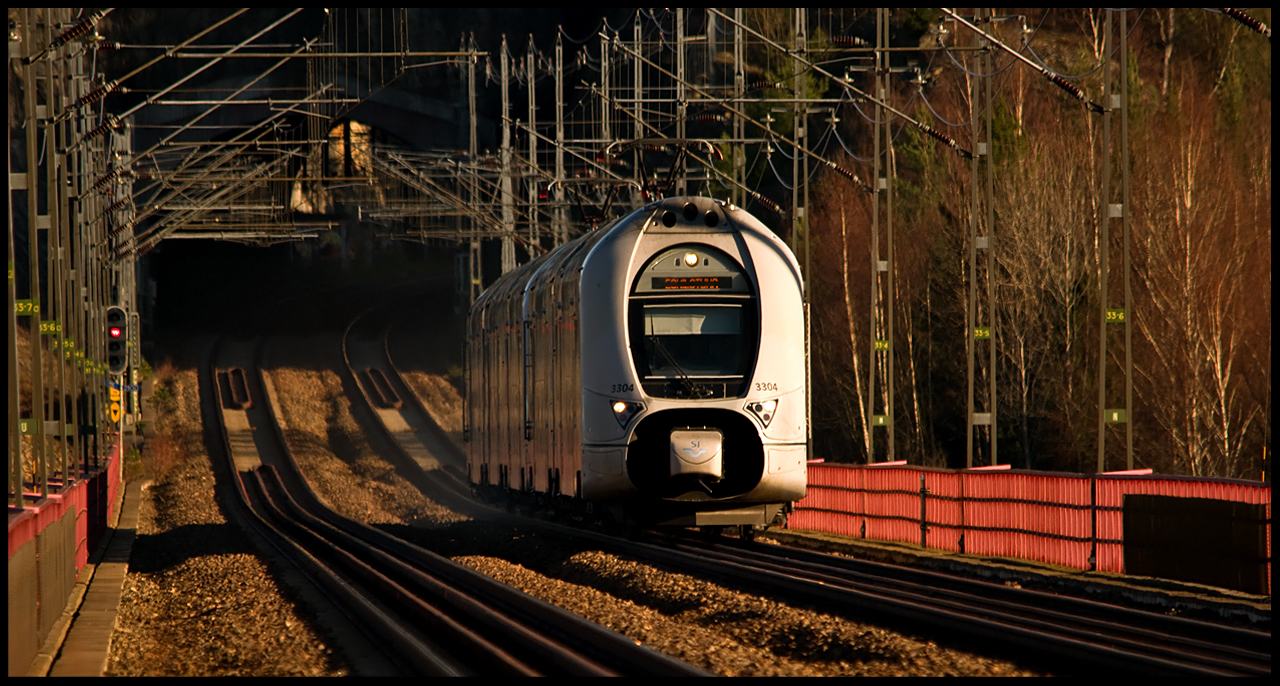
X40 train at Läggesta, March 2012

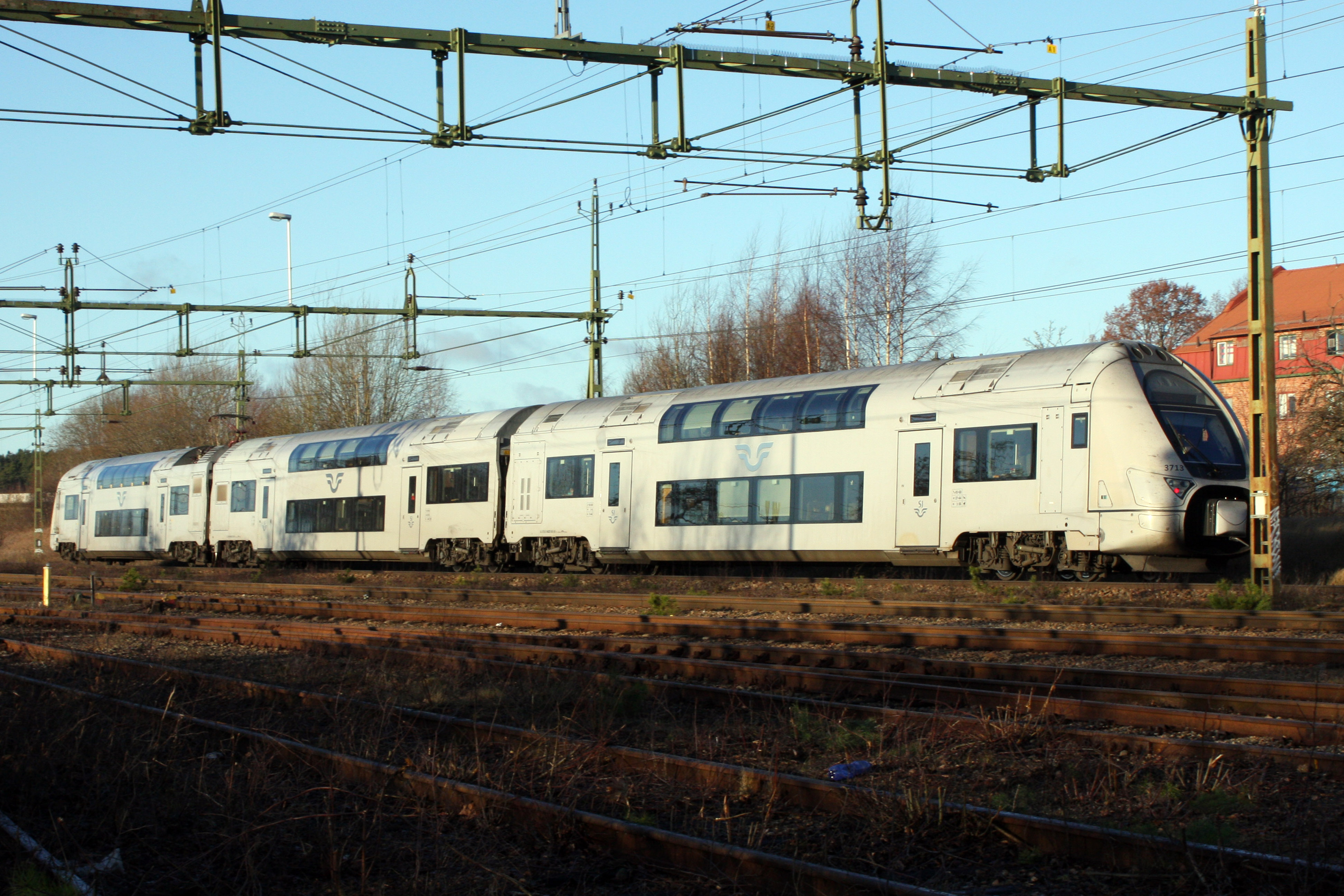
A X40 in Nyköping

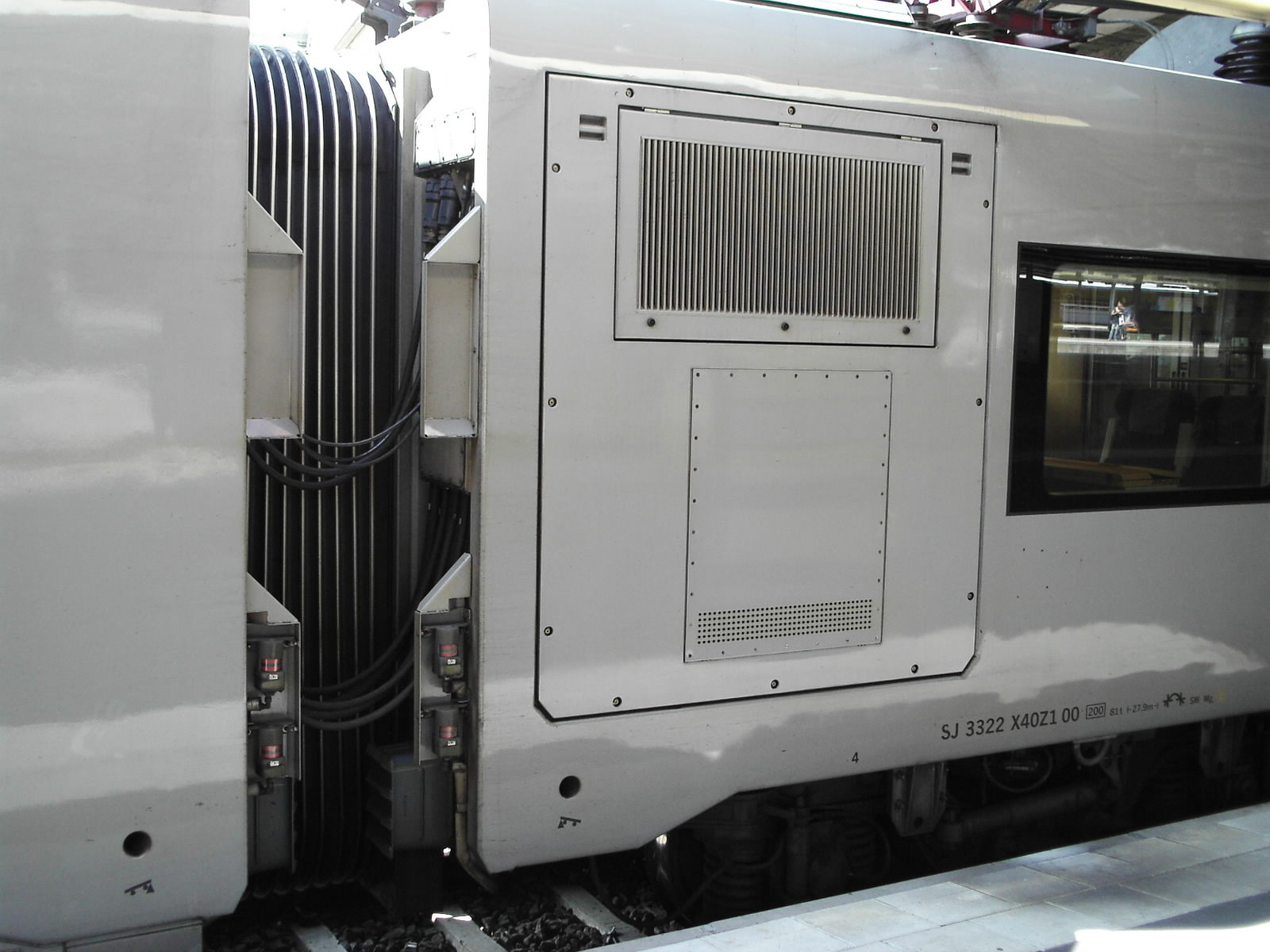
Fixed coupling of two carriages in the X40 train
