= SJ Y3 =

Y3
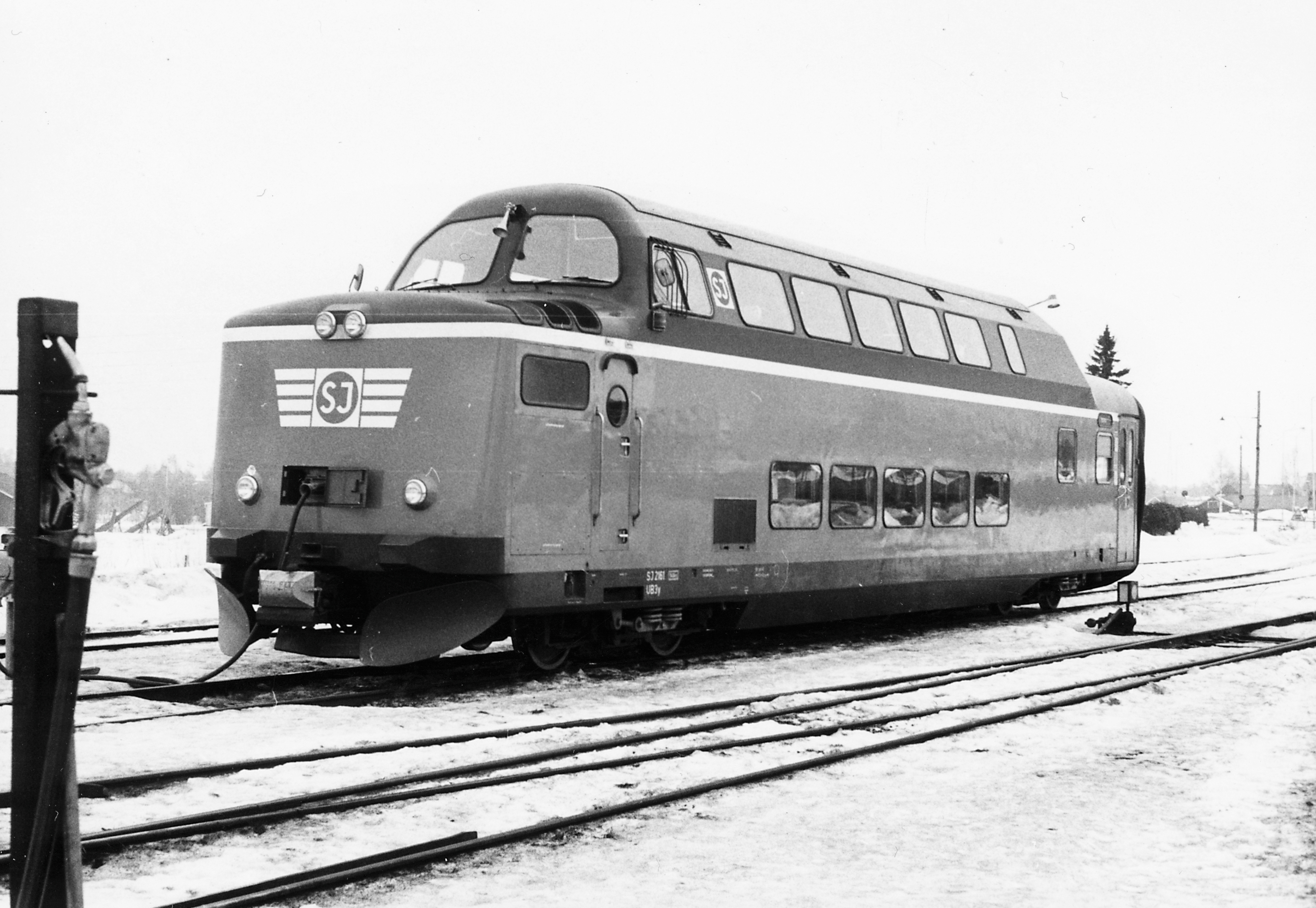
- UB3Y 2161
- In service: 1966–1990
- Manufacturers: ASEA, Linke-Hofmann
- Constructed: 1966–1967
- Number built: 6
- Fleet numbers: 1261–1266
- Operator: Statens Järnvägar

Specifications
- Car length: 19,620 mm (64 ft 4.4 in) (motor units); 21,000 mm (68 ft 10.8 in) (trailer)
- Maximum speed: 140 km/h (87 mph)
- Weight: 61.9 t (60.9 long tons; 68.2 short tons)
- Prime mover: Deutz AG
- Power output: 910 kW (1,220 hp)
- Track gauge: 1,435 mm (4 ft 8 1/2 in)

Y3 was a series of diesel railcars operated by Statens Järnvägar (SJ) of Sweden. Six units were delivered by Linke-Hofmann of Germany in 1966–67, with electrical equipment supplied by ASEA. They remained in service until 1990, serving first on the unelectrified services Stockholm – Mora and Malmö – Karlskrona, later on Ystadbanan.

The Y3 served the same purpose as the electric X9-series. A variation of configurations was used, with the production consisting of six motor cars, two cab cars and eleven trailers. With motor cars on each end the Y3 could have six trailers between. Although considered to be the first double-decker train used in Sweden, only the first and last cars of a Y3 train were built to a design somewhat resembling a dome car, whereas the middle coaches were all single-decker (unlike in the X40 and Stadler DOSTO). The series was prone to fires, since the cooling system didn't work sufficiently for the extremely powerful Deutz diesel engines introduced in place of the slower and less powerful Rolls-Royce engines. This was solved through rebuilding the cooling system in the 1970s. Some of the bilevel rail cars were taken out of service in 1982 when the Y3 series was relegated to local traffic on the Malmö – Ystad – Tomelilla route, with the last Y3 coaches retired in 1990.
