= Mjøndalen Station =

Railway station in Drammen, Norway

Mjøndalen
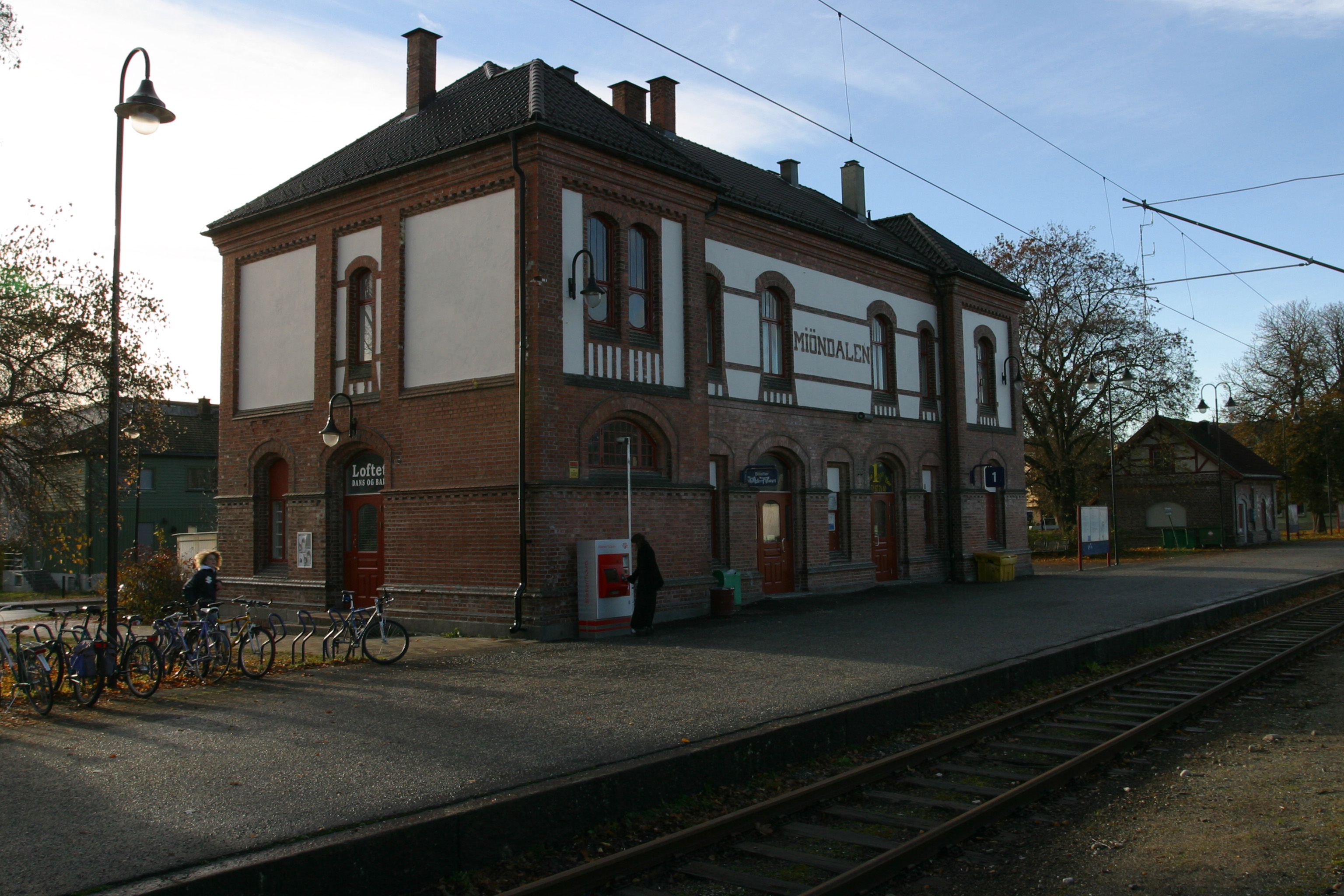

General information
- Location: Mjøndalen, Nedre Eiker; Norway
- Coordinates: 59°45′3.1788″N 10°0′43.740″E
- Elevation: 5.2 m (17 ft) AMSL
- Owner: Bane NOR
- Operator: Vy
- Line: Sørlandet Line
- Distance: 70.22 km (43.63 mi)
- Platforms: 1

History
- Opened: 1866
Location

Mjøndalen Station (Norwegian: Mjøndalen stasjon) is located at the village of Mjøndalen in Nedre Eiker, Norway on the Sørlandet Line. Traditionally, this section of railway was regarded as part of the Randsfjorden Line. The station is served by local trains between Kongsberg via Oslo to Eidsvoll operated by Vy. The station was opened in 1866.

| Preceding station | | | Following station |
|---|---|---|---|
| Hokksund | Sørlandet Line | | Gulskogen |
| Preceding station | Local trains | | Following station |
| Hokksund | R12 | Kongsberg–Oslo S–Eidsvoll | Gulskogen |
