= SJ Y6 =

1953–1991 diesel railcar series

Y6/Y7/Y8
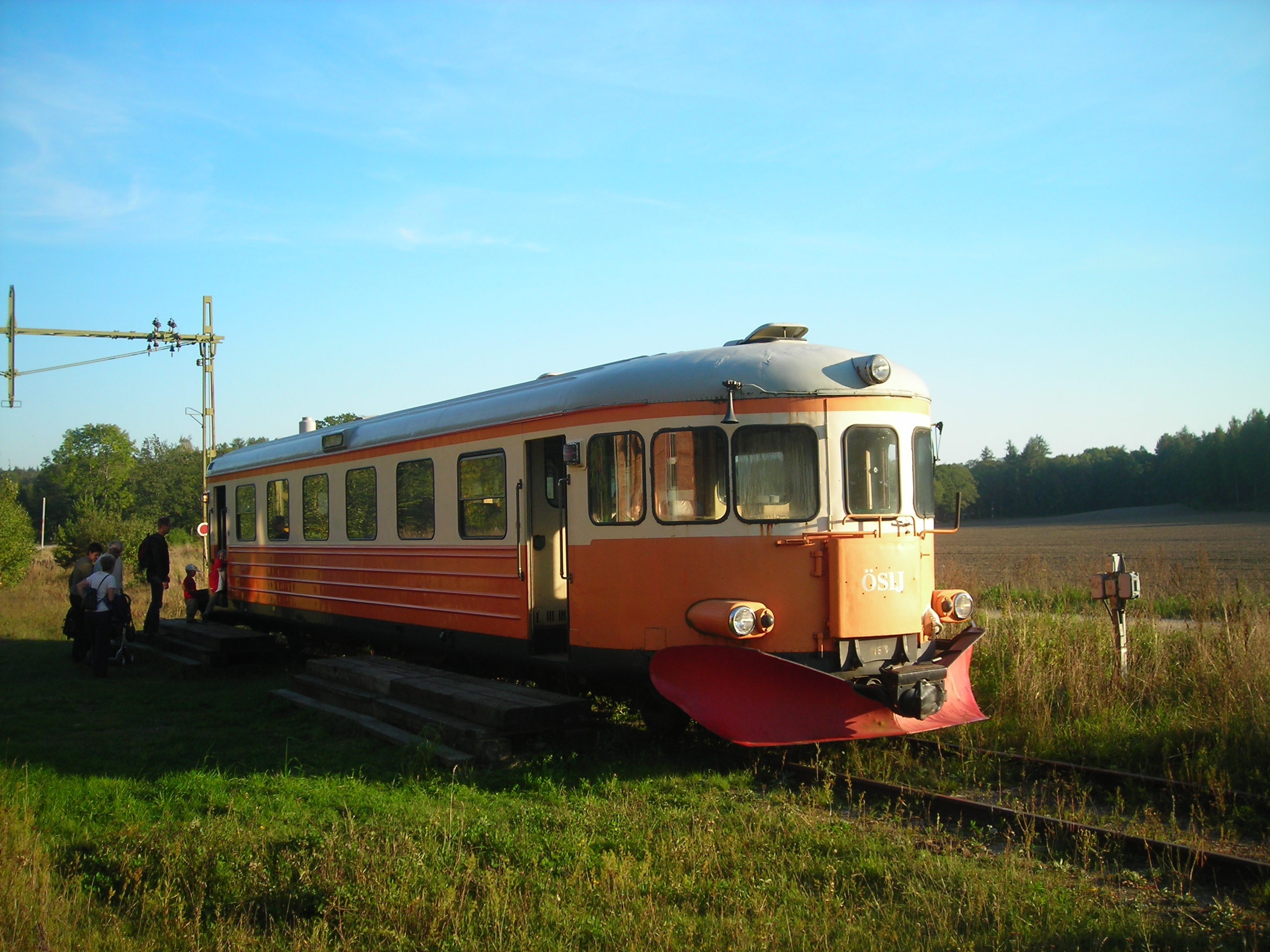
- Y7 railcar
- In service: 1953–1991
- Manufacturers: Hägglund & Söner; Svenska Järnvägsverkstäderna; Kalmar Mekaniska Verkstad; Eksjöverken
- Constructed: 1953–1961
- Number built: 251 (Y6); 122 (Y7); 5 (GSJ); 321 (trailers)
- Capacity: 53 (Y6); 47 (Y7); 36 (Y8)
- Operator: Swedish State Railways & Norwegian State Railway

Specifications
- Car length: 17,550 mm (57 ft 6.9 in) (motor units); 17,100 mm (56 ft 1.2 in) (trailer)
- Maximum speed: 115 km/h (71 mph)
- Weight: 19 t (19 long tons; 21 short tons) (motor cars); 14 t (14 long tons; 15 short tons) (trailer)
- Power output: 145 kW (194 hp)
- Track gauge: 1,435 mm (4 ft 8 1/2 in)

Y6 was a series of diesel railcars operated by Statens Järnvägar (SJ) of Sweden. 378 motor cars and 321 trailers were delivered between 1953-61 by Hägglund & Söner, Svenska Järnvägsverkstäderna, Kalmar Mekaniska Verkstad and Eksjöverken. They were used throughout the unelectrified Swedish rail network during the 1950s to the 1980s. The electrical counterpart of the unit was the X16 and X17.

In addition to SJ, five units were sold to Göteborg-Särö Järnväg in 1954.

In 1981 five units were sold from SJ to the Norwegian State Railways, where they were designated NSB Class 89 and used on the Flekkefjord Line. In Sweden the units were replaced by the Y1 railcars in the 1980s.

One Y7 unit, 1212, was preserved in the UK in 1985, and is now operated by The International Railway Preservation Society. It has been returned to working order and following a move back to the Nene Valley Railway won the Railcar Associations Railcar of the Year Award 2012.

== Variations ==
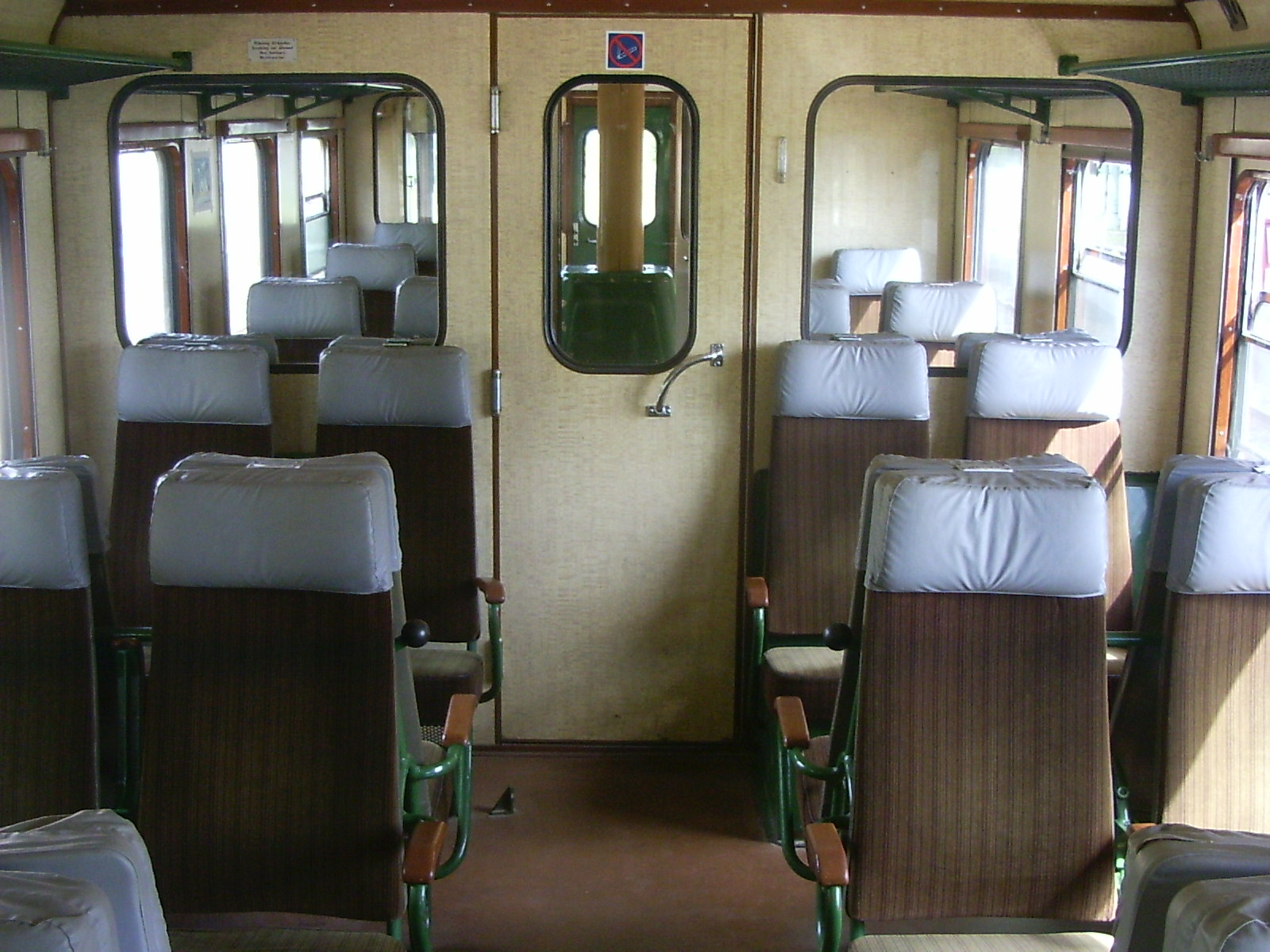
Interior of a Y7 unit

Y6 was the original version, delivered 1953-57 and in 251 copies. It has smaller and simpler seats, with five-abreast, totalling 53 places. They were built by Hägglunds, ASJ and Kalmar. The last one left service in 1983, but many were rebuilt as service cars for railway maintenance. Some are still (2008) used for that. 26 cars were also sold to Danish private railways.

Y7 has fewer and taller seats than the Y6, with four-abreast seating and 47 seats in total. 122 were built between 1957 and 1960 at ASJ and Eksjöverken. In addition seven Y6 and Y8 were rebuilt to Y7. Five were sold to NSB and one to a Danish private railway. It was in service with SJ until 1989.

Y8 was a faster version used in Central Sweden, with the same interior as the X9. They were rebuilt from Y6 and 29 units had their seating reduced from 53 to 36 seats. Some of these have been preserved.

X16 and X17 are electric versions of the Y6 and Y7.

== In Norway ==
In 1981, NSB was in need of new rolling stock for the Flekkefjord Line. The line had been using Class 87 units, but these were so old they needed to be retired. NSB had sufficient Class 86 units, but these were suboptimal for the line. The Flekkefjord Line had originally been built as a narrow gauge railway, and when it was converted to standard gauge, the profile was not expanded. At first NSB borrowed two Y7 units from SJ, which arrived to Norway on 23 January 1981 and were put into service on 24 February. They proved reliable and suitable, and NSB purchased them for SEK 95,000 each plus freight in April. NSB gave them the class number 89 and road numbers 01 and 02. Two more units were sold to NSB in 1986. They retained the SJ colour scheme, but received the NSB logo. In the last few year, car 03 was used for parts. The Flekkefjord Line was closed on 31 December 1990. Two of the cars were proposed taken over by a private company, Continental Railways Systems, founded by Rasmus Rasmussen (Rasmus Surdal). They received a white paint job but the private operations were never realized. Unit 04 was then sent to the Ofoten Line as a work car. Three of the units have been preserved.
