= Kragerø Station =

Railway station in Kragerø, Norway

Kragerø
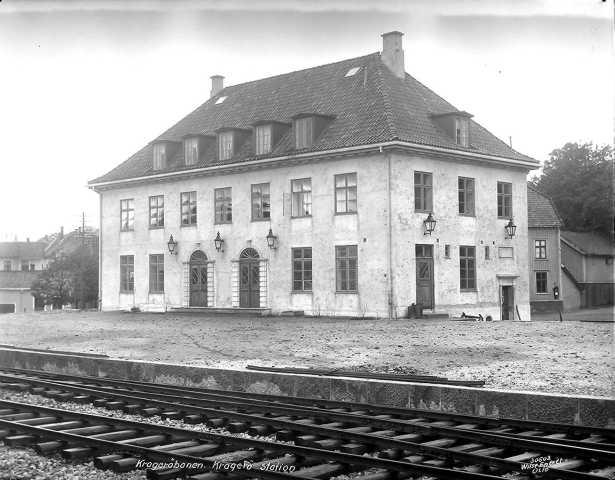

General information
- Location: Kragerø, Kragerø Municipality; Norway
- Coordinates: 58°52′10″N 09°24′53″E
- Owner: Norwegian State Railways
- Line: Kragerø Line
- Distance: 247.38 km (153.71 mi)
- Platforms: 2

History
- Opened: 2 December 1927
Location
- Location within Telemark Location within Norway

Kragerø Station (Norwegian: Kragerø stasjon) was a railway station located on the Kragerø Line in the town of Kragerø in Kragerø Municipality, Norway.

== History ==
The station was opened on 2 December 1927, when the Sørlandet Line was opened to Kragerø from Lunde Station. The station was the terminus of the Sørlandet Line, but after the extension of the line from Neslandsvatn to Nelaug, it became a branch line. Traffic was terminated in 1989. By 1994, the station was used as a parking lot.

The station building was finished in 1925, and it was designed by Gudmund Hoel and Eivind Gleditsch. In 2020, the building was sold by the municipal council to the non-profit organisation Sparebankstiftelsen DNB.

| Preceding station | | Following station |
|---|---|---|
| — | Kragerø Line | Kallstadkilen |
