= Gulskogen =

Borough of Drammen, Norway

- Area
- Interactive map of Gulskogen
- Coordinates: 59°44′45″N 10°09′51″E
- Buskerud: Norway
- Time zone: UTC+01:00 (CET)

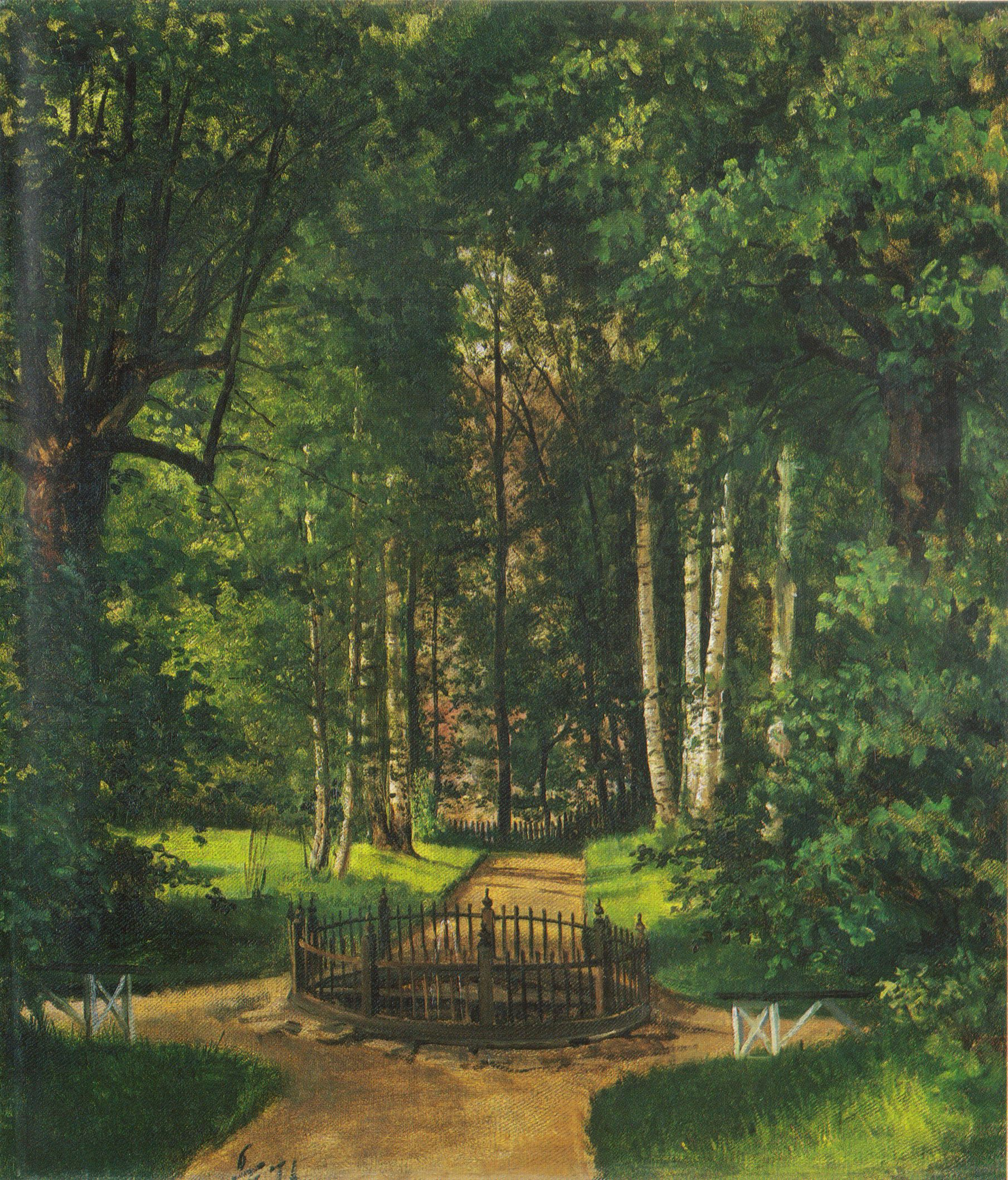
Fra Gulskogen Peter Nicolai Arbo (1871)

Gulskogen is a borough in Drammen, Buskerud, Norway. Gulskogen has a population of 3,856 inhabitants (2005). Strømsgodset was the name of the parish from early times. Strømsgodset was a separate municipality which in 1964 became part of Drammen. The district takes its name from the historic Gulskogen Manor (Gulskogen gård).

The Gulskogen farm represents one of the best preserved examples of late 18th and early 19th century Norwegian farms. The facility consists of a garden, farm buildings and a manor house. Today the farm is part of the Drammen Museum.
