= TGOJ X20 =

X20
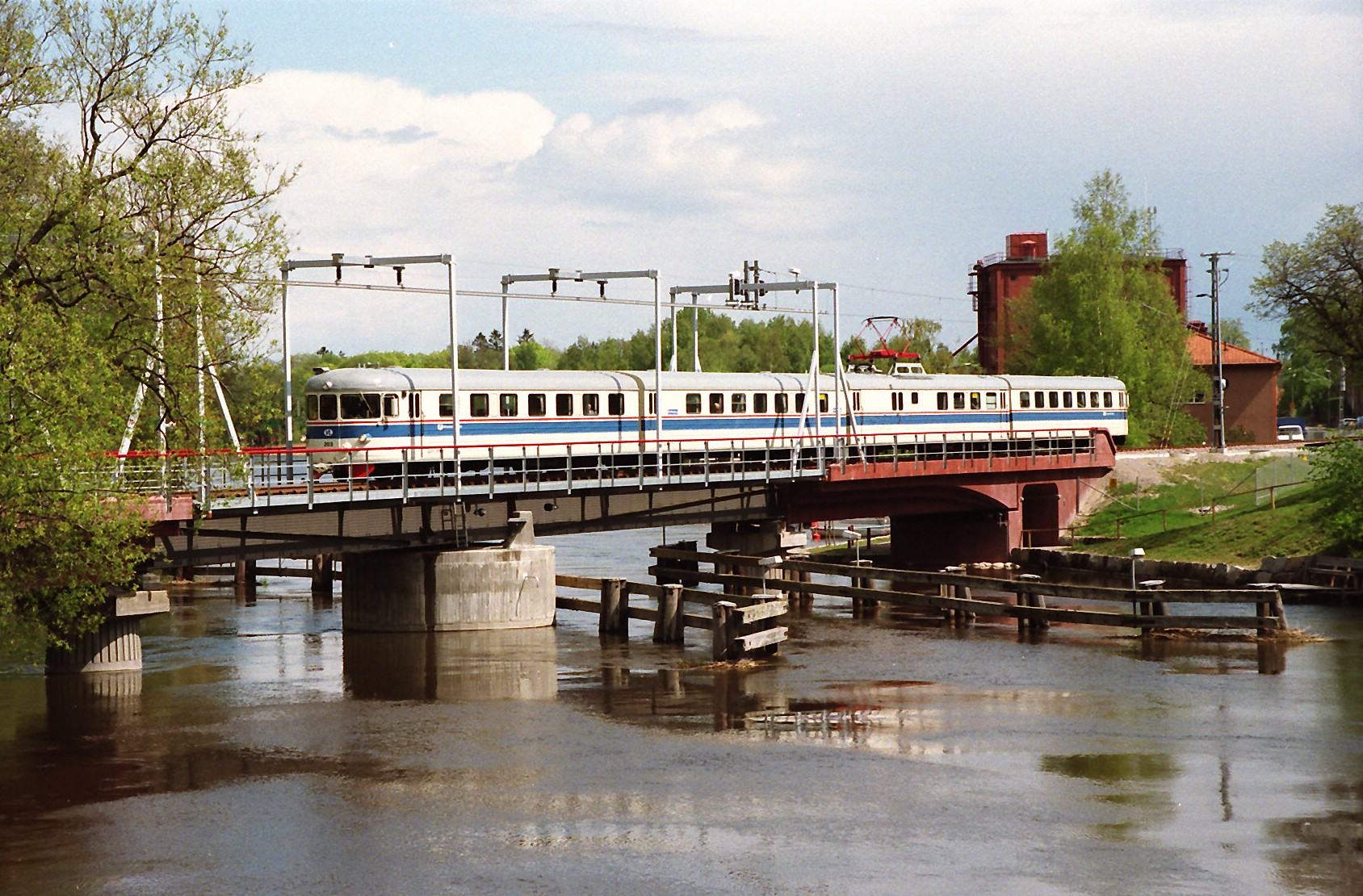
- X20 in the colours of Västmanlands Lokaltrafik in 1997.
- In service: 1956 - 2009
- Manufacturer: Hilding Carlsson
- Constructed: 1956-1959
- Number built: 13
- Formation: Four cars (X20); Two cars (X21, X22); Three cars (X23)
- Operators: Trafikaktiebolaget Grängesberg-Oxelösunds Järnvägar

Specifications
- Train length: 65.54 m (215 ft 0 in) (X20); 33.14 m (108 ft 9 in) (X21, X22); 48.67 m (159 ft 8 in) (X23)
- Maximum speed: 105 km/h (65 mph)
- Weight: 68.7 t (67.6 long tons; 75.7 short tons) (X20); 35 t (34 long tons; 39 short tons) (X21, X22); 54.5 t (53.6 long tons; 60.1 short tons) (X23)
- Power output: 340 kW (460 hp) (X20, X23); 170 kW (230 hp) (X21, X22)
- Electric system(s): 15 kV 16.7 Hz AC catenary
- Current collection: Pantograph
- Track gauge: 1,435 mm (4 ft 8 1/2 in)

X20, X21, X22 and X23 was a series of two to four car electric multiple units operated by Trafikaktiebolaget Grängesberg-Oxelösunds Järnvägar (TGOJ) of Sweden. Thirteen units were built by Hilding Carlssons Mekaniska Verkstad in 1956–59. One unit was sold to Tågkompaniet in 2001 and was the last unit in service after 2003 until it was taken out of service in 2009. The SJ X9 EMUs were partly derived from this type.

== History ==
The X20-series was in service with TGOJ until 1989 when they were transferred to Statens Järnvägar (SJ) as a consequence of SJ buying TGOJ. Most of the units retained the TGOJ livery, though some were redecorated to SJs blue colors. During the 1990s they were taken out of service, the last leaving in 2001. One X20 and the X23 were for a period in service with Storstockholms Lokaltrafik on the Stockholm commuter rail. Another X20 was sold to Tågkompaniet, and was the only in traffic after 2003. And was taken out of traffic in 2009, though one of the cars has been removed to improve acceleration. Many units from the X20 family are preserved at Grängesbergsbanornas Järnvägsmuseum (GBBJ)

== Versions ==
- X20 built as three four-car sets.
- X21 is the other original series, and built as ten two car sets, with a less powerful motor.
- X22 was the result of four X21-units being rebuilt in the 1980s with a more spacious interior and more first class seating.
- X23 was created in 1991 after a number of accidents had put parts of the stock out of commission. It had three cars, but the same power as a X20 unit.
