= NSB Class 87 =

Class of Norwegian diesel-hydraulic railcars

- In service: 1941–1981
- Manufacturer: Strømmen
- Constructed: 1941, 1952
- Number under construction: 25
- Formation: 1 or 2 cars
- Fleet numbers: 87.01–08; 87.65–81
- Capacity: 59
- Operator: Norwegian State Railways

Specifications
- Car length: 14,000 mm (550 in)
- Maximum speed: 75 km/h (47 mph)
- Weight: 15.0 t (14.8 long tons; 16.5 short tons)
- Prime movers: Deutz A6M517(A); Scania-Vabis D802(B)
- Power output: 93 kW (125 hp) (A); 112 kW (150 hp) (B)
- Track gauge: 1,435 mm (4 ft 8 1/2 in)

NSB Class 87 (Norwegian: NSB type 87) is a class of 25 diesel-hydraulic railcars built by Strømmens Værksted for the Norwegian State Railways. Seventeen a-series units were delivered in 1941 and equipped with 93-kilowatt (125 hp) Deutz prime mover. Eight b-series units were delivered in 1952 and equipped with 110-kilowatt (150 hp) Scania-Vabis prime movers. The trains weighed 15 and 15.5 tonnes (14.8 and 15.3 long tons; 16.5 and 17.1 short tons) and had a maximum speed of 75 and 80 kilometres per hour (47 and 50 mph), respectively for the a and b-series. They were used on many branch lines until the 1960s, when the gradual electrification caused most lines instead to be served with Class 86. The a-series was scrapped in 1972 and 1973, while the b-series remained used between Ål and Hønefoss on the Bergen Line until 1975 and on the Flekkefjord Line until 1981.

== Specifications ==
Class 87 is a single-car railcar with seating for 46 people plus 11 folding seats. The cars have an overall length of 14.8 meters (48 ft 7 in) and a body length of 14.0 meters (45 ft 11 in). The class was equipped with a diesel-hydraulic transmission. The a-series is equipped with a Deutz A6M517 engine, which gives a power output of 93 kilowatts (125 hp). The b-series has a Scania-Vabis D802 prime mover with a power output of 110 kilowatts (150 hp). The higher power gave the b-series a maximum speed of 80 kilometers per hour (50 mph), compared to the 75 kilometers per hour (47 mph) of the a-series. However, this also have the b-series a 15.5 tonnes (15.3 long tons; 17.1 short tons) weight, compared to the a-series 15 tonnes (15 long tons; 17 short tons).

== History ==
The class was ordered for NSB to have a class of smaller railbuses for lines with little traffic. Seventeen units were delivered in 1941, and were originally numbered 18.265–281 and designated Class 7a. Another eight units, the b-series, were delivered in 1952 and numbered 18.301–308. The class was later renumbered Class 87. The trains were used both on mainline routes with little traffic and on branch lines. As the railway network was gradually electrified during the 1950s and 1960s, the need for railcars dropped. Branch line service could easily be handled by the larger and more comfortable Class 86 and 91, and from the late 1960s Class 87 was taken out of use. NSB attempted to sell the units, but as no-one was interested in purchasing them, they were scrapped in 1972 and 1973.

The b-series remained in service on the local service between Ål and Hønefoss on the Bergen Line, but was taken out of service in the mid-1970s. Also the Flekkefjord Line retained the b-series, which was used until 1981, when it was replaced with Class 89. The last six trains were retired on 4 March 1981. No. 87-01 and 03 have been preserved by the Norwegian Railway Club.
