= SJ X9 =

X9
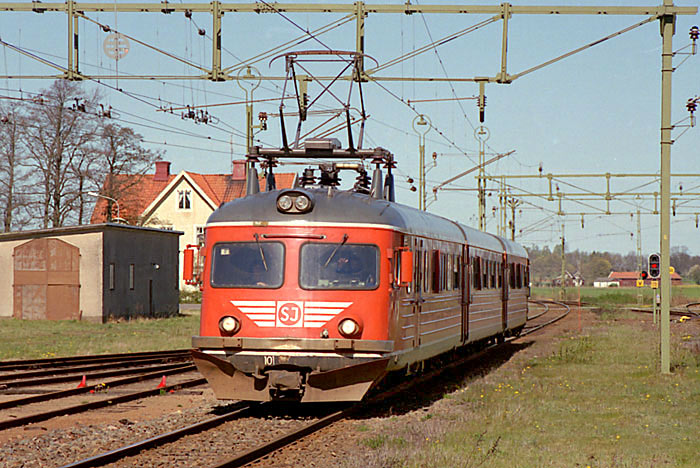
- SJ X9 No. 101 at Håkantorp
- In service: 1960–1999
- Manufacturer: Hilding Carlsson
- Constructed: 1959–1963
- Number built: 23
- Formation: 4-car sets
- Fleet numbers: 101–145
- Operators: Statens Järnvägar

Specifications
- Train length: 69,800 mm (229 ft 0 in)
- Car length: Motor cars: 17,500 mm (57 ft 5.0 in), Trailer cars: 17,400 mm (57 ft 1.0 in)
- Maximum speed: 115 km/h (71 mph)
- Weight: 103 tonnes (101 long tons; 114 short tons)
- Traction system: 40 kN (8,992 lbf)
- Power output: 340 kW (456 hp)
- Electric system(s): 15 kV 16.7 Hz AC catenary
- Current collector(s): Pantograph
- AAR wheel arrangement: (1A)′(A1)′+2′2′+2′2′+(1A)′(A1)′
- Track gauge: 1,435 mm (4 ft 8 1/2 in)

X9 is a series of four-car electric multiple units operated by Statens Järnvägar (SJ) of Sweden as express trains. Twenty-three were built by Hilding Carlssons Mekaniska Verkstad between 1960–1963 and were in service with SJ until 1999. The sharp reddish orange colour gave the trains the nickname Paprika trains.

== History ==
The X9 was partially based on the X20/X21-series delivered by Hilding Carlsson to the private company TGOJ. The X9 was put into service in Southern Sweden and from Stockholm to Dalarna. During the 1970s all the units were moved to either Skåne or to the Gothenburg area, and during the 1980s all units were moved to the latter area.
