= NSB Class 86 =

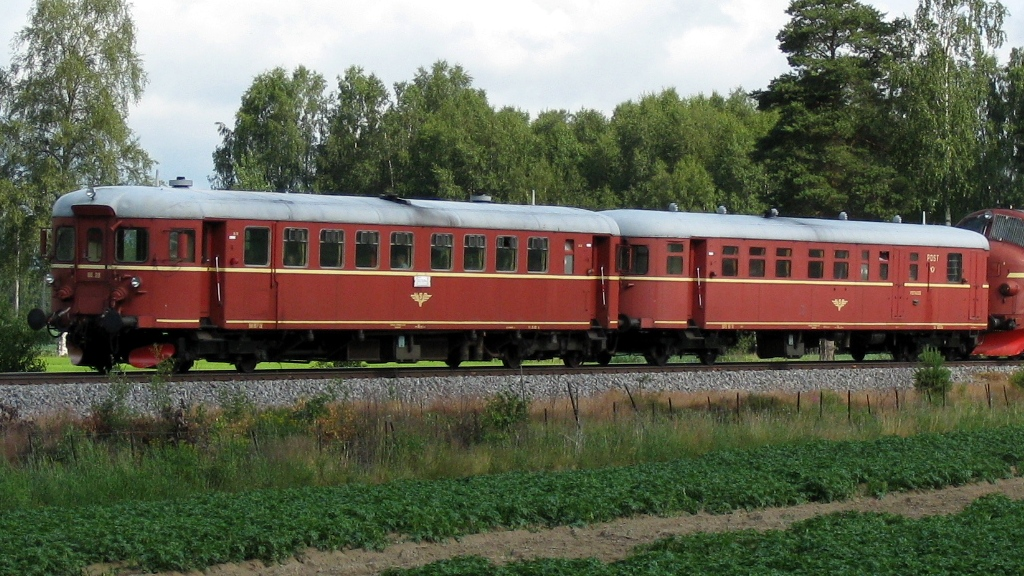
- A heritage Class 86 on the Solør Line
- In service: 1938–1996
- Manufacturer: Strømmen
- Constructed: 1938–1954 (Class 86); 1954–1956 (Class 91)
- Number built: 38 (Class 86); 10 (Class 91)
- Formation: 1 or 2 cars
- Capacity: 48–70
- Operators: Norwegian State Railways

Specifications
- Car length: 21,500 mm (70 ft 6 in)
- Maximum speed: 100 km/h (62 mph)
- Weight: 30.5 t (30.0 long tons; 33.6 short tons)
- Prime mover(s): 2 × Rolls-Royce C6SFLH
- Power output: 312 kW (418 hp)
- Track gauge: 1,435 mm (4 ft 8 1/2 in)

NSB Class 86 (Norwegian: NSB type 86) is a class of diesel-hydraulic multiple units built by Strømmens Værksted for the Norwegian State Railways (NSB). Thirty-eight motor cars and thirty-one trailers were built between 1937 and 1954, split between six subtypes designated a through f. Class 91 was a further delivery of ten units that had a more comfortable interior and were designed for regional trains. The trains had good acceleration and a maximum speed of 100 kilometres per hour (62 mph), which made them suitable for most unelectrified lines in Norway. As most of the network gradually became electrified, the class became increasingly used on branch lines.

The oldest units were originally equipped with MAN and DWK prime movers. Later models received prime moves from Hercules. From the 1960s, all trains not retired received two Rolls-Royce C6SFLH engines with a power output of 158 kilowatts (212 hp) each. The class was taken out of regular service in 1994 and retired in 1996. Thirteen motor units and nine trailers have been preserved by various heritage railways and museums in Norway and Denmark.

== Specifications ==
The oldest units were equipped with Maschinenfabrik Augsburg-Nürnberg (MAN) and DWK prime movers. The DWK engines in the a and c-series had a power output of 138 kilowatts (185 hp) each. The MAN engine in the b-series had a power output of 110 kilowatts (150 hp) each, while the d-series with DWK engines had a power output of 150 horsepower (110 kW) each. Later editions were originally equipped with two Hercules DFXH-F prime movers, each with a power output of 140 kilowatts (190 hp). The class was later retrofitted with two Rolls-Royce C6SFLH with a power output of 158 kilowatts (212 hp). The class had a diesel-hydraulic transmission, with fluid converters originally from Atlas. They had a weight of 30.5 tonnes (30.0 long tons; 33.6 short tons) and a maximum speed of 100 kilometres per hour (62 mph).

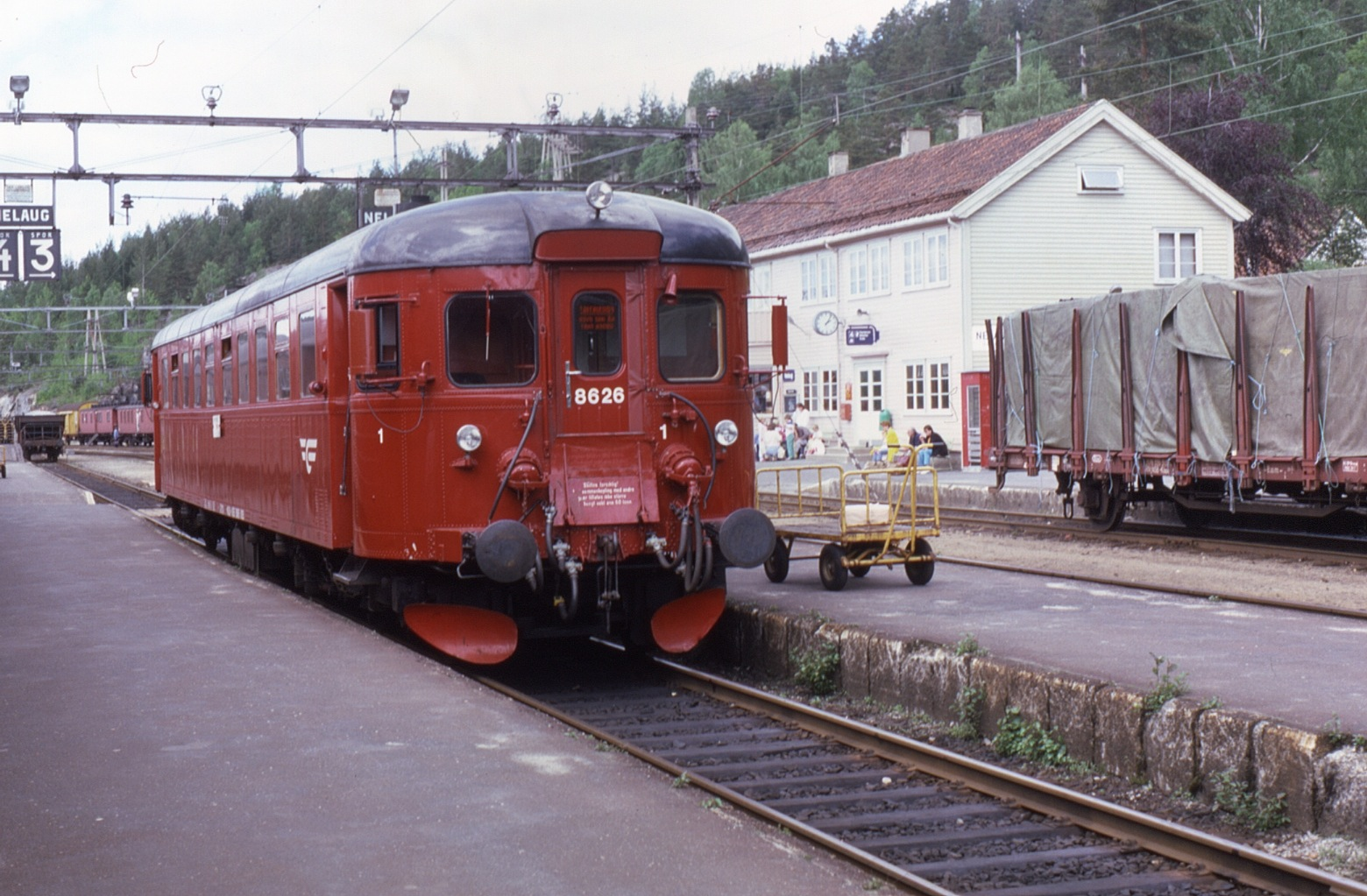
Unit 8626 at Nelaug Station in 1986

Standard seating in a Class 86 unit is for 70 people in five-abreast seating plus six people in folding seats. As the class was gradually renovated and rebuilt, a new lettering scheme was introduced, where the letter indicated the unit's seating configuration. 86F had reversible backs, 86G had adjustable seating, while 86 K, L and M had fixed seats with high backs. The G-series had only 49 regular plus six folding seats. In the 1980s, the trains remaining in service were renovated and became the M-series. These had 60 regular and six folding seats with fixed backs. Class 91 had only four-abreast seating with a capacity for 64 regular and 6 folding seats, and was made for longer journeys.

== History ==
Class 86 is based on a delivery of ten aluminum carriages by Strømmen to NSB in 1936 and 1938. Following their success, NSB took delivery of a series of motor units. The first three units were delivered in 1938; one with DWK engine (no. 43) and two with engines from MAN (no. 44–45). The former was designated the a-series, the latter the b-series. A further ten units were delivered in 1940, split between the c and d-series (no. 50–53 and 54–59). Six carriages were delivered in 1943 and 1944. Because of lack of reserve parts to the DWK engines, NSB in 1948 decided to replace them with the Hercules engines, which was completed by 1953. In 1950, NSB took delivery of five e-class units (no. 60–64), which were the first to receive Hercules engines from the start. This was followed up with twenty f-series units (no. 9–28), fourteen delivered in 1953 and six in 1954. Between 1952 and 1954, NSB also took delivery of 25 trailer units.

Class 91 was delivered as a series of ten motor cars (no. 1–10) and ten trailers, with four trailers delivered in 1954, the motor cars in 1955 and the last trailers in 1956. That year, NSB changed their numbering scheme, changing Class 6 to 86 and Class 11 to 91. Starting in 1962, NSB began replacing the prime movers with Rolls-Royce C6SFLH; this was done on the e-series, the f-series and no. 53, 55 and 57 through 59 in the d-series, as well as Class 91. The remaining units were retired. Other renovations and upgrades were made, resulting in new series; by the class' retirement, the designation had reached m.

The class featured good acceleration and high top speed, making it suitable for use on nearly all of NSB's unelectrified lines. It was used both in local, regional, feeder and intercity trains. By the 1980s, Class 86 and 91 were in need of replacement. NSB described them as neither satisfying their need for economy, comfort or speed. NSB therefore ordered 15 two-car units, Class 92, from Duewag. With the delivery of the new class, the older trains could gradually be replaced. The Arendal Line was the last to use Class 86 trains in regular service, with Class 92 being put into traffic in 1994. The last 86 and 91 trains were retired in 1996.

Thirteen motor cars and seven trailers have been preserved of Class 86, of which two motor cars are used for parts. This includes one unit at the Norwegian Railway Museum; three motor units and one trailer at stationed at Eina Station used on the heritage Valdres Line; two twin units stationed at Rise Station and used on the Arendal Line; one twin unit used on the Numedal Line and stationed at Kongsberg Station; two motor units and one trailer used by the Norwegian Railway Club, of which one is used on the heritage Krøderen Line, and one twin unit owned by the Nordic Railway Club in Denmark. Two Class 91 units have been preserved by the Norwegian Railway Club, one on the Krøderen Line and one at Marienborg.
