= Jørgen Rytterager =

Norwegian farmer (1809–1899)

Jørgen Rytterager (11 June 1809 – 17 March 1899) was a Norwegian farmer and public servant.

Born in Hole, Buskerud to a wealthy family, he married Anne Engebretsdatter Hovin (1813–1899) from Tyristrand on 23 July 1837. Rytterager became a successful farmer in Buskerud, and had various positions in public service, amongst them elector and arbitrator for Buskerud County. He nonetheless lost his fortune after a few unfortunate transactions in the summer of 1865.

When the Krøder Line, a branch line from the Randsfjord Line, was constructed in the early 1870s, Rytterager wanted to become station master at the future Snarum Station. On 14 March 1872, he sent a letter to the operations manager of the Randsfjord Line, asking for the position. He received a reply in a letter from the operations manager dated 28 September 1872, in which the manager approved Rytterager's application. He was officially appointed station master at a meeting on 26 November 1872, at the age of 63 years. His monthly salaries were 15 Norwegian speciedaler per month, as well as free accommodation, lighting and heating and a new uniform each year. The uniform consisted of a trench coat, a hat with silver badge, single-breasted dress and west with flipped collar. In 1873, it was decided that all serving station masters should have a red strip around the bottom edge of the hat, so that passengers more easily could recognize the station master.

Rytterager's duties as a station master were ticket sale, freight expedition and supervision of logging at a side track at the station. From 20 March 1873, it was possible to send telegrams from Snarum Station. Rytterager sent telegrams to Vikersund Station, in which he stated the arrival and departure dates of trains from Snarum Station. On 1 November 1873, a post office was opened at Snarum, where Rytterager was employed as post opener for customers. His salary was therefore increased from 15 to 18 speciedaler on 1 January 1874, and from 18 to 20 on 1 November 1875. After ten years in service, Rytterager retired from his positions at the station on 1 December 1882. He was succeeded by Olaus Strøm. He lived together with his wife a few years in the house of their eldest daughter, before they moved to their own house at Modum. Here, Rytterager died on 17 March 1899 after he had fallen down a stairway in their house.
