= Fiskum =

Parish in Buskerud, Norway

Coordinates: 59°41′46″N 9°48′27″E

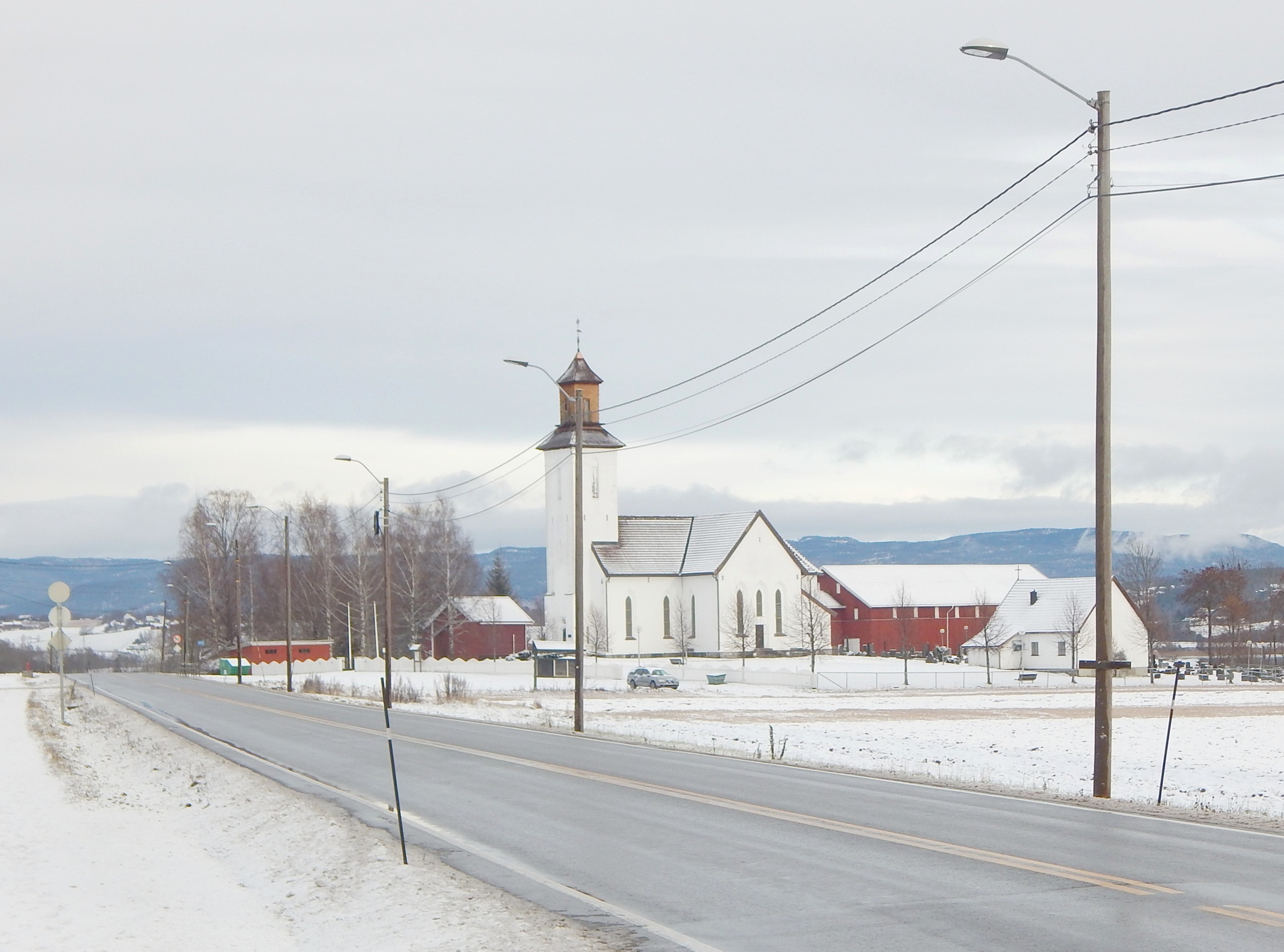
Village of Darby in Fiskum

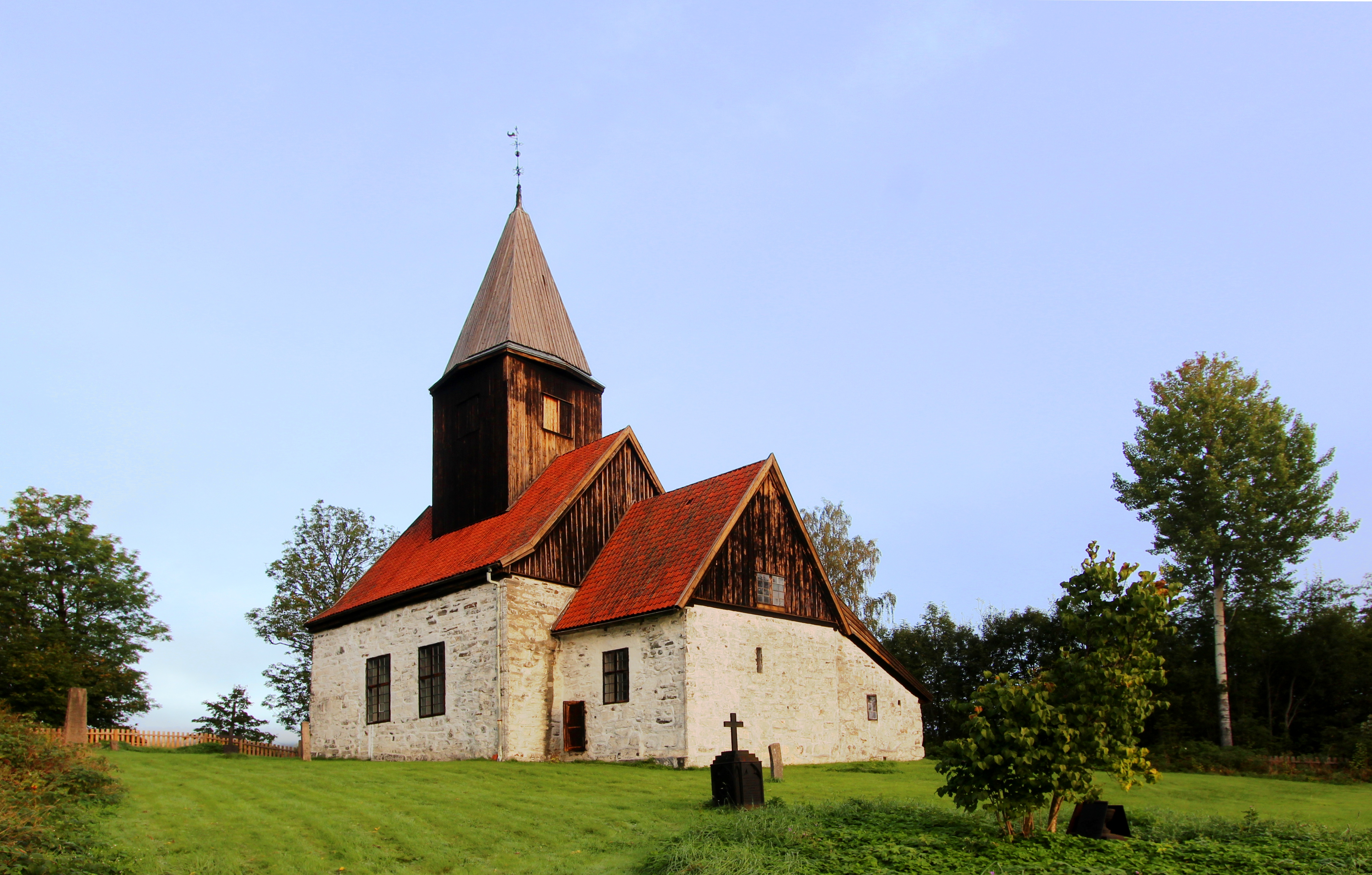
Fiskum Old Church

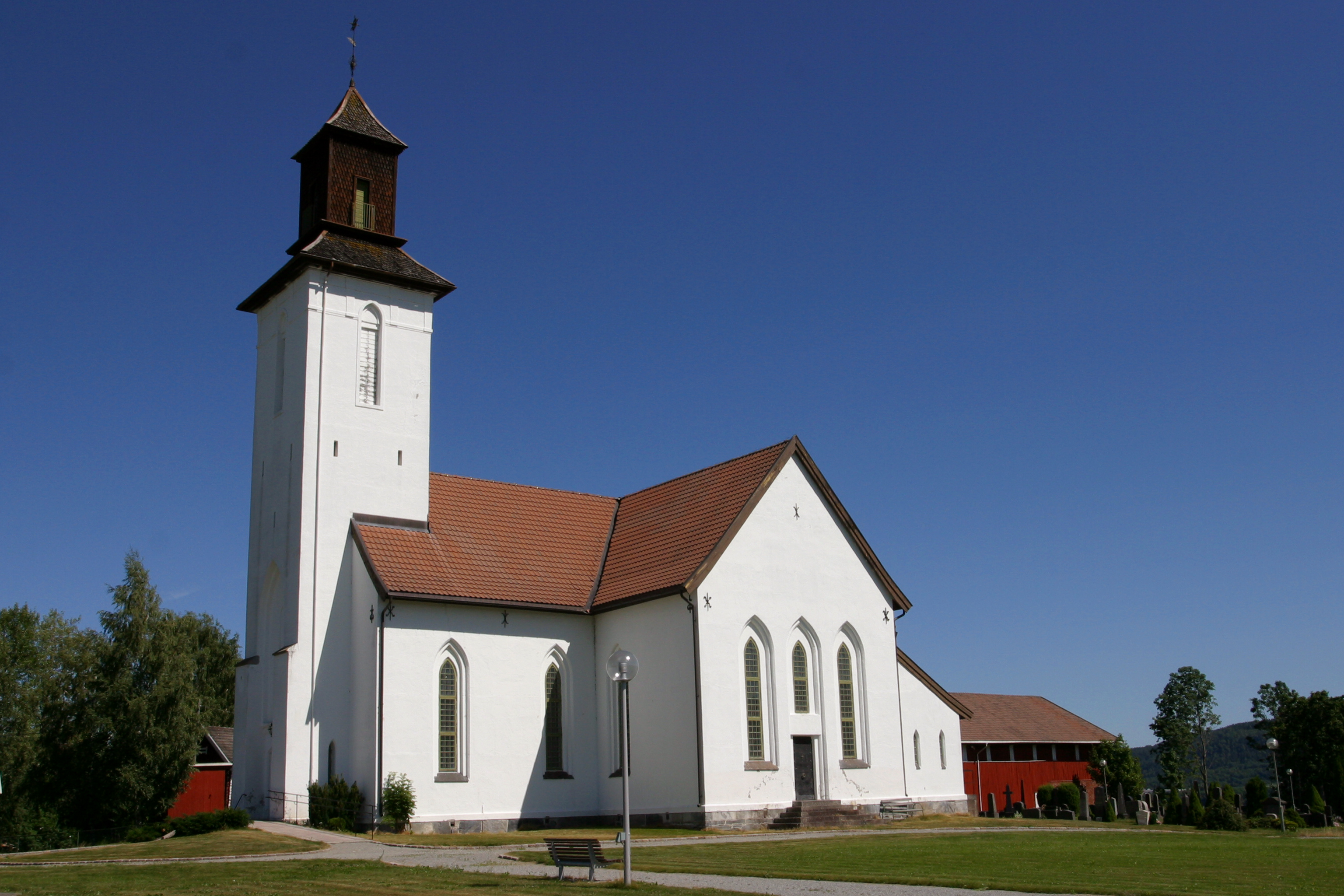
Fiskum Church

Fiskum is a parish in the municipality Øvre Eiker in Buskerud, Norway.

The parish name comes from the farm Fiskum. In the 17th century, Fiskum Manor (Fiskum gård) was a nobleman's estate. Among the owners were Governor-general Jens Hermansson Juel, Admiral Ove Gjedde and Governor-general Hannibal Sehested.

The village of Darbu is the principal settlement in the parish. This is the site of Darbu Station as well as the local post office. There are two churches in Fiskum parish.

Fiskum Old Church (Fiskum gamle kirke) was built in the 13th century in the village of Darbu. The medieval church was constructed in a rectangular shape, with a short, rectangular nave and lower and narrower, straight closed choir. The edifice is of brick and has 150 seats. The church has a gable roof, and the roof ridge, in the middle of the nave sits a turret. The church went out of active service in 1866 when it was replaced by a new church.

Fiskum Church (Fiskum kirke) was built north of Fiskum Old Church. It was designed by Heinrich Ernst Schirmer and built in 1866, but burned down in 1902. The walls were considered to be usable, and the restoration of the church were carried out according to plans prepared by architect Jørgen Berner (1873–1955). It was rebuilt in 1903 but burned down again in 1940. Architect Arnstein Arneberg designed the present church which was finished in 1945. The new church was built in cruciform form in a Gothic Revival style with a tower. Arnstein Arneberg used the ruins of the previous church, and carried several items from structure including windows and an arch over the entrance. The church has a heavy, medieval door.

== People from Fiskum ==
- Randi Thorvaldsen
- Jens Theodor Paludan Vogt
