= Snarum Station =

Railway station in Buskerud, Norway

Snarum
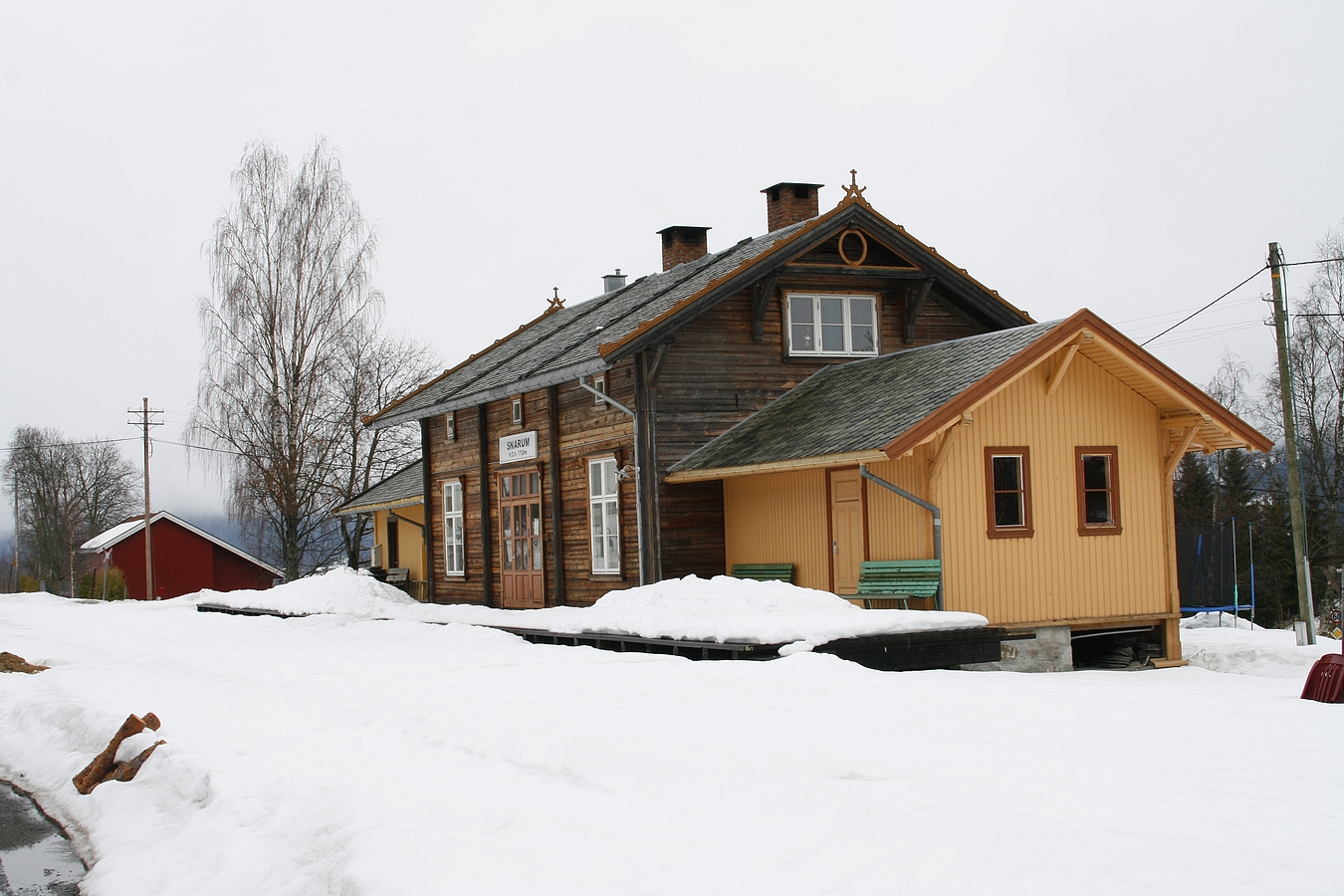
- Snarum Station

General information
- Location: Snarum, Modum; Norway
- Coordinates: 60°01′25″N 9°52′34″E
- Operator: Krøder Line Foundation
- Line: Krøder Line
- Platforms: 1

Construction
- Architect: Georg Andreas Bull

History
- Opened: 28 November 1872
- Closed: 19 January 1958 (passengers); 1 March 1985 (freight traffic)
Location

Snarum Station (originally Lofthus Station) is a railway station on the Krøder Line in Buskerud, Norway. It was opened on 28 November 1872 and located in the village Snarum. The station building was designed by Georg Andreas Bull in Swiss chalet style. On 26 November 1872, farmer Jørgen Rytterager was appointed the first station master of the station. The station was one of the stations on the Krøder Line with the most passenger and freight traffic. Passenger service was ceased on 19 January 1958, and freight traffic on 1 March 1985.

== History ==
The Krøder Line was opened on 28 November 1872 as a branch line from the Randsfjord Line. It was originally constructed as a 3 ft 6 in (1,067 mm) narrow gauge line, but converted into 1,435 mm (4 ft 8 1/2 in) standard gauge in 1909. On 14 March 1872, farmer Jørgen Rytterager (1809–1899) sent a letter to the operation manager of the Randsfjord Line, in which he applied for the station master position at the future Snarum Station. On 28 September the same year, the operation manager replied Rytterager in a letter, in which he granted him the position. A meeting was held on 26 November, where Rytterager officially was appointed station master of Snarum Station. A porter and a telegraph apprentice were also employed at the station on the same date. The station was opened two days later under the name Lofthus, but had its name changed to Snarum at some point in 1873.

Rytterager retired from his positions at the station on 1 December 1882, at the age of 73 years, and later died on 17 March 1899. He was succeeded by Olaus Strøm, who served as station master until 1893. At some point around 1900, a dairy was established at Snarum, which frequently used the station to transport milk and butter. A cement factory was started in 1919, and by 1930 there were three village shops in Snarum. This made the station one of the most frequently used stations on the Krøder Line.

Snarum Station was formally degraded from a station to a halt on 1 August 1957. On 19 January 1958, passenger traffic on the Krøder Line was stopped and replaced with bus traffic. The line was thereafter only used for freight traffic, which ceased on 1 March 1985. In 1986, the Krøder Line Foundation (Norwegian: Stiftelsen Krøderbanen) was established, which owns and maintains the track and the stations on the Krøder Line, and also operates heritage trains on Sundays.

== Facilities ==
The station house was designed by Georg Andreas Bull in Swiss chalet style. On 1 November 1873, a post office was opened at the station, with Rytterager as post opener. Since 20 March of the same year, it had been possible to send telegraphs from the station. The station building burned down in 1992, but was reconstructed after old plan drawings and finished in 1997, the year of the 125th anniversary of the Krøder Line.
