= Steinberg Station =

Railway station in Drammen, Norway

Steinberg
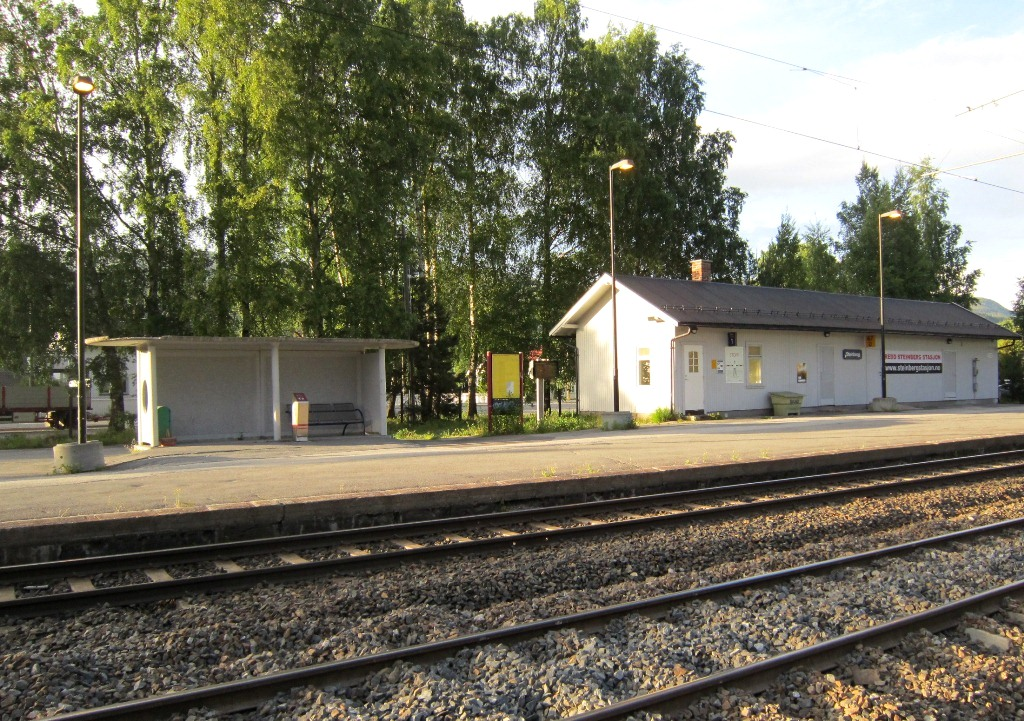

General information
- Location: Steinberg, Nedre Eiker; Norway
- Coordinates: 59°45′34″N 9°57′43″E
- Elevation: 5.4 m (18 ft)
- Owner: Bane NOR
- Operator: Vy
- Line: Sørlandet Line
- Distance: 67.00 km (41.63 mi)
- Platforms: 1

History
- Opened: 1906
Location

Steinberg Station (Norwegian: Steinberg stasjon) is located at the village of Steinberg in Nedre Eiker, Norway on the Sørlandet Line. The station is served by local trains between Kongsberg via Oslo to Eidsvoll operated by Vy. The station was opened in 1906 on what was then part of the Randsfjorden Line.

Preceding station			Following station
Hokksund	Randsfjorden Line		Mjøndalen
Preceding station	Local trains		Following station
Hokksund	R12	Kongsberg–Oslo S–Eidsvoll	Mjøndalen
