= Vestfossen Station =

Railway station in Vestfossen, Øvre Eiker, Norway

Vestfossen
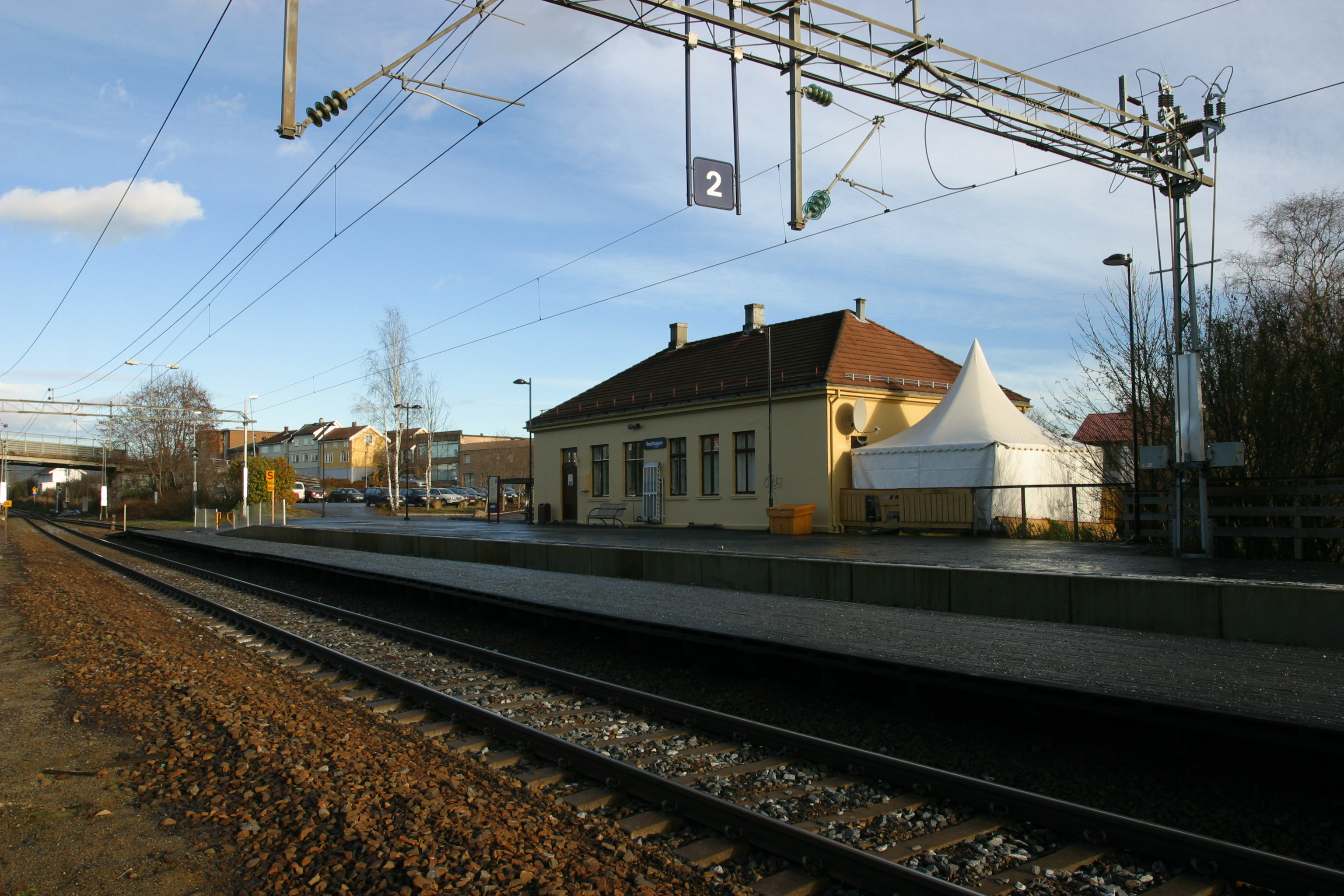

General information
- Location: Vestfossen, Øvre Eiker; Norway
- Coordinates: 59.7344°N 9.8671°E
- Elevation: 22.8 m (75 ft) AMSL
- Owner: Bane NOR
- Operator: Vy
- Line: Sørlandet Line
- Distance: 75.79 km (47.09 mi)
- Platforms: 2

History
- Opened: 1871
Location

Vestfossen Station (Norwegian: Vestfossen stasjon) is a railway station located at the village of Vestfossen in Øvre Eiker, Norway on the railway Sørlandet Line. The station is served by local train service L12 between Kongsberg via Oslo to Eidsvoll operated by Vy.

== History ==
The station was opened in 1871 a branch line of Randsfjorden Line was opened between Hokksund and Kongsberg.

Preceding station	Regional trains	Following station
Darbu towards Kongsberg	R12	Hokksund towards Eidsvoll
