= Darbu Station =

Railway station in Øvre Eiker Municipality, Norway

Darbu
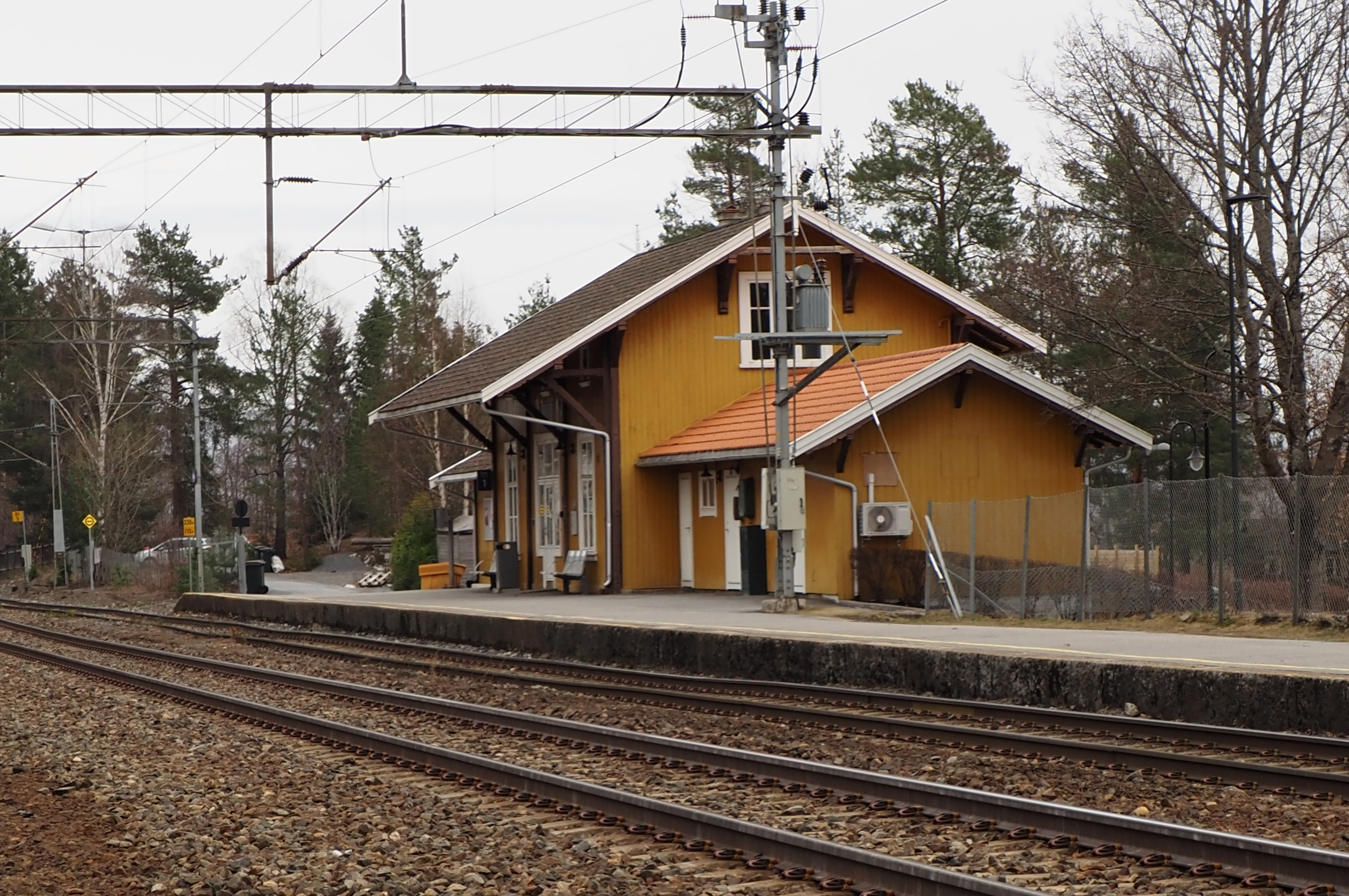

General information
- Location: Darbu, Øvre Eiker; Norway
- Coordinates: 59°42′05″N 9°48′02″E
- Elevation: 60.1 m (197 ft) AMSL
- Owner: Bane NOR
- Operator: Vy
- Line: Sørlandet Line
- Distance: 81.61 km (50.71 mi)
- Platforms: 2

Construction
- Architect: Harald Kaas

History
- Opened: 1871
Location

Darbu Station (Norwegian: Darbu stasjon) is a railway station located in the village of Darbu in Øvre Eiker, Norway, on the Sørlandet Line. The station is served by local train line L12, which runs between Kongsberg via Oslo to Eidsvoll operated by Vy.

== History ==
The station was opened in 1871 when a branch line of the Randsfjorden Line was established between Hokksund and Kongsberg. The station building was also constructed in 1871, and was designed by Henrik Bull. It has been preserved.

Preceding station	Regional trains	Following station
Kongsberg Terminus	R12	Vestfossen towards Eidsvoll
