= Hokksund Station =

Railway station in Øvre Eiker, Norway

Hokksund
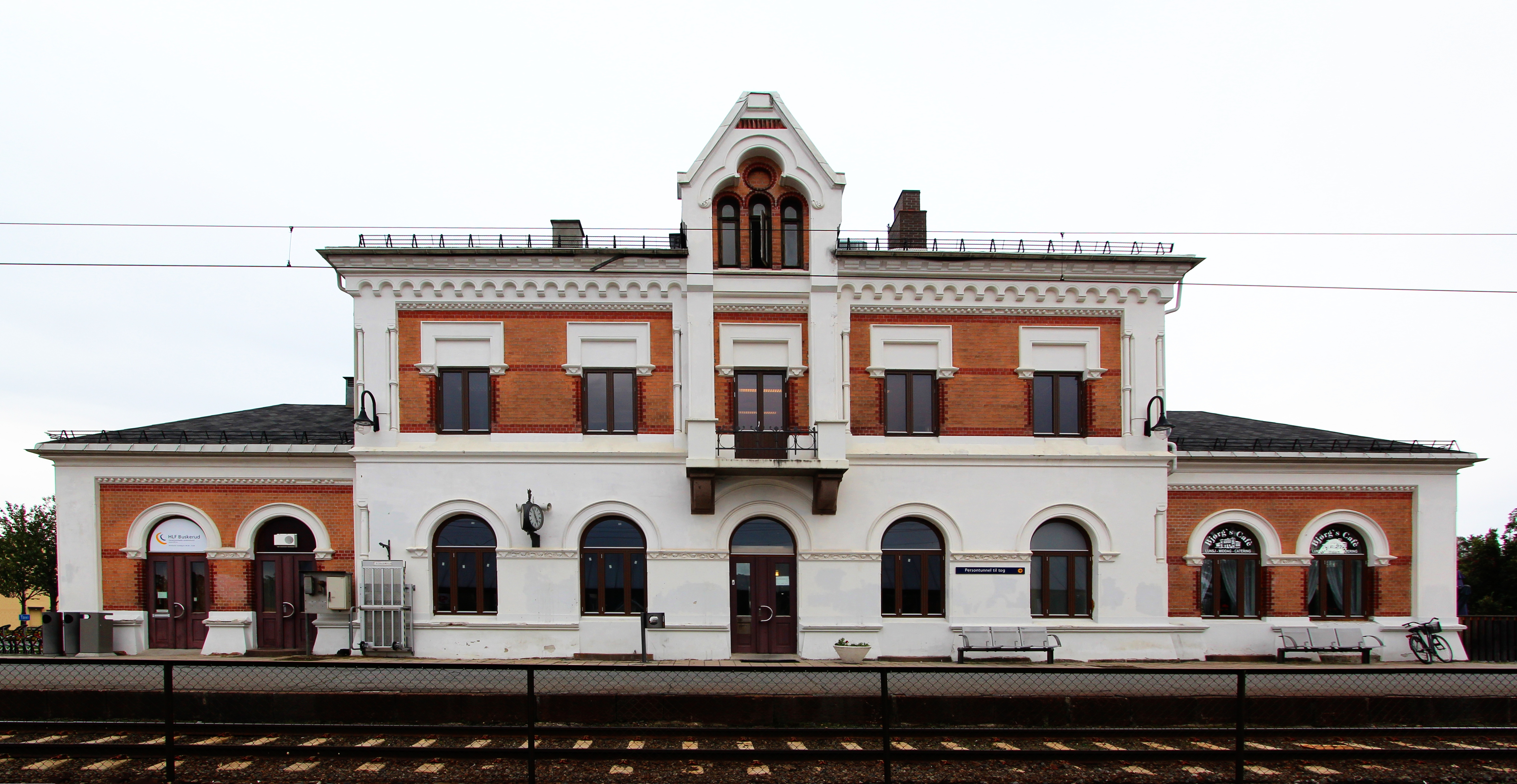

General information
- Location: Hokksund, Øvre Eiker; Norway
- Coordinates: 59°46′1″N 9°54′39″E
- Elevation: 8.0 m (26.2 ft) AMSL
- Owner: Bane NOR
- Operator: Vy
- Lines: Randsfjorden Line; Sørlandet Line
- Distance: 70.22 km (43.63 mi)
- Platforms: 2

History
- Opened: 1866
Location

Hokksund Station (Norwegian: Hokksund stasjon) is in the village of Hokksund in Øvre Eiker, Norway, on the Sørlandet Line. The station is served by local trains between Kongsberg via Oslo to Eidsvoll operated by the Vy as well as express trains from Oslo to Bergen and Kristiansand.

== History ==
The station was opened in 1866 as part of Randsfjorden Line between Drammen and Vikersund. The whole line to Randsfjord was opened to the public in 1868. The stretch from Drammen to Hokksund was electrified in 1929, and from Hokksund to Hønefoss in 1959. In 1971, the station became terminus of the branch line between Hokksund and Kongsberg. The first station building was built in 1864 by architect Henrik Bull. It burnt down in 1895. The second building, created by architect Paul Due, was finished in 1898.

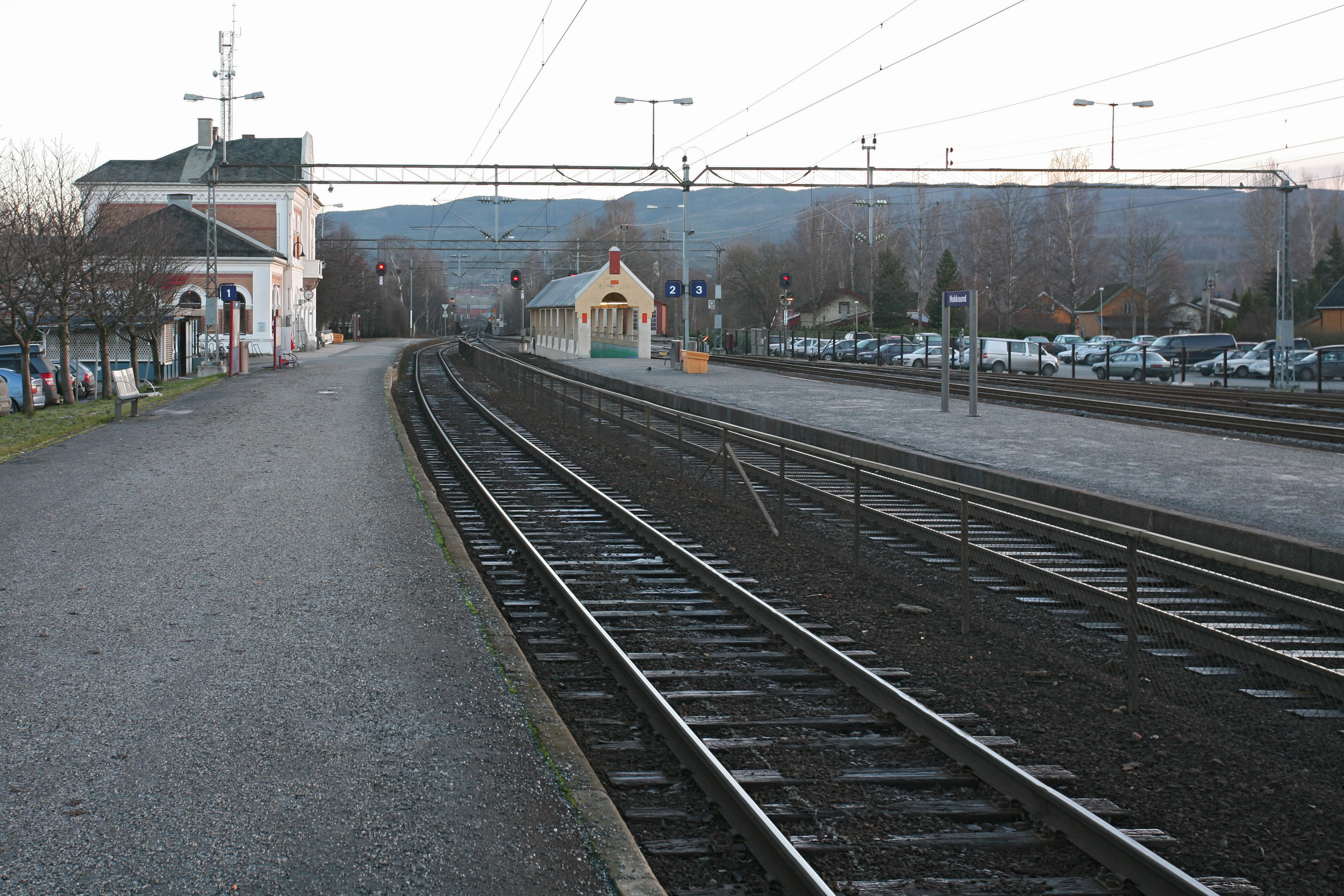
Hokksund Station

Preceding station			Following station
Vikersund	Randsfjorden Line		—
Vestfossen	Sørlandet Line		Steinberg
Preceding station	Express trains		Following station
Vikersund	F4	Bergen–Oslo S	Drammen
Preceding station	Local trains		Following station
Vestfossen	R12	Kongsberg–Oslo S–Eidsvoll	Steinberg
