= Krøderen Line =

Railway line in Norway

Coordinates: 59°58′27″N 9°59′00″E

Norwegian: Krøderbanen
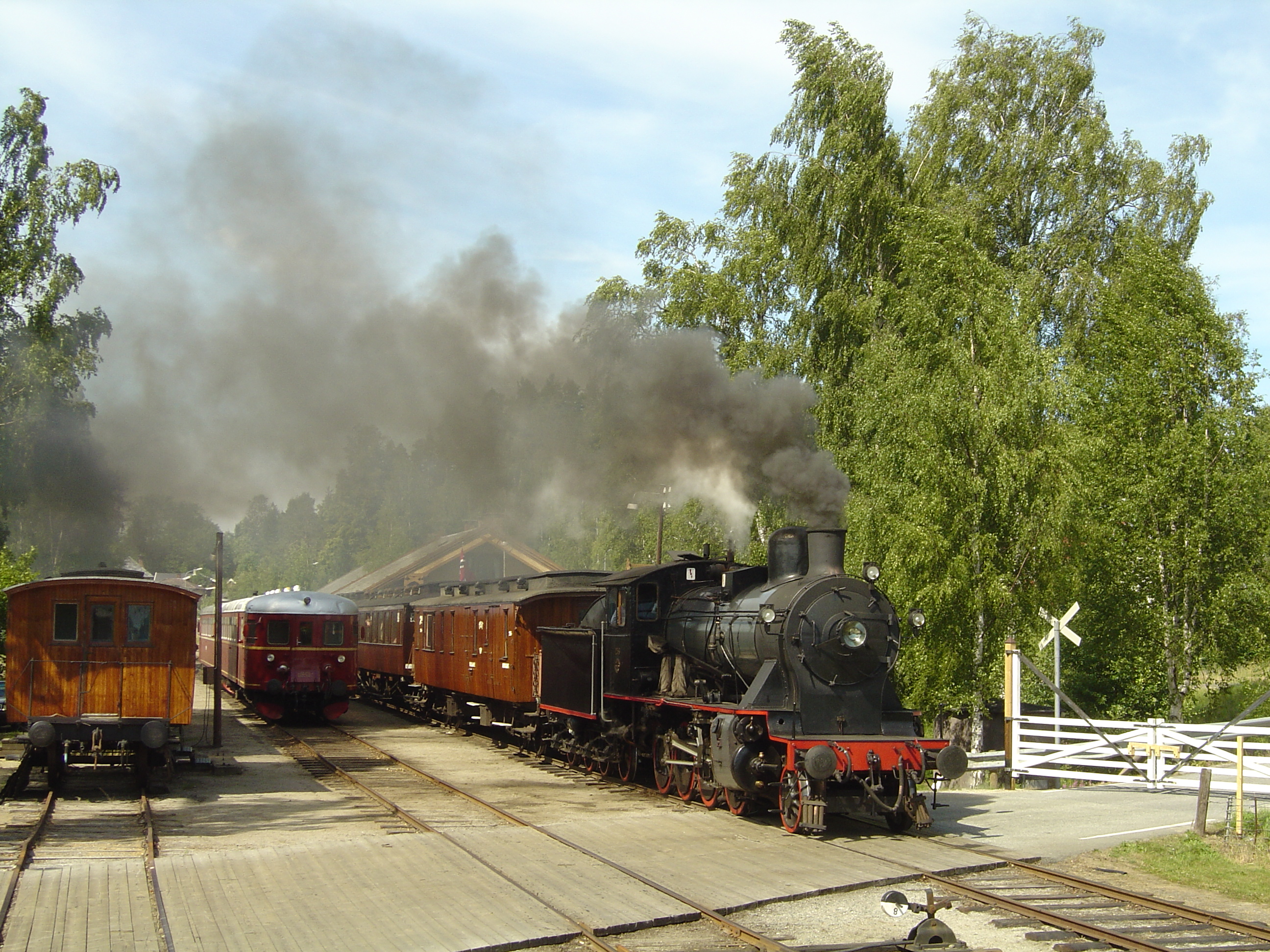
- Loco 236 at Krøderen, 16 July 2006
- Locale: Norway
- Terminus: Vikersund; Krøderen

Commercial operations
- Built by: Norwegian State Railways
- Original gauge: 1,067 mm (3 ft 6 in); 1,435 mm (4 ft 8 1/2 in) standard gauge
- Original electrification: None

Preserved operations
- Owned by: Krøderen Line Foundation
- Operated by: Norwegian Railway Club
- Stations: 6
- Length: 26 km (16 mi)
- Preserved gauge: 1,435 mm (4 ft 8 1/2 in) standard gauge
- Preserved electrification: None

Commercial history
- Opened: 28 November 1872
- Closed to passengers: 1958
- Closed: 1 March 1985

Preservation history
- 2011: Reopened

The Krøderen Line (Norwegian: Krøderbanen) is a heritage railway line connecting the Krøderen lake in Buskerud county, Norway, to the town of Vikersund. The 26-kilometre (16 mi) line was built as a narrow gauge branch line of the Randsfjord Line by the Norwegian State Railways (NSB) and opened in 1872. Passenger services were withdrawn in 1958, and freight traffic in 1985.

As of 2011, the Krøderen Line Foundation and the Norwegian Railway Club jointly operate steam train services on the line from May to October. In addition to the termini at Vikersund and Krøderen there are intermediate stations at Snarum, Sysle, and Kløftefoss.

== History ==
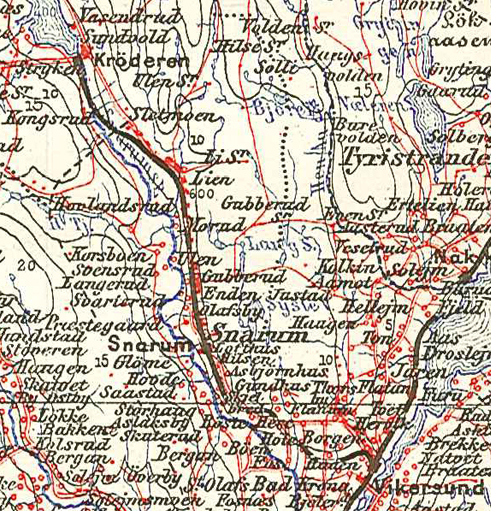
A 1902 map of the Krøderen Line

In the beginning of the 19th century, horse carriages and ships were used for passenger transport in the Buskerud area. There were three government subsidized coaching inns in Krødsherad, which were popular amongst travellers. In 1853, a committee was established, which aimed at improving the passenger transport between Drammen and the rest of Buskerud.

Following the opening of the Randsfjord Line in 1866, railway director Carl Abraham Pihl instructed a terrain investigation of the area between Vikersund and Krøderen. The plan was to build a line connecting Drammen to the waterways of Hallingdalen. Pihl proposed three alternatives for a rail line to Krøderen; one which involved a 25-kilometre (16 mi) long route from Drolsum, a second, 32-kilometre (20 mi) long route from Åmot over Sigdal and a third from Vikersund, at a length of 222-kilometre (138 mi). The latter was chosen, as it was the shortest and cheapest to construct.

The construction of the line started in the spring of 1870. The terrain was difficult for railway construction; the right-of-way had sixteen sharp curves and the gradient from Vikersund was 1:45. The line was constructed with the narrow 3 ft 6 in (1,067 mm), which cost less than the standard gauge. The line cost 10,15 Norwegian speciedaler per kilometre, which made it the cheapest railway line yet constructed in Norway. King Oscar II arrived at Krøderen on 19 November 1872. He was met with a speech and a guided tour in the Krøderen Station, which was decorated for the occasion. The line was officially opened on 28 November, but without any celebration of the kind as of the week before.

There were in the beginning halts at Hære, Jemterud, Hole, Lofthus, Gubberud and Uhla. Jemterud and Hole were replaced by Sysle in 1894; Lofthus had its name changed to Snarum in 1874. In 1891, a pulp mill was established at Ramfoss, which became connected to the line with a side track from the newly created Kløftefoss Station. There were in the first years two trains per day on the Krøderen Line, which corresponded with trains on the Randsfjord Line at Vikersund. In the first year of operation, the ridership from Vikersund to Lofthus (later Snarum) was at 11 persons per day, whilst it from Lofthus to Krøderen was 5 to 6 persons. The ridership increased in the following years, with a peak of 16.544 passengers in 1874.

The line's main traffic and the principal source of its revenue was timber. The timber origined from the forests around the line and was either floated to paper factories in Drammen or exported to England. At Gubberud and Slettemoen, side tracks from the line were laid down to transport timber from sawmills. When the Bergen Line was constructed in the late 1910s, building materials were freighted on the Krøderen Line and on steam ships over the Krøderen lake. Following the 1908 opening of the Bergen Line to Gulsvik, the traffic on the Krøderen Line reached its peak. Passengers were able to travel from Kristiania to Bergen by taking a train from Oslo West Station to Krøderen Station, a steam ship over the Krøderen lake to Gulsvik and a direct train from Gulsvik to Bergen. On 31 October 1909, the Bergen Line was extended from Gulsvik to Hønefoss. Passengers travelling from Kristiania to Bergen could then travel directly, and needed not take a steam ship across Krøderen. The passenger traffic on the Krøderen Line was halved in the following year.

On 5 August 1908, the Railway Committee of the Norwegian Parliament decided to upgrade the track gauge of the Krøderen Line to standard gauge. In August 1910, a train derailed approximately 1 kilometre (0.62 mi) from Sysle Station because a creek had flooded and taken away all the ballast underneath the tracks. Three persons were killed in the accident, whilst six survived. On 9 May 1948, diesel powered trains were put in operation on the Krøderen Line. The diesel-powered trains were faster than the steam-powered; a steam-powered train travelled from Vikersund to Krøderen in 55 minutes, whilst the new diesel-powered trains only used 35 minutes. Owing to low passenger traffic, passenger trains on the Krøderen Line were decided to be replaced with buses in 1956. The last passenger train travelled in 1958, and the roads around the line were improved. The freight traffic on the line continued, although the last steam-powered freight train travelled on 1 November 1967, since the floating of timber in the waterways of Hallindalen was ceased in the same year. On 28 February 1985, the last diesel-powered freight train travelled on the Krøderen Line.

Gathering inspiration from the Urskog–Høland Line, the Norwegian Railway Club lobbied to preserve the Krøderen Line as a heritage railway. In the autumn of 1973, the club sent a letter to the state railways' department in Drammen, in which it stated that the Krøderen Line was well-suited for tourist traffic with heritage trains. The department supported the proposal, and in September 1977 the Norwegian Railway Club invited the heritage committee of Buskerud to an inspection.

Passenger services on the line were withdrawn in 1958, and in 1985 freight traffic too was discontinued. Two years later the Norwegian Parliament resolved to retain the line as a heritage railway and to preserve Krøderen Station as a museum at Krøderen.

At Vikersund there is a junction with the Randsfjordbane while from the station at Krøderen the steamboats D/S Haakon Adelsten (built in 1861), Krøderen, and Norefjeld formerly operated to Gulsvik, taking 2½ hours to complete their journey. The last steamboat sailed in 1925.

== See also ==
- Narrow gauge railways in Norway
