= På Sporet =

Norwegian railway magazine

På Sporet (lit. 'On the Track') is a quarterly magazine published by the Norwegian Railway Club. The magazine was started in 1969. It is dominated by news and feature articles about domestic trains and rail transport, but also has a limited amount of international news and features.
