= Darbu =

Village in Buskerud County, Norway

Coordinates: 59°41′55″N 9°47′47″E

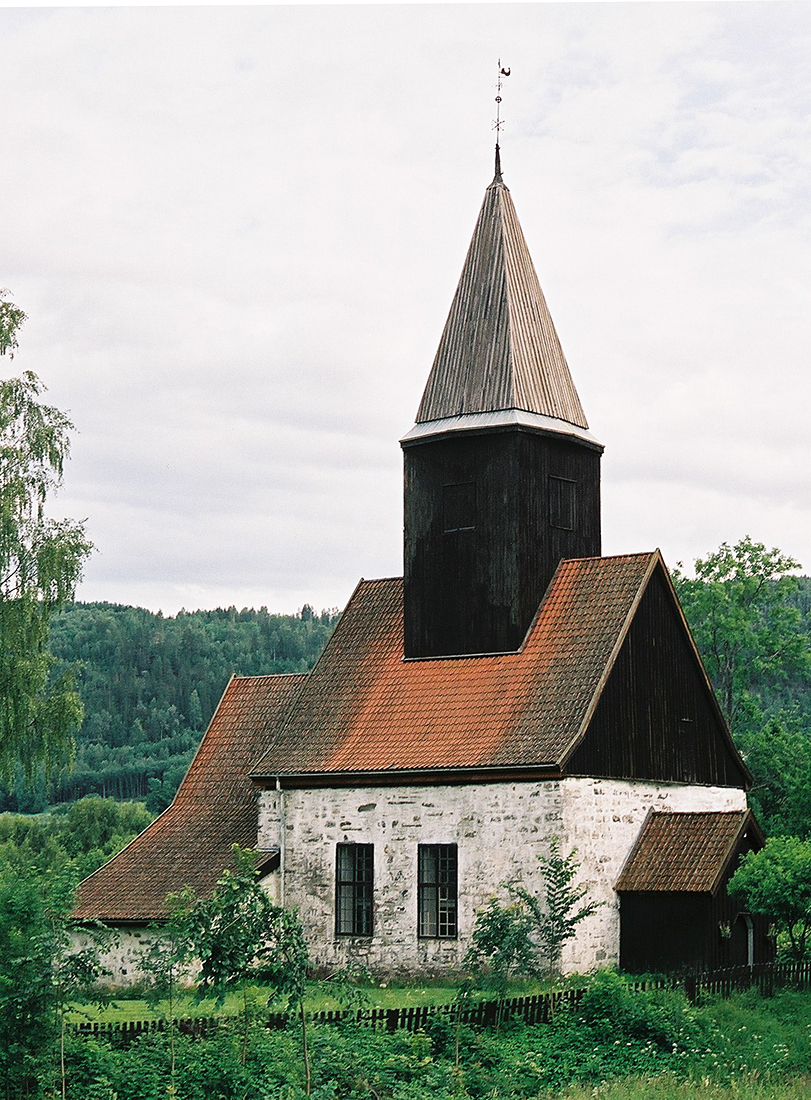
Fiskum gamle kirke

Darbu is a village within the parish of Fiskum, in the municipality of Øvre Eiker, Buskerud County, Norway. The population of the village was 539 as of 2019.

Darbu is located on the Sørland Line Railway, 81.61 km from Oslo, about midway between Kongsberg and Hokksund. Darbu Station was opened in 1871 when the railway branch line between Hokksund and Kongsberg was completed.

Fiskum Old Church (Fiskum Gamle Kirke) is the community's most important heritage site. This is a medieval, Romanesque church dating from approximately 1200 A.D. The church was dedicated to Saint Olav. Fiskum Old Church was constructed in a rectangular shape and built of stone. It was one of the smaller local churches and used only occasionally in summer. The church consists of a short nave and a lower and narrower, the right end of choir. The church is built of stone fracture in lime mortar and plastered inside. The pulpit dates from 1650. The altarpiece and baptismal font date from approx. 1713. The tower contained three bells in 1629, which were changed into two clocks during 1685–1689.
