= Vikersund Station =

Railway station in Modum, Norway

Coordinates: 59°58′10.32″N 9°59′54.92″E

Vikersund
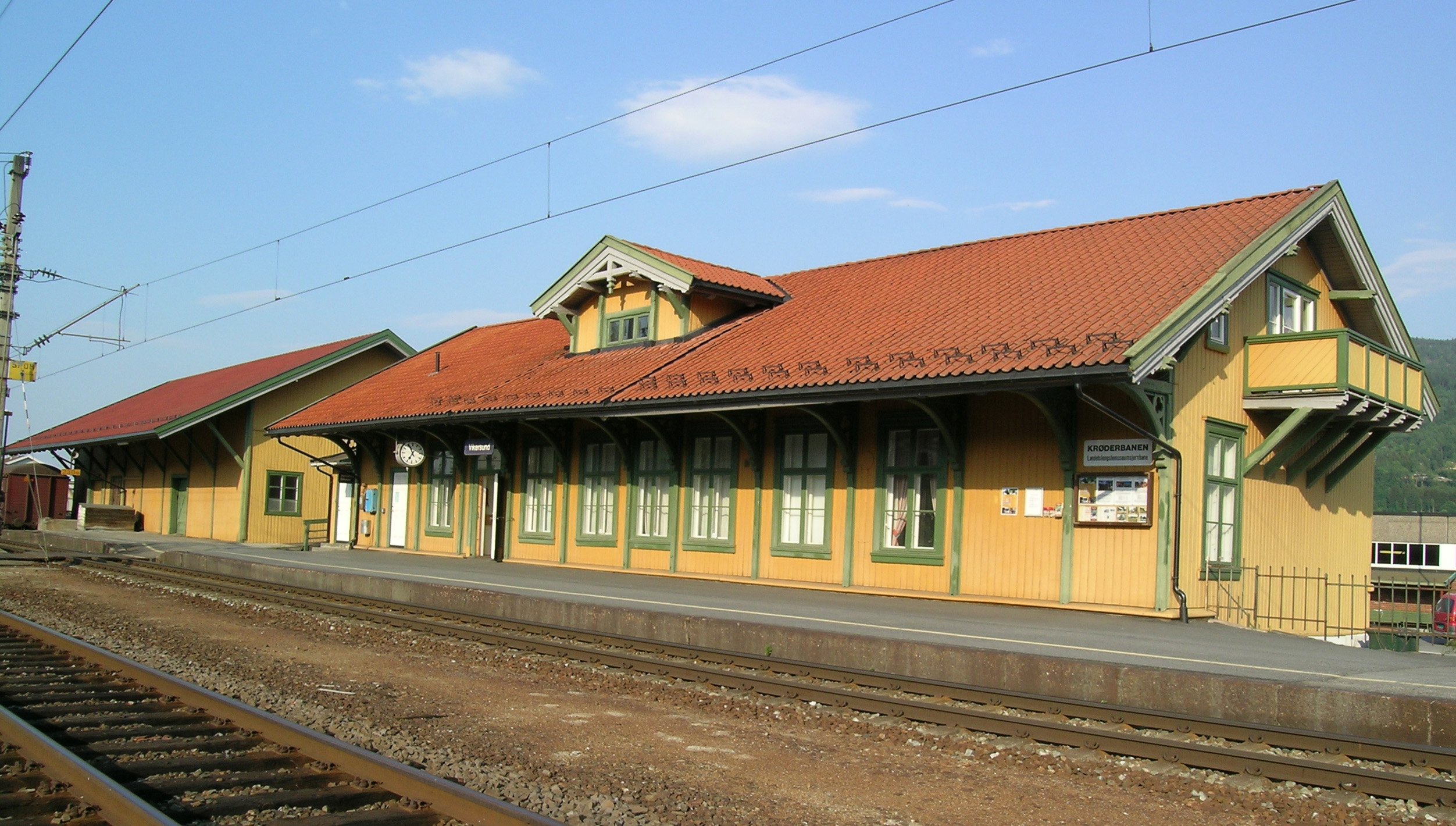

General information
- Location: Vikersund, Modum; Norway
- Elevation: 67.1 m (220 ft)
- Owner: Bane NOR
- Operator: Vy Tog
- Line: Randsfjorden Line
- Distance: 84.5 km
- Platforms: 2

Construction
- Architect: Georg Andreas Bull

History
- Opened: 1866
Location

Vikersund Station (Norwegian: Vikersund stasjon) is a railway station located at the village of Vikersund in Modum, Norway. At Vikersund there is a junction with the Randsfjorden Line (Randsfjordbane) on which Vy Tog operates some express trains between Bergen and Oslo.

== History ==
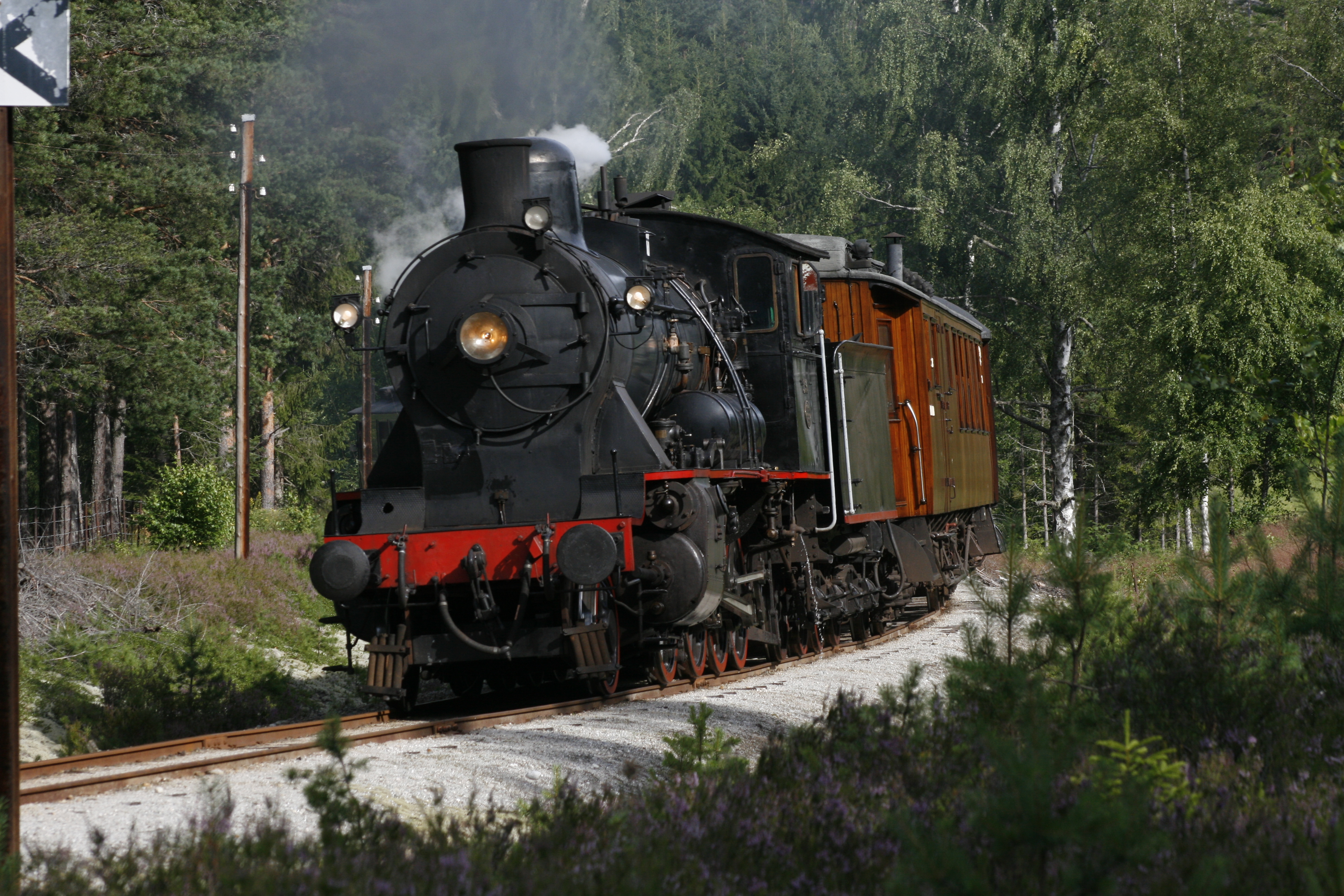
Damplocotype 24b No. 236 with passenger train on Krøderbanen

The station was opened in 1866, as part of the Randsfjorden Line. In 1872, Vikersund became the terminus of the Krøderen Line (Krøderbanen), a 26 kilometres (16 mi) branch line to the lake of Krøderen. Passenger services on the Krøderen Line were withdrawn in 1958 and freight traffic in 1985. The rail line was transformed into a heritage railway with outings between Vikersund Station and Krøderen, a distance of about 26 km. The rail lane is operated by the Norwegian Railway Club and the Krøderbanen Foundation.

Preceding station			Following station
Hønefoss	Randsfjorden Line		Hokksund
Preceding station	Express trains		Following station
Hønefoss	F4	Bergen–Oslo S	Hokksund
