= Hønefoss Station =

Railway station in Ringerike, Norway

Hønefoss
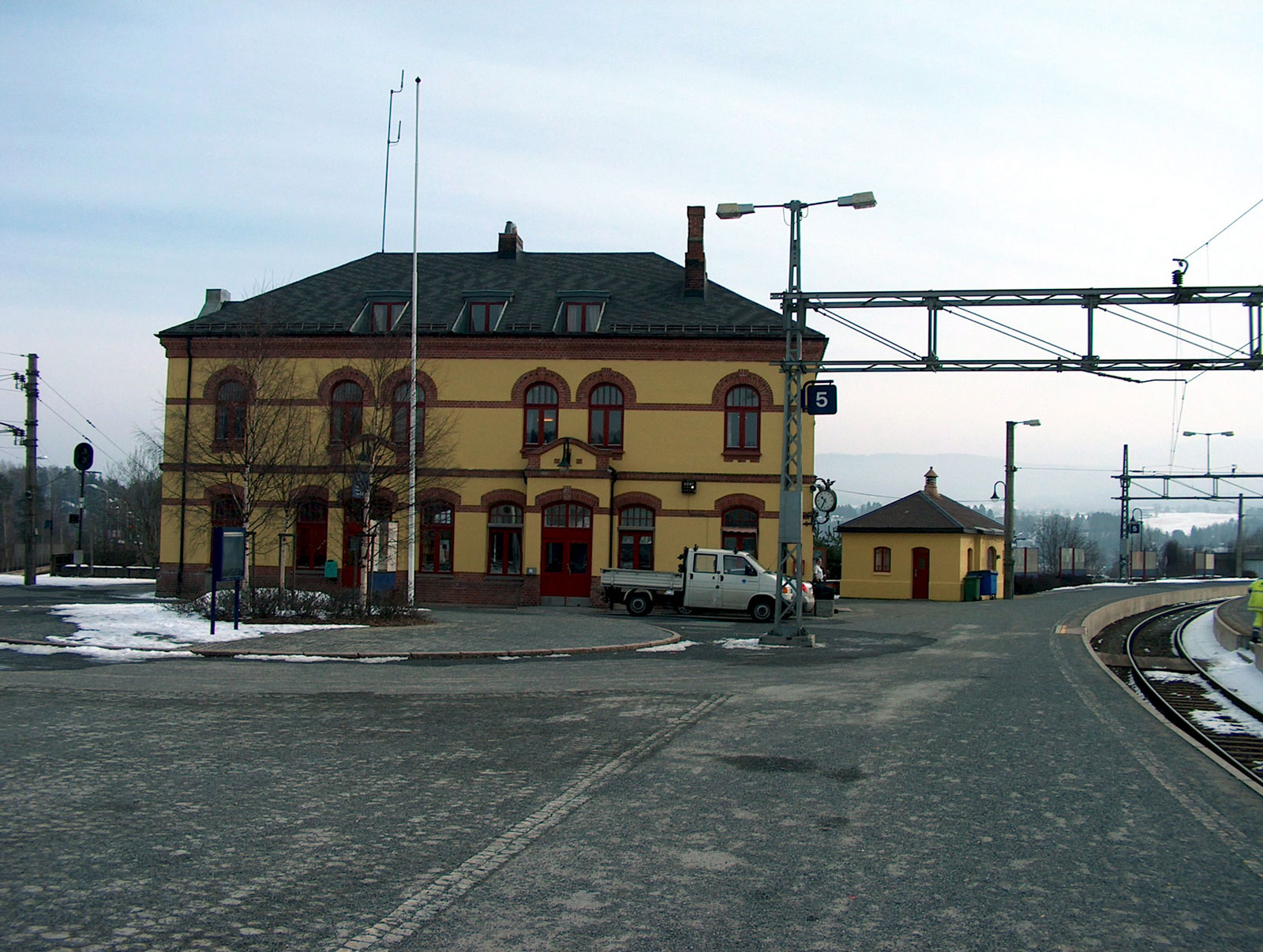
- The west side of Hønefoss Station. To the left trains heading towards Drammen. Behind the small yellow building was the old station house.

General information
- Location: Hønefoss, Ringerike; Norway
- Coordinates: 60°10′8.8284″N 10°14′53.153″E
- Elevation: 96.8 m (318 ft)
- Owner: Bane NOR
- Operator: Vy Tog
- Lines: Bergen Line; Randsfjorden Line; Roa–Hønefoss Line
- Distance: 89.57 km (55.66 mi)
- Platforms: 2
- Connections: Bus: Brakar

Other information
- Station code: HFS

History
- Opened: 12 October 1868
Location

Hønefoss Station (Norwegian: Hønefoss stasjon) is a railway station located at Hønefoss in Ringerike, Norway. The station is located at the intersection between the Bergen Line, the Randsfjorden Line and the Roa–Hønefoss Line. Hønefoss is served by express trains to Oslo and Bergen, but all local train traffic has been terminated. The station is designed as a V-shape keilbahnhof.

Norsk Museumstog has its operation base at Hønefoss station, where it maintains all its locomotives. Norwegian Museumstog, cooperating with the Norwegian Railway Club, works on the restoration, maintenance and operation of railway equipment. All revenues go to the maintenance of trains and locomotives with cultural value.

Begna Railway Bridge is a 216-metre-long (709 ft) bridge that runs over the Ådal River (lower part of Begna) at Hønefoss Station, directly above the Hønefoss water falls. The bridge was built in 1898, adopted at the same time that it was decided that the Bergen Line would go to Hønefoss.

== History ==
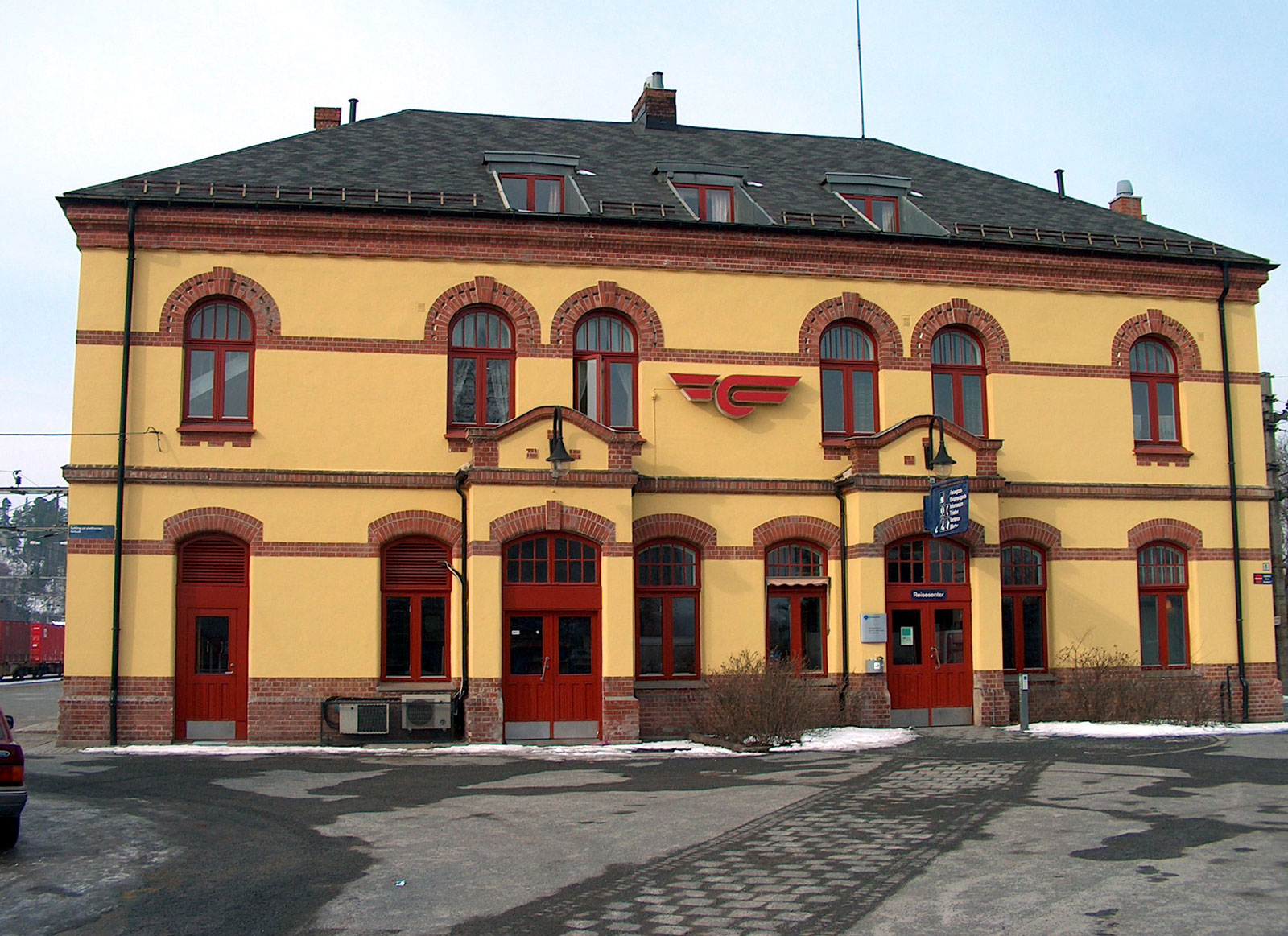
Hønefoss Station's east side facing the city

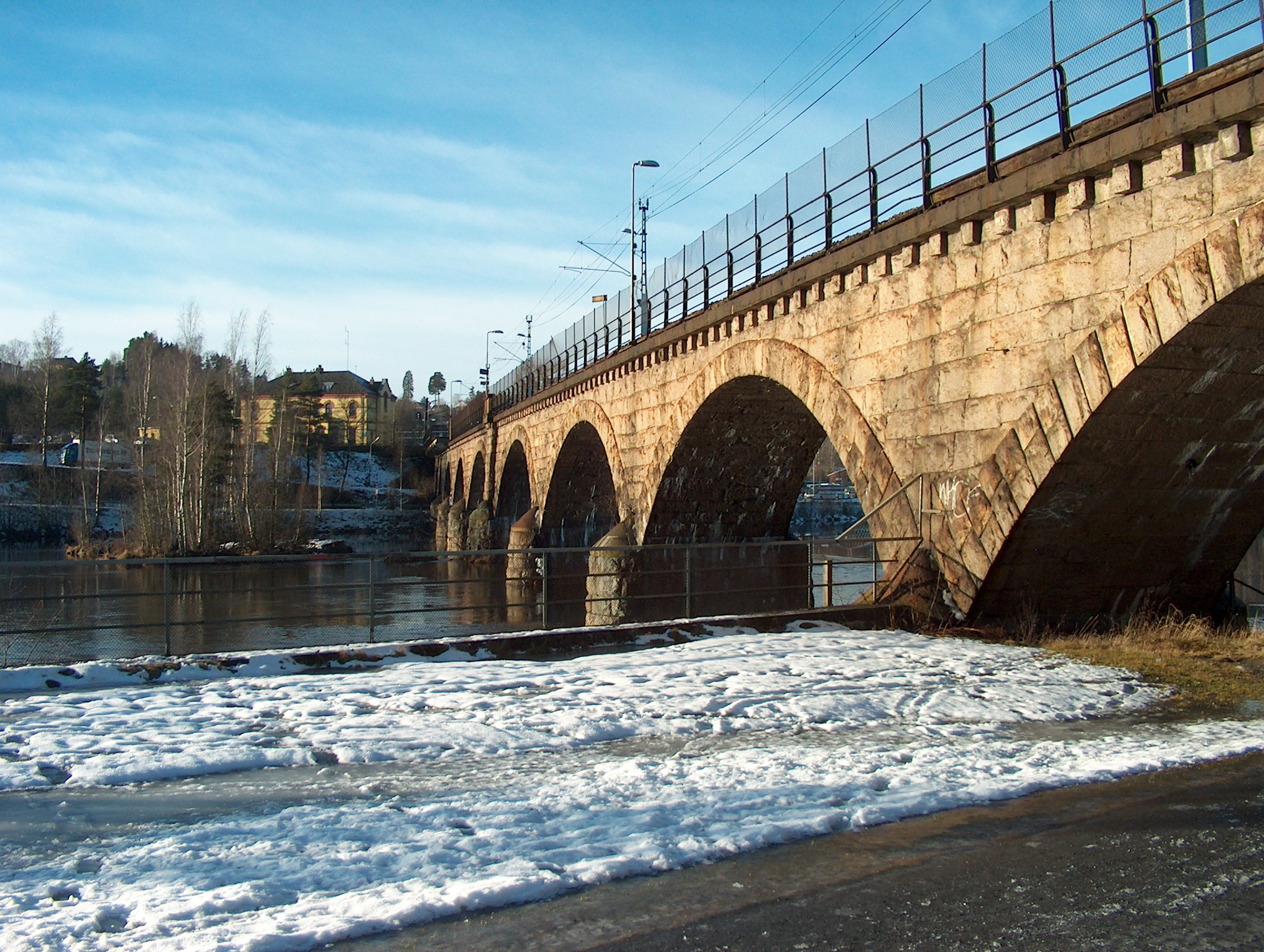
Begna Bridge past Begna River

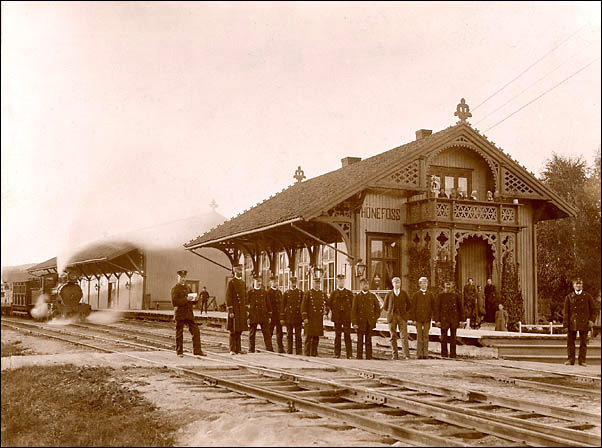
Hønefoss Station in 1900

During the second half of the 19th century, Hønefoss and the surrounding areas saw significant technological development. From being a small village with commerce related to the waterfall and the sawmills, the railway connection to Drammen in 1868 was vital for the city's industry and trade into the 20th century.

The idea of a railway from Drammen to Hønefoss was launched in 1846, before any other railways were constructed in Norway. The Land municipal council had contacted the Ministry of the Interior granting a wish to better communication between Drammen and the lakes of Tyrifjorden and Randsfjorden. But nothing happened at the time. In 1853, one year before the first railway line in Norway, Trunk Line, opened, the city council in Drammen created a committee to consider possible connections to Opplandede. At the time a canal was considered, but since it only could be used half the year the concept was dropped. In 1857 the civil engineer Carl Abraham Pihl was given the responsibility from the Ministry of Inner Affairs to consider whether it was possible to construct a railway between Drammen and Randsfjorden, and his report was concluded on 31 May 1858. It concluded with that it was possible to build the Randsfjord Line, and he had also estimated the costs of the project to 1,150,000 Norwegian speciedaler. Drammen city council conducted a meeting on the topic in Hønefoss on 12 September 1859 where it was decided to start construction.

On 11 June 1863, the Parliament of Norway voted with 65 against 44 mandates in favor of the line. The first part of the Randsfjord Line was opened on 31 October 1866, connecting Vikersund to Drammen. On 1 December 1867 the line was extended to Skjærdalen in Tyristrand. Eventually the railway station at Hønefoss was concluded and on 12 October 1868 the train could arrive at Randsfjord Station on Randsfjorden, just outside the village of Jevnaker. The Randsfjorden Line was the fifth railway line in Norway.

The next large project to reach Hønefoss was the Bergen Line, which was opened on 27 November 1909. Until then the original station had consisted of low buildings in wood, located in front of the west side of the building, along the platform to the Drammen trains. The new station built in 1909 for the opening of the Bergen Line also included a café—which was taken over by Norsk Spisevognselskap on 20 November 1923—though this was closed in 1972. At the other end of the station area was the depot, where there among others a roundhouse and turntable. On the upper side of the platform there was formerly a short side track towards the area where Ringerike Dairy was located. This was also the spot used to fill steam locomotives with coal and water. There was a water tower and a coal depot.

On 31 July 1926 Sperillen Line opened, connecting Finsand in Ådal to the Randsfjorden and Bergen Line, though passenger traffic was terminated on 1 July 1933. The bus had competed away all profits. Since 1 August 1957 freight traffic was also terminated. At the end of the 1950s Norwegian State Railways was using large resources getting rid of steam power, with the motto "away with the steam!". For Hønefoss Station, the first electrification was the Randsfjorden Line in 1959, while the Bergen Line was electrified (till Ål Station) in 1962, and eventually the water and steam depot was removed.

Passenger traffic on the Randsfjorden Line north of Hønefoss was terminated on 26 May 1968, after 100 years of operation and thus removing the last diesel trains in scheduled traffic. In 1979, the old Lloyd Warehouses in wood, on the southwest side of the tracks were razed. The rest of the old station was razed in 1987. Local trains stopped running from Hønefoss to Drammen on 7 January 2001. 31 May 2005 was the last day Hønefoss Station was staffed.

== Ringerike Line ==
Since the original plans for the Bergen Line there have existed plans to extend the Bergen Line to Sandvika Station. At the time the Roa–Hønefoss Line was built, to utilize Gjøvik Line. This allowed the trains from Bergen to operate to the larger Oslo East Station instead of the smaller Oslo West Station. The line also allowed for a connection between the eastern and western networks. There are currently plans to build a new, single track high-speed railway between Hønefoss and Sandvika that will shorten travel time from Hønefoss to Oslo Central Station by about 50 minutes.

| Preceding station | | | Following station |
|---|---|---|---|
| Flå | Bergen Line | | — |
| — Heen | Randsfjorden Line | | Vikersund |
| — | Roa–Hønefoss Line | | Roa |
| Preceding station | Express trains | | Following station |
| Flå | F4 | Bergen–Oslo S | Vikersund |
