= Norwegian Railway Club =

Railway preservation association

Coordinates: 60°10′8.8284″N 10°14′53.153″E

The Norwegian Railway Club (Norwegian: Norsk Jernbaneklubb) is an association which is involved in the preservation of Norwegian museum railways. NMT has its operating base at Hønefoss Station in Ringerike, Norway. The society was founded on 22 May 1969, and is based at Bryn Station in Oslo, but with local groups all over the country. It publishes the magazine På Sporet four times a year, as well as publishing numerous books. The club also operates two heritage railways, the Old Voss Line in Bergen, and the Krøder Line. Most of the work is done by volunteers.

The Norwegian Railway Club runs Norwegian Heritage Trains or NMT (Norsk Museumstog). All the members of NMT are volunteers and their classic train activities are under government supervision. NMT is doing restoration, preservation and operation of classic trains at the 1,435 mm (4 ft 8 1/2 in) standard gauge part of the Norwegian railway network. The activity of NMT is not run for the purpose of profit. All income of the activity is solely used for the preservation of Norwegian railway history so that the coming generations will be allowed to experience and learn transport by train of the 19th and 20th centuries.

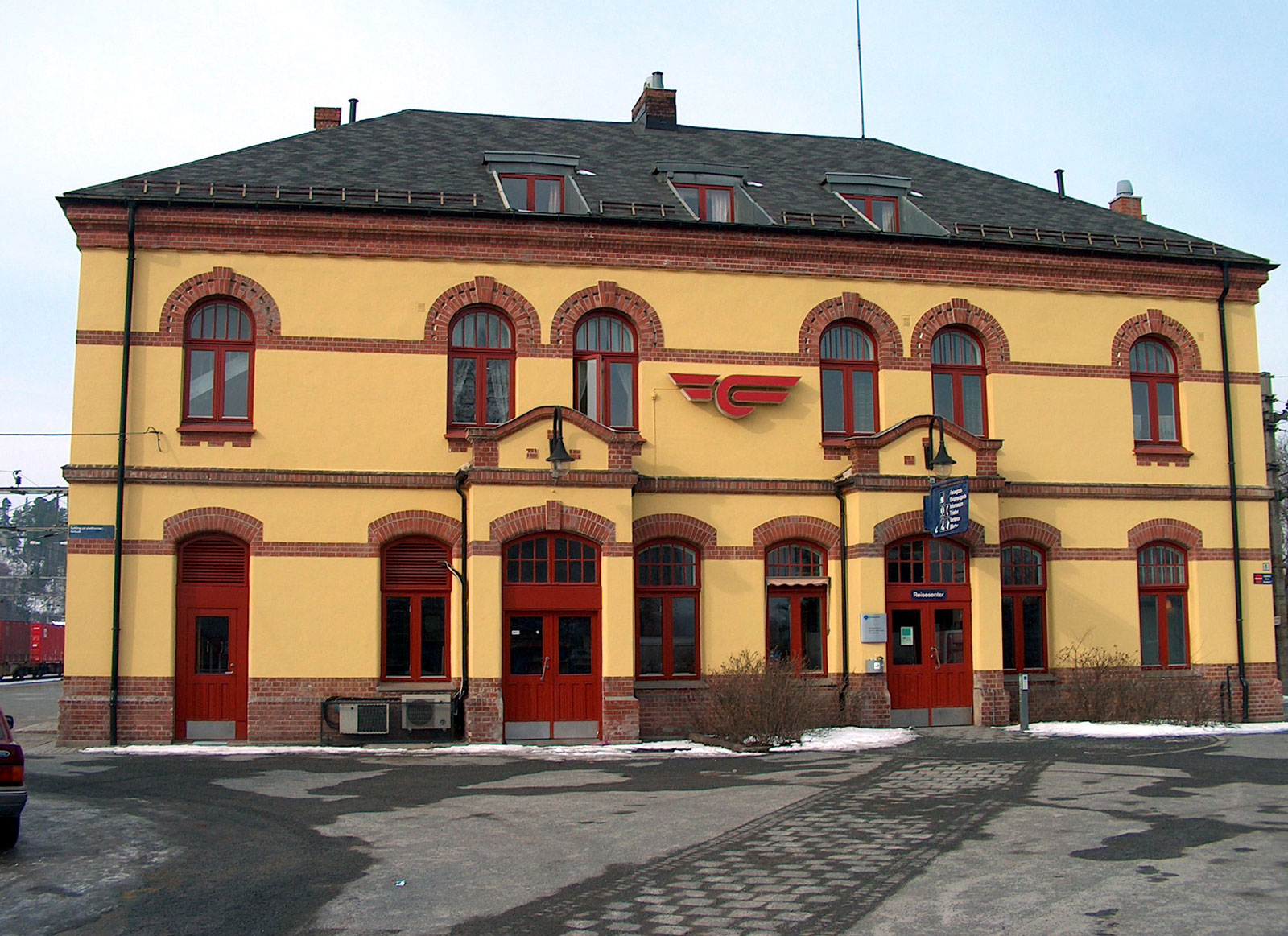
Hønefoss Station

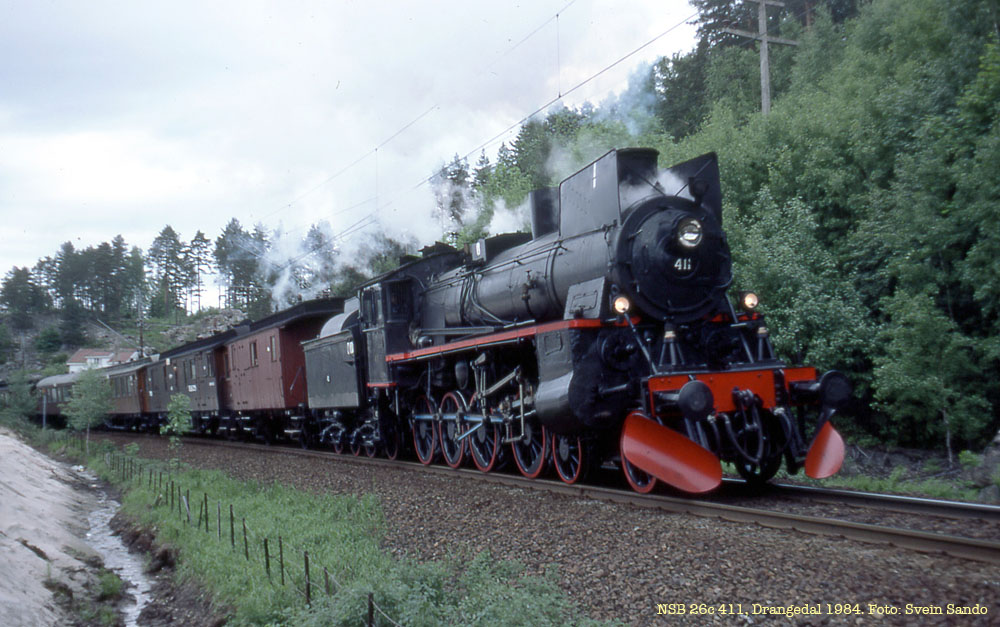
NSB class 26c, no.411 vintage train near Drangedal in 1984
