= Randsfjord Station =

Railway station in Jevnaker, Norway

Randsfjord
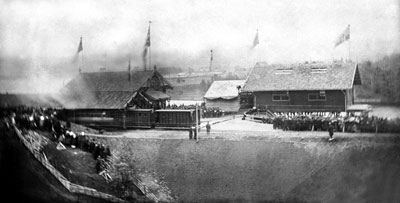
- Randsfjord Station in 1868

General information
- Location: Jevnaker, Norway
- Coordinates: 60°14′34″N 10°22′43″E
- Elevation: 141.4 m (464 ft)
- Owner: Norwegian State Railways
- Operator: Norwegian State Railways
- Line: Randsfjorden Line
- Distance: 142.41 km

History
- Opened: 1868
- Closed: 1968
Location

Randsfjord Station (Norwegian: Randsfjord stasjon) was a railway station at located on the west bank of the south of the lake of Randsfjorden in Jevnaker, Norway. Passengers could transfer to steam ship for transport on Randsfjorden.

== History ==
The station was opened in 1868 when it became the northern terminus of Randsfjorden Line. Two station buildings were finished in 1868, created by architect Henrik Bull. One of them burnt down the following year. With the completion of the Roa–Hønefoss Line, the line between Hønefoss and Randsfjord received less traffic.

Passenger traffic to Randsfjord station was terminated on 26 May 1968. Since 1 January 1981 there has been no traffic on the line between Bergermoen and Randsfjord, with the tracks being removed in 1984.

Preceding station		Following station
Styggdal	Randsfjorden Line	—
