= Randsfjorden Line =

Railway line in Norway

Coordinates: 59°58′09″N 9°59′53″E

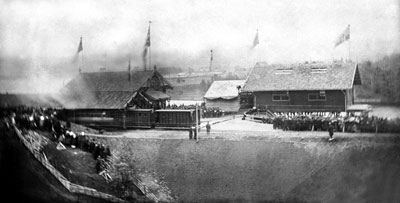
- The opening of Randsfjordbanen in 1868

Overview
- Native name: Randsfjordbanen
- Owner: Bane NOR
- Termini: Drammen Station; Randsfjord Station

Service
- Type: Railway
- System: Rail transport in Norway
- Operator(s): Vy Tog
- Rolling stock: BM 73

History
- Opened: 1866 (to Vikersund); 1868 (to Randsfjorden)

Technical
- Line length: 87 kilometres (54 mi)
- Number of tracks: 1
- Character: Long-haul passenger traffic
- Track gauge: 1,435 mm (4 ft 8 1/2 in) standard gauge
- Electrification: 15 kV 16.7 Hz AC
- Operating speed: Max. 130 km/h (81 mph)

The Randsfjorden Line (Norwegian: Randsfjordbanen) is an 87-kilometre-long (54 mi) railway located in Buskerud in Norway connecting Drammen to Hønefoss and Jevnaker in Akershus county. The railway is primarily used for passenger trains, and the only scheduled trains on the stretch are Vy Tog express trains on the Bergen Line between Oslo and Bergen. Freight trains to Bergen go to Hønefoss via the Gjøvik Line. The railway is owned by Bane NOR.

The entire line is standard gauge, and the 71 kilometres (44 mi) from Drammen to Hønefoss is electrified at 15 kV 16.7 Hz AC. The remaining 16 kilometres (9.9 mi) from Hønefoss to Randsfjorden is not electrified and currently disused. The line gets its name from the lake Randsfjorden.

== History ==
On 11 June 1857, railway director Carl Abraham Pihl was demanded by a Royal Decree to instruct a terrain investigation of the area along the river Drammenselva from Drammen to Randsfjorden. He presented the results of the investigation on 31 May 1858, which concluded that the terrain between Drammen and Randsfjorden was favorable for a rail line.

Pihl thereupon proposed a rail line from Randsfjorden with a branch line to Hen. He argued with forester Thorvald Meiddell, who wanted to construct a canal rather than a rail line. In a meeting on 12 September 1859 in the Drammen chairmanship, the rail line solution was decided upon. On 6 March 1863, the final decision was made, with six against three votes. It was also decided to make a government loan of 2,32 million kr. Parliament passed the construction of the rail line on 11 June 1863, with 65 against 44 votes.

The construction of the Randsfjord Line was begun on 4 December 1863, and, on 1 September 1866, the line was finished to Vikersund. Two years later, the entire line to Randsfjord Station was opened. A celebration took place at the station, where King Charles XV with his family took part.

On 1 December 1867 Skjærdalen and Tyristrand were connected to the line and finally on 12 October 1868 Hønefoss Station opened and the line could stretch all the way to Randsfjorden. The line was the fifth railway line to be built in Norway. When the Bergen Line was built a new line between Roa on Gjøvikbanen and Hønefoss was opened in 1909, providing two different lines between Hønefoss and Oslo.

== Images ==
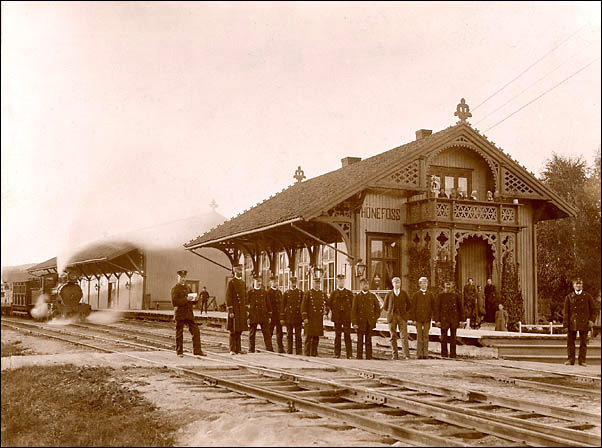
Hønefoss Station around 1900

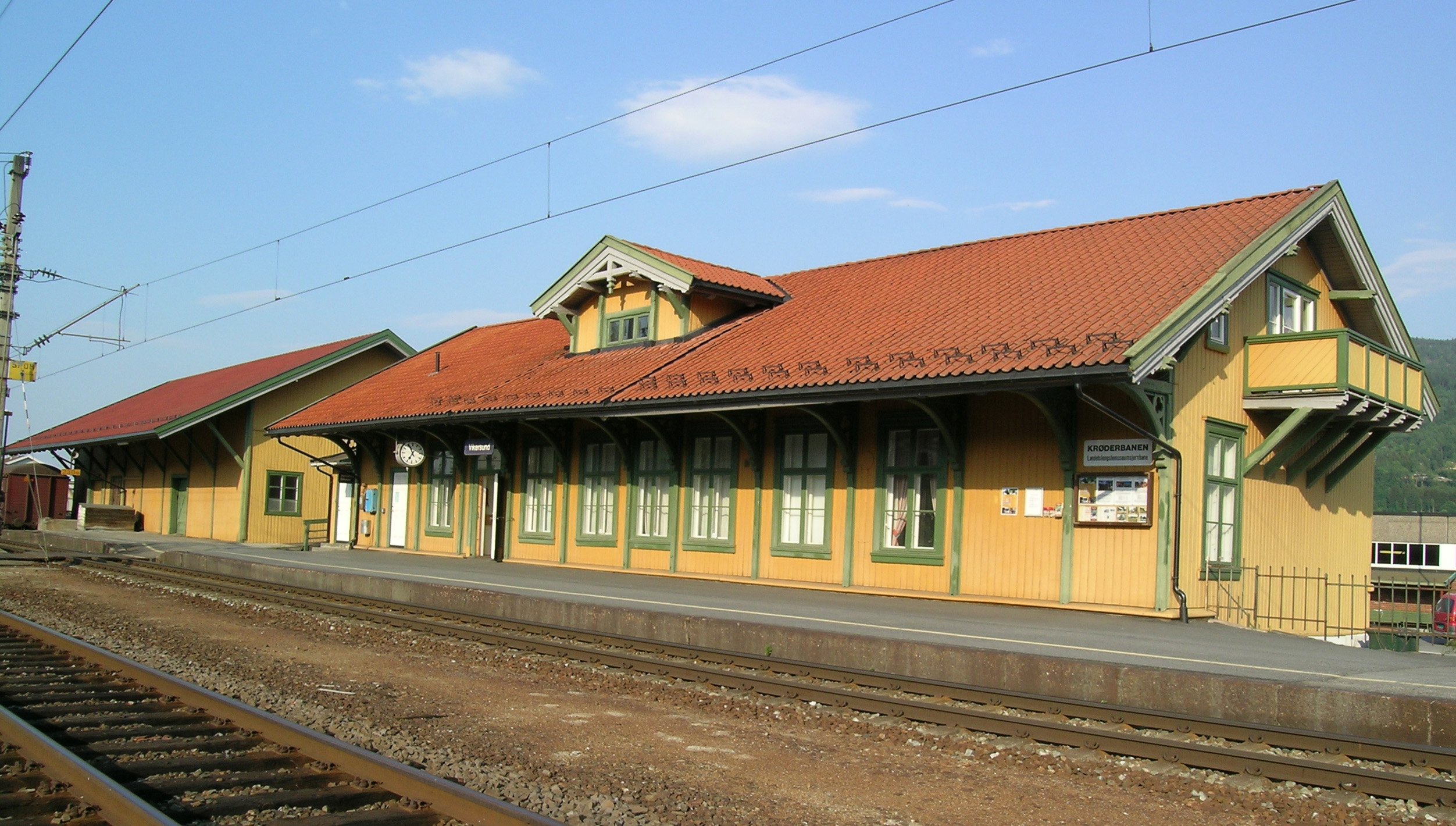
Vikersund Station

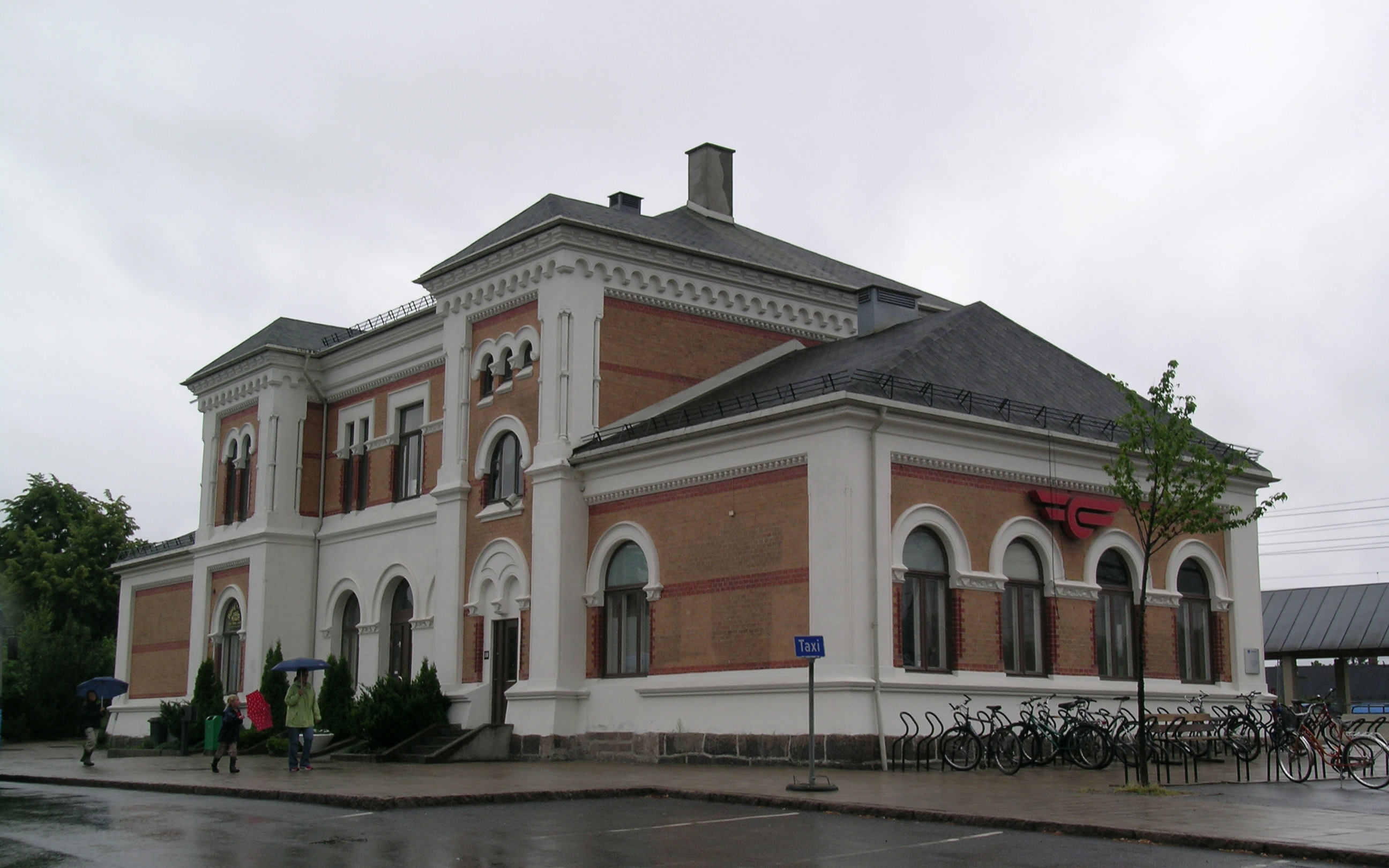
Hokksund Station

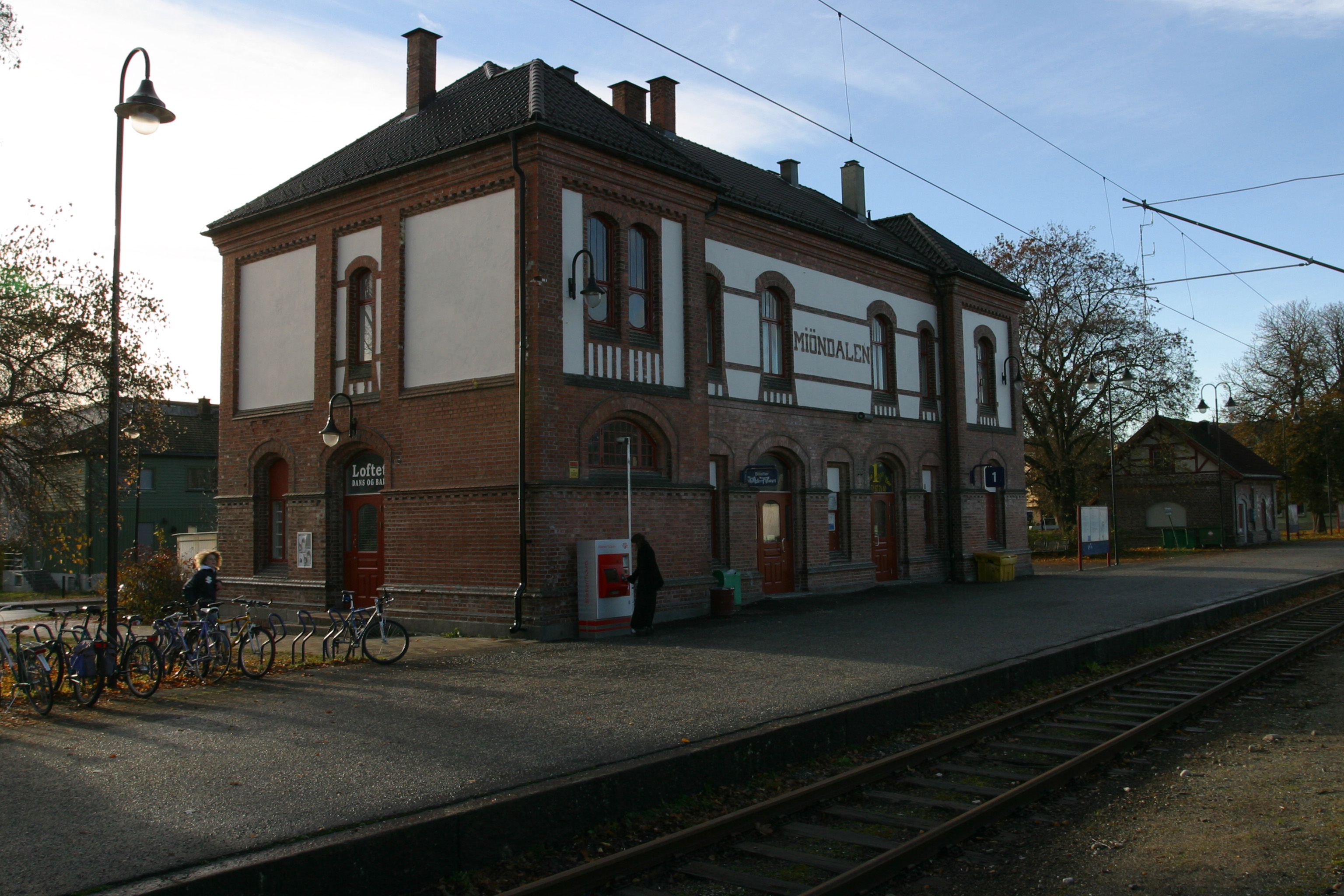
Mjøndalen Station

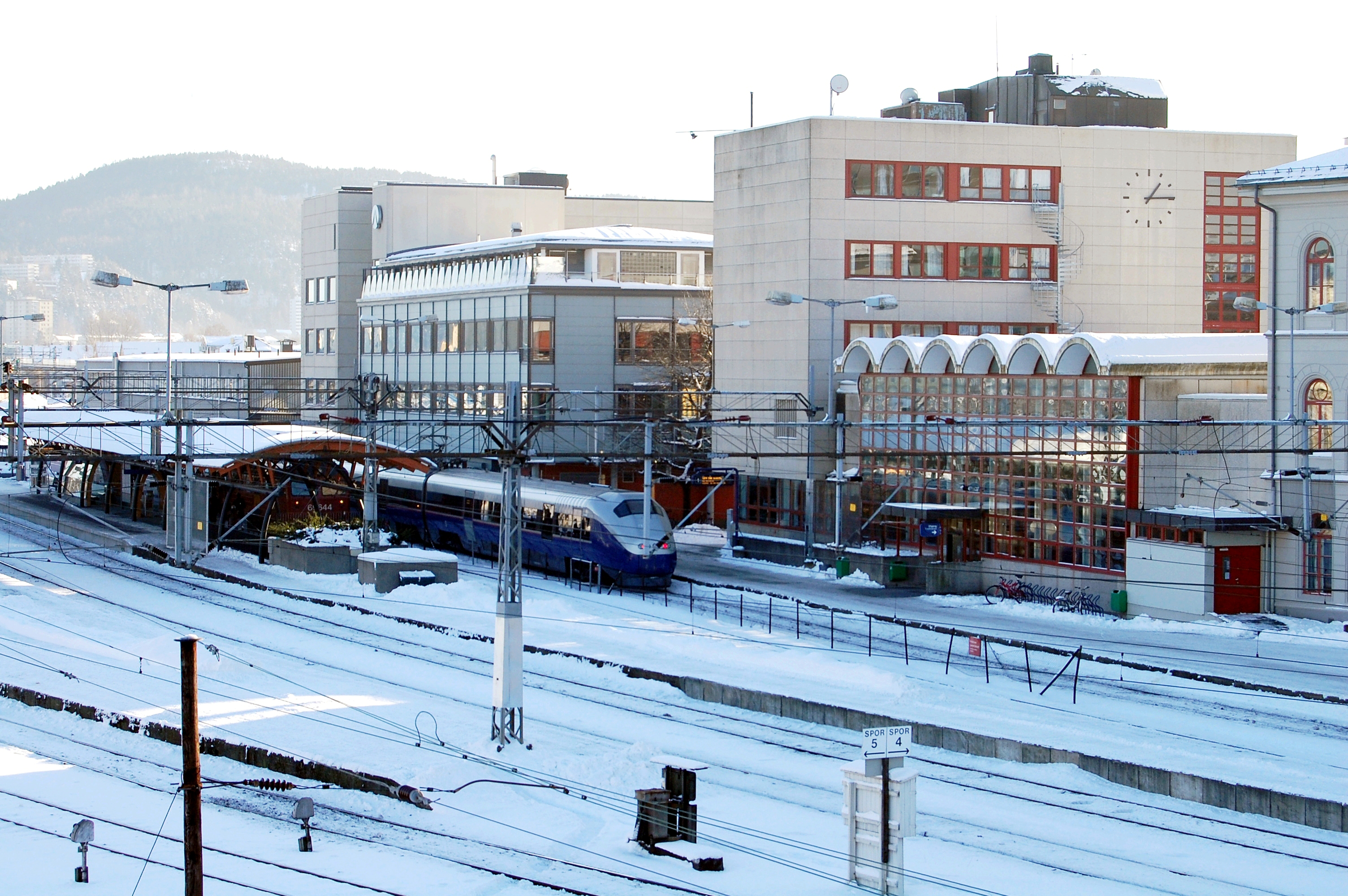
Drammen Station

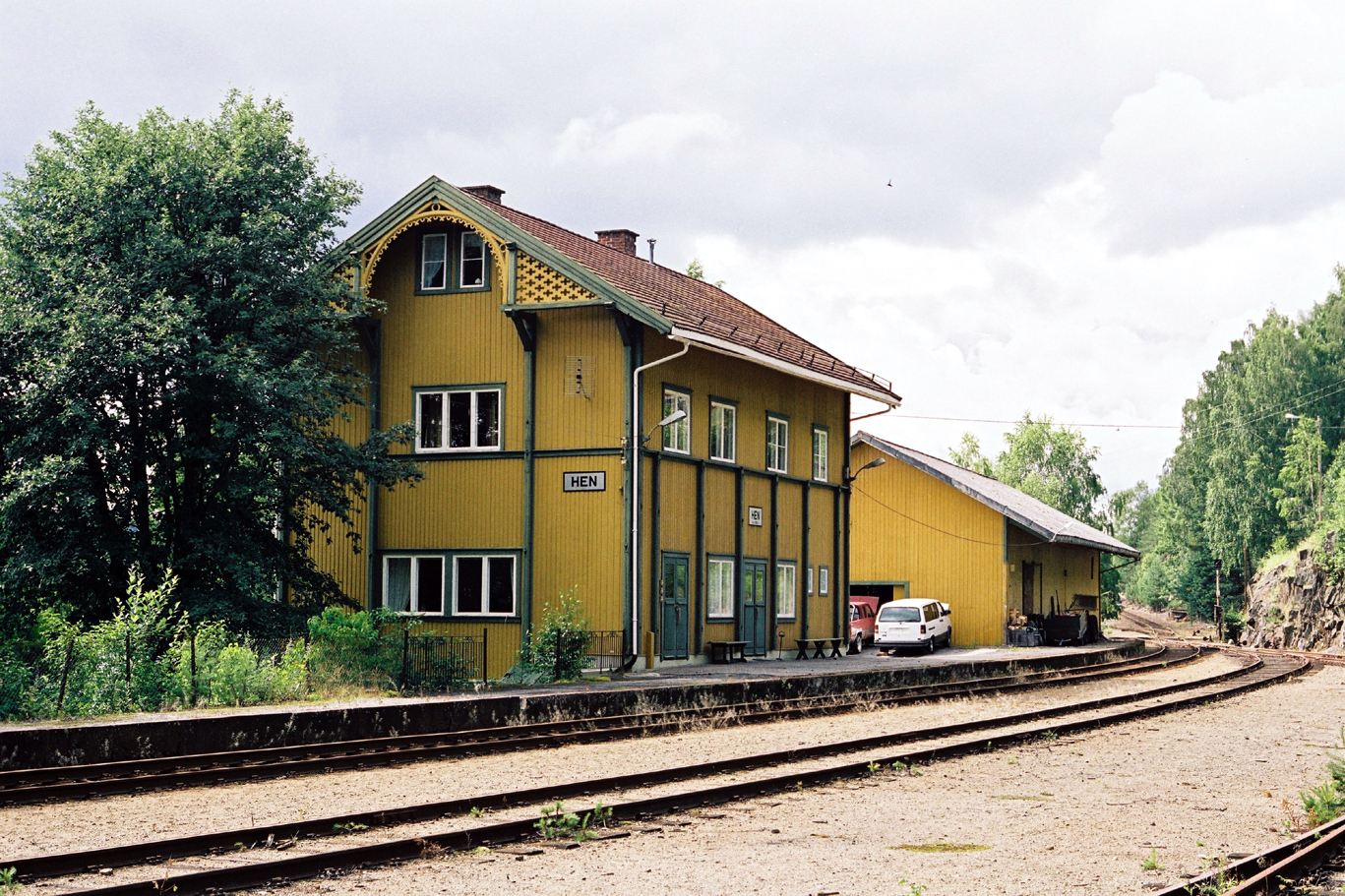
Hen Station

== See also ==
- Narrow gauge railways in Norway

== Bibliography ==
- Berntsen, Ulf; Lund, Thure; Lunner, Dagfinn (1997). På sporet med Krøderkippen (in Norwegian). Norwegian Railway Club / Krøderen Line Foundation. ISBN 82-90286-20-1.
