= Chronology of Norwegian railway lines =

The Norwegian railway network consisted, as of 2008, of 4,114 kilometers (2,556 mi) of line. The Trunk Line opened as Norway's first mainline railway on 1 September 1854.

== List ==
The following table gives a chronological overview of the mainline railway lines in Norway. It explicitly excludes tramway, light rail and metro lines, spurs and industrial lines. It contains the date the section opened, the line the segment is currently considered part of, the name of the line at the time of the opening (if different from the current name). Some railways have simply changed name, while others have been merged with other lines. The table further gives the length of the line, the gauge and number of tracks (single, double or quadruple), all at the time the line opened. Many railway lines have since been shortened and some have been doubled and been through gauge conversion. Standard gauge is 1,435 mm (4 ft 8 1/2 in), CAP gauge is 1,067 mm (3 ft 6 in) and meter gauge is 1,000 mm (3 ft 3 3/8 in). Railway which opened as private are marked, even though many were later nationalized. In later years, many new sections are major realignments, typically tunnels, which shorten an existing line.

†	Realignment of existing line
*	Private

Opened	Line	Historic name	Segment	Length (km)	Length (mi)	Gauge	Tracks
1 September 1854	Trunk*	—	Oslo East – Eidsvoll	67.8	42.1	Standard	Single
23 June 1862	Røros	Hamar–Grundset	Hamar–Grundset	38.1	23.7	CAP	Single
3 October 1862	Kongsvinger	—	Lillestrøm–Kongsvinger	79.1	49.2	Standard	Single
5 August 1864	Dovre	Trondhjem–Støren	Støren–Trondheim	49.2	30.6	CAP	Single
4 November 1865	Kongsvinger	Border	Kongsvinger – Swedish border	35.5	22.1	Standard	Single
15 November 1867	Randsfjorden	—	Vikersund–Drammen	43.1	26.8	CAP	Single
25 November 1867	Randsfjorden	—	Tyristrand–Vikersund	14.8	9.2	CAP	Single
13 October 1868	Randsfjorden	—	Randsfjord–Tyristrand	31.7	19.7	CAP	Single
23 October 1871	Røros	Aamodt	Grundset–Rena	26.3	16.3	CAP	Single
10 November 1871	Sørlandet	Randsfjorden (branch)	Hokksund–Kongsberg	29.2	18.1	CAP	Single
7 October 1872	Drammen	—	Drammen – Oslo West	53.1	33.0	CAP	Single
28 November 1872	Krøderen	—	Krøderen–Vikersund	26.4	16.4	CAP	Single
14 December 1875	Røros	—	Rena–Koppang	56.2	34.9	CAP	Single
4 January 1876	Røros	—	Singsås–Støren	30.4	18.9	CAP	Single
16 January 1877	Røros	—	Røros–Singsås	79.1	49.2	CAP	Single
17 October 1877	Røros	—	Koppang–Røros	152.5	94.8	CAP	Single
1 March 1878	Sørlandet	Jæren	Stavanger–Egersund	76.3	47.4	CAP	Single
2 January 1879	Østfold	Smaalenene	Oslo East – Moss – Halden	136.7	84.9	Standard	Single
25 July 1879	Østfold	Smaalenene	Halden – Swedish border	33.9	21.1	Standard	Single
8 November 1880	Dovre	Eidsvold–Hamar	Eidsvoll–Hamar	58.6	36.4	Standard	Single
17 October 1881	Meråker	—	Trondheim – Swedish border	102.3	63.6	Standard	Single
7 December 1881	Vestfold	Jarlsberg	Larvik–Drammen	103.3	64.2	CAP	Single
7 December 1881	Horten	—	Skoppum–Horten	7.0	4.3	CAP	Single
24 November 1882	Vestfold	Jarlsberg	Skien–Larvik	45.6	28.3	CAP	Single
24 November 1882	Eastern Østfold	Smaalenene	Ski–Mysen–Sarpsborg	80.5	50.0	Standard	Single
11 July 1883	Bergen	Voss	Bergen–Voss	106.7	66.3	CAP	Single
4 June 1884	Dovre	Røros	Selsbakk–Trondheim†	6.3	3.9	CAP	Single
13 October 1892	Sulitjelma*	—	Sjønstå–Fossen	10.4	6.5	750 mm	Single
29 August 1893	Sulitjelma*	—	Fossen–Hellarmo	2.7	1.7	750 mm	Single
3 November 1893	Solør	Kongsvinger–Flisen	Kongsvinger–Flisa	49.2	30.6	Standard	Single
1 July 1894	Nesttun–Os*	—	Osøren–Nesttun	26.3	16.3	750 mm	Single
15 November 1884	Dovre	Hamar–Sel	Hamar–Tretten	88.2	54.8	Standard	Single
16 October 1895	Brevik	—	Brevik–Eidanger	9.4	5.8	CAP	Single
4 June 1896	Lillesand–Flaksvand*	—	Lillesand–Flaksvand	16.6	10.3	CAP	Single
2 November 1896	Dovre	Hamar–Sel	Tretten–Otta	83.0	51.6	Standard	Single
14 November 1896	Urskog–Høland	Høland	Bingfos–Bjørkelangen	25.6	15.9	750 mm	Single
27 November 1896	Setesdal	—	Kristiansand–Bygelandsfjord	79.3	49.3	CAP	Single
15 December 1898	Urskog–Høland*	—	Bjørkelangen–Skulerud	28.8	17.9	750 mm	Single
20 December 1900	Gjøvik	North	Grefsen–Jaren	65.1	40.5	Standard	Single
20 December 1900	Gjøvik	North	Jaren–Røykenvik	6.7	4.2	Standard	Single
20 January 1901	Alnabru–Grefsen	North	Grefsen–Alnabru	4.3	2.7	Standard	Single
21 October 1901	Tønsberg–Eidsfoss*	—	Tønsberg–Eidsfoss	48.0	29.8	CAP	Single
1 February 1902	Nordland	Hell–Sunnan	Hell–Stjørdal	3.0	1.9	Standard	Single
1 October 1902	Holmestrand–Vittingfoss*	—	Holmestrand–Vittingfoss	24.4	15.2	CAP	Single
20 October 1902	Nordland	Hell–Sunnan	Stjørdal–Levanger	49.4	30.7	Standard	Single
15 November 1902	Ofoten	—	Narvik – Swedish border	38.2	23.7	Standard	Single
28 November 1902	Gjøvik	North	Oslo East – Grefsen	6.8	4.2	Standard	Single
28 November 1902	Gjøvik	North	Jaren–Gjøvik	52.0	32.3	Standard	Single
28 November 1902	Skreia	—	Reinsvoll–Skreia	22.0	13.7	Standard	Single
28 November 1902	Valdres*	—	Eina–Dokka	47.0	29.2	Standard	Single
1 November 1903	Valdres*	—	Dokka–Tonsåsen	31.0	19.3	Standard	Single
7 December 1903	Urskog–Høland*	—	Sørumsand–Bingfos	2.4	1.5	750 mm	Single
15 July 1904	Lier*	—	Lier–Svangerstrand	20.6	12.8	CAP	Single
1 November 1904	Nordland	Hell–Sunnan	Levanger–Verdal	12.4	7.7	Standard	Single
15 July 1904	Flekkefjord	—	Egersund–Flekkefjord	72.8	45.2	CAP	Single
1 November 1904	Nordland*	Dunderland	Tverråsen–Storfoshei	22.0	13.7	Standard	Single
11 October 1905	Valdres*	—	Tonsåsen–Aurdal	18.0	11.2	Standard	Single
15 November 1905	Nordland	Hell–Sunnan	Verdal–Sunnan	40.4	25.1	Standard	Single
11 October 1906	Valdres*	—	Aurdal–Fagernes	12.6	7.8	Standard	Single
1 May 1907	Loenga–Alnabru	—	Loenga–Alnabru	6.5	4.0	Standard	Single
16 September 1907	Grimstad*	—	Rise–Grimstad	22.1	13.7	CAP	Single
13 November 1907	Oslo Port	—	Oslo West – Oslo East	22.1	13.7	Dual	Single
10 June 1908	Bergen	—	Voss–Gulsvik	224.6	139.6	Standard	Single
15 July 1908	Thamshavn*	—	Svorkmo–Thamshavn	19.3	12.0	Meter	Single
9 August 1909	Rjukan*	—	Rjukan–Mæl	16.0	9.9	Standard	Single
9 August 1909	Tinnoset*	—	Tinnoset–Notodden	30.0	18.6	Standard	Single
1 December 1909	Bergen	—	Gulsvik–Roa	83.0	51.6	Standard	Single
15 May 1910	Thamshavn*	—	Løkken–Svorkmo	6.0	3.7	Meter	Single
15 May 1910	Kirkenes–Bjørnevatn*	—	Kirkenes–Bjørnevatn	7.5	4.7	Standard	Single
4 December 1910	Solør	—	Flisa–Elverum	44.4	27.6	Standard	Single
18 December 1910	Arendal	Arendal–Treungen	Arendal–Åmli	58.1	36.1	CAP	Single
4 December 1910	Dovre	—	Otta–Dombås	46.1	28.6	Standard	Single
14 December 1913	Arendal	Arendal–Treungen	Åmli–Treungen	33.2	20.6	CAP	Single
15 June 1915	Sulitjelma*	—	Hellarmo–Fagerli	11.8	7.3	CAP	Single
17 December 1917	Bratsberg	—	Eikonrød–Notodden	56.0	34.8	Standard	Single
1918	Solbergfoss*	—	Askim–Solbergfoss	7.9	4.9	Standard	Single
15 October 1918	Vestmarka	—	Skotterud–Vestmarka	14.3	8.9	Standard	Single
11 February 1920	Sørlandet	—	Hjuksebø–Kongsberg	36.9	22.9	Standard	Single
21 September 1921	Dovre	—	Dombås–Støren	158.1	98.2	Standard	Single
18 December 1922	Sørlandet	—	Gvarv–Nordagutu	10.6	6.6	Standard	Single
30 November 1924	Rauma	—	Dombås–Åndalsnes	114.2	71.0	Standard	Single
1 December 1924	Sørlandet	—	Bø–Gvarv	6.9	4.3	Standard	Single
21 December 1924	Ålgård	—	Ålgård–Ganddal	12.1	7.5	CAP	Single
15 December 1925	Sørlandet	—	Lunde–Bø	14.1	8.8	Standard	Single
2 August 1926	Sperillen	—	Hen–Sperillen	23.9	14.9	Standard	Single
30 October 1926	Nordland	—	Sunnan–Snåsa	45.1	28.0	Standard	Single
20 November 1927	Numedal	—	Kongsberg–Rødberg	92.9	57.7	Standard	Single
2 December 1927	Sørlandet	—	Neslandsvatn–Lunde	43.2	26.8	Standard	Single
2 December 1927	Kragerø	Sørlandet	Kragerø–Neslandsvatn	26.6	16.5	Standard	Single
30 November 1929	Nordland	—	Snåsa–Grong	38.0	23.6	Standard	Single
1 November 1933	Namsos	—	Grong–Namsos	51.5	32.0	Standard	Single
1 April 1935	Hardanger	—	Granvin–Voss	27.5	17.1	Standard	Single
10 November 1935	Sørlandet	—	Nelaug–Neslandsvatn	60.7	37.7	Standard	Single
22 June 1938	Sørlandet	—	Grovane–Nelaug	63.9	39.7	Standard	Single
5 July 1940	Nordland	—	Grong–Mosjøen	186.5	115.9	Standard	Single
15 March 1941	Nordland	—	Mosjøen–Elsfjord	41.6	25.8	Standard	Single
15 October 1941	Flåm	—	Flåm–Myrdal	20.4	12.7	Standard	Single
20 February 1942	Nordland	—	Elsfjord–Bjerka	21.1	13.1	Standard	Single
20 March 1942	Nordland	—	Bjerka – Mo i Rana	9.3	5.8	Standard	Single
15 May 1942	Nordland	—	Mo i Rana – Tverrånes	2.9	1.8	Standard	Single
12 April 1943	Nordland	—	Storforshei–Grønnfjelldal	4.3	2.7	Standard	Single
17 December 1943	Sørlandet	—	Sira–Tronviken	5.7	3.5	Standard	Single
1 March 1944	Flekkefjord	—	Sira–Sirnes	3.0	1.9	Standard	Single
1 March 1944	Sørlandet	—	Sira–Kristiansand	102.8	63.9	Standard	Single
1 May 1945	Nordland	—	Grønnfjelldal–Dunderland	15.7	9.8	Standard	Single
10 December 1947	Nordland	—	Dunderland–Lønsdal	59.1	36.7	Standard	Single
1 December 1955	Nordland	—	Lønsdal–Røkland	32.3	20.1	Standard	Single
20 December 1956	Sulitjelma	—	Åglifjell–Finneid	16.4	10.2	CAP	Single
2 June 1957	Stavne–Leangen	—	Stavne–Leangen	5.8	3.6	Standard	Single
1 December 1958	Nordland	—	Røkland–Fauske	39.8	24.7	Standard	Single
1 February 1962	Nordland	—	Fauske–Bodø	54.5	33.9	Standard	Single
1 August 1964	Bergen	—	Bergen–Arna†	11.9	7.4	Standard	Single
3 June 1973	Drammen	—	Brakerøy–Asker†	15.2	9.4	Standard	Double
1 June 1980	Drammen	—	Skøyen–Oslo	15.2	9.4	Standard	Double
30 November 1989	Østfold	—	Tveter–Vestby†	4.0	2.5	Standard	Double
29 June 1990	Østfold	—	Vestby–Rustad†	1.6	0.99	Standard	Double
1 September 1992	Østfold	—	Ås†	1.6	0.99	Standard	Double
16 June 1993	Bergen	—	Høgheller–Finse†	12.5	7.8	Standard	Single
8 October 1993	Østfold	—	Ås–Tveter†	4.1	2.5	Standard	Double
28 May 1994	Østfold	—	Ski–Ås†	5.6	3.5	Standard	Double
17 October 1995	Vestfold	—	Skoger†	4.7	2.9	Standard	Double
19 October 1995	Bergen	—	Kongsnut†	3.5	2.2	Standard	Single
17 October 1995	Drammen	—	Drammen–Brakerøya†	4.7	2.9	Standard	Double
1 July 1996	Østfold	—	Kambo–Sandbukta†	3.8	2.4	Standard	Double
23 September 1996	Østfold	—	Rustad–Hølen†	8.8	5.5	Standard	Double
10 October 1996	Bergen	—	Uksabotn†	3.5	2.2	Standard	Single
22 October 1996	Østfold	—	Hølen–Kambo†	3.5	2.2	Standard	Double
12 October 1997	Bergen	—	Larsbu†	1.7	1.1	Standard	Single
20 September 1998	Bergen	—	Storurdi†	2.3	1.4	Standard	Single
8 October 1998	Gardermoen	—	Lillestrøm–Eidsvoll	47.4	29.5	Standard	Double
22 August 1999	Gardermoen	—	Etterstad–Lillestrøm	14.8	9.2	Standard	Double
27 November 1999	Bergen	—	Gråskallen†	5.2	3.2	Standard	Single
16 December 1999	Drammen	—	Nationaltheatret†	1.0	0.62	Standard	Quadruple
28 June 2000	Vestfold	—	Såstad–Haug†	7.0	4.3	Standard	Double
3 October 2001	Vestfold	—	Nykirke†	1.2	0.75	Standard	Double
23 October 2001	Vestfold	—	Holm–Bergsenga†	12.5	7.8	Standard	Double
1 August 2005	Asker	—	Asker–Sandvika	9.7	6.0	Standard	Double
15 August 2011	Nordland	—	Hommelvik–Hell†	5.7	3.5	Standard	Single
26 August 2011	Asker	—	Sandvika–Lysaker	6.7	4.2	Standard	Double
7 November 2011	Vestfold	—	Tønsberg–Barkåker†	7.8	4.8	Standard	Double
