= Vestby Station =

Railway station in Vestby, Norway

Vestby
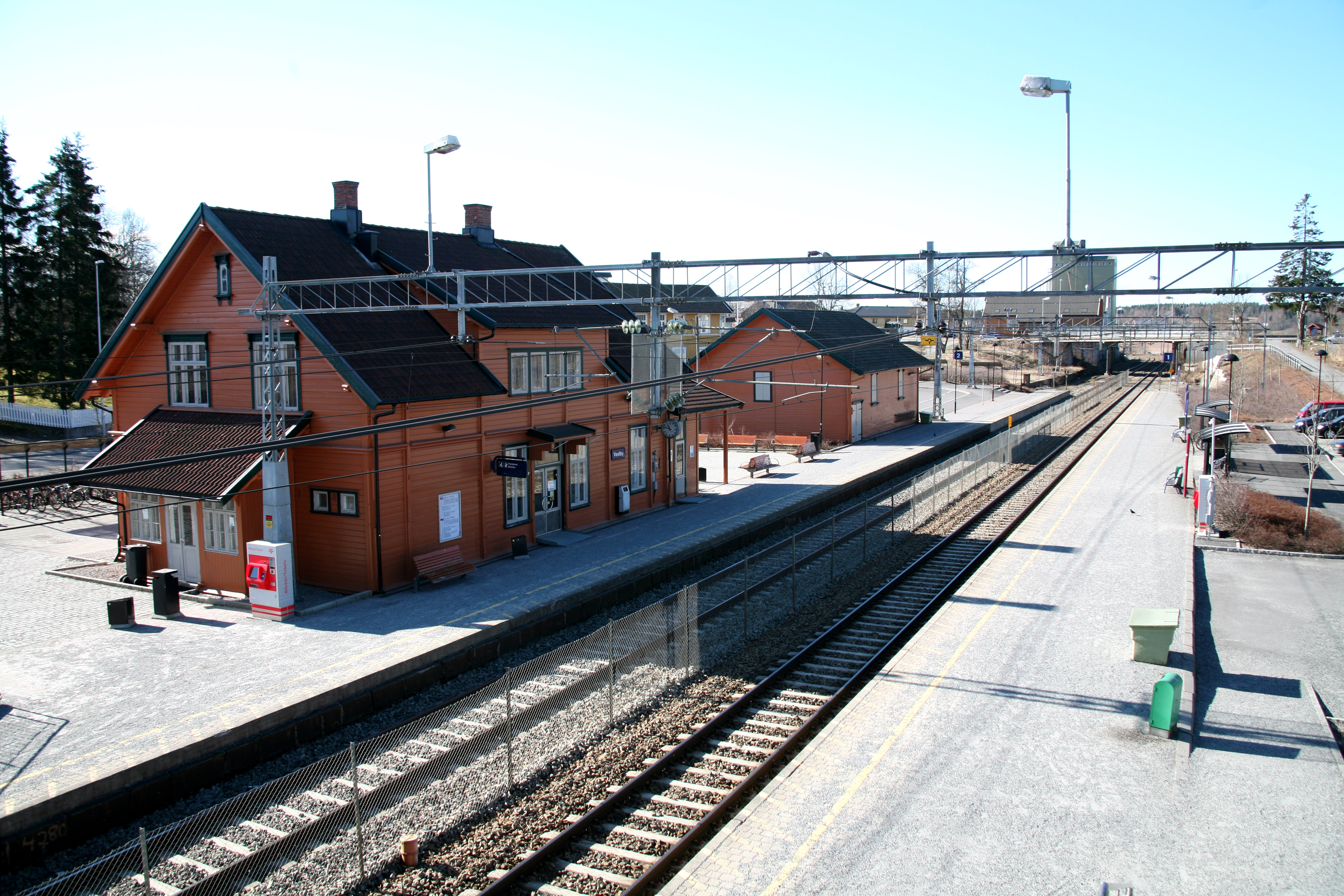

General information
- Location: Vestby, Norway
- Coordinates: 59°36′14″N 10°44′55″E
- Elevation: 59 m (194 ft) asl
- Owner: Bane NOR
- Operator: Vy
- Line: Østfoldbanen
- Distance: 38.65 km (24.02 mi)
- Platforms: 2
- Connections: Bus: 921, 922, 931, 932 and 519 (night route)

Construction
- Architect: Peter A. Blix

Other information
- Station code: VBY

History
- Opened: 1878
Location

Vestby Station (Norwegian: Vestby stasjon) is a railway station on the Østfold Line located in the village of Vestby, Norway. It is served by commuter trains operated by Vy running from Oslo to Moss. The station opened in 1879, and was modernised in the early 1990s. It features a passenger walkway built in gluelam connecting its two platforms and a small parking lot with place for approximately 120 cars. In 1950 the station served about 160 passengers to Oslo each day. Today the number are 2-3000.

== History ==
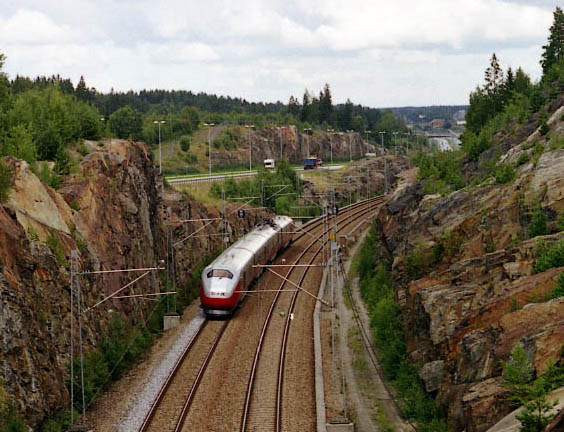
Class 73b train on the double-track section of the Østfold Line near Vestby

The station was opened in 1879 as a halt on the Smaalens Line, now known as the western branch of the Østfold Line. The station building was designed by the Norwegian architect Peter Andreas Blix in the same Swiss cottage style as the stations Ås and Såner. In the 1950s, the station was frequently used by weekend guests from Oslo that visited the nearby conurbation Hvitsten for having a bath. A few years after the section of the Østfold Line between Ski and Moss Station was upgraded to double tracks, Vestby Station received a major renovation. A regulation plan for the station area was published in May 2010, which involved increasing the number of car parking places.

In 2005, the station was subject of a terrorist attack. A non-Norwegian man had called the Norwegian police 7.49 in the morning, claiming that he had planted a bomb on the station which would detonate 8.00, eleven minutes later. All traffic on the Østfold Line was stopped, and the station investigated, but no bombs were found.

Vestby Station has seen several accidents and injuries. In January 2004, a Linx train from Gothenburg, travelling at 130 kilometres per hour (81 mph), crashed into a plowing car that was partly parked on the railway tracks at Vestby. No passengers were hurt in the accident. It was victim of sabotage in March 2004, when some local youth laid steel pipes over the tracks. In 2006, a two-year-old boy fell down from the platform and was run over by a passing train. In June 2010, the station building caught fire in the middle of the night, but left no injuries.

== Facilities ==
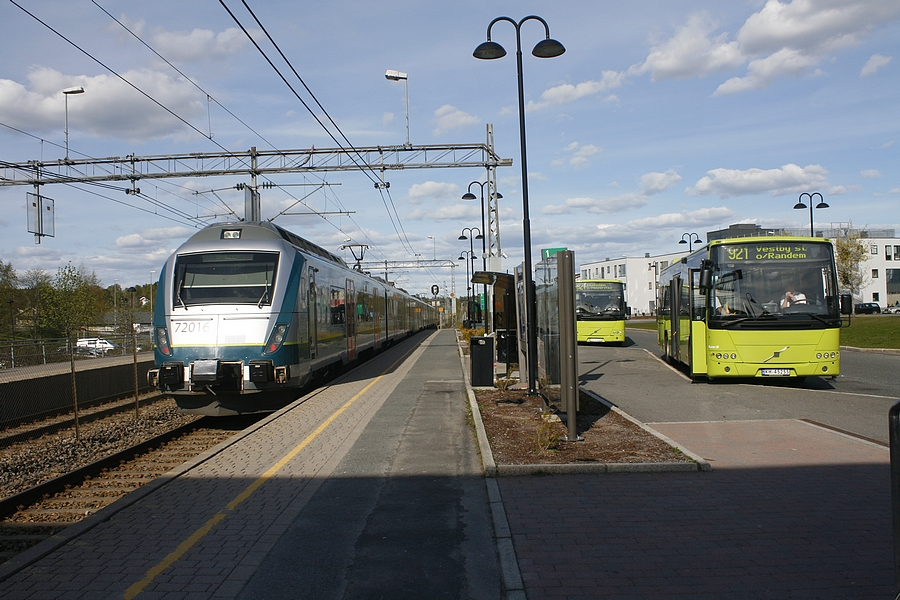
NSB Class 72 train and Ruter buses at the station

The station received a major overhaul after the Østfold Line was extended to double track in the 1990s. The station was redesigned in the same architectural style as the preceding station Ås, with a modern walkway over the tracks. The walkway is built in gluelam, and shapes together with the stairways down to the platforms one minimalistic construction.

A bus stop is located on the east side of the station, and a park and ride facility with space for up to 120 cars on the west side. There is also a taxi stand at the station. The station building features a small kiosk. The platforms have sheds and ticket machines. The station is located north of Sonsveien and south of Ås Station, 38.65 kilometres (24.02 mi) from Oslo Central Station.

== Service ==
Vestby Station is served by the line R21 of the Oslo Commuter Rail, which is operated by Vy. The line runs from Oslo to Moss. The service has two southbound stations before reaching Moss: Sonsveien and Kambo. Travel time to Oslo Central Station is 33 minutes and to Moss 16 minutes. The public transport authority Ruter operates bus services to the station from conurbations around Vestby.

Preceding station			Following station
Ås	Østfold Line		Sonsveien
Preceding station	Local trains		Following station
Ås	R21	Oslo S–Moss	Sonsveien
