= Såner Station =

Former railway station in Vestby, Norway

Coordinates: 59°31′49″N 10°44′15″E

Såner
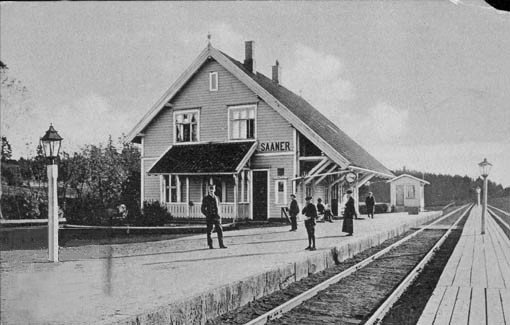
- Såner Station in the 1910s

General information
- Location: Såner, Vestby; Norway
- Owner: Norwegian State Railways
- Line: Østfold Line
- Distance: 47.92 km (29.78 mi) from Oslo Central
- Platforms: 2

Construction
- Architect: Peter Andreas Blix

History
- Opened: 2 January 1879
- Closed: 21 September 1996
Location

Såner Station (Norwegian: Såner stasjon) was a railway station on the Østfold Line in Norway. It was located between Hølen and Sonsveien Station in the Såner village in the Municipality of Vestby. Designed by Peter A. Blix in Swiss chalet style, it was opened on 2 January 1879. The station was closed on 21 September 1996, when the section between Rustad and Kambo Station was upgraded to double tracks.

== History ==
The western branch of the Østfold Line opened on 2 January 1879 while the eastern branch opened on 24 November 1882. Såner Station was located on the western branch, and was originally named "Soner", but had its name changed to "Saaner" in April 1894. In April 1921, it had its name changed to "Såner". On 15 May 1893, it was decided to install a morse lamp at the station. Centralized semaphores were decided on 23 January 1900, as an experiment to gain knowledge of the system.

The station became unstaffed on 1 January 1973 and was closed on 21 June 1996. The line was replaced by a double tracked line allowing speeds up to 160 kilometres per hour (99 mph). In 2003, a family bought the station with head house for 1.3 million kr.

== Facilities and location ==
The facilities of Såner Station were designed by Peter A. Blix in Swiss chalet style. The head house featured two storeys and a basement, which together constituted 180 square metres (1,900 sq ft) of ground area. An outhouse and a timber shed were also located at the station. The Såner Church is located east of the station. It burned down in 1995 and was reerected in 2000.

Preceding station		Following station
Hølen	Østfold Line	Sonsveien
