= VBY =

VBY may refer to:

- VBY, the IATA airport code for Visby Airport, Gotland, Sweden
- VBY, the Stockholm Metro station code for Vällingby metro station, Stockholm, Sweden
- VBY, the station code for Vestby Station, Norway
