= Ås Station =

Railway station in Ås, Norway

Ås
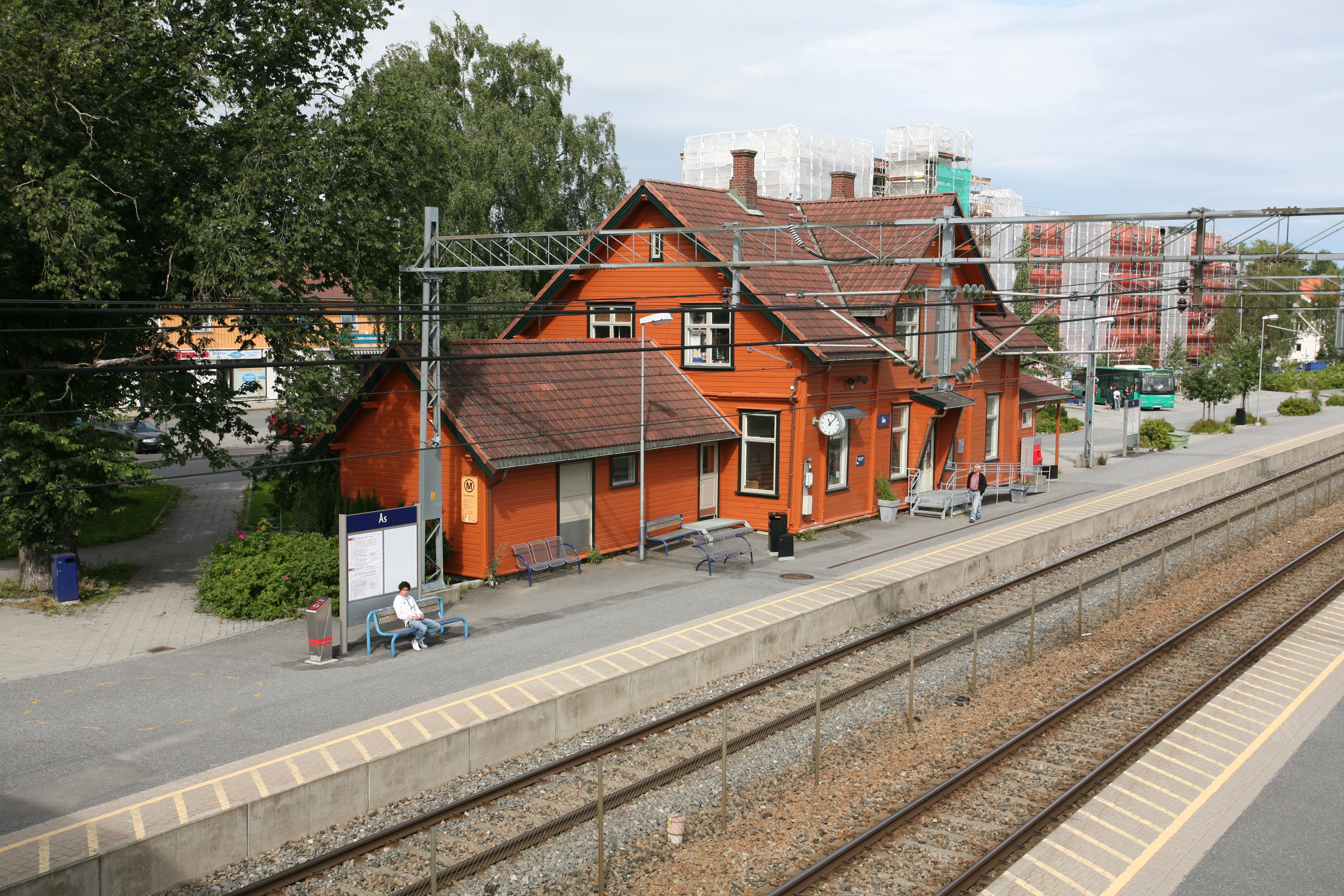

General information
- Location: Ås, Norway
- Coordinates: 59°39′47″N 10°47′40″E
- Elevation: 94.2 m (309 ft) amsl
- Owner: Bane NOR
- Operator: Vy
- Line: Østfold Line
- Distance: 31.15 km (19.36 mi)
- Platforms: 2
- Connections: Bus: 519, 562, 906, 912, 913, 914 and 915

Construction
- Architect: Peter Andreas Blix

History
- Opened: 2 January 1879
Location

Ås Station (Norwegian: Ås stasjon) is a railway station in Ås, Norway on the Østfold Line. The station was opened on 2 January 1879 and designed by Peter A. Blix in Swiss chalet style. The station was modernized in 1992, when the section between Ski and Moss was upgraded to double track and speeds up to 160 kilometres per hour (99 mph). In 2006, a cultural meeting place comprising a café, concert hall and an art exhibition was established inside the station's building, initiated by the local organization "Galleri Texas" and to the governmental corporation Follo Futura. Galleri Texas and Follo Futura had been arguing a while over how the operating of the café should be, and in 2010, all the maintenance and operation of the meeting place were transferred entirely from Galleri Texas to Follo Futura, since Galleri Texas no longer were satisfied with Follo Futuras work. The station is served by commuter trains on the Line L21 of the Oslo Commuter Rail, running from Stabekk over Oslo to Moss. Ski Station and Vestby Station are the preceding and the following stations, respectively.

== History ==
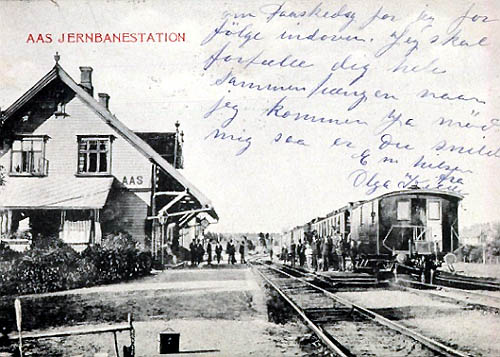
Ås Station in 1902

The station opened on 2 January 1879, and was designed by the Norwegian architect Peter Andreas Blix in Swiss chalet style. The Norwegian author Knut Hamsun wrote several letters at the station between 1897 and 1906. When the section between Ski and Moss Station was upgraded to double tracks in 1992, Ås Station received a major renovation. In 2000, a 16-year-old boy had huffed lighter gas at the station, and was found dead on the platform the next morning. On 25 October 2006, a cultural meeting place was established inside the station building, initiated by the association "Galleri Texas". The building is located in Brekkeveien 4, and houses a tiny café known as "Kafé Åsheim", an art gallery, and a small gift shop. The café serves local commuters riding to Oslo in the morning, as well as dining and lunch guests residing in the area around the station. In the weekends, there are sometimes arranged concerts with local bands and musicians.

In 2008, controversy between the local organisation Galleri Texas and the state-owned corporation Follo Futura arose, regarding the hiring contract of the station building, and which of them were to operate the cultural meeting place. Follo Futura, which together with the Norwegian National Rail Administration and Rom Eiendom officially owned the station building wanted to take over the café business. They argued that they were better fit to operate it, since Galleri Texas did not have the economical capacity to run the café with the art exhibition and gift shop the whole week. The local community wanted Galleri Texas to operate the café, arguing that replacing a local company for a governmental one would weaken the local and patriotic spirit of the café. On 1 January 2010, the operation of the café and the cultural meeting place was transferred from Galleri Texas to Follo Futura, since Galleri Texas no longer could pay the rental costs. In 2010, smoke was tumbling out of the station, but it turned out that it was only a cigarette that had not been quenched, and had been laying overnight in a flower basket.

== Facilities ==
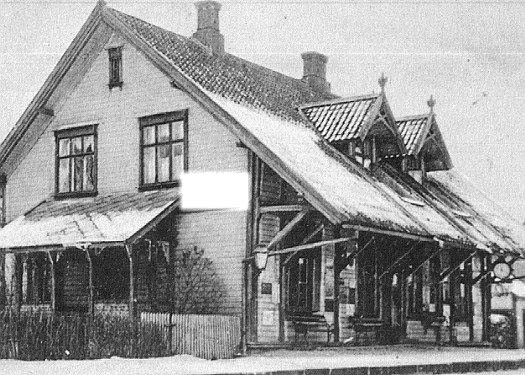
The station building in 1905

The station's facilities are designed similarly to most of the other stations on the Østfold Line, apart from the station building, which dates back to 1877. There is step-free access to the platforms. There is a glulam walkway over the rail tracks in the south end of the station, which shapes together with the stairways one minimalistic construction down to the platforms. At the north end of the station, there is a second walkway which runs under the tracks. There are sheds and ticket machines on the platforms. The station's parking area has room for 200 cars and 8 bicycles. Akershus Kollektivterminaler operates a bus terminal a few metres away from the station. Ås Station is located north of Vestby Station and south of Ski Station on the Østfold Line, 31.15 kilometres (19.36 mi) from Oslo Central Station.

== Service ==
Ås Station is served by the line L21 of the Oslo Commuter Rail, operated by Vy. The line runs from Stabekk through Oslo to Moss. The travel time from Ås to Oslo Central Station is 28 minutes and to Moss Station 21 minutes. The public transport authority Ruter operates feeder bus services to the station from Drøbak, Ski, Vinterbro and other conurbations around Ås.

| Preceding station | | | Following station |
|---|---|---|---|
| Ski | Østfold Line | | Vestby |
| Preceding station | Local trains | | Following station |
| Ski | R21 | Oslo S–Moss | Vestby |
