= Sonsveien Station =

Railway halt in Vestby, Norway

Sonsveien
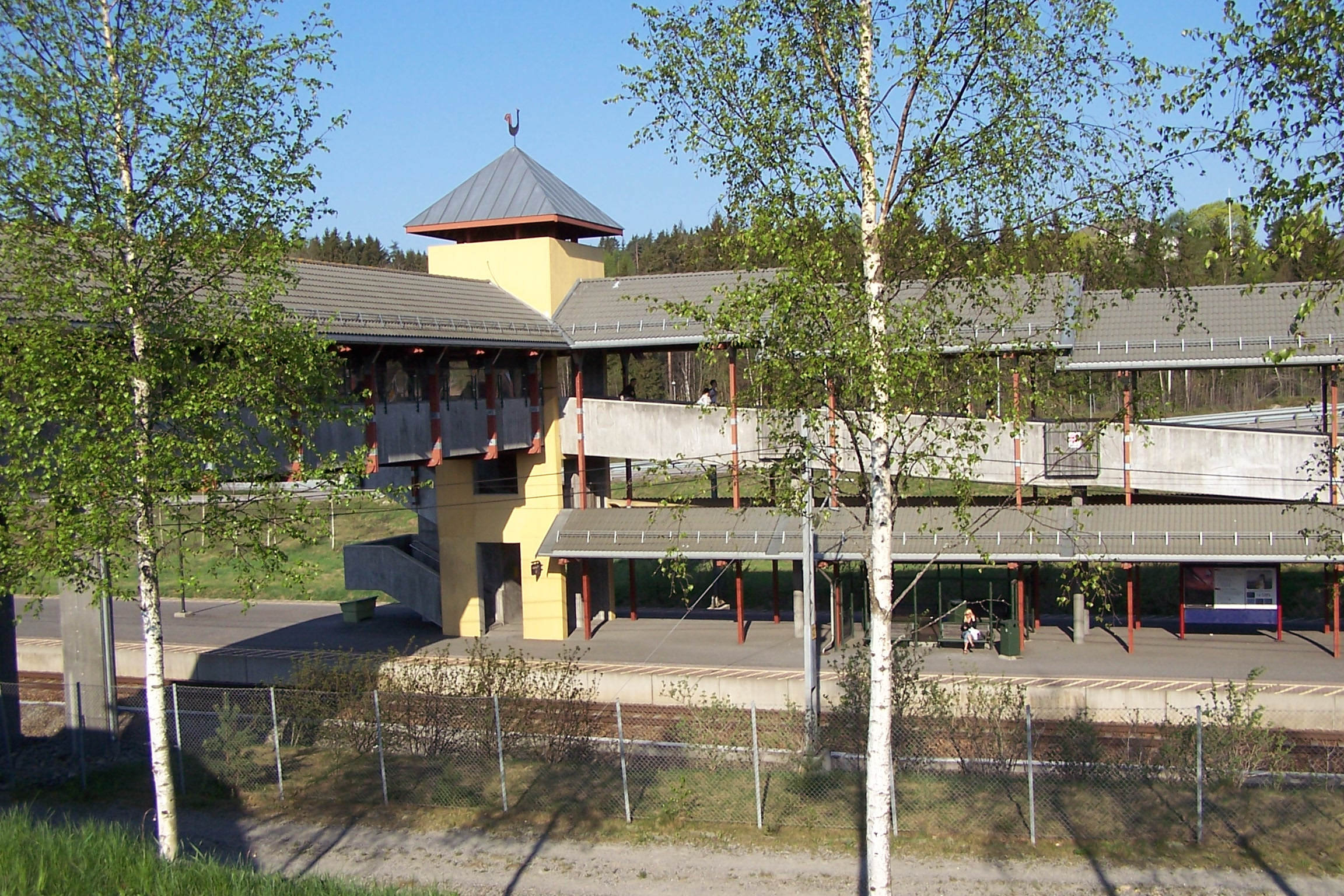

General information
- Location: Son, Vestby; Norway
- Coordinates: 59°30′55″N 10°43′32″E
- Elevation: 59 m (194 ft)
- Owner: Bane NOR
- Operator: Vy
- Line: Østfold Line
- Distance: 48.88 km
- Platforms: 2

History
- Opened: 1996
Location

Sonsveien holdeplass is a railway halt on the Østfold Line in south-eastern Norway near the village of Son in Vestby municipality. It is served by hourly commuter trains operated by Vy on line R21 between Moss and Oslo.

== History ==
The station was opened in 1996 when the line between Ski and Moss was double-tracked. There had been an earlier Son station on the old single-track line.

Preceding station			Following station
Vestby	Østfold Line		Kambo
Preceding station	Local trains		Following station
Vestby	R21	Oslo S–Moss	Kambo
