= Bø Station =

Railway station in Bø, Norway

Bø
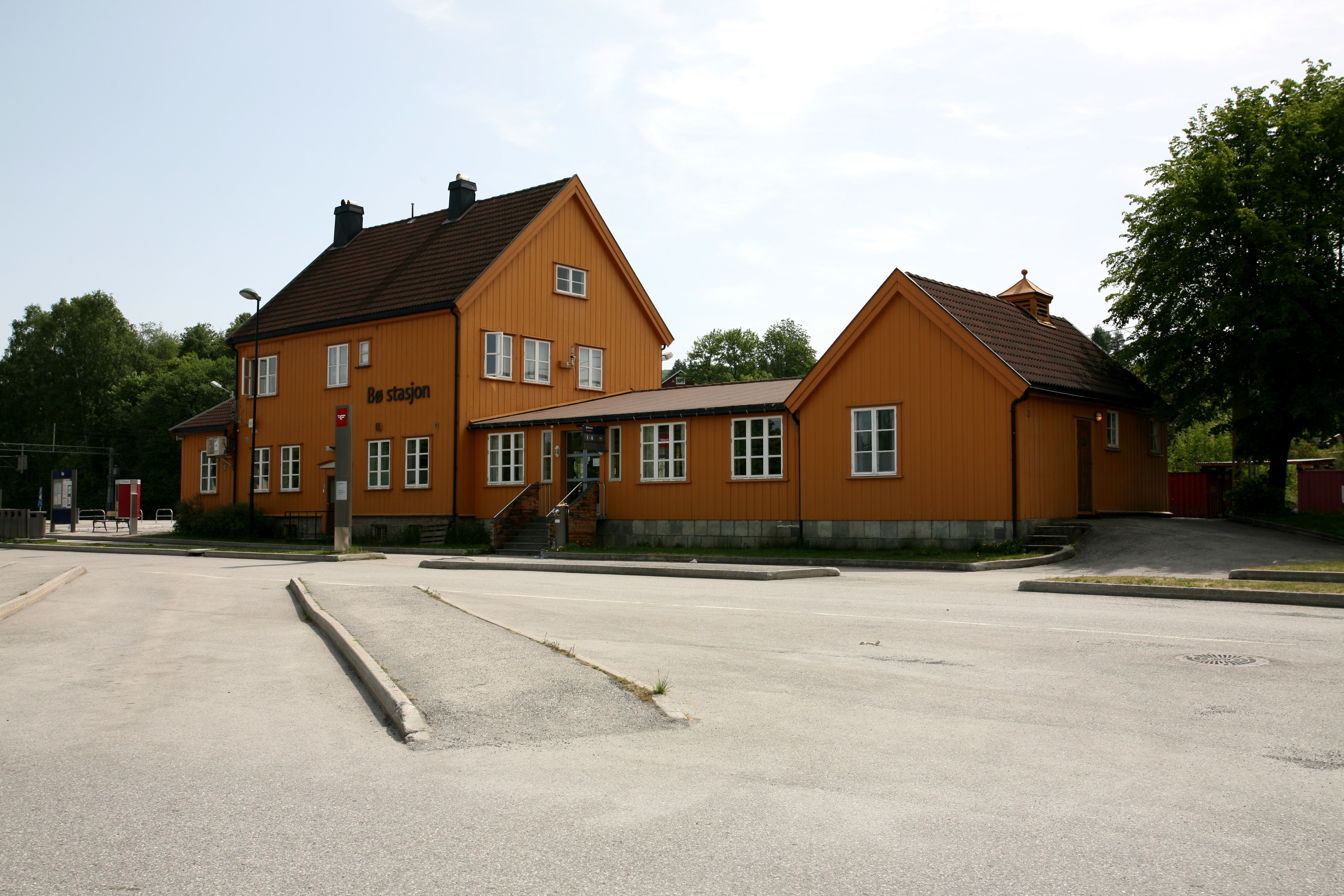

General information
- Location: Bø, Midt-Telemark Municipality; Norway
- Coordinates: 59°24′33″N 09°04′09″E
- Elevation: 69.6 m (228 ft)
- Owner: Bane NOR
- Operator: Go-Ahead Norge
- Line: Sørlandet Line
- Distance: 163.44 km (101.56 mi)
- Platforms: 2
- Connections: Bus service

Other information
- Station code: BØ

History
- Opened: 1 December 1924
Location
- Location within Norway

Bø Station (Norwegian: Bø stasjon) is a railway station on the Sørlandet Line. It is located in the village of Bø in Midt-Telemark Municipality in Telemark county, Norway. The station is served by express trains to Kristiansand as well as serving as a major transport hub in western Telemark.

== History ==
The station was opened in 1924 when Sørlandet Line was opened to Bø, and was the terminal station until Lunde Station opened in 1925.

Preceding station	Express trains	Following station
Lunde towards Stavanger	F5	Nordagutu towards Oslo S
