= Mo i Rana Station =

Railway station in Rana, Norway

Mo i Rana
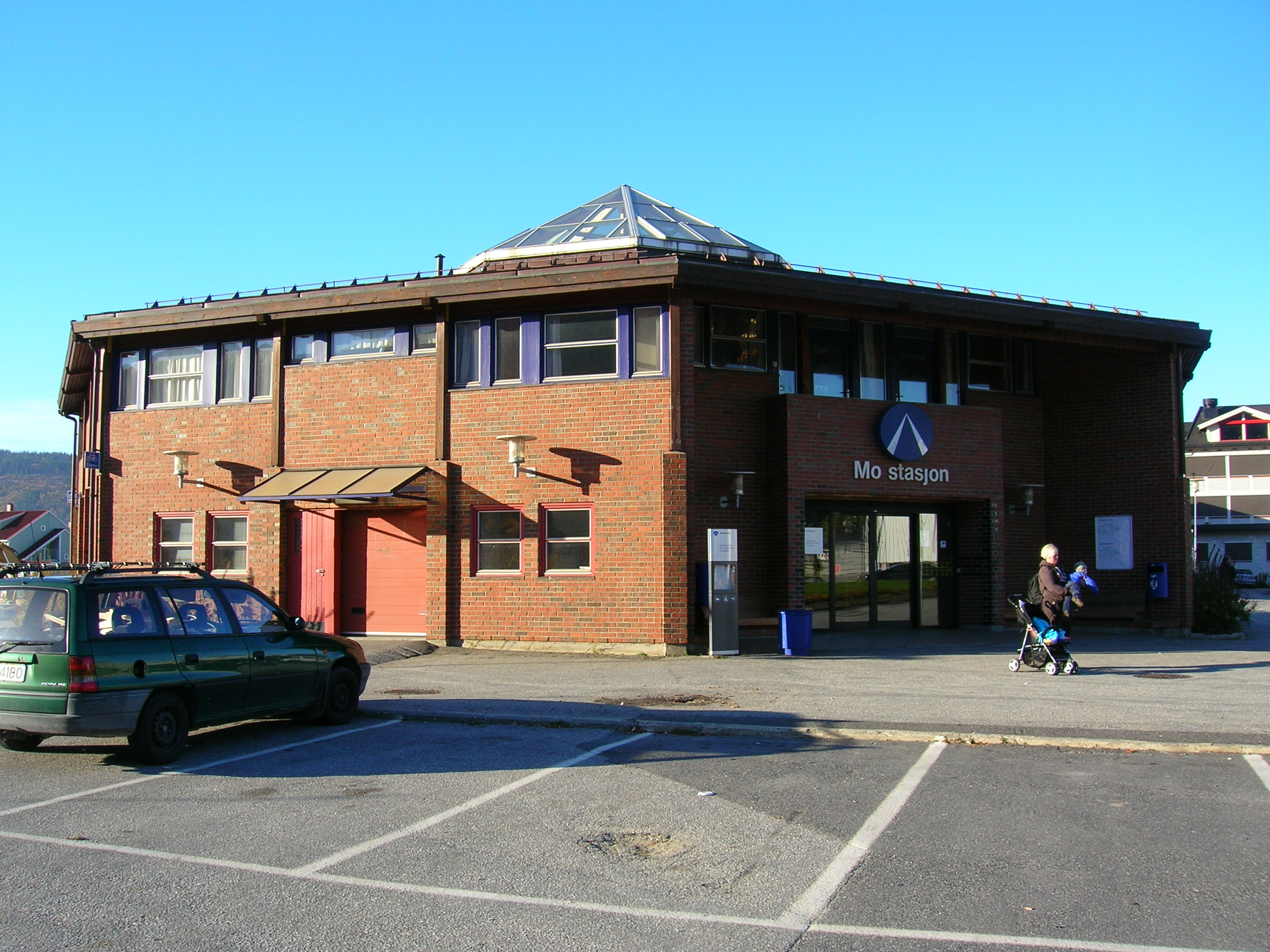

General information
- Location: Mo i Rana, Rana Municipality; Norway
- Coordinates: 66°18′38″N 14°07′58″E
- Elevation: 3.5 m (11 ft) AMSL
- Owner: Bane NOR
- Operator: SJ Norge
- Line: Nordland Line
- Distance: 497.98 km (309.43 mi)
- Platforms: 2

Other information
- Station code: MO

History
- Opened: 1942
Location
- Location within Nordland Location within Norway

Mo i Rana Station (Norwegian: Mo i Rana stasjon) is a railway station located in the town of Mo i Rana in Rana Municipality in Nordland county, Norway. The station is located along the Nordland Line and has been in operation since 1942. Since 10 January 1943, Norsk Spisevognselskap has operated a restaurant at the station. There is one daily express train from Trondheim that terminates at this station. This service uses Class 93 tilting diesel multiple units.

| Preceding station | Express trains | Following station |
|---|---|---|
| Bjerka towards Trondheim S | F7 | Skonseng towards Bodø |
