= Fagernes Station =

Former railway station in Nord-Aurdal, Norway

Coordinates: 60.9855°N 9.2394°E

Fagernes
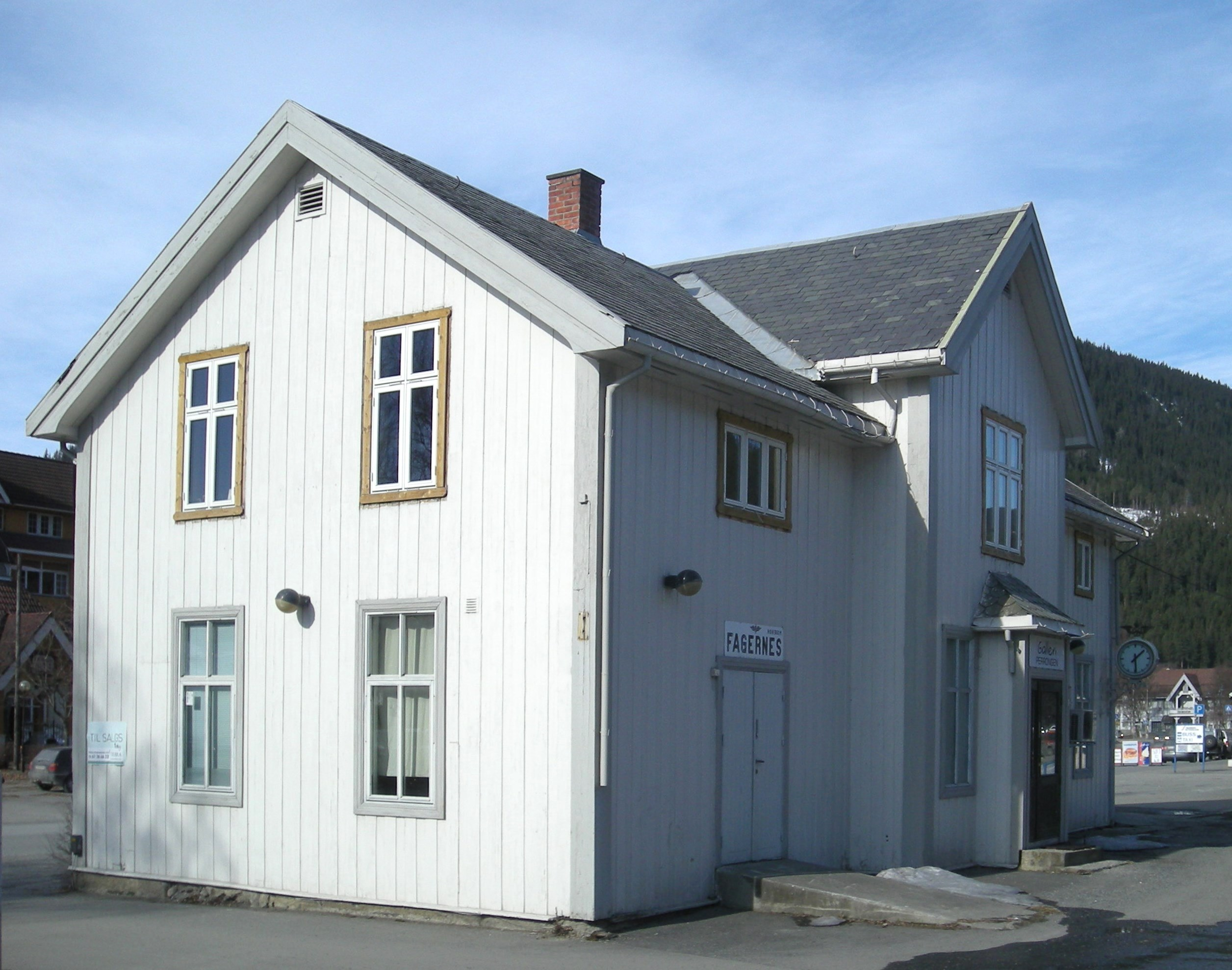
- Fagernes Station

General information
- Location: Fagernes, Nord-Aurdal Municipality; Norway
- Elevation: 360 m (1,180 ft) AMSL
- Owner: Norwegian State Railways
- Line: Valdres Line
- Distance: 208.79 km (129.74 mi)

History
- Opened: 1 October 1906
Location

Fagernes Station (Norwegian: Fagernes stasjon) was a railway station located in the town of Fagernes in Nord-Aurdal Municipality, Norway. It was on the Valdres Line (Valdresbanen) which was in operation from 1902 until 1989.

== History ==
The station was opened on 1 October 1906 by King Haakon VII and remained until the line closed on 1 January 1989. It was 208.79 kilometers (129.74 mi) from Oslo Central Station and 360 meters (1,180 ft) above mean sea level. Originally the restaurant at the station was run by Fagernes Hotel, which is located adjacent to the station. Following the new station building which was built in the early 1950s, Norsk Spisevognselskap took over the operation of the restaurant in the new building.

Preceding station		Following station
Leira	Valdres Line	Terminus
