= Lunde Station =

Railway station in Nome, Norway

Lunde
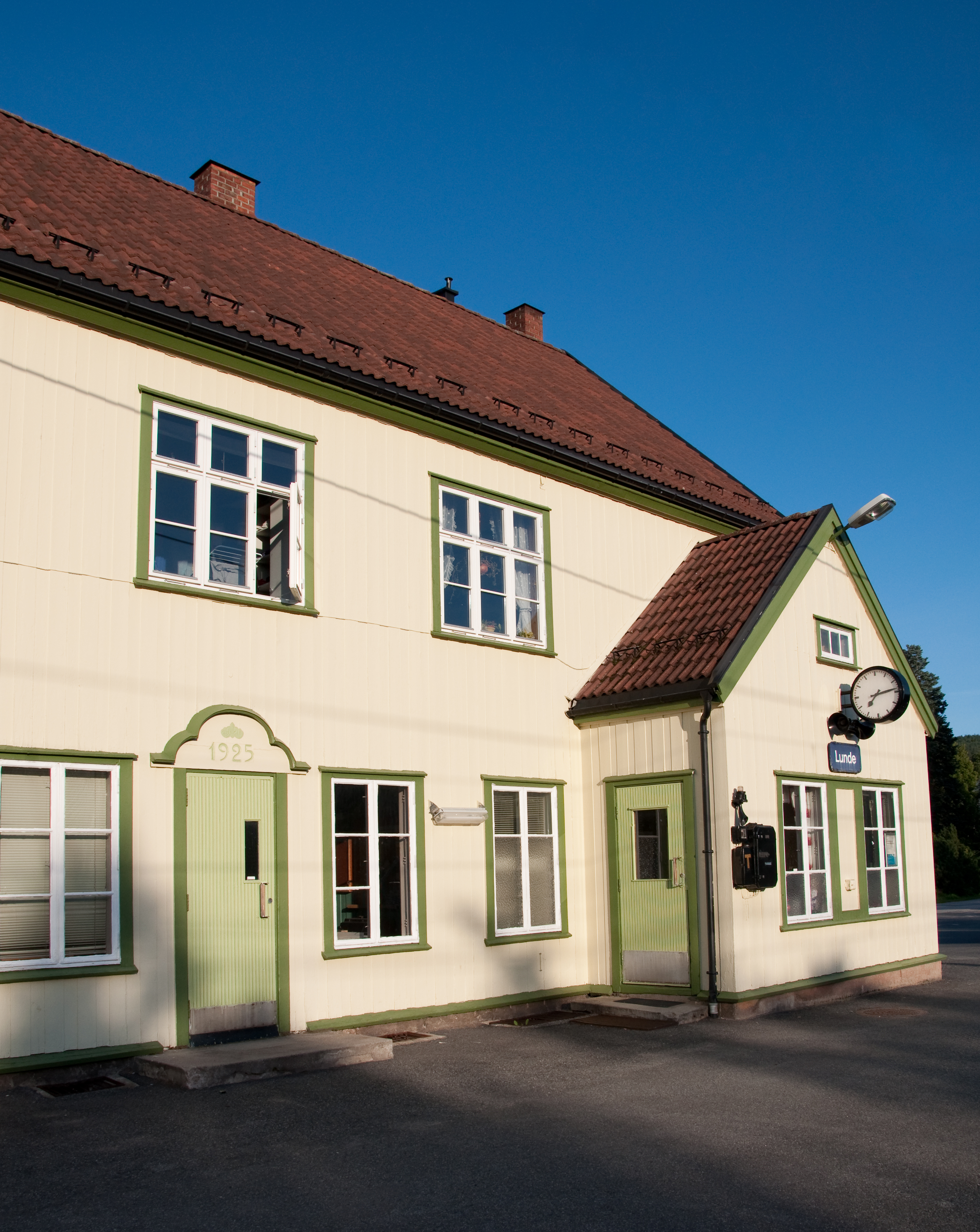

General information
- Location: Lunde, Nome Municipality; Norway
- Coordinates: 59°17′56″N 9°06′03″E
- Elevation: 77.1 m (253 ft)
- Owner: Bane NOR
- Operator: Go-Ahead Norge
- Line: Sørlandet Line
- Distance: 177.48 km
- Platforms: 2
- Connections: Bus service

Other information
- Station code: LUN

History
- Opened: 1925
Location

Lunde Station (Norwegian: Lunde stasjon) is located in Lunde in Nome Municipality, Norway on the Sørlandet Line. The station is served by express trains between Oslo and Stavanger, by the train company GoAhead. There are also a timber loading facility at the station.

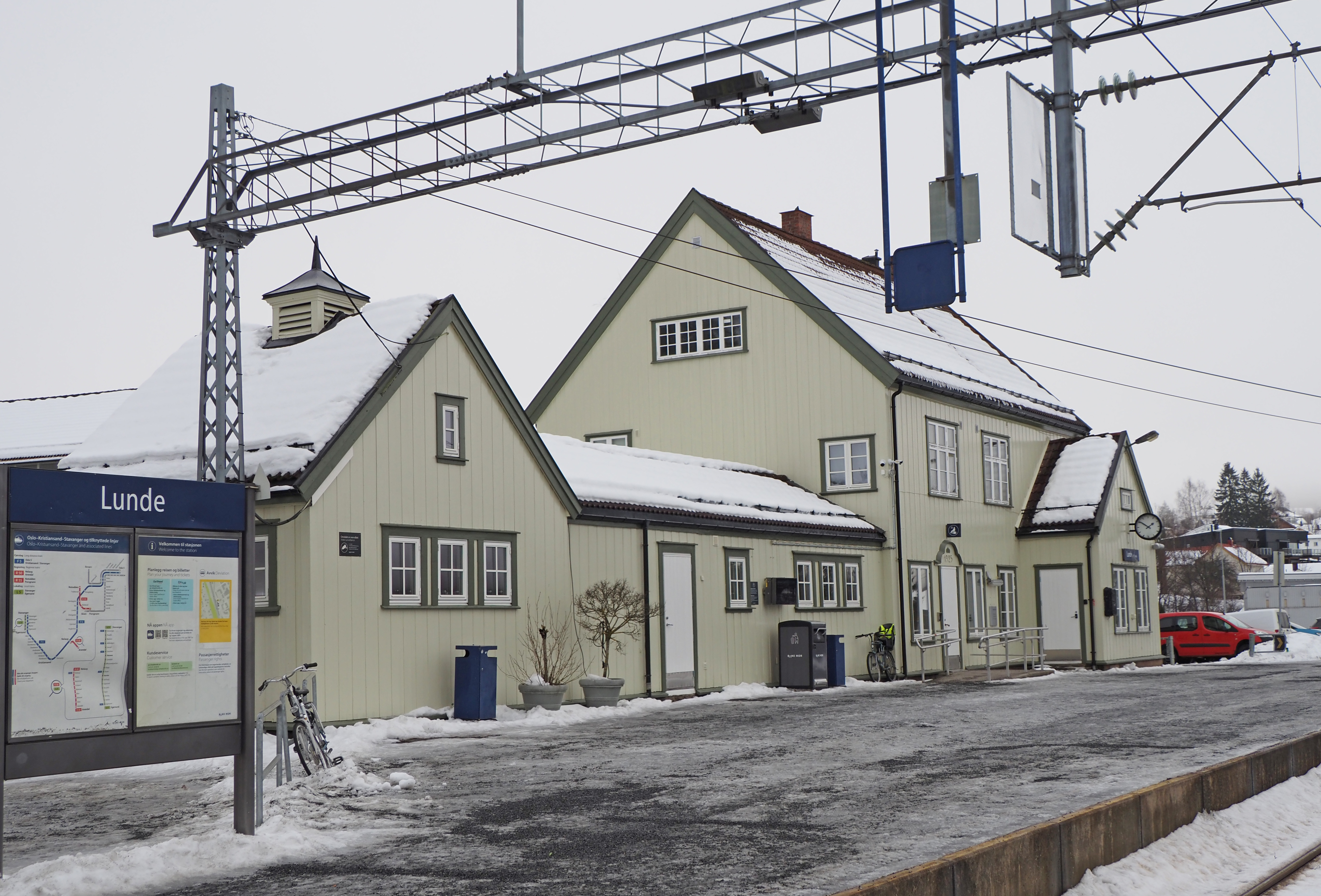
Lunde station

== History ==
The station was opened in 1925 when the Sørlandet Line was opened to Lunde, and was the terminal station until Kragerø Station opened in 1927.

| Preceding station | Express trains | Following station |
|---|---|---|
| Drangedal towards Stavanger | F5 | Bø towards Oslo S |
