= Peter Andreas Blix =

Norwegian architect and engineer

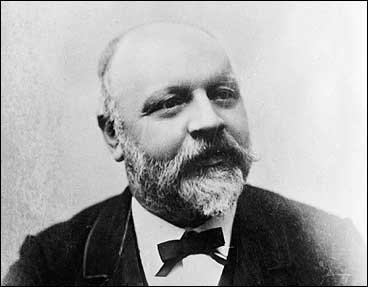
- Born: November 4, 1831; Frederiksvern, Norway
- Died: January 31, 1901 (aged 69); Norway
- Education: Leibniz University Hannover, University of Karlsruhe
- Occupations: Architect, engineer

Peter Andreas Blix (4 November 1831 – 31 January 1901) was a Norwegian architect and engineer best known for designing railway stations and villas in Swiss chalet style. He was also occupied with the conservation of Norwegian stave churches and the construction of canals in 19th century Norway.

== Early life and education ==
Peter Blix was born in the little town of Frederiksvern (now Stavern) south of Larvik in Vestfold. He was the eldest son of auditor John Gill Blix (1797–1874) and his wife Anna Dobberdine Randulff (1804–37). Blix's early childhood was marred by his mother's death when he was five years old. He eventually traveled to Kristiania (now Oslo), where he studied at the Christiania Burgher School (Christiania Borgerskole). The school system in Norway was under reform at the time Blix studied. The Latin was to be replaced with the mother tongue; the traditional memorizing method for students was to be replaced with new, sophisticated studying methods. At Oslo Cathedral School (Christiania Katedralskole) – where Blix later took his matric, one could note the contention between the classicists (pro-Latin) and the realists (pro-Norwegian).

In 1851, Blix traveled to Hannover, Germany to study at the faculty of Architecture and Landscape Sciences at the Leibniz University Hannover. He was not the only Norwegian student at the school; there were at least 53 other Norwegians there, amongst them Paul Due, Halvor Heyerdahl and Henrik Thrap-Meyer. A few years earlier, professor and architect Conrad Wilhelm Hase installed several reforms at the university, that Blix and other students took advantage of. Blix became very influenced by Hase's Neo-Gothic architectural style, which he would later use on railway stations and churches in Norway. Upon finishing his study in Hannover, Blix studied from 1854 to 1855 at the University of Karlsruhe.

== Career ==
When he returned from Germany, he was employed by Norwegian Water Resources and Energy Directorate (Kanalvæsenet), where he researched the possibility of a canal in Tyrifjorden. Blix also periodically maintained a private practice as an architect and designed several villas and hotels. His work for the railroad industry included construction of Østfold Line through Old Town of Oslo. Blix, who considered himself an engineer as well as an architect, also worked with Stadsingeniør in Bergen. In 1880 he became head of the restoration of the Bergen Cathedral and Håkonshallen. In 1895 Blix was commissioned to create restoration plans for Akershus Fortress.

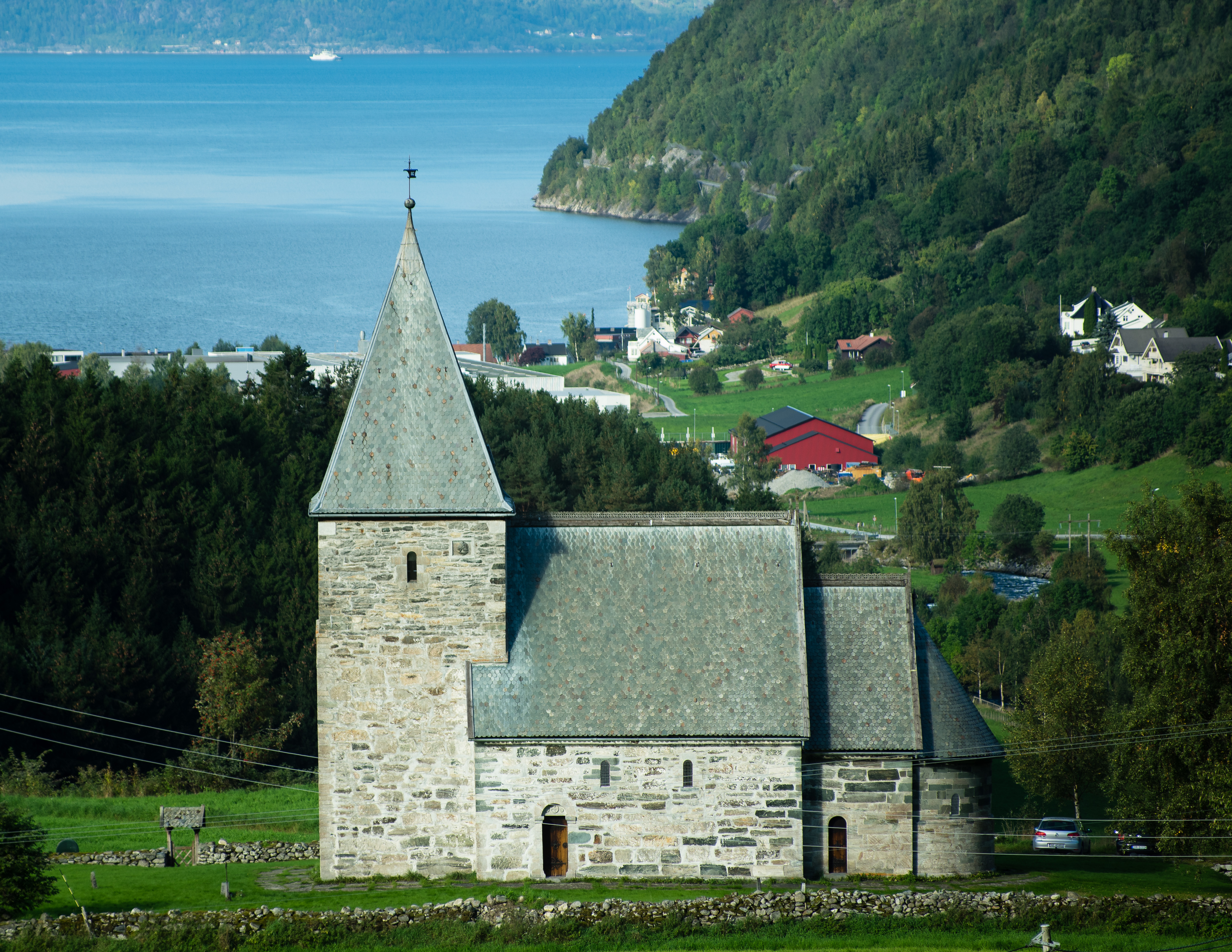
Hove Church at Vikøyri

Blix was also engaged in a number of organizations in Norway. He was a member of the Norwegian Polytechnic Society and founded the Norwegian Engineer and Architect Association (Tekna) in 1874. A controversial and headstrong personality, Blix came often in conflict with his colleagues, though Herman Major Schirmer's obituary of him called him a "warm and generous person".

Blix bought the historic Hove Church at Vikøyri in Vik in 1880 and restored the it between 1883 and 1888. Blix's goal was to rebuild the stone church to its original conditions. Blix removed all the fixtures that were not from the Middle Ages. On the exterior Blix built up a large stone tower on the base of the old tower. He owned the church until his death, and bequeathed it to his brother who then gave it to the state. When Blix died in 1901 he was buried under the floor of the church.

== Legacy ==
The railway tunnel of the Follo Line running parallel to the Østfold Line is named the Blix Tunnel, which was named after him.

== Gallery ==
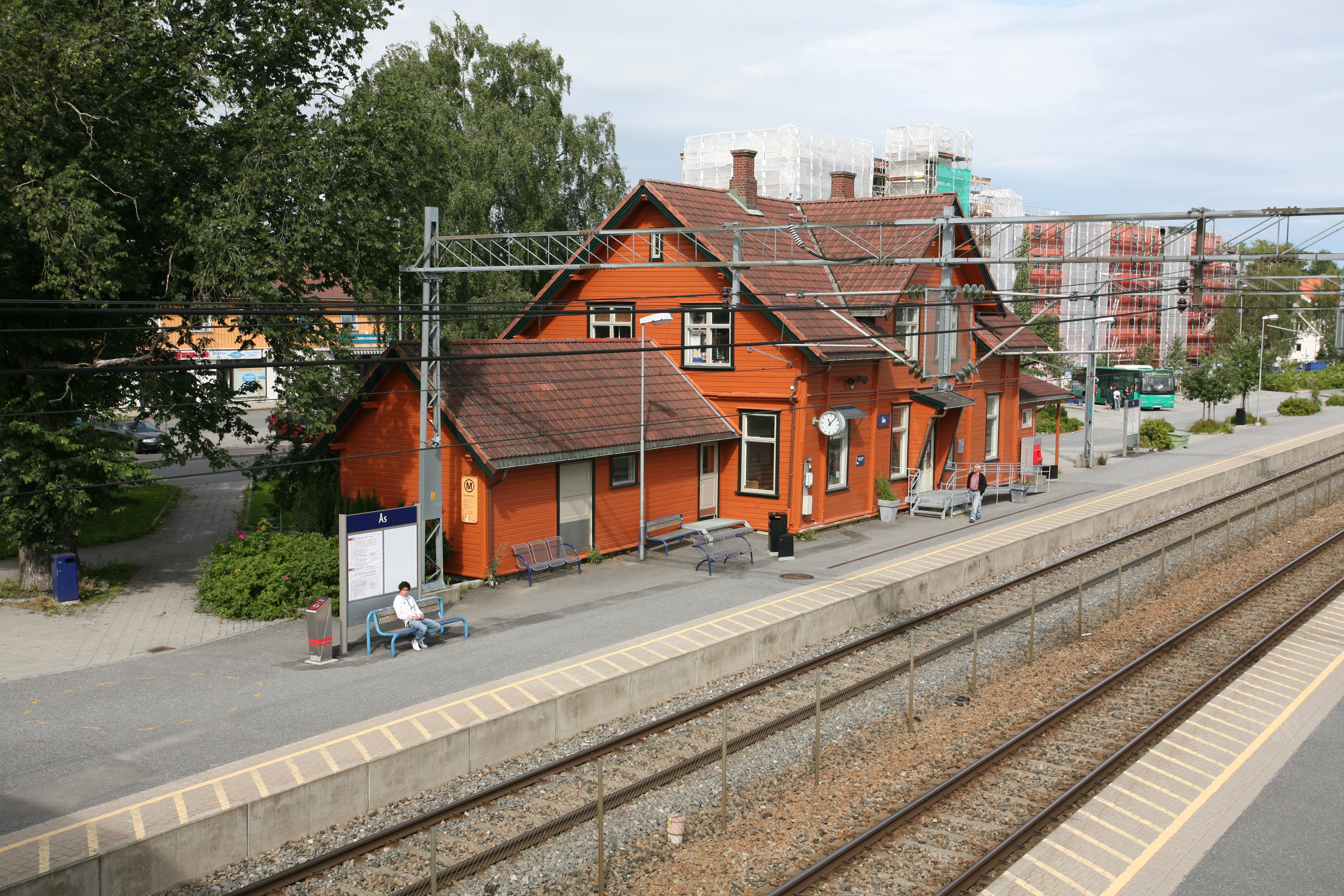
Ås Rail Station

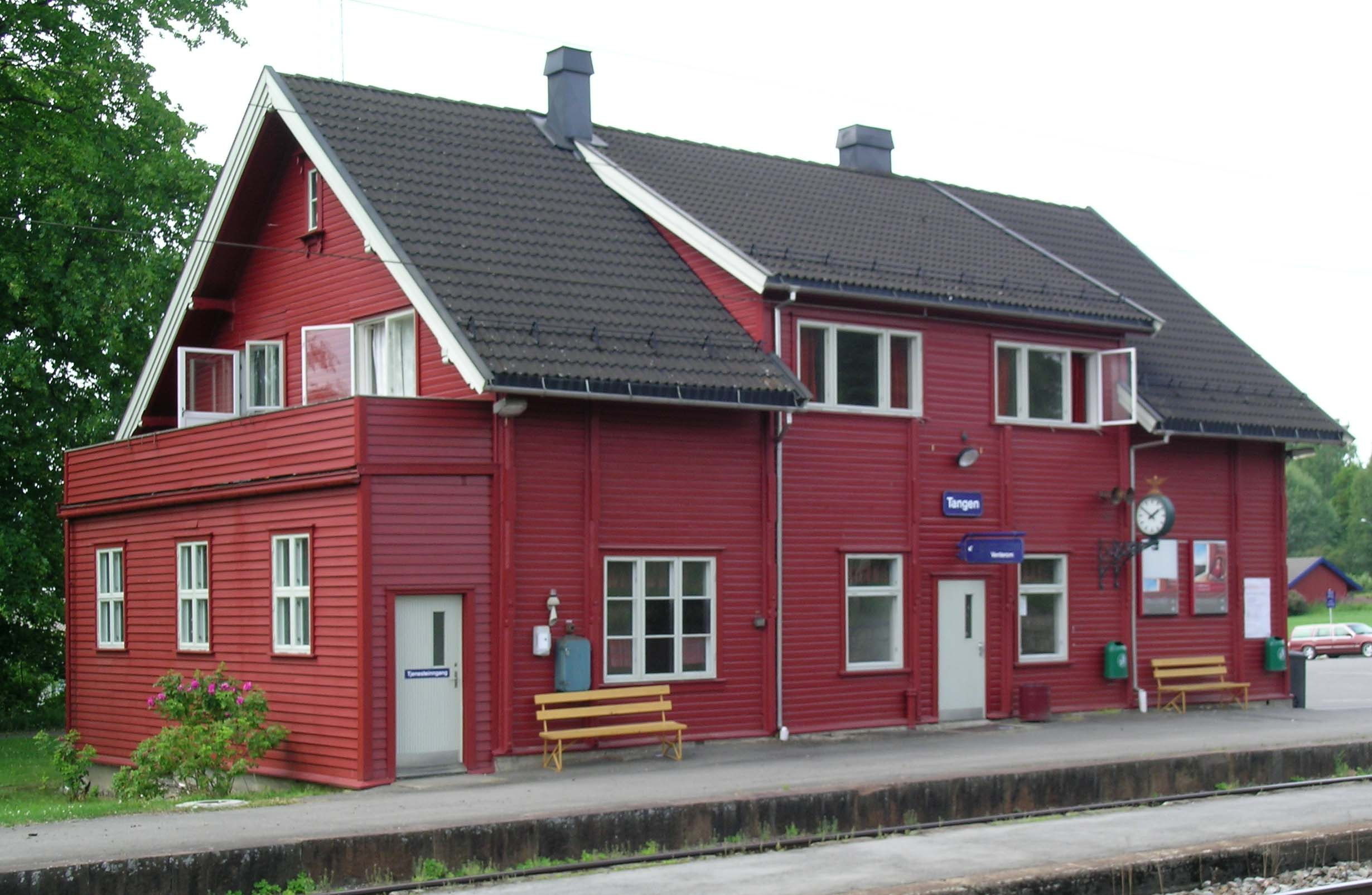
Tangen Rail Station

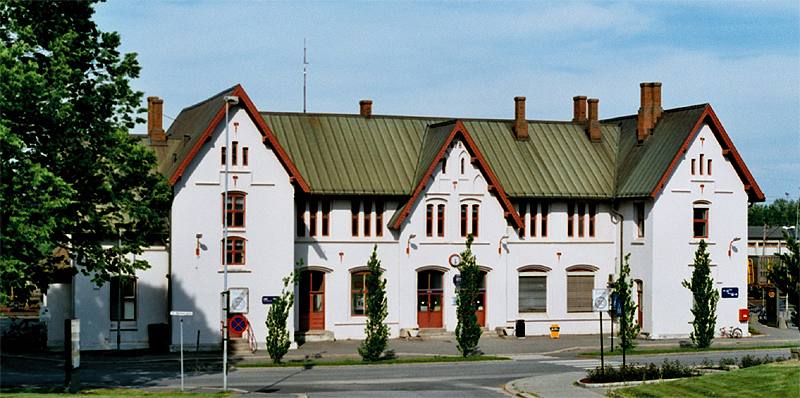
Sarpsborg Rail Station

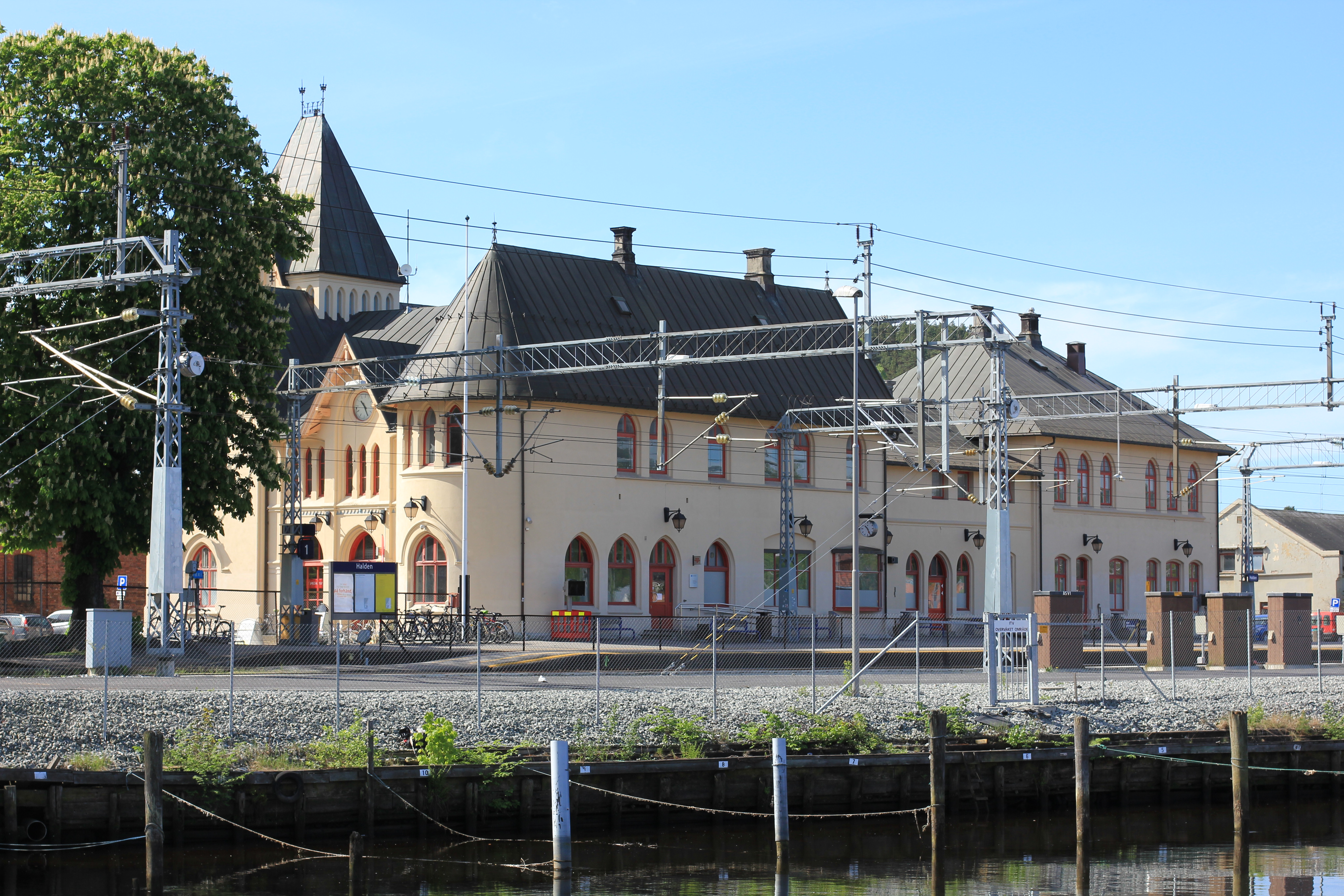
Halden Rail Station

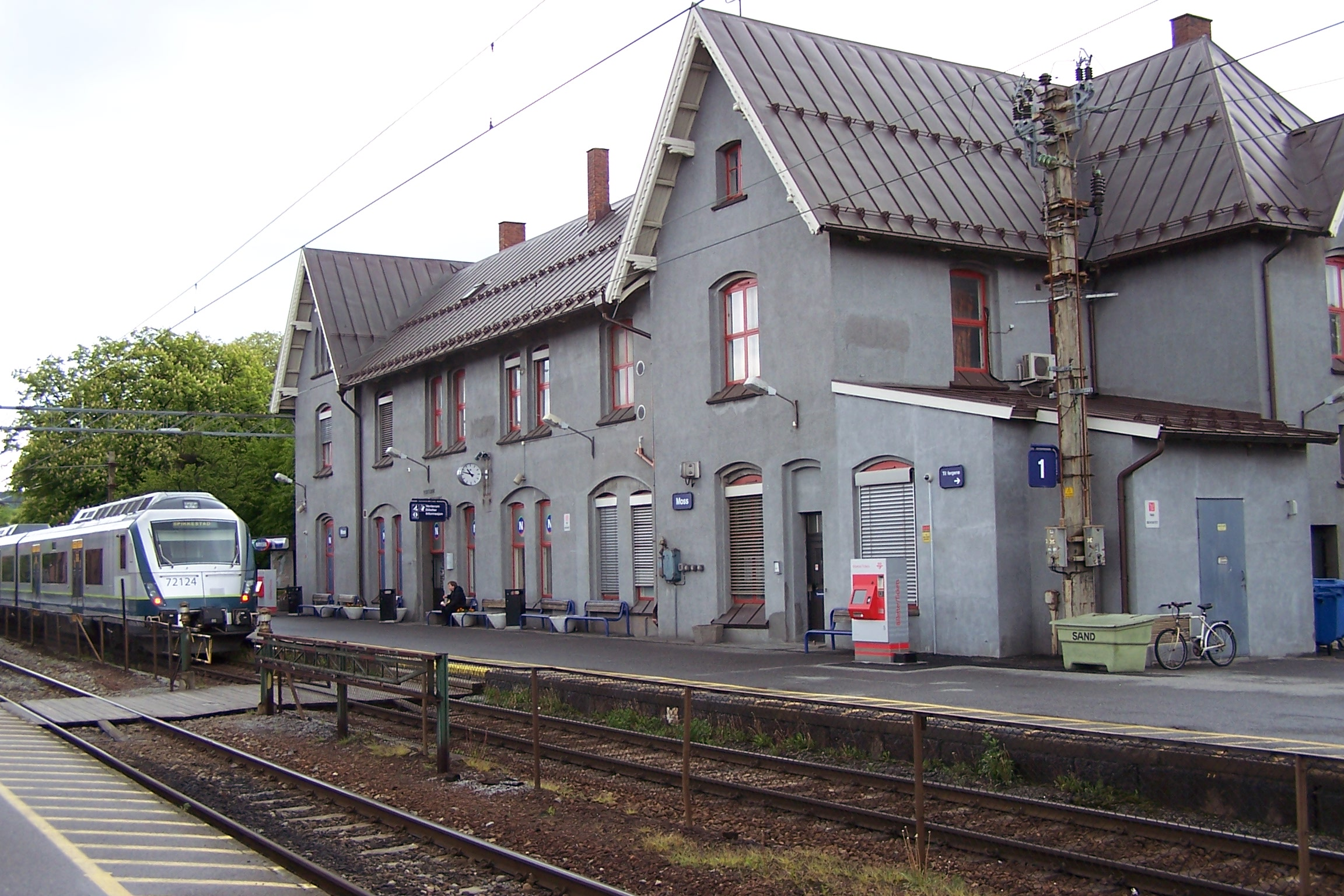
Moss Rail Station

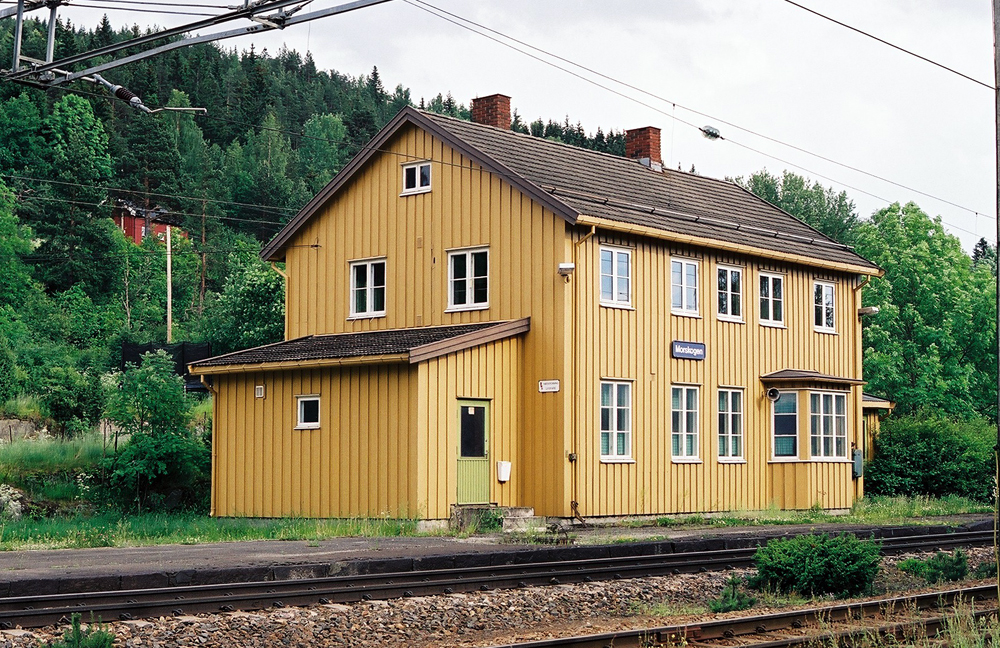
Morskogen Rail Station

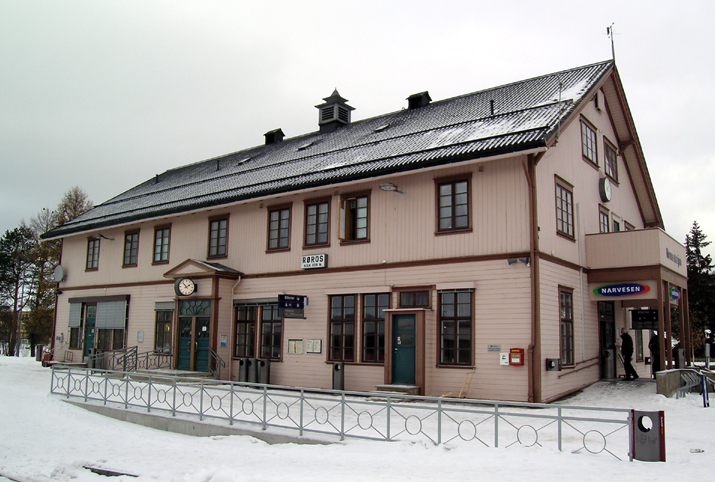
Røros Rail Station

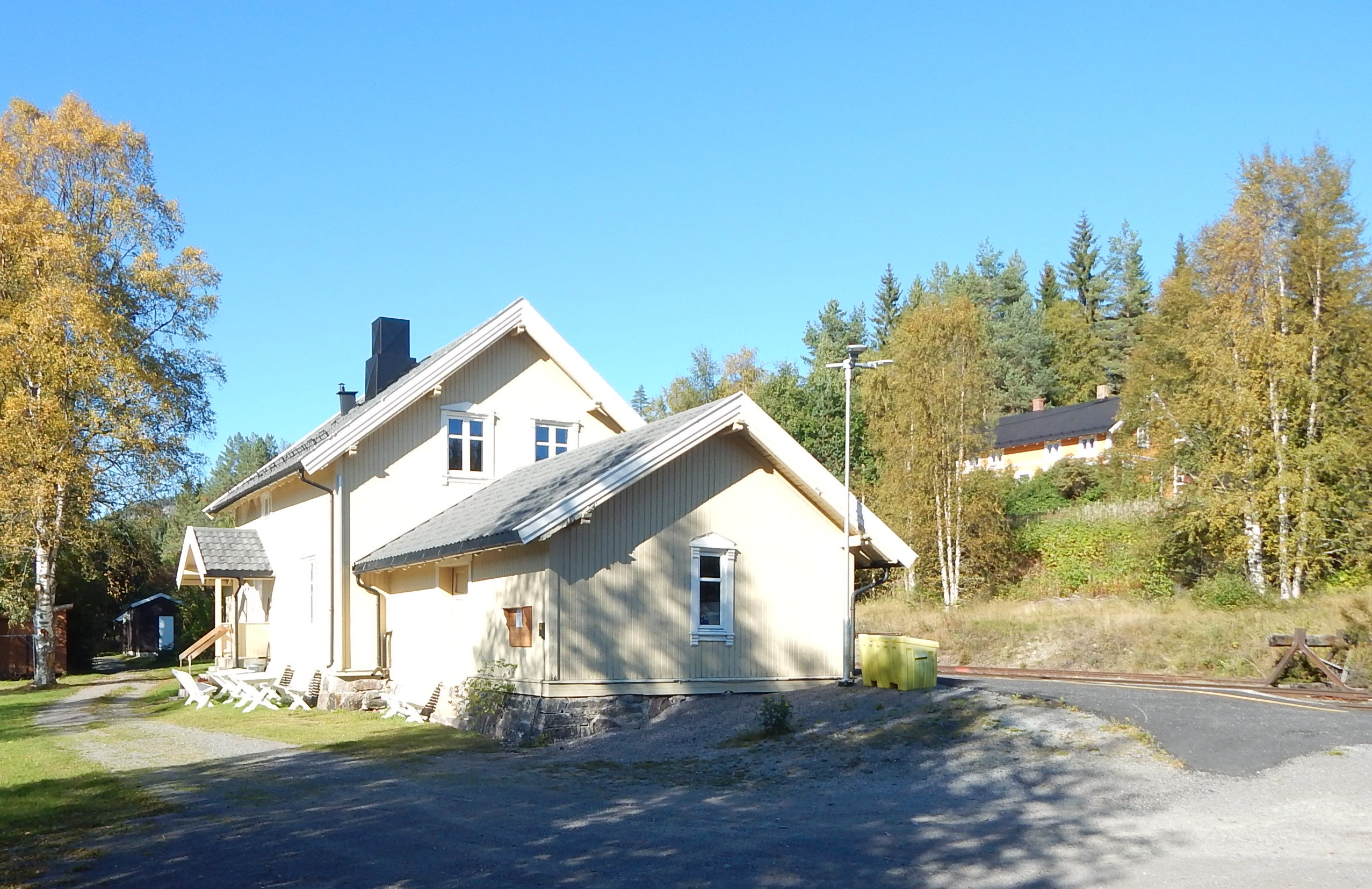
Opphus Rail Station

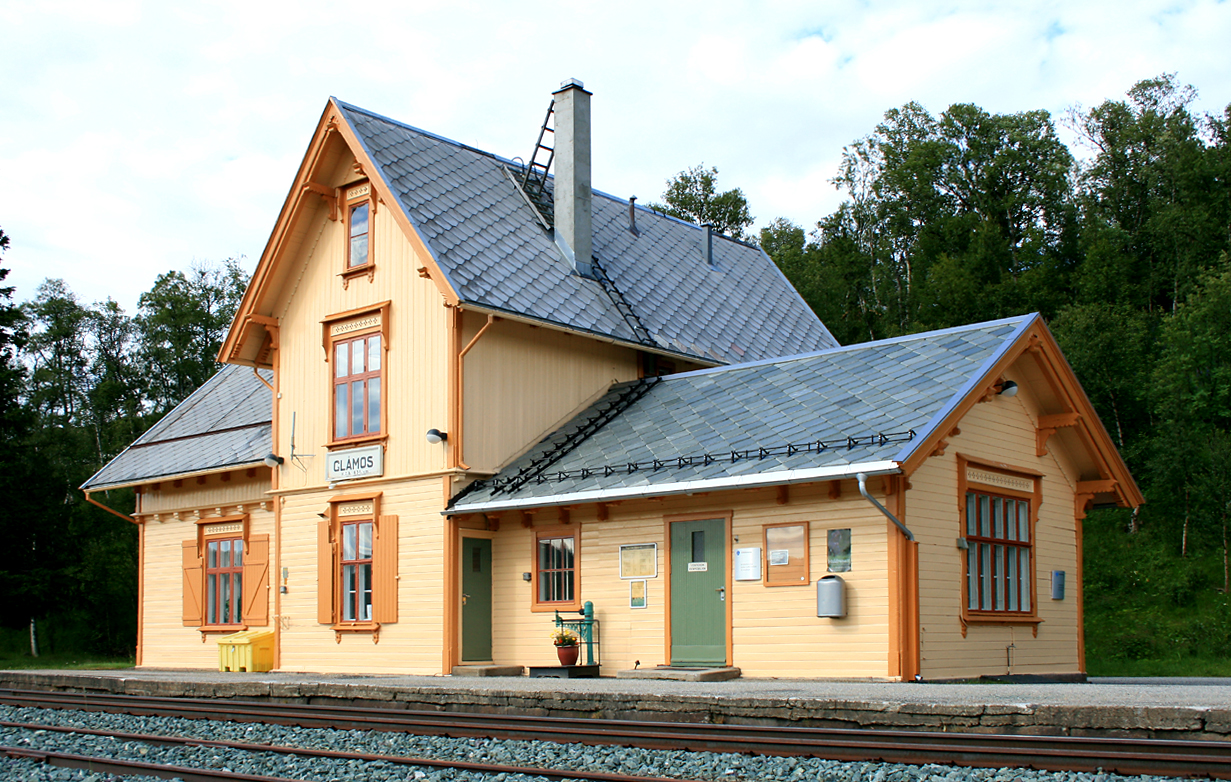
Glåmos Rail Station

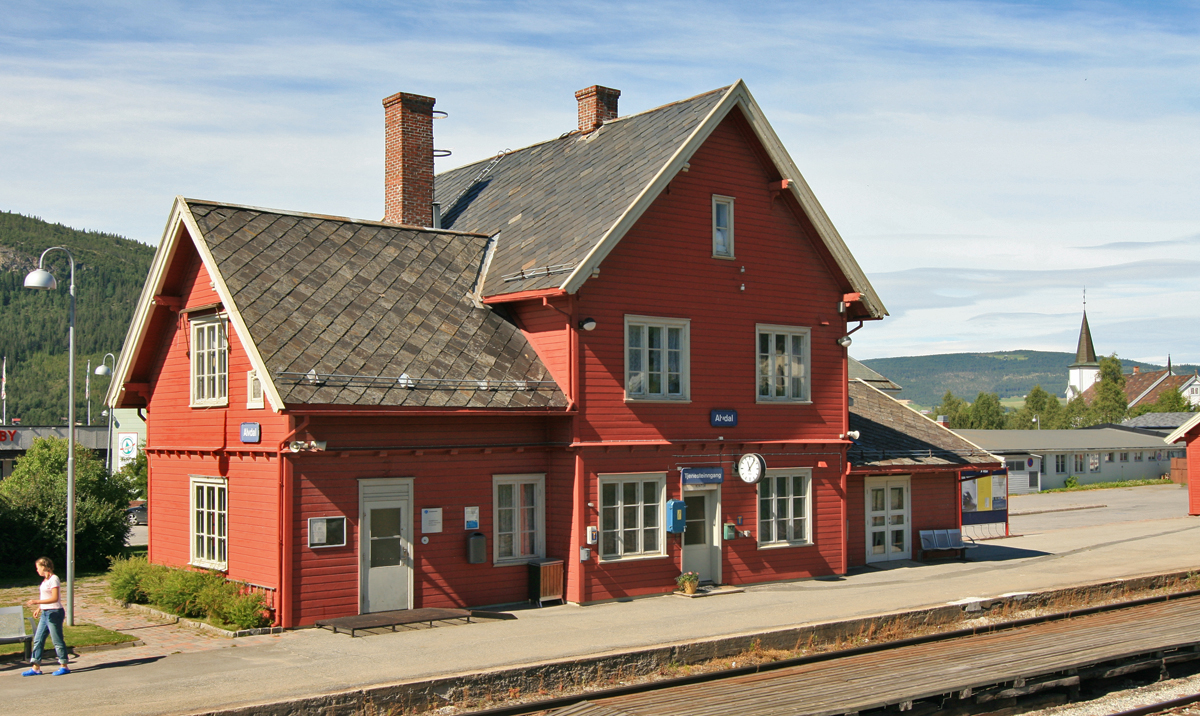
Alvdal Rail Station
