= Kambo Station =

Railway station in Moss, Norway

Kambo
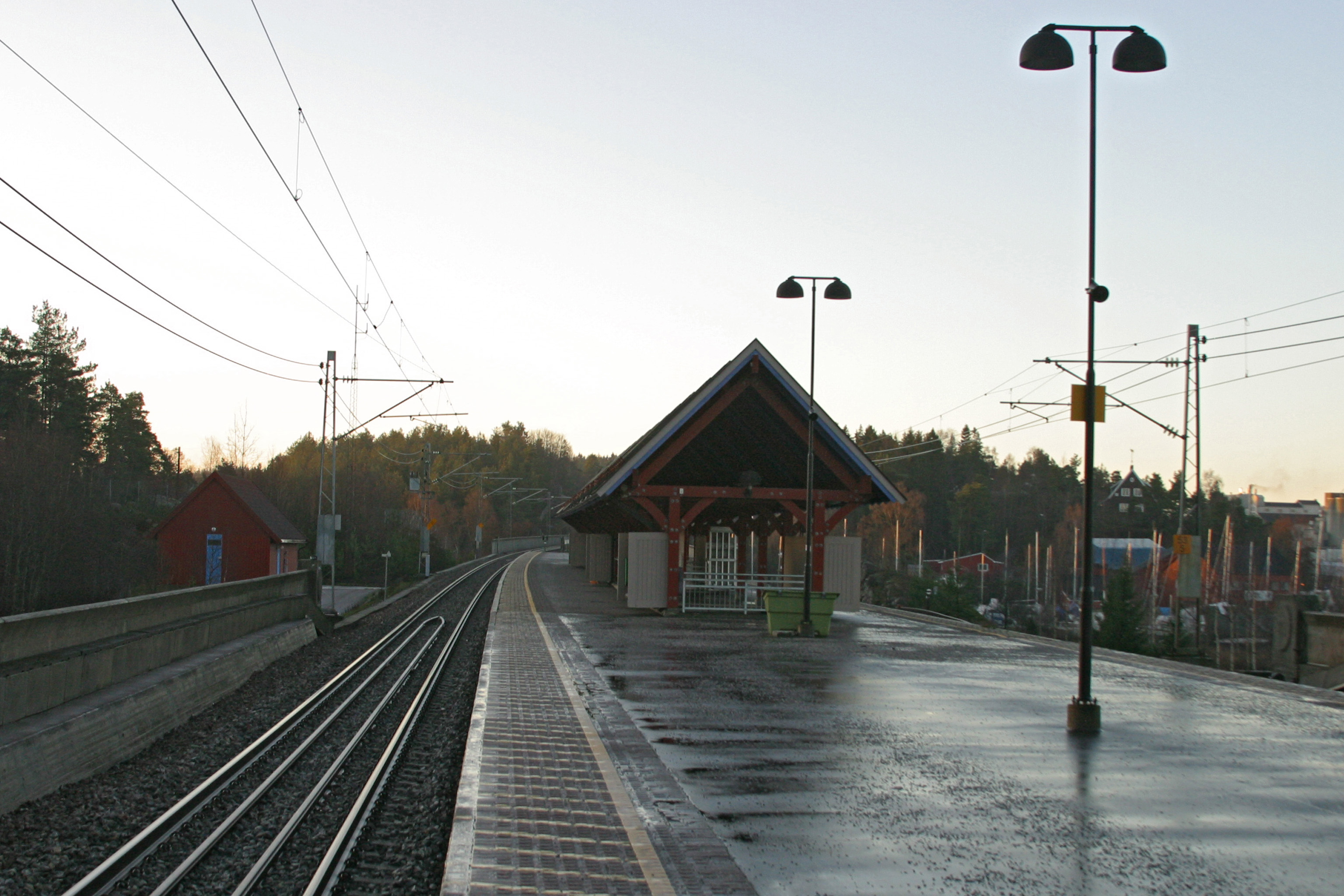

General information
- Location: Kambo, Moss; Norway
- Coordinates: 59°28′39″N 10°41′32″E
- Owner: Bane NOR
- Operator: Vy
- Line: Østfold Line
- Distance: 53,58 km
- Platforms: 2

Other information
- Station code: KAM

History
- Opened: 1996
Location

Kambo Station (Norwegian: Kambo stasjon) is located at the village of Kambo in Moss, Norway on the Østfold Line. The station is served by commuter trains L21 between Stabekk via Oslo to Moss with half hour or hourly headway by Vy.

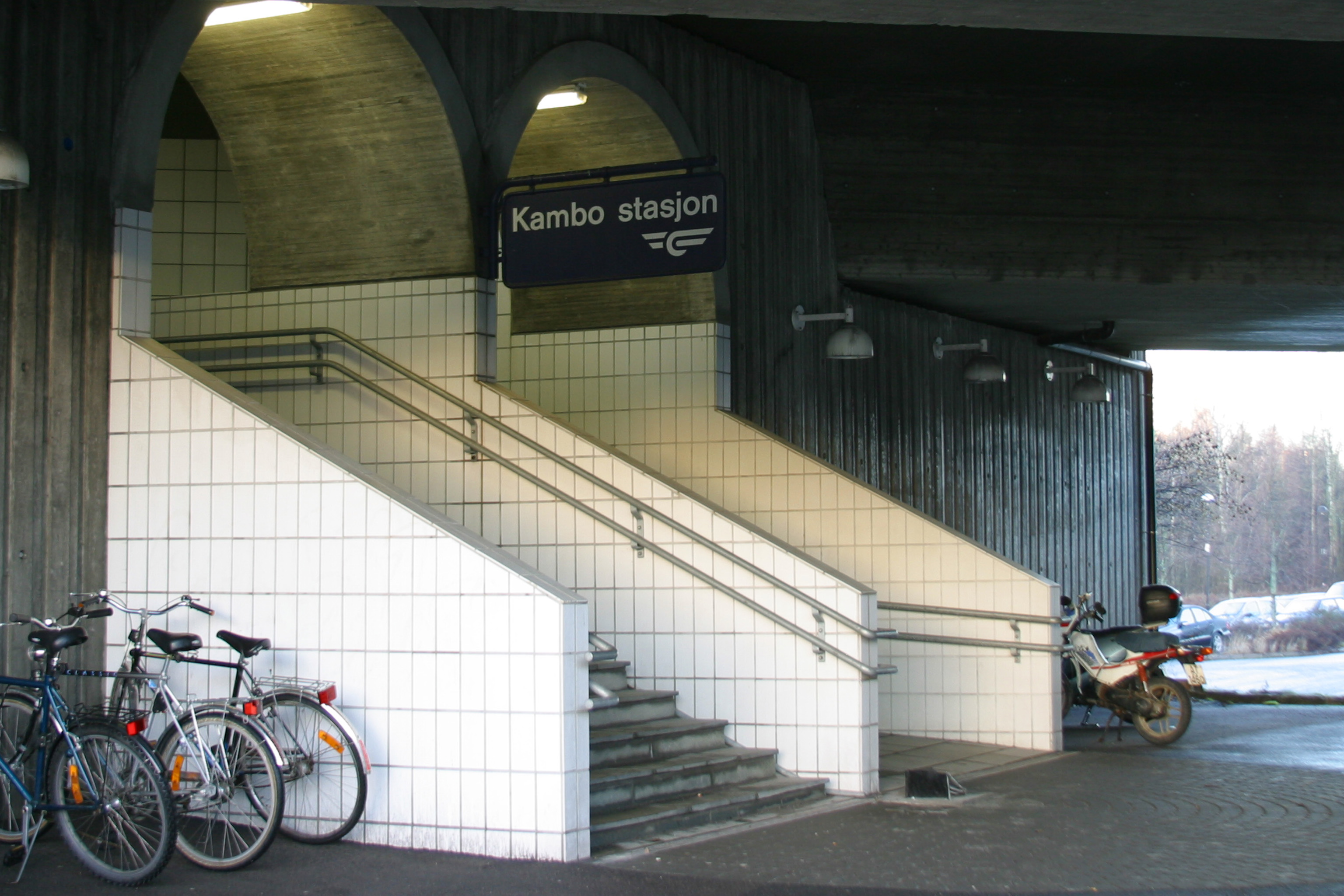
Entrance stairways

== History ==
The station was opened in 1996 when the line between Ski and Moss was rebuilt to double track. There was also a Kambo station on the old track.

Preceding station			Following station
Sonsveien	Østfold Line		Moss
Preceding station	Local trains		Following station
Sonsveien	R21	Oslo S–Moss	Moss
