= Moss Station =

Railway station in Moss, Norway

Moss
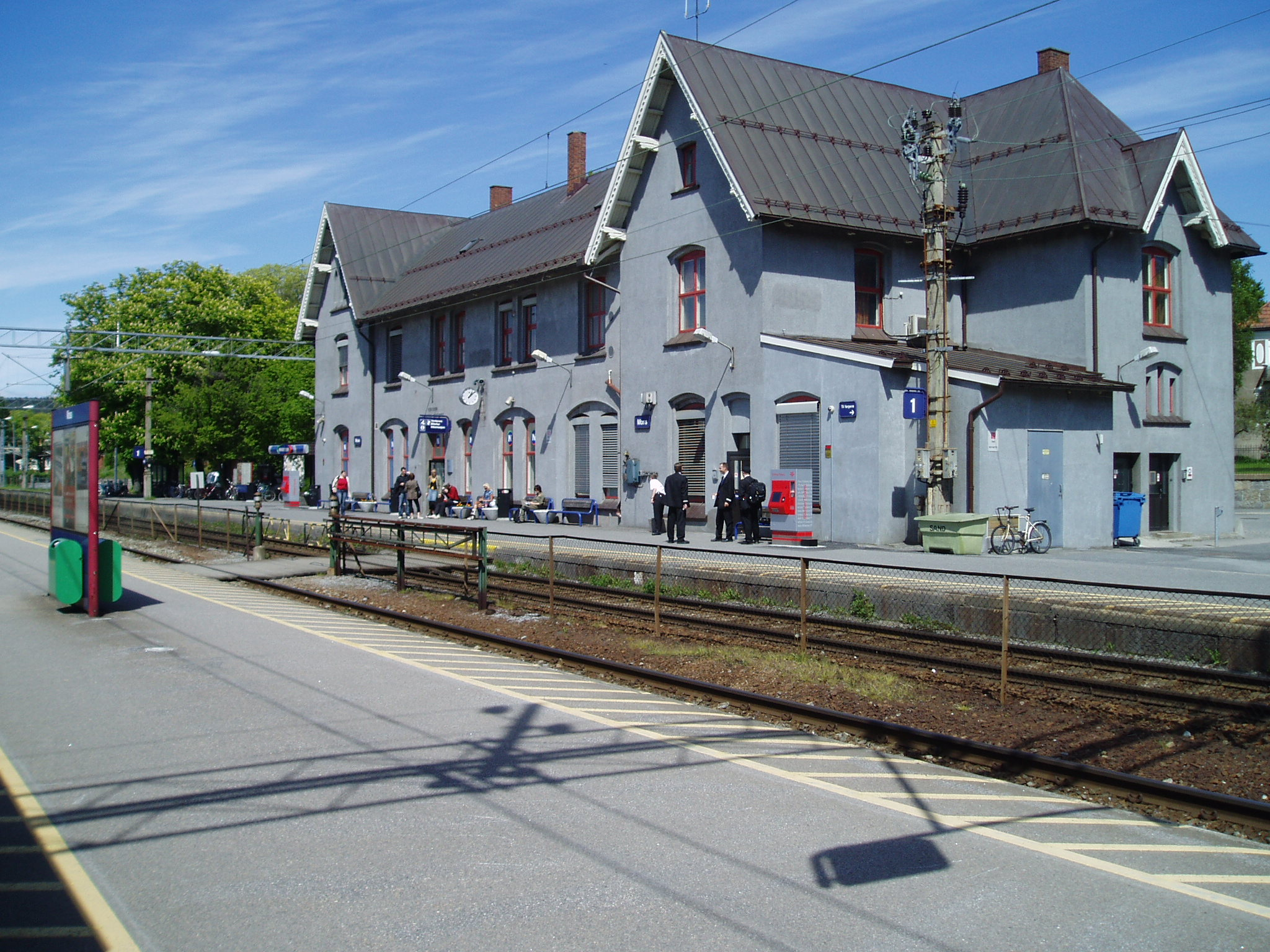
- Moss Station

General information
- Location: Moss in Østfold, Norway
- Coordinates: 59°25′55″N 10°39′26″E
- Elevation: 3.8 m (12 ft) amsl
- Owner: Bane NOR
- Operator: Vy
- Line: Østfold Line
- Distance: 60.16 km (37.38 mi)
- Connections: Bus: Østfold Kollektivtrafikk; Ferry: Moss–Horten Ferry

Construction
- Architect: Peter Andreas Blix

Other information
- Station code: MOS

History
- Opened: 2 January 1879
Track layout
Location

Moss Station (Norwegian: Moss stasjon) is a railway station located in downtown Moss in Østfold, Norway. The station is located on the Østfold Line and serves as terminal station for Line R21 of the Oslo Commuter Rail service to Oslo Central Station and onwards to Stabekk as well as a stop of the RE20 regional services between Oslo and Halden with some trains continuing to Gothenburg. All services are operated by Vy.

== History ==
Moss Station was built based upon designs by architect, Peter Andreas Blix. The station was opened as part of the railway on 2 January 1879. In 1923, an agreement was made by which the restaurant was to be taken over by Norsk Spisevognselskap (NSS) in 1924. However, private operation continued until 1 October 1941, when operations were taken over by Spisevognselskapet.

== New station ==
A new station is being built 300 meters south of the current station, connected to the construction of a high-speed line. Construction started 2019 and was planned to be in operation 2025. The construction of the station and surrounding route is severely delayed due to problems with unstable ground.

Preceding station	Regional trains		Following station
Ski towards Oslo S		RE20	Rygge towards Halden or Göteborg C
Preceding station	Local trains		Following station
Kambo	R21	Oslo S–Moss	Terminus
