= Fossli Hotel =

Hotel in Vestland, Norway

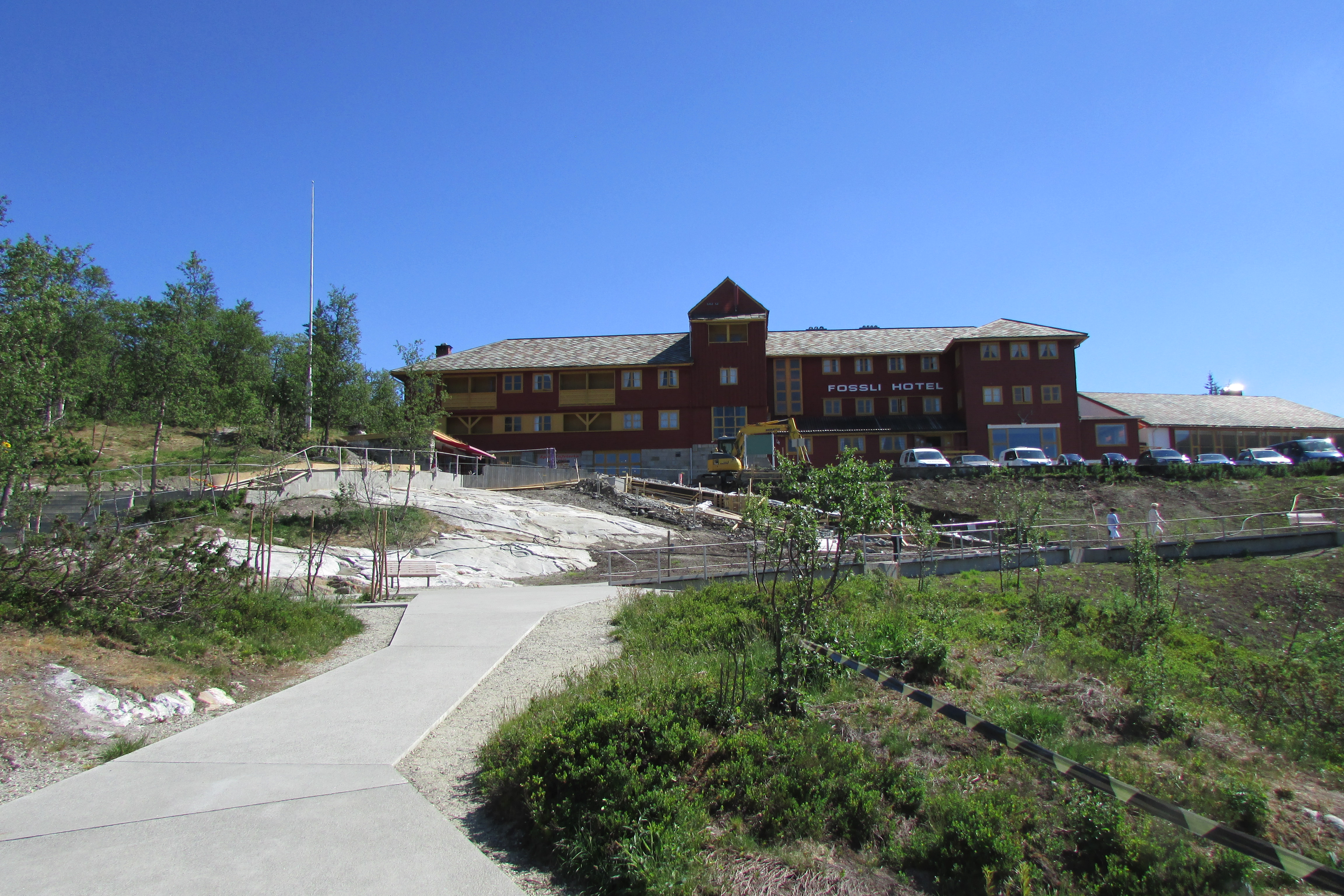
- Fossli Hotel
- Interactive map of the Fossli Hotel area

General information
- Location: Vøringsfossen, Eidfjord Municipality, Vestland, Norway
- Coordinates: 60°25′39″N 7°15′17″E
- Opening: 1891
- Owner: Erik Garen

Other information
- Number of rooms: 21
- Number of restaurants: 1

Website
- Fossli Hotel

Fossli Hotel is a hotel in Eidfjord Municipality in Vestland county, Norway. The hotel is situated on top of a mountain, just off Norwegian National Road 7, about 10 kilometres (6 mi) east of the village of Øvre Eidfjord. The hotel overlooks the Måbødalen valley and the Vøringsfossen waterfall.

The hotel owns a Zimmermann piano where Edvard Grieg composed his Norwegian Folk Songs, Opus 66, in 1896. The hotel welcomed its first guests in 1887 and was finally completed in 1891.

== History ==
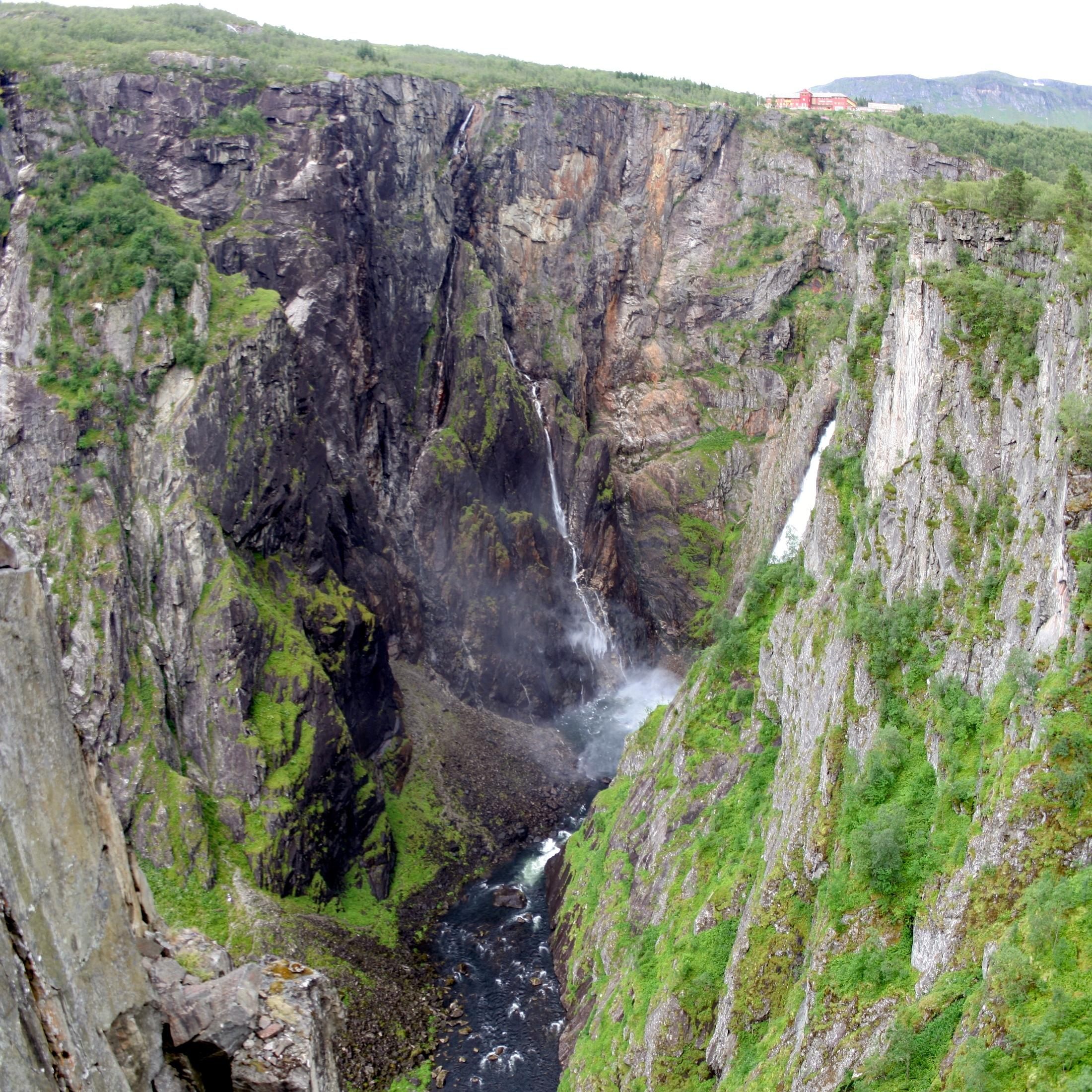
Fossli Hotel on top of Måbødalen

Ola L. Garen (1857–1915) got the idea to build the hotel in the 1880s. At that time there was only a walking track to the top of Vøringsfossen. English tourists had previously suggested that a hotel would become a world attraction. However to make these plans come true, Garen had to have a better way to transport the building materials so that the horses might climb up the Måbødalen. A new road was built and named Tømmerløypet. Fossli Hotel was designed by architect Fredrik Konow Lund (1889-1970) in Art Nouveau style.

== Attractions ==
Fossli Hotel naturally attracts many visitors because of the magnificent Vøringsfossen. Over the years, it has been visited by writers, musicians, and royal physician. Edvard Grieg lived in the hotel in the summer of 1896, and composed Norwegian Folk Songs, Opus 66, here. There is still a piano on site made in 1896 by Zimmermann factory in Leipzig, as Edvard Grieg once played on it. The hotel has been in the ownership of the Garen family for four generations, and currently is run by Erik Garen, the great-grandson of founder Ola Garen.

== See also ==
- Lyric Pieces
