= Måbø Bridge =

Måbø Bridge Måbø bru
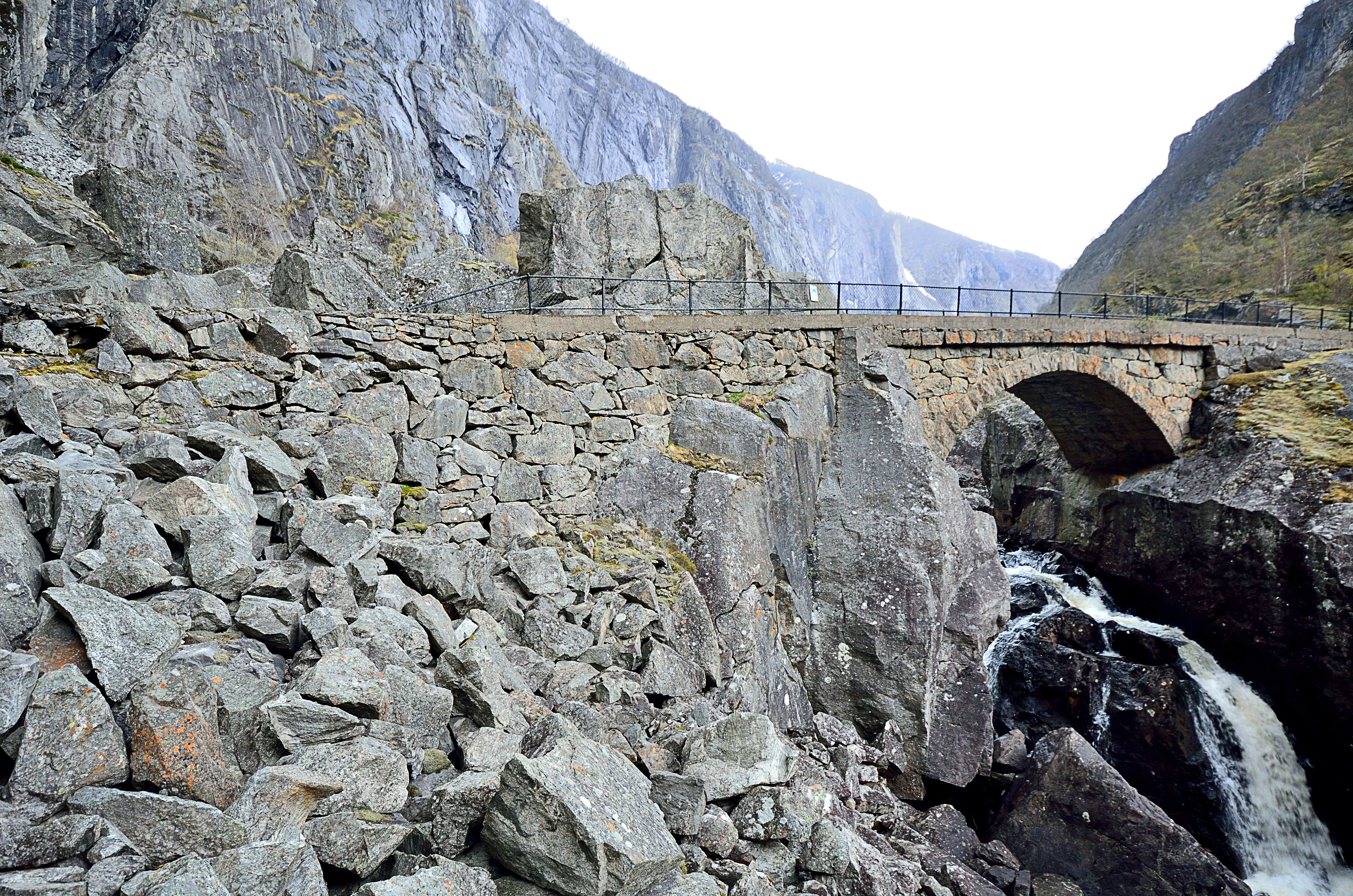
- One of the bridge's two stone arches
- Coordinates: 60.422893°N 7.204548°E
- Carries: Norwegian National Road 7 (old route)
- Crosses: Bjoreio River
- Locale: Eidfjord Municipality
- Owner: Statens vegvesen

Characteristics
- Design: Arch bridge
- Material: Stone
- Total length: 17.2 meters (56 ft)
- Width: 3.35 meters (11.0 ft)
- Longest span: 9.3 meters (31 ft)
- No. of spans: 2

History
- Construction end: 1910

Location
- Interactive map of Måbø Bridge

The Måbø Bridge (Norwegian: Måbø bru) is a stone arch bridge over the Bjoreio River in the Måbø Valley just below Lake Måbø (Måbøvatnet) in Eidfjord Municipality in Vestland, Norway.

The bridge was built in 1910 and has two spans, measuring 9.3 meters (31 ft) and 7.9 meters (26 ft), and it is 3.35 meters (11.0 ft) wide. The bridge has protected status as cultural heritage. The bridge was built as part of the first road into the Måbø Valley, constructed from 1900 to 1916. Today's Norwegian National Road 7 passes nearby, looping out of the Kvernhushaug Tunnel (below) and into the Måbø Tunnel (above). The bridge was taken out of service when the new route for National Road 7 was completed. The previous bridges in the Måbø Valley, predating the road built in 1900, were probably wooden beam bridges.
