= Eidfjord (village) =

Village in Eidfjord Municipality, Norway

- Village
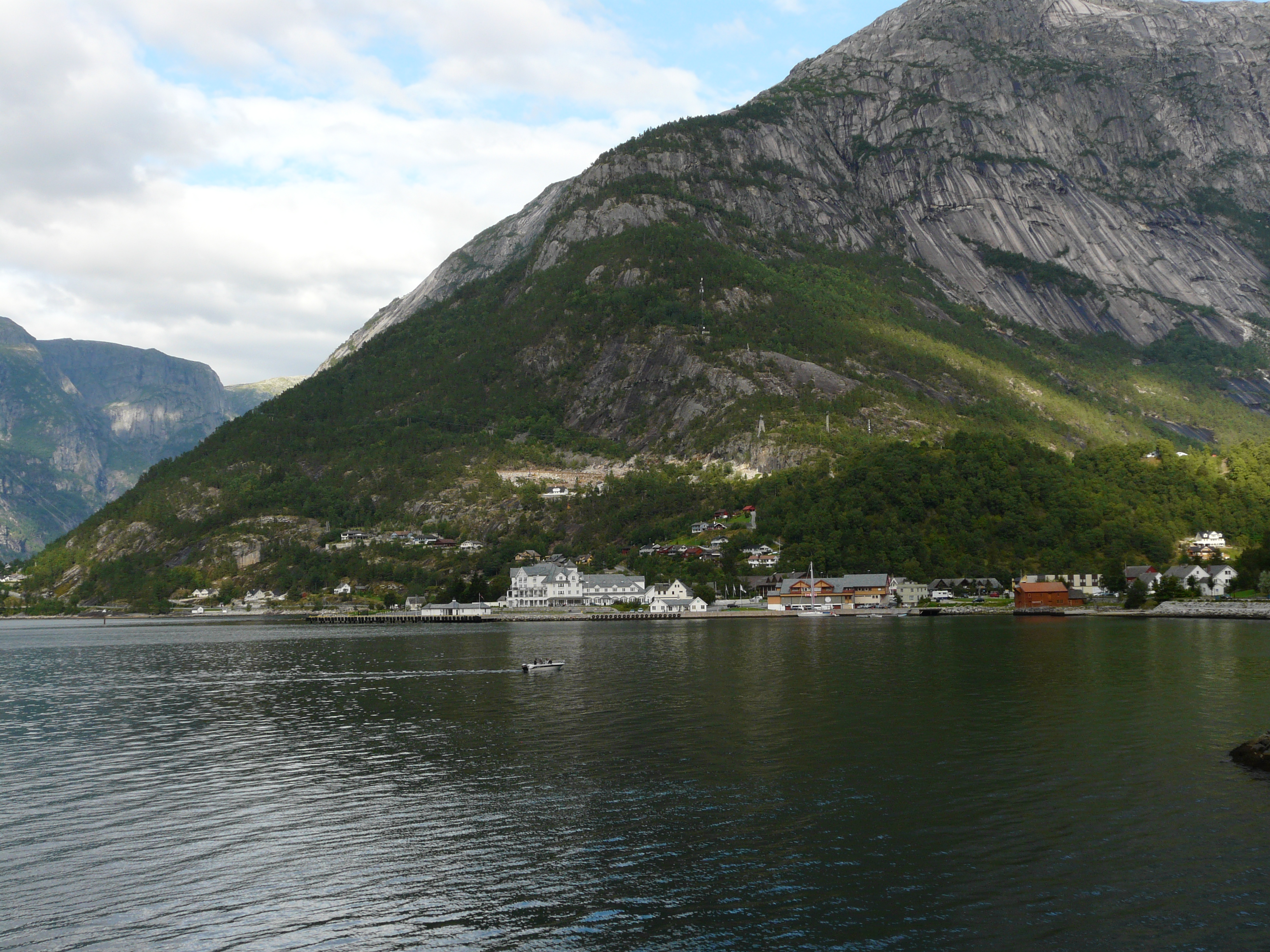
- View of the village
- Interactive map of Eidfjord
- Coordinates: 60.4675°N 7.07193°E
- Country: Norway
- Region: Western Norway
- County: Vestland
- District: Hardanger
- Municipality: Eidfjord Municipality

Area
  - Total: 0.75 km^{2} (0.29 sq mi)
- Elevation: 1 m (3.3 ft)

Population (2025)
  - Total: 571
  - Density: 761/km^{2} (1,970/sq mi)
- Time zone: UTC+01:00 (CET)
  - Summer (DST): UTC+02:00 (CEST)
- Post Code: 5783 Eidfjord

Eidfjord is the administrative centre of Eidfjord Municipality in Vestland county, Norway. The village is located on the shore of the Eidfjorden, an inner branch of the large Hardangerfjorden. The village sits about 15 kilometres (9.3 mi) east of the Hardanger Bridge along the Norwegian National Road 7.

The 0.75-square-kilometre (190-acre) village has a population (2025) of 571 and a population density of 761 inhabitants per square kilometre (1,970/sq mi). This makes it the largest settlement in the municipality, with over half of Eidfjord's residents living in this village.

== Economy ==
The village is the main commercial and government centre for the whole municipality. The village is a tourist destination with a quay for summertime cruise ships that sail along the fjord. The Hardangervidda plateau and the Hardangerjøkulen glacier are both located nearby. The Måbødalen valley and the famous Vøringfossen waterfall are a short distance away. This is why Eidfjord is home to many hotels, guest houses, and camp sites, as well as souvenir shops. The only school in the municipality, Lægreid School, is located here too.

== Geography ==
Eidfjord is located between the Eidfjorden (on the north side of the village) and the large lake Eidfjordvatnet (on the south side of the village). The short river Eio runs between the lake and the village. The village of Øvre Eidfjord lies about 6 kilometres (3.7 mi) south of Eidfjord, on the south side of the lake Eidfjordvatnet.

== History ==
The village has been inhabited for a long time. There are Viking Age burial mounds located just up the hill from the village on a small plateau. The Old Eidfjord Church was built in Eidfjord in 1309. It was in continuous use until 1981 when the new Eidfjord Church was built just northwest of the old church.
