= Hardangervidda Natursenter =

Museum and visitor center at Hardangervidda National Park in Norway

Coordinates: 60.423261°N 7.134517°E

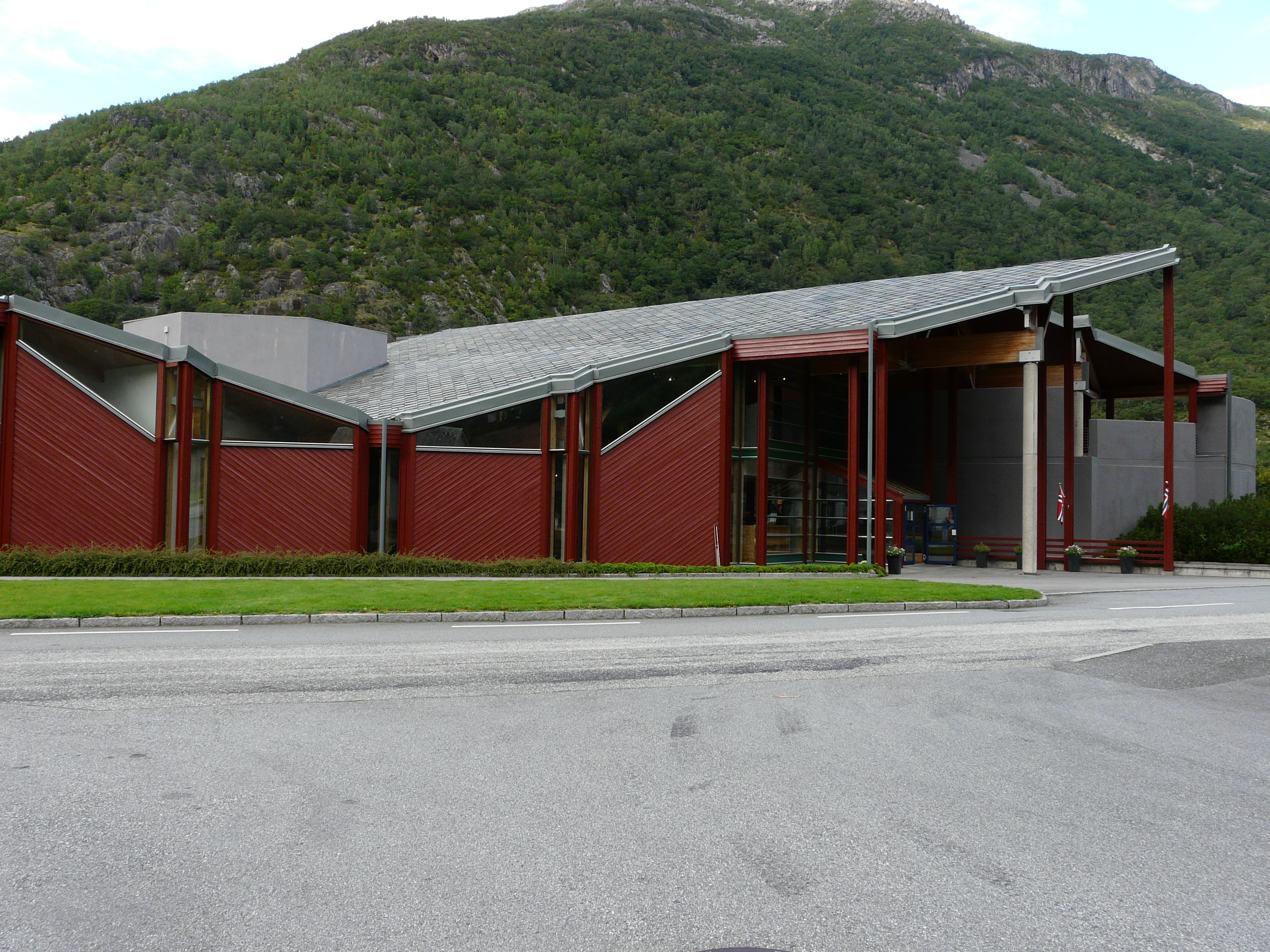
Hardangervidda Nature Center in Eidfjord

The Hardangervidda Natursenter (lit. 'Hardanger Plateau Nature Centre') is a museum and visitor center at Hardangervidda National Park in Vestland county, Norway. The nature centre is located in the village of Øvre Eidfjord in Eidfjord Municipality. It is accessible off Norwegian National Road 7. It is situated near the Vøringsfossen waterfall and the Måbødalen valley, two major tourist sites in the region.

The nature center was opened on 28 May 1995. It was authorized as a national park center for the Hardangervidda National Park in 1997. Exhibitions in the center are spread over three floors of the facility. The centre underwent major creative overhaul in 2018 with exhibitions developed by Sarner International Ltd in London.
