= Bjoreio =

River in Vestland, Norway

Bjoreio Bjoreia (unofficial)
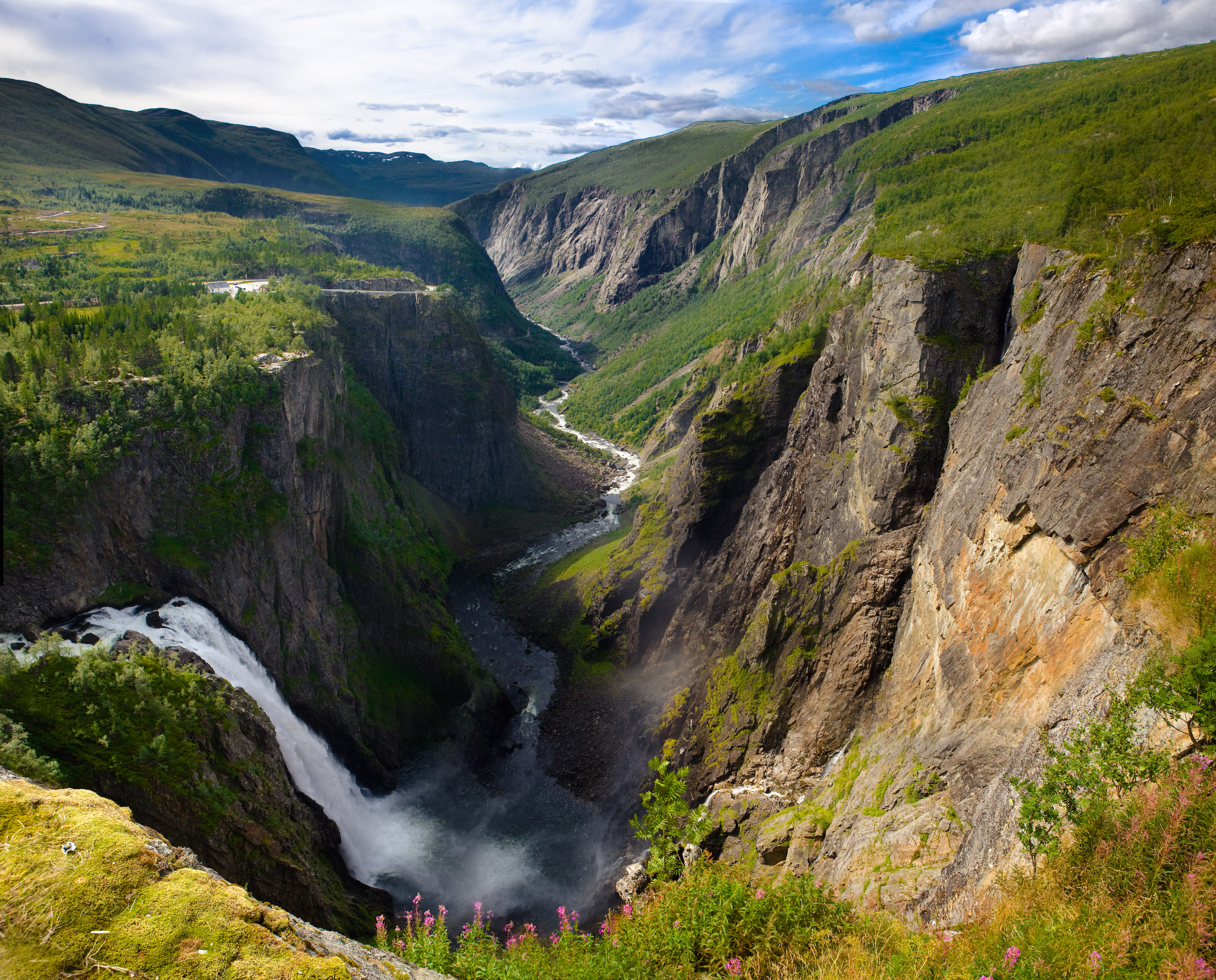
- Vøring Falls on the Bjoreio River

Location
- Country: Norway
- County: Vestland
- Municipalities: Eidfjord Municipality

Physical characteristics
- Source: Tinnhølen
  - location: Eidfjord Municipality, Norway
  - coordinates: 60.2865568°N 7.5624561°E
  - elevation: 1,213 m (3,980 ft)
- Mouth: Lake Eidfjord
  - location: Eidfjord Municipality, Norway
  - coordinates: 60.427569°N 7.1223271°E
  - elevation: 17.5 m (57 ft)
- Length: 72 km (45 mi)
- Basin size: 627 km^{2} (242 sq mi)

The Bjoreio is a river in Eidfjord Municipality in Vestland, Norway. The river is 72 kilometers (45 mi) long, and it has a drainage basin of 627 square kilometers (242 sq mi). Its natural average discharge is 25.2 cubic meters per second (890 cu ft/s), but this is considerably less today because of hydroelectric infrastructure along the watercourse.

The Bjoreio has its origin on the northwest side of Sildabunutane, a 1,444-meter (4,738 ft) mountain in Hardangervidda National Park. The river, which is called the Eitro here, then runs southeast through Sildabudalen, a wide valley, and into Langavatnet, a lake at an elevation of 1,223 meters (4,012 ft). Under the name Snero the river continues the short distance to Tinnhølen, a lake at 1,213 meters (3,980 ft). When it flows out of Tinnhølen the river is now named Bjoreio, and it runs to the northwest out of the national park and down through the Bjorei Valley (Bjoreidalen). At the Nybu tourist lodge it is joined by the Svinto from the east. Here the river runs through the Bjorei Valley Nature Reserve (Bjoreidalen naturreservat). In the nature reserve there is a ban on walking outside specially marked trails from May 20 to July 20 to protect nesting birds. Further downstream, at Storlia, is the 81-meter (266 ft) high Sysen Dam, a large stone embankment that creates Lake Sysen on the Leiro River just before it empties into the Bjoreio. The rivers continues westward through the Sysen Valley, where its tributaries include the Isdølo from the north and the Drolstølbekken from the south. At Fossli the river creates 182-meter (597 ft) high Vøring Falls, where it hurtles down into the narrow and deep Måbø Valley. The river empties into Lake Eidfjord in Øvre Eidfjord, only 500 meters (1,600 ft) from the nearby Veig River. At the opposite end of Lake Eidfjord, the short Eio River empties into the Hardanger Fjord.

Together with the nearby Sima River to the north, the Bjoreio River has been developed for power production at the Sima Hydroelectric Power Station. Lake Sysen is used as the main reservoir. The river's flow has been diverted through a tunnel to the lake and, together with the upper course of the Isdølo, the water is then directed to the power station below Kjeåsen on the north side of the Simadal Fjord. The river bed below the Sysen Dam is dry for most of the year, but during the summer season it is required to release water so that the flow at Vøring Falls is at least 12 cubic meters per second (420 cu ft/s).

At the lower end of Lake Måbø (Måbøvatnet), the old road through the valley crosses the river over the Måbø Bridge.

== See also ==
- List of rivers in Norway
