= Wedding Day at Troldhaugen =

Composition by Edvard Grieg

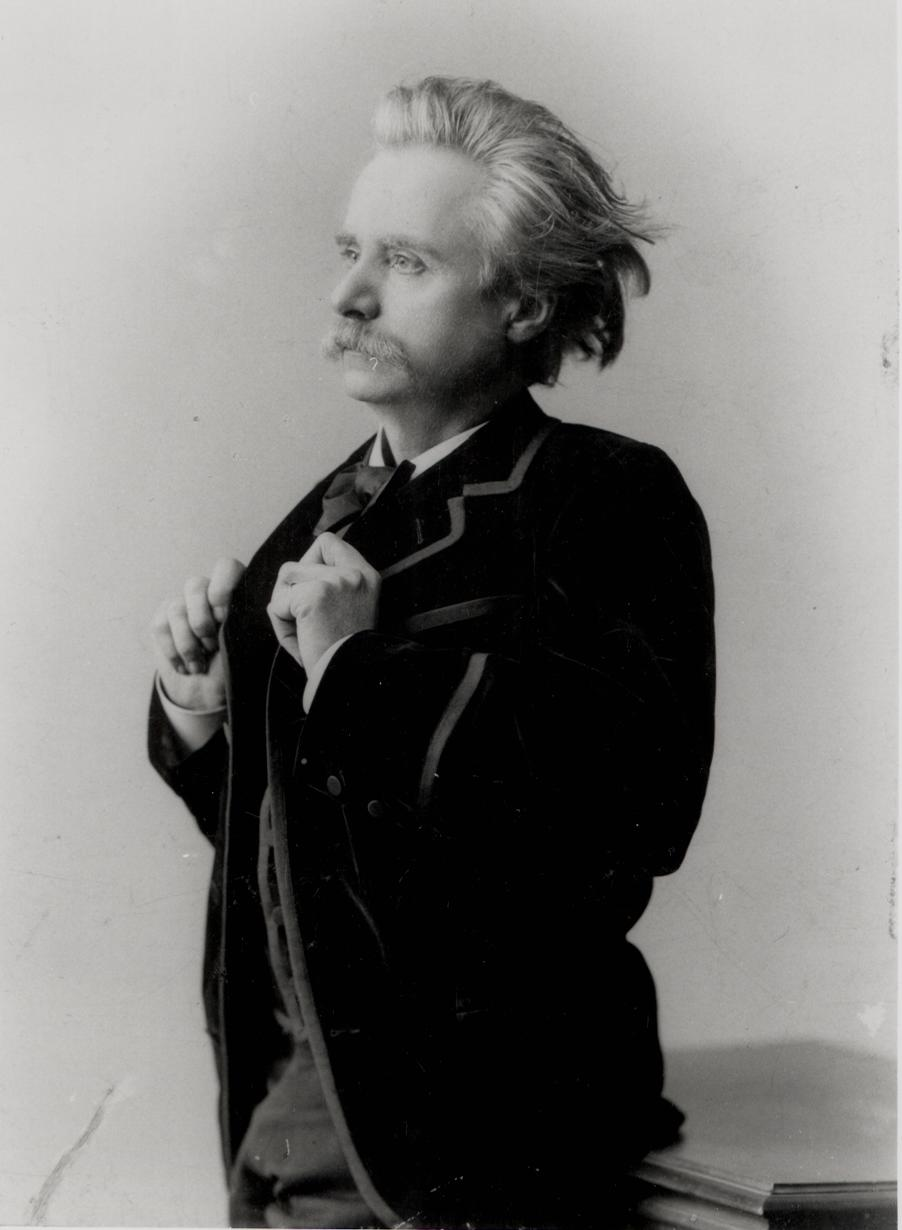
- Grieg in 1897
- Native name: Bryllupsdag på Troldhaugen
- Key: D major
- Opus: 65
- Year: 1896
- Meter: 4/4
- Published: 1897

Grieg plays the last part of "Wedding Day at Troldhaugen"
Recorded 1903

"Wedding Day at Troldhaugen" (Norwegian: "Bryllupsdag på Troldhaugen", literally "Wedding Anniversary at Troldhaugen") is a composition for piano by Edvard Grieg. It is the sixth piano piece in the eighth book of his Lyric Pieces, bearing the opus number 65.

== Description ==
Originally called "Gratulanterne kommer" (The well-wishers are coming), it was written in 1896 as a memorial of the 25th wedding anniversary of Grieg and his wife Nina. The anniversary celebration had been held in the Fossli Hotel near the Vøringfossen waterfall in June 1896. Grieg and his wife celebrated their wedding anniversary with Børre and Nancy Giertsen. Nancy was the sister of Marie Beyer, then married to Frants Beyer, Grieg's best friend. She belonged to their closest circle of friends at Troldhaugen. During the occasion a guest book was ready to take contributions from all the guests.

Grieg gave the work its final title in 1897 when he compiled Book VIII, Op. 65, of his Lyric Pieces. The work's festive march-like first section, describes congratulations and best wishes that are given by the guests to the couple; the second section is reflective and subdued. Most performances of this piece take about 5 to 6 minutes.
