= Skaupsjøen =

Lake in Eidfjord, Norway

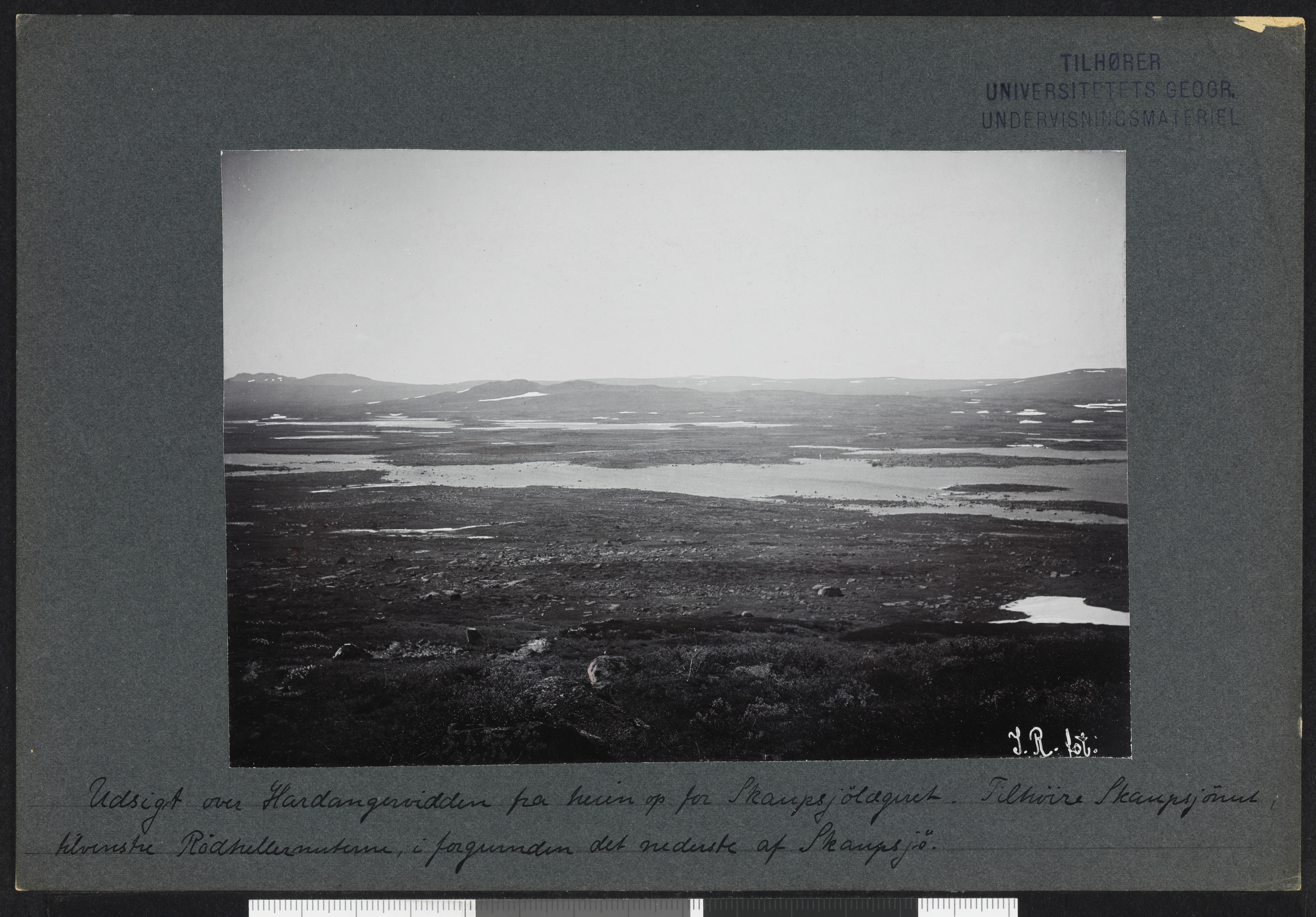
- Interactive map of Skaupsjøen
- Location: Eidfjord, Vestland and Nore og Uvdal, Buskerud
- Coordinates: 60.3467°N 7.6928°E
- Basin countries: Norway
- Max. length: 5 kilometres (3.1 mi)
- Max. width: 1 kilometre (0.62 mi)
- Surface area: 2.88 km^{2} (1.11 sq mi)
- Shore length^{1}: 26.24 kilometres (16.30 mi)
- Surface elevation: 1,158 metres (3,799 ft)
- References: NVE
- ^{1} Shore length is not a well-defined measure.

Skaupsjøen is a lake in Norway. It is located on the border of Nore og Uvdal Municipality in Buskerud county and Eidfjord Municipality in Vestland county. The 2.88-square-kilometre (1.11 sq mi) lake lies just north of the Hardangervidda National Park on the vast Hardangervidda plateau. The lake outflows to the river Skaupa, which flows into the larger lake Halnefjorden to the northeast. The nearest road access is the Norwegian National Road 7, which passes about 5 kilometres (3.1 mi) northwest of the lake.

== See also ==
- List of lakes in Norway
