= Sysen Dam =

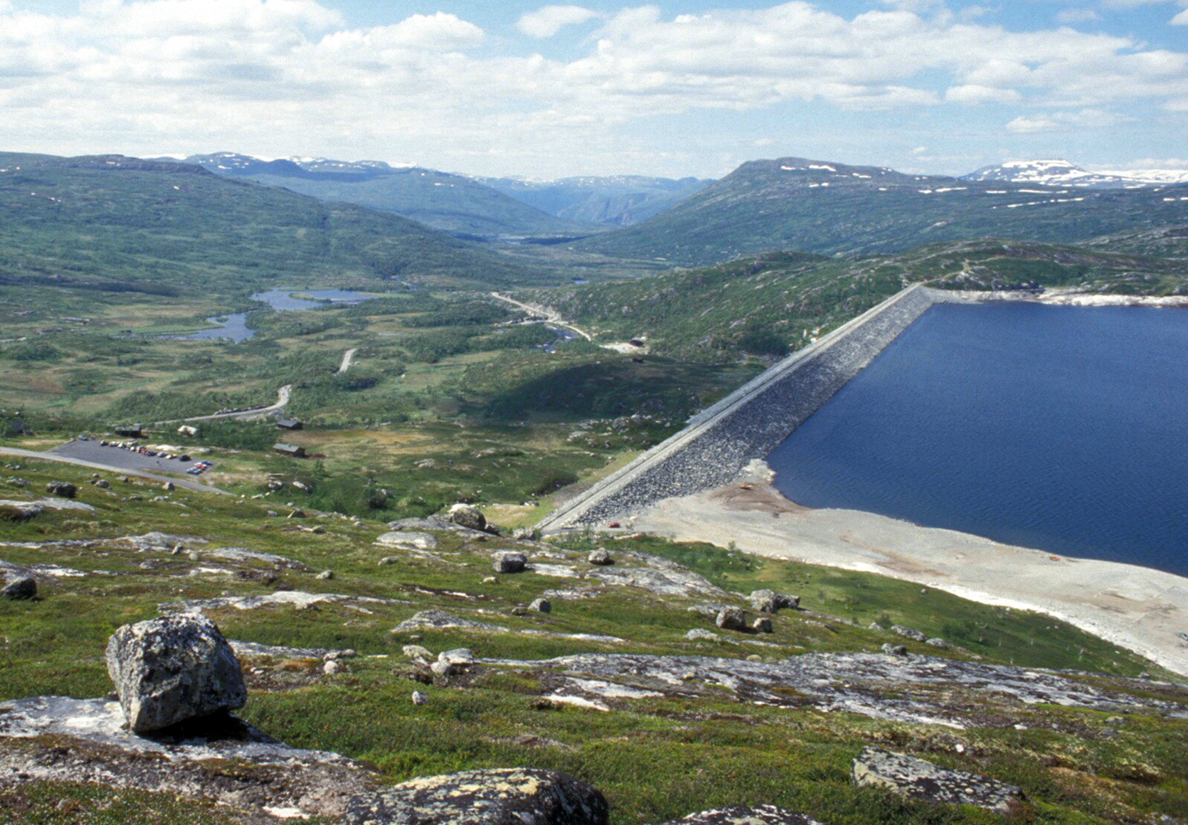
- The Sysen Dam
- Interactive map of Sysen Dam
- Location: Eidfjord Municipality, Norway
- Coordinates: 60.4046°N 7.3838°E
- Opening date: 1980

Dam and spillways
- Type of dam: Gravity dam
- Height: 81 meters (266 ft)
- Length: 1,157 meters (3,796 ft)
- Width (base): 248 meters (814 ft)

Reservoir
- Total capacity: 427 million cubic meters (15,100×10^{6} ft^{3})

The Sysen Dam (Norwegian: Sysendammen) is a rock-fill embankment dam in Eidfjord Municipality in Vestland county, Norway. The dam is 1,157 meters (3,796 ft) long, 81 meters (266 ft) high, and 258 meters (846 ft) wide at its base. It is built of 3.6 million cubic meters (130×10^{6} ft^{3}) of stone and moraine deposits.

The dam holds back Lake Sysen, which is the main reservoir for the Sy-Sima Hydroelectric Power Station. The average annual production of the power station is 1,115 gigawatt-hours (4,010 TJ). The reservoir capacity is 427 million cubic meters (346,000 acre⋅ft) and it is regulated at an elevation of 66 meters (217 ft).

The water supply to Vøring Falls is regulated by the dam, and there is a requirement for minimum water supply during the summer season.

The dam is a tourist attraction, and it can be accessed from Norwegian National Road 7.
