= Nordmannslågen =

Lake in Eidfjord, Norway

- Interactive map of Nordmannslågen
- Location: Eidfjord Municipality, Vestland
- Coordinates: 60.19661°N 7.4082°E
- Basin countries: Norway
- Max. length: 6.5 kilometres (4.0 mi)
- Max. width: 2.5 kilometres (1.6 mi)
- Surface area: 11.09 km^{2} (4.28 sq mi)
- Shore length^{1}: 50.29 kilometres (31.25 mi)
- Surface elevation: 1,244 metres (4,081 ft)
- References: NVE
- ^{1} Shore length is not a well-defined measure.

Nordmannslågen is a lake in Eidfjord Municipality in Vestland county, Norway. At 11.09 square kilometres (4.28 sq mi), it is the largest lake in southern part of Vestland county. The lake lies on the great Hardangervidda plateau in the central part of the Hardangervidda National Park. The lake lies about 35 kilometres (22 mi) southeast of the village of Eidfjord and about 50 kilometres (31 mi) northeast of the town of Odda. The lake is part of the headwaters of the river Numedalslågen.

== See also ==
- List of lakes in Norway
