= Eidfjordvatnet =

Lake in Eidfjord, Norway

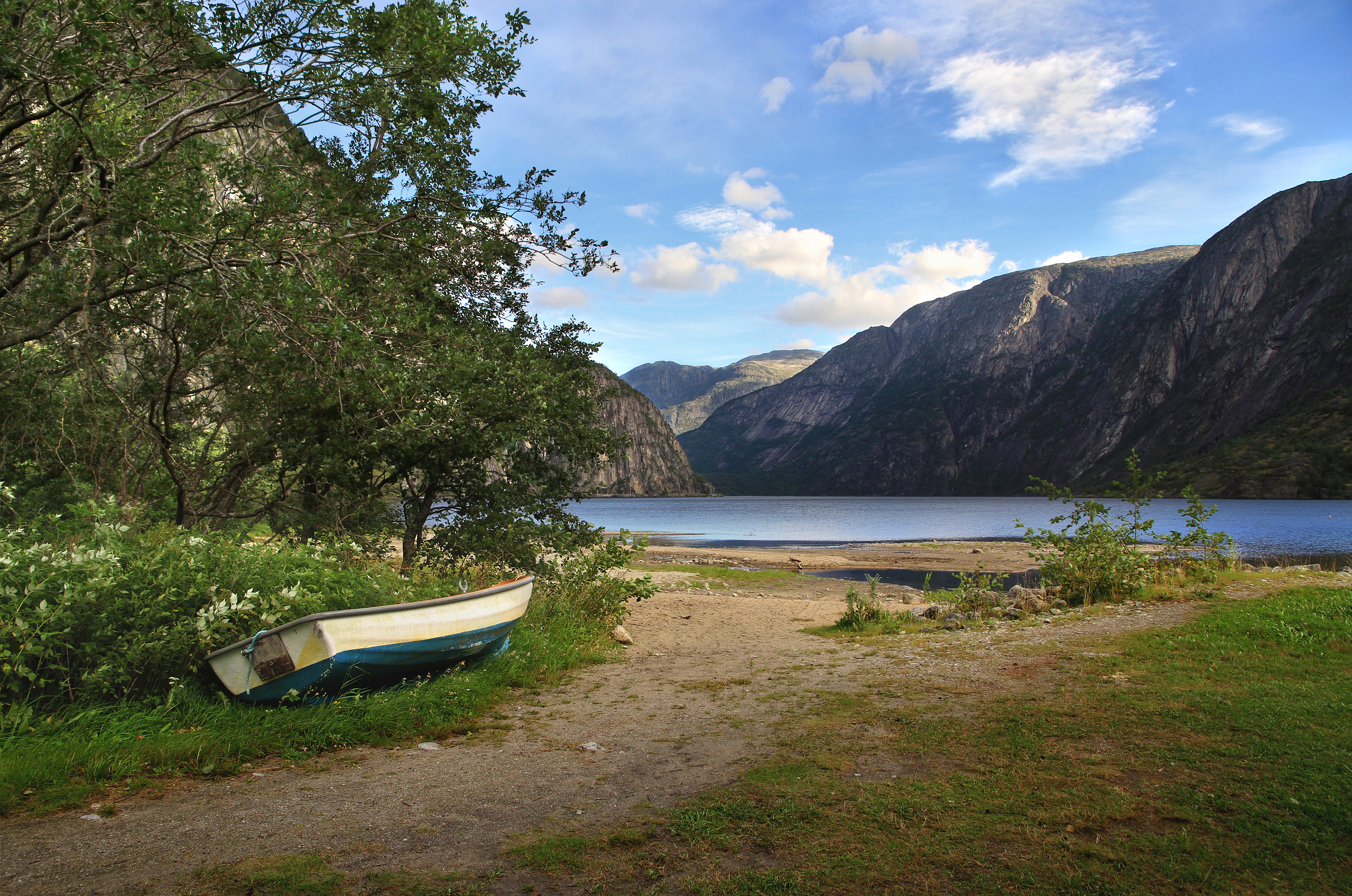
- A view to Eidfjordvatnet from the southern end of the lake in 2011.
- Interactive map of Eidfjordvatnet
- Location: Eidfjord Municipality, Vestland
- Coordinates: 60.4481°N 7.1080°E
- Primary inflows: Bjoreio, Veig
- Primary outflows: Eio
- Basin countries: Norway
- Max. length: 4 kilometres (2.5 mi)
- Max. width: 1.2 kilometres (0.75 mi)
- Surface area: 3.55 km^{2} (1.37 sq mi)
- Shore length^{1}: 9.53 kilometres (5.92 mi)
- Surface elevation: 19 metres (62 ft)
- References: NVE
- ^{1} Shore length is not a well-defined measure.

Eidfjordvatnet (English: Lake Eidfjord) is a moraine-dammed lake in Eidfjord Municipality in Vestland county, Norway. The 3.55-square-kilometre (1.37 sq mi) lake is located immediately southeast of the village of Eidfjord. The village of Øvre Eidfjord lies on the southern shore of the lake. Norwegian National Road 7 runs along the western shore of the lake. The water enters the lake through the Bjoreio and Veig rivers, and the water empties from the lake through the Eio River.

== See also ==
- List of lakes in Norway
