= Måbø Tunnel =

Norwegian Tunnel

Måbø Tunnel Måbøtunnelen
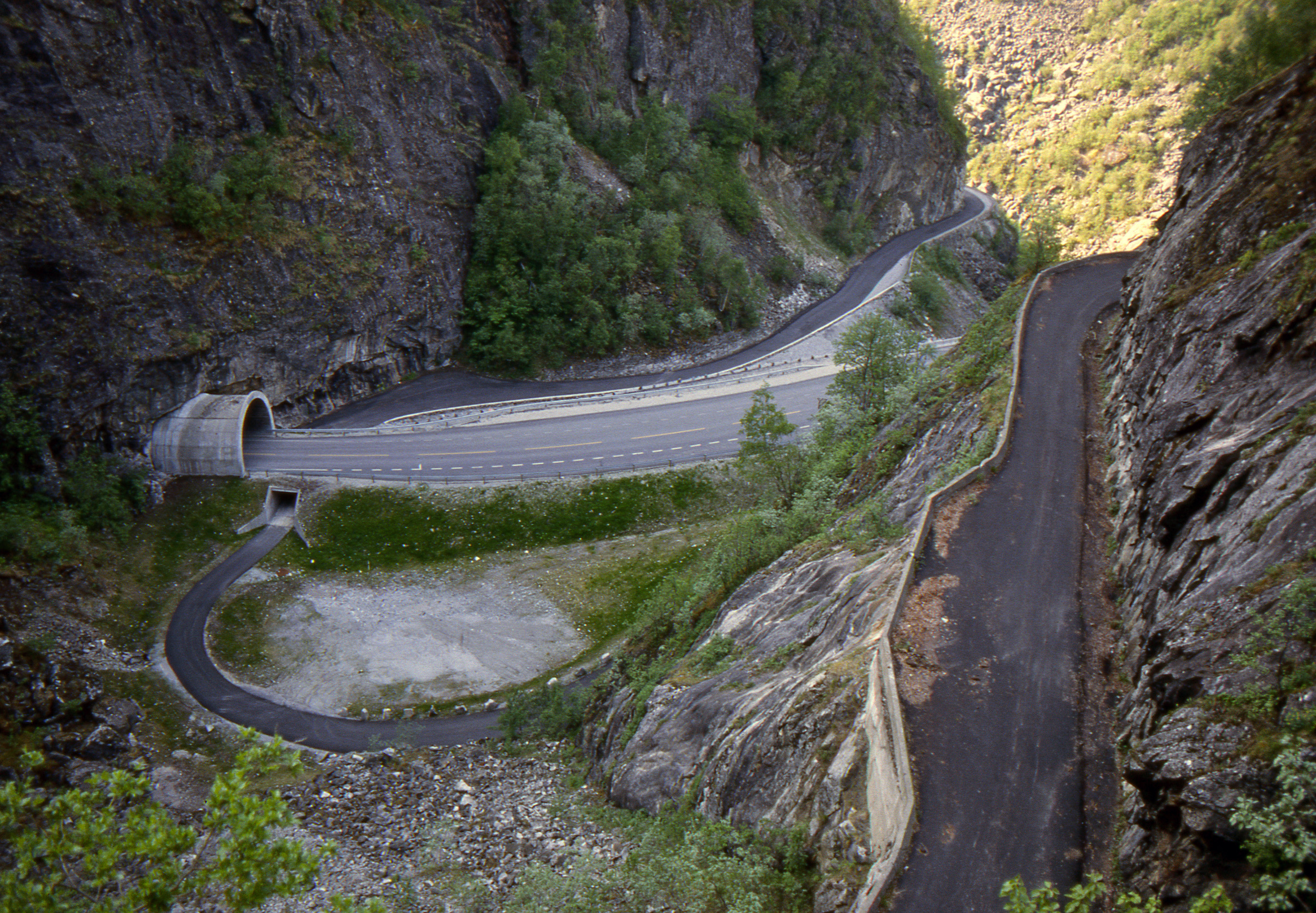
- The Storegjel Gorge with the Måbø Tunnel's east (upper) opening and parts of the old road
- Interactive map of Måbø Tunnel; Måbøtunnelen

Overview
- Location: Vestland, Norway
- Coordinates: 60°25′11″N 7°13′32″E
- Status: In use
- Route: Rv7
- Start: Lake Måbø, Eidfjord Municipality
- End: Storegjel Gorge, Eidfjord Municipality

Operation
- Opened: 1986
- Operator: Norwegian Public Roads Administration
- Character: Automotive

Technical
- Length: 1,893 meters (6,211 ft)
- Grade: 7%

The Måbø Tunnel (Norwegian: Måbøtunnelen) is a 1,893-meter (6,211 ft) tunnel along Norwegian National Road 7 in Eidfjord Municipality in Vestland county, Norway.

== History ==
The tunnel is the longest of the four tunnels in the Måbø Valley. It was completed in 1984 and was officially opened together with the other tunnels in 1986. The road and its tunnel system replaced the narrow and difficult road through the Måbø Valley that was opened in 1916.

=== Hiking and cycling route ===
The old route through the Måbø Valley has been preserved as a hiking and cycling route. The route has been included in the National Protection Plan for Roads, Bridges, and Road-Related Cultural Heritage and was protected by the Norwegian Directorate for Cultural Heritage in 2009.

=== Accident ===
On August 15, 1988, a bus carrying schoolchildren and parents from Kista, Sweden suffered a brake failure in the Måbø Tunnel and drove into the tunnel wall. Sixteen people died in the accident, including 12 children 11 and 12 years old.
