= Sysenvatnet =

Lake in Eidfjord, Norway

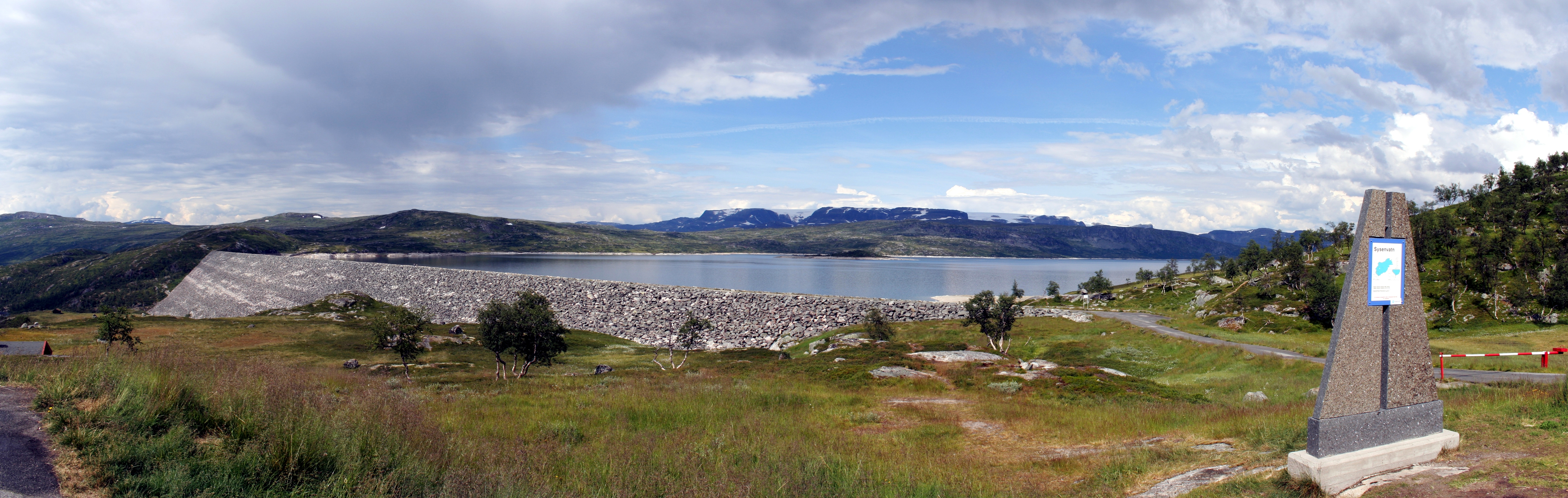
- View of the dam at the south end of the lake
- Interactive map of Sysenvatnet
- Location: Eidfjord Municipality, Vestland
- Coordinates: 60.4176°N 7.4188°E
- Basin countries: Norway
- Max. length: 5.5 kilometres (3.4 mi)
- Max. width: 3 kilometres (1.9 mi)
- Surface area: 10.24 km^{2} (3.95 sq mi)
- Shore length^{1}: 17.27 kilometres (10.73 mi)
- Surface elevation: 940 metres (3,080 ft)
- References: NVE
- ^{1} Shore length is not a well-defined measure.

Sysenvatnet (English: Lake Sysen) is a lake in Eidfjord Municipality in Vestland county, Norway. The 10.24-square-kilometre (3.95 sq mi) lake lies at the north end of the Sysendalen valley, about 8 kilometres (5.0 mi) east of the famous Vøringsfossen waterfall. The lake is dammed on the south end by a large stone embankment, which is used as the main reservoir for the Sima Hydroelectric Power Station. The Sysen Dam can be seen from Norwegian National Road 7, which runs near the lake's southern shore.

== See also ==
- List of lakes in Norway
