= Måbødalen bus accident =

1988 bus crash in Norway

- Date: 15 August 1988
- Location: Måbø Valley in Norway; 60°25′29″N 007°14′06″E
- Type: Bus accident
- Deaths: 16 (last death 12 days after crash)

The Måbødalen bus accident or Måbø Canyon bus accident was a bus crash on 15 August 1988 during the descent from Hardangervidda into the Måbø Valley on the way to Bergen, Norway. The bus collided with the concrete arch at the exit of the Måbø Tunnel on Norwegian National Road 7. Of the 34 passengers aboard, 15 were killed. In addition, the bus driver died from his injuries 12 days after the crash.

== Crash ==
The bus was a Volvo B58 built in 1977 and owned by the Swedish company "All the Way". It had been chartered for a school trip, carrying fifth graders from Kista in Sweden to Bergen, from where they were scheduled to continue to Shetland.

Twelve of the passengers who died were children, while three were parents. The 44-year-old driver, Kent Sören Byström, was recovered alive from the wreck and was able to testify to investigators, but he succumbed from his injuries on August 27 at a hospital in Stockholm.

The tragedy was deeply felt in Norway and Sweden, becoming one of the deadliest disasters in Norwegian history and one of the worst in Scandinavian history.

== Investigation ==
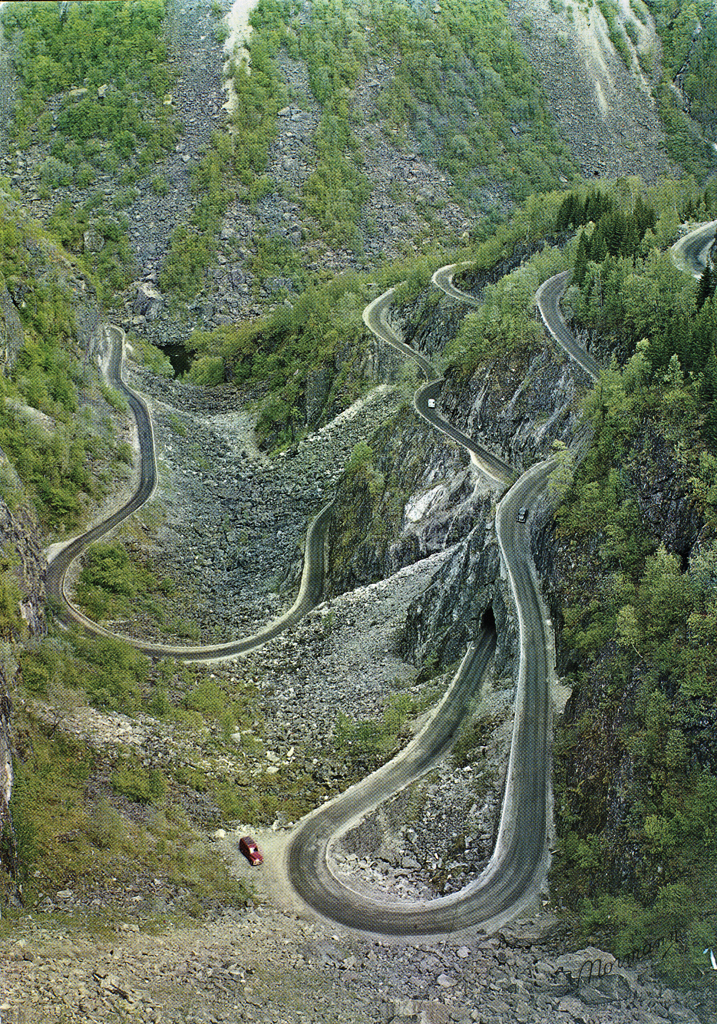
Måbødalen

Police investigations concluded that no person could be held accountable for the accident.

The main cause of the crash was determined to be faulty brakes on the bus. Only two of the four wheels had brakes, and an auxiliary electric brake was not functioning. The road through the Måbø Valley features fairly steep gradients over a long stretch, as much as 8% over a distance of 4 kilometres (2.5 mi). The heavy use of the braking system caused it to gradually overheat, finally failing completely. An attempt from the driver to switch to a lower gear failed, and left the wheels entirely decoupled from the engine. Without anything to slow the bus down, the bus gathered speed on the downhill stretch.

At the time of the collision, at about 18:30, the bus was estimated to be moving at 64 to 100 kilometres per hour (40 to 62 mph).

Beyond the end of the tunnel is a 20–30-metre (66–98 ft) cliff, and there was speculation that the driver deliberately steered the bus into the tunnel wall in order to prevent an even worse accident from happening. In his testimony, the driver said he had considered using the wall to slow the bus down, though the investigation showed that there was no contact with the wall before the final crash.

Vehicle brakes frequently overheat along the steep road in the Måbø Valley, with a number of lorries catching fire and at least one fatal truck accident in 1998. Additional causes were the driver's lack of experience in driving in long downhill stretches, and the lack of adequate warning signs along the road.

== Aftermath ==
The psychological effects on the survivors were studied up to twenty years after the accident, unusually long for an accident of this nature. Several of the survivors, as well as the witnesses who arrived immediately after the disaster, continue to suffer from the traumatic experience.

== See also ==
- Beaune coach crash
- Sierre coach crash
- Runaway truck ramp
