= Kvernhushaug Tunnel =

Tunnel in Norway

Kvernhushaug Tunnel Kvernhushaugtunnelen
- Interactive map of Kvernhushaug Tunnel; Kvernhushaugtunnelen

Overview
- Location: Vestland, Norway
- Coordinates: 60°25′17″N 7°12′28″E
- Status: In use
- Route: Rv7

Operation
- Opened: June 13, 1986; 40 years ago
- Operator: Norwegian Public Roads Administration
- Character: Automotive

Technical
- Length: 542 meters (1,778 ft)

The Kvernhushaug Tunnel (Norwegian: Kvernhushaugtunnelen) is a 542-meter (1,778 ft) tunnel along Norwegian National Road 7 in Eidfjord Municipality in Vestland county, Norway.

The tunnel was officially opened together with the other tunnels in the valley in 1986. It lies at an elevation of 364 meters (1,194 ft).
