= Øvre Eidfjord =

Village in Eidfjord Municipality, Norway

- Village
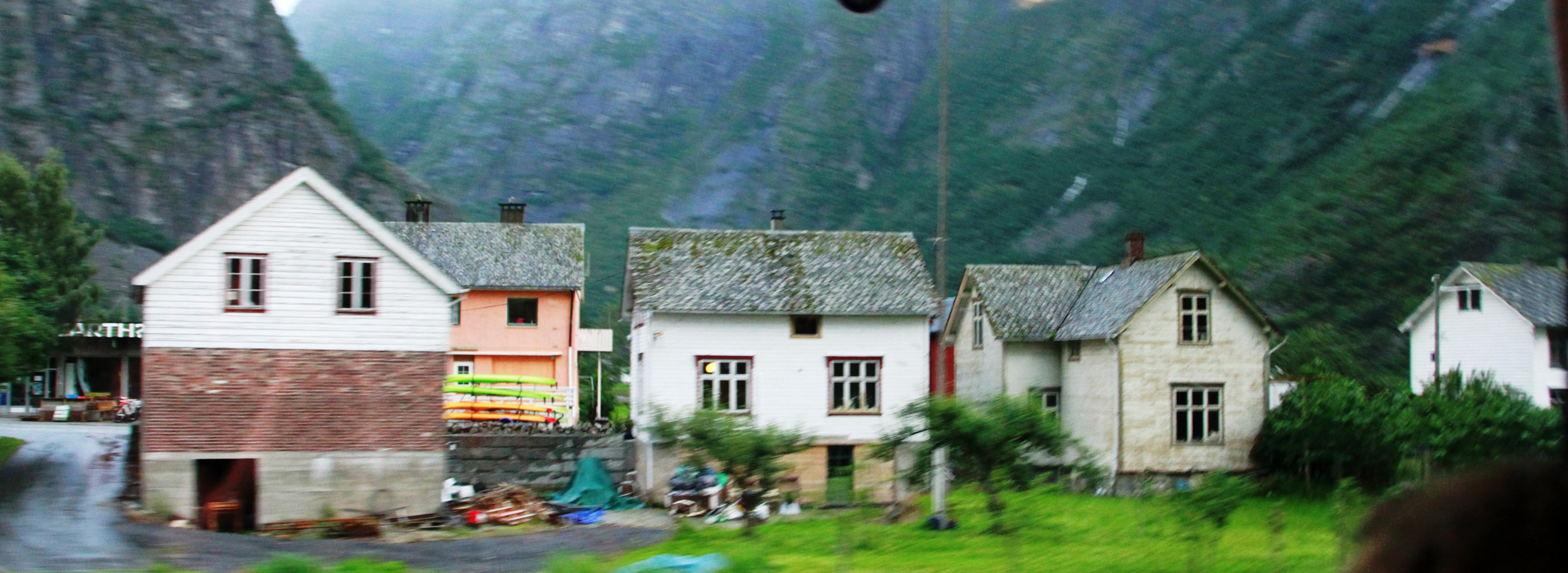
- View of the village
- Interactive map of Øvre Eidfjord
- Coordinates: 60.42335°N 7.13002°E
- Country: Norway
- Region: Western Norway
- County: Vestland
- District: Hardanger
- Municipality: Eidfjord Municipality
- Elevation: 33 m (108 ft)
- Time zone: UTC+01:00 (CET)
  - Summer (DST): UTC+02:00 (CEST)
- Post Code: 5784 Øvre Eidfjord

Øvre Eidfjord is a village in Eidfjord Municipality in Vestland county, Norway. The village is located at the southern end of the lake Eidfjordvatnet, about 7 kilometres (4.3 mi) south of the municipal centre of Eidfjord. Øvre Eidfjord sits along the river Bjoreio, at the entrance to the Måbødalen valley. There are about 200 residents of Øvre Eidfjord.

The Norwegian National Road 7 runs through Øvre Eidfjord, through the Måbødalen valley, past the famous Vøringfossen waterfall, and then continues on, over the Hardangervidda plateau to Eastern Norway. The Hardangervidda Natursenter, the visitor centre for the nearby Hardangervidda National Park, is located here in Øvre Eidfjord.

There was a primary school in Øvre Eidfjord until 2005 when it was closed. Since then, local students have had to travel 7 kilometres (4.3 mi) to Eidfjord for their schooling.
