= Halnefjorden =

Lake in Norway

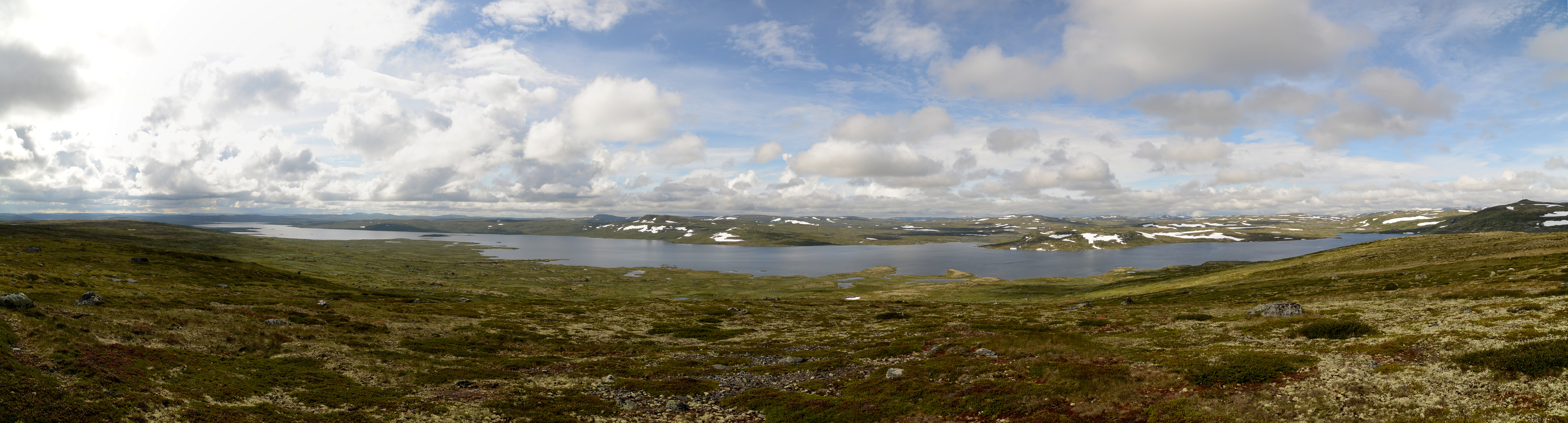
- 180 degrees view of Halnefjorden from Halnetunga
- Interactive map of Halnefjorden
- Location: Vestland and Buskerud
- Coordinates: 60.4039°N 7.7124°E
- Basin countries: Norway
- Max. length: 11.2 kilometres (7.0 mi)
- Max. width: 2.3 kilometres (1.4 mi)
- Surface area: 13.61 km^{2} (5.25 sq mi)
- Shore length^{1}: 39.83 kilometres (24.75 mi)
- Surface elevation: 1,130 metres (3,710 ft)
- References: NVE
- ^{1} Shore length is not a well-defined measure.

Halnefjorden is a large lake on the border of Vestland and Buskerud counties in Norway. It is located in Hol Municipality and Nore og Uvdal Municipality in Buskerud county and in Eidfjord Municipality in Vestland county. At 13.61 square kilometres (5.25 sq mi), it is among the largest lakes located on the vast Hardangervidda plateau. The Norwegian National Road 7 runs along the northern shore of the lake, and that is the only road access to the lake. The lake is one of the headwaters of the river Numedalslågen.

== See also ==
- List of lakes in Norway
