= Lyric Pieces =

Collection of short piano pieces by Edvard Grieg

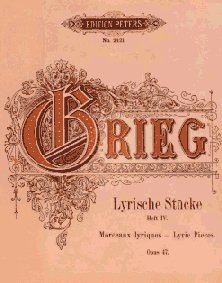
Title page of the fourth volume of Lyric Pieces

Lyric Pieces (Norwegian: Lyriske stykker) is a collection of 66 short pieces for solo piano written by Edvard Grieg. They were published in 10 volumes, from 1867 (Op. 12) to 1901 (Op. 71). The collection includes several of his best known pieces, such as "Wedding Day at Troldhaugen" ("Bryllupsdag på Troldhaugen"), "To Spring" ("Til våren"), "March of the Trolls" ("Trolltog"), and "Butterfly" ("Sommerfugl").

The theme of the first piece in the set, "Arietta", was one of the composer's favorite melodies. He used it to complete the cycle in his last lyric piece, "Remembrances" ("Efterklang") — this time as a waltz.

The first complete recording of the Lyric Pieces was recorded and released in the Soviet Union by Aleksandr Goldenweiser in the 1950s. In 2002, Norwegian pianist Leif Ove Andsnes recorded a CD with 24 of the lyric pieces on Grieg's own 1892 Steinway grand piano at Troldhaugen, the composer's residence. Among other notable pianists to have made recordings of the collection are Daniel Gortler, Håkon Austbø, Aldo Ciccolini, Andrei Gavrilov, Walter Gieseking, Emil Gilels, Stephen Hough, Eva Knardahl, Juhani Lagerspetz, Daniel Levy, Gerhard Oppitz, Javier Perianes, Sviatoslav Richter and Einar Steen-Nøkleberg. A few recordings and piano rolls of Grieg himself performing also exist, and they have been published by the Norwegian record label Simax.

Four of the six pieces from Book V, Op. 54, were orchestrated under the title of Lyric Suite. Both Grieg and Anton Seidl had a hand in the orchestrations. Grieg also orchestrated two of the pieces from Book IX, Op. 68.

== Complete listing ==
Even though it was published in several volumes, some publishers, such as Edition Peters, have numbered the pieces as a whole, thereby numbering the 66 pieces in order, instead of numbering each volume individually.

=== Book I, Op. 12 ===
Composed 1866–1867(?); published 1867.

"Folkevise" ("Folk Song")
Performed by Constantin Stephan

1. Arietta
2. Vals (Waltz)
3. Vektersang (Watchman's song, after Macbeth)
4. Alfedans (Elves' Dance)
5. Folkevise (Folk Song)
6. Norsk (Norwegian Melody)
7. Albumblad (Albumleaf)
8. Fedrelandssang (National Song)

=== Book II, Op. 38 ===
Composed 1883 except where noted; published 1883.

1. Berceuse
2. Folkevise (Folk Song)
3. Melodi (Melody)
4. Halling (Dance)
5. Springdans (Spring Dance)
6. Elegi (Elegy)
7. Vals (Waltz, originally composed 1866; revised 1883)
8. Kanon (Canon, composed ca. 1877-8?; revised 1883)

=== Book III, Op. 43 ===
Composed probably 1886; published 1886; dedicated to Isidor Seiss).

"Sommerfugl" ("Butterfly")
Played by Grieg in 1906

"Småfugl" ("Little Bird")
Captured from digital piano

"Til våren" ("To Spring")
Captured from digital piano

1. Sommerfugl (Butterfly)
2. Ensom vandrer (Lonely Wanderer)
3. I hjemmet (In My Homeland)
4. Småfugl (Little Bird)
5. Erotikk (Erotikon)
6. Til våren (To Spring)

=== Book IV, Op. 47 ===
Composed 1886–1888 except where noted; published 1888.

"Albumblad" ("Albumleaf")
Captured from digital piano

1. Valse-Impromptu
2. Albumblad (Albumleaf)
3. Melodi (Melody)
4. Halling
5. Melankoli (Melancholy)
6. Springtanz (Spring Dance, composed 1872?; revised 1888)
7. Elegi (Elegy)

=== Book V, Op. 54 ===
Composed 1889–1891; published 1891; nos. 1–4 later orchestrated as Lyric Suite.

"Trolltog" ("March of the Trolls")
Captured from digital piano

"Notturno"
Performed live by Mark Gasser

1. Gjetergutt (Shepherd's Boy)
2. Gangar (Norwegian March)
3. Trolltog (March of the Trolls)
4. Notturno
5. Scherzo
6. Klokkeklang (Bell Sound)

=== Book VI, Op. 57 ===
Composed 1890?–1893; published 1893.

1. Svundne dager (Vanished Days)
2. Gade
3. Illusjon (Illusion)
4. Geheimniss (Secret)
5. Sie tanzt (She Dances)
6. Heimweh (Homesickness)

=== Book VII, Op. 62 ===
Composed 1893?–1895; published 1895.

1. Sylfide (Sylph)
2. Takk (Gratitude)
3. Fransk serenade (French Serenade)
4. Bekken (Brooklet)
5. Drømmesyn (Phantom)
6. Hjemad (Homeward)

=== Book VIII, Op. 65 ===
Composed 1896; published 1897.

"Bryllupsdag på Troldhaugen" ("Wedding Day at Troldhaugen")
Played by Grieg in 1903

"Bryllupsdag på Troldhaugen" ("Wedding Day at Troldhaugen")
Captured from digital piano

1. Fra ungdomsdagene (From My Youth)
2. Bondens sang (Peasant's Song)
3. Tungsinn (Melancholy)
4. Salong (Salon)
5. I balladetone (Ballad)
6. Bryllupsdag på Troldhaugen ("Wedding Day at Troldhaugen")

=== Book IX, Op. 68 ===
Composed 1898–1899; published 1899; nos. 4 and 5 were orchestrated in 1899.

1. Matrosenes oppsang (Sailors' Song)
2. Bestemors menuet (Grandmother's Minuet)
3. For dine føtter (At Your Feet)
4. Aften på højfjellet (Evening in the Mountains)
5. Bådnlåt (At the Cradle)
6. Valse mélancolique (Melancholy Waltz)

=== Book X, Op. 71 ===
Composed and published 1901.

"Sommeraften" ("Summer's Eve")
Performed by Constantin Stephan

"Småtroll" ("Puck")
Captured from digital piano

1. Det var engang (Once upon a Time)
2. Sommeraften (Summer's Eve)
3. Småtroll (Puck)
4. Skogstillhet (Peace in the Woods)
5. Halling
6. Forbi (Gone)
7. Efterklang (Remembrances)
