= Eio (river) =

River in Vestland, Norway

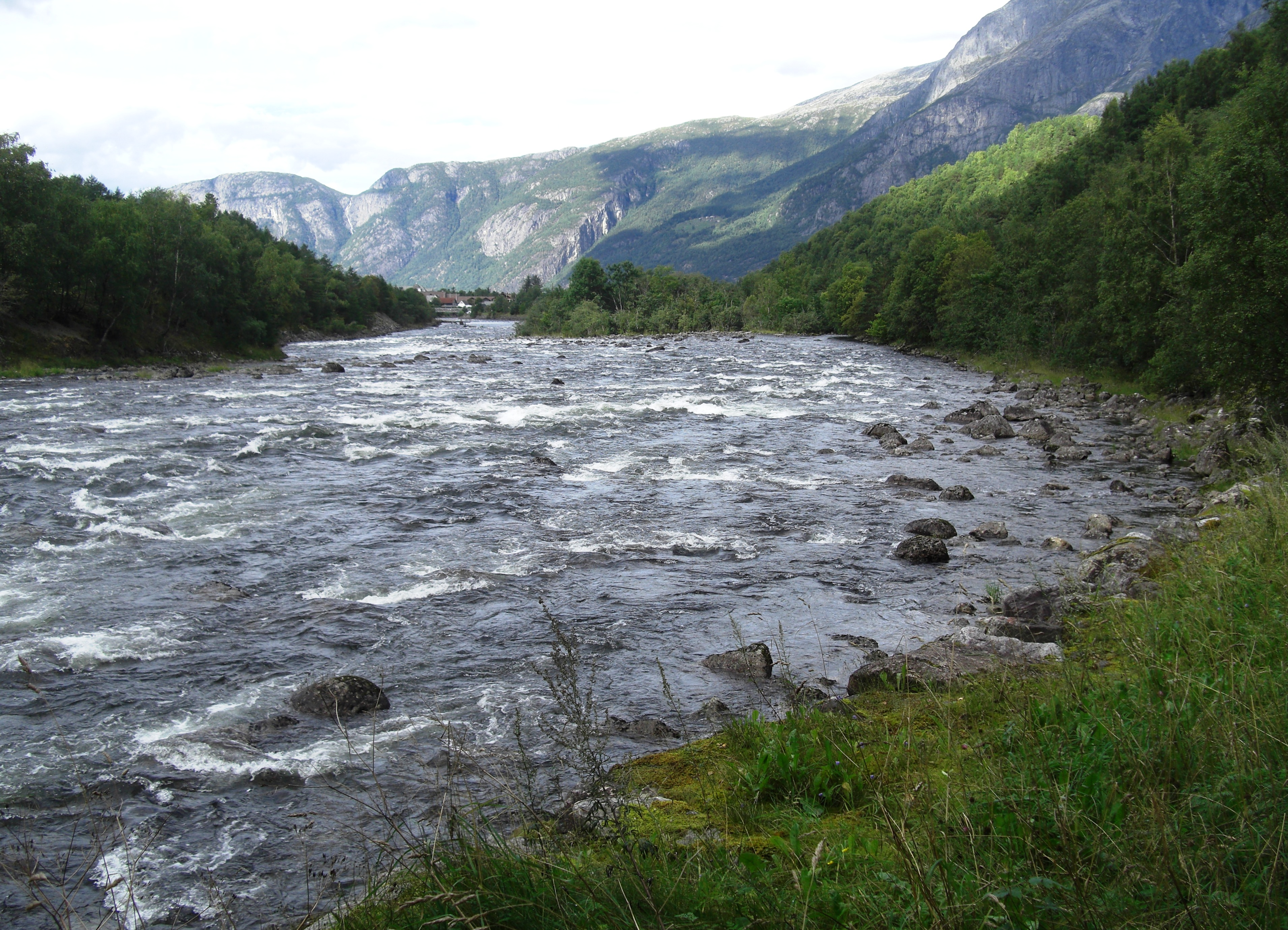

Location
- Country: Norway
- County: Vestland
- Municipalities: Eidfjord Municipality

Physical characteristics
- Source: Lake Eidfjord
  - location: Eidfjord Municipality, Norway
  - coordinates: 60.45743°N 7.093455°E
  - elevation: 17.5 m (57 ft)
- Mouth: Eid Fjord
  - location: Eidfjord Municipality, Norway
  - coordinates: 60.469451°N 7.070206°E
  - elevation: 0 m (0 ft)
- Length: 2.1 km (1.3 mi)
- Basin size: 1,174 km^{2} (453 sq mi)

The Eio is a short but powerful river in Eidfjord Municipality in Vestland county, Norway. It runs from Lake Eidfjord into Eid Fjord and is 2.1 kilometers (1.3 mi) long. The river is the lowermost part of the Eidfjord river system, which, in addition to the Eio, includes the Bjoreio and Veig rivers, which flow into Lake Eidfjord. The river system has a drainage basin of 1,174 square kilometers (453 sq mi) and a length of 78.5 kilometers (48.8 mi) reckoned from the furthest source of the Bjoreio on the Hardanger Plateau to the mouth of the Eio in the fjord.

== See also ==
- List of rivers in Norway
