= Tinnhølen =

Lake in Eidfjord, Norway

- Tinnhylen (unofficial)
- Interactive map of Tinnhølen
- Location: Eidfjord Municipality, Vestland and Nore og Uvdal, Buskerud
- Coordinates: 60.2656°N 7.6011°E
- Basin countries: Norway
- Max. length: 5 kilometres (3.1 mi)
- Max. width: 1.8 kilometres (1.1 mi)
- Surface area: 4.57 km^{2} (1.76 sq mi)
- Shore length^{1}: 18.85 kilometres (11.71 mi)
- Surface elevation: 1,213 metres (3,980 ft)
- References: NVE
- ^{1} Shore length is not a well-defined measure.

Tinnhølen is a lake in Norway that lies in Eidfjord Municipality in Vestland county and a very small part crosses into Nore og Uvdal Municipality in Buskerud county. The lake lies just inside Hardangervidda National Park on the vast Hardangervidda plateau. The northern part of the lake is accessible by road.

== See also ==
- List of lakes in Norway
