= Måbødalen =

Valley in Eidfjord, Norway

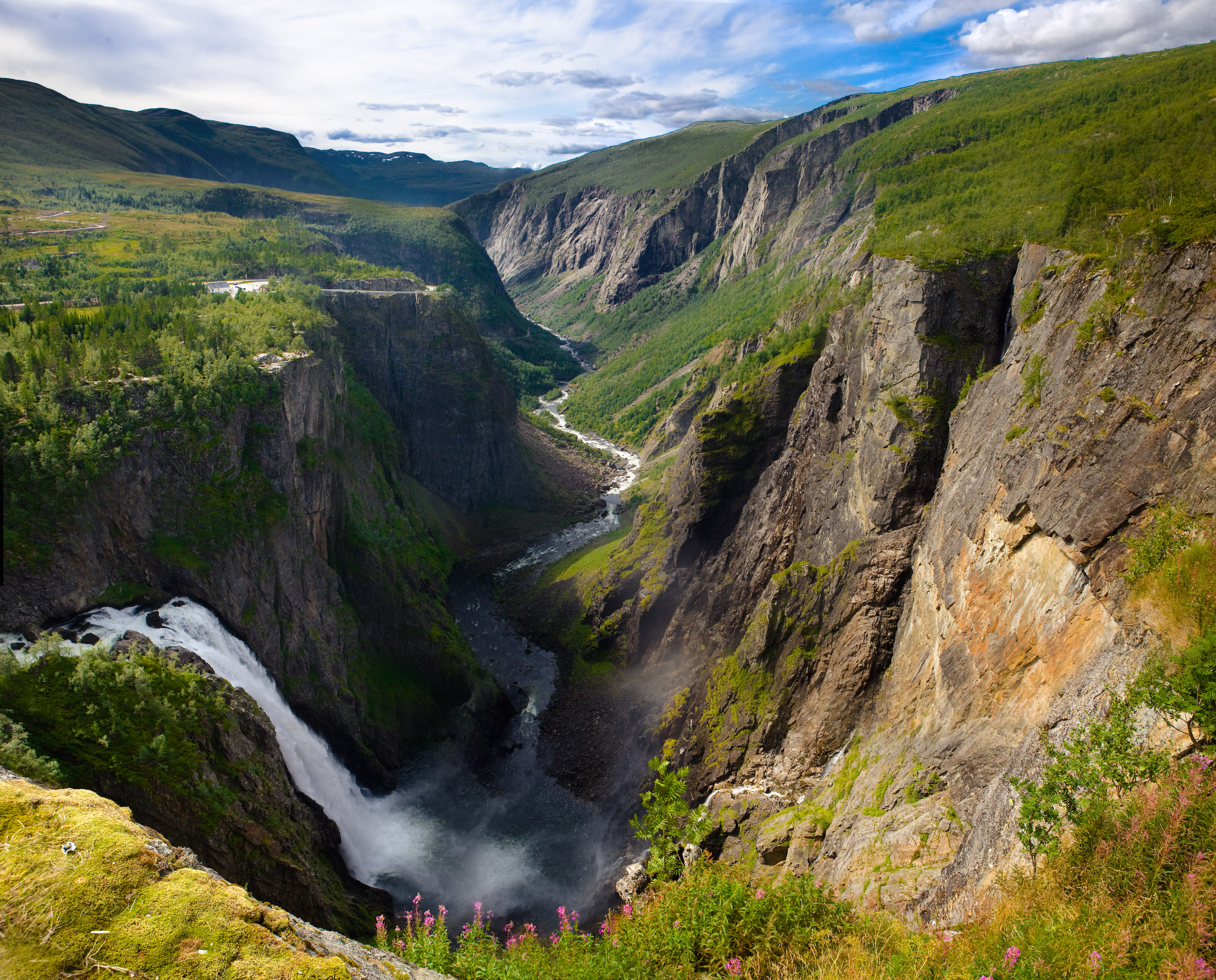
- View of the Vøringsfossen and the Måbødalen canyon
- Floor elevation: 74 m (243 ft)
- Length: 7 km (4.3 mi) E-W
- Width: 800 m (2,600 ft)

Geology
- Type: River canyon

Geography
- Location: Vestland, Norway
- Population centers: Øvre Eidfjord
- Coordinates: 60°25′01″N 07°08′51″E
- River: Bjoreio River

Location
- Interactive map of Måbødalen

Måbødalen (English: Måbø Valley) is a narrow valley in Eidfjord Municipality in Vestland county, Norway. The 7-kilometre (4.3 mi) long valley begins at the village of Øvre Eidfjord and ends at the Sysendalen valley on the western side of the Hardangervidda plateau. The valley contains one of the most notable waterfalls in the country: Vøringsfossen, which is easily accessible via Norwegian National Road 7 (Rv7).

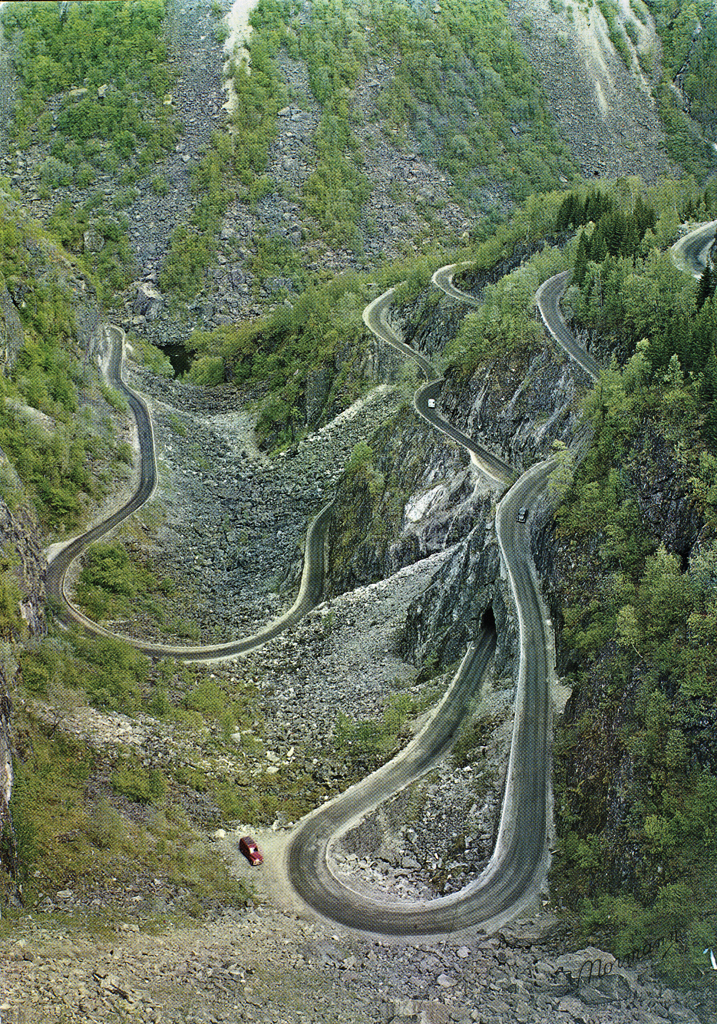
View of the "old" road through Måbødalen

The first road through the Måbødalen valley was built from 1900 to 1916. Consisting of three tunnels and three bridges, including the Måbø Bridge, it is characterized by its many hairpin turns. The road is widely used by pedestrians and cyclists today and it is regarded as a good example of early 20th century road engineering. This was the first road connection between Eastern and Western Norway over the Hardangervidda plateau when it was finally completed in 1928. A new road through Måbødalen was opened in 1986, and it replaced the old road (which was not removed). The new road is wider and has many more tunnels to replace the narrow, old road and all its hairpin turns. The Måbødalen bus accident occurred in 1988 on the new road.

The Fossli Hotel is situated on top of the mountain, overlooking the Måbødalen valley and the Vøringsfossen waterfall, just off Rv7. The hotel owns a Zimmermann piano where Edvard Grieg composed Norwegian Folk Songs, Opus 66 (1896). In 1854, Johan Christian Dahl painted Måbødalen, a landscape painting of the area. The painting is in the art museum in Bergen.
