= Zimmermann (piano) =

German piano maker

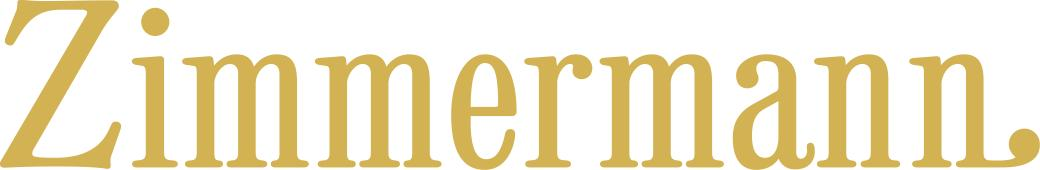

Zimmermann is a German former piano maker and remains as a brand name.

== History ==
The company founder worked for the piano company Steinway & Sons in New York City, United States, before starting his own factory in Leipzig, Germany, in 1884.

As business grew, the Zimmermann company expanded to a second factory in 1904. By 1912 over 10,000 pianos were being built a year making it one of the Europe’s largest piano manufacturers. Later, it became a global piano exporter within over 400,000 instruments sold world-wide.

In 1992, C. Bechstein took over the company and incorporated it in its Product Range. Until 2011, Zimmermann pianos have been produced in Saxony like all Bechstein Instruments, where the Bechstein company regrouped its production facilities. Today modern Zimmermann pianos are produced in China within the control of Bechstein Quality Management System.
