= Vøringsfossen =

Vøringsfossen Vøringen
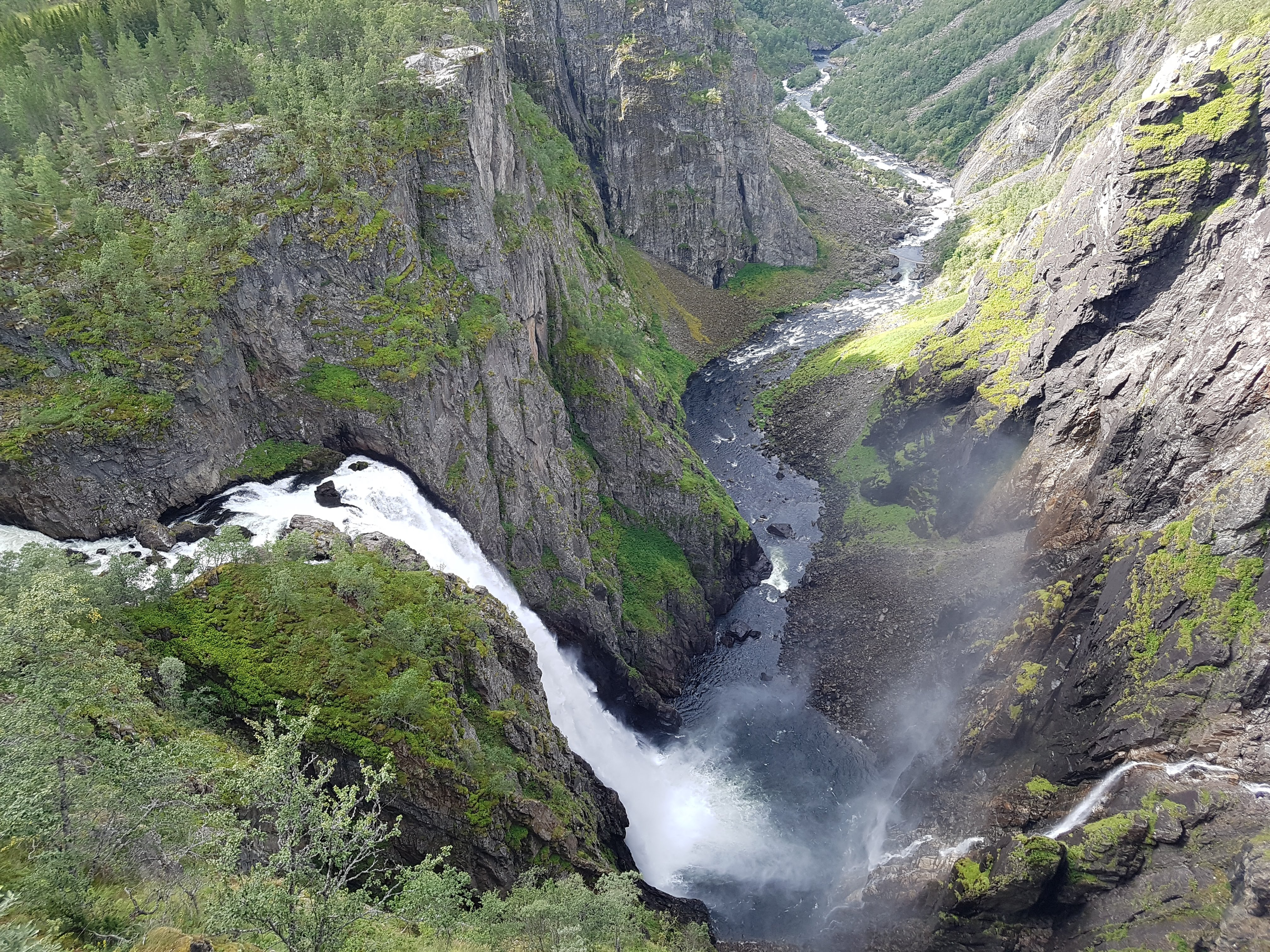
- Vøringsfossen, view from the top of Måbødalen.
- Interactive map of Vøringsfossen; Vøringen
- Location: Vestland, Norway
- Coordinates: 60°25′36.8″N 7°15′4.1″E
- Type: Tiered Plunges
- Total height: 182 metres (597 ft)
- Number of drops: 5
- Longest drop: 163 metres (535 ft)
- Average width: 23 metres (75 ft)
- Run: 122 metres (400 ft)
- Watercourse: Bjoreio
- Average flow rate: 12 cubic metres per second (420 cu ft/s)

Vøringsfossen or Vøringen (English: Vøring Falls) is the 83rd highest waterfall in Norway on the basis of total fall. It lies at the top of the Måbødalen valley in Eidfjord Municipality in Vestland county. It is located near Norwegian National Road 7, which connects Oslo with Bergen. It has a total drop of 182 metres (597 ft), and a major drop of 163 metres (535 ft). It is perhaps the most famous waterfall in the country and a major tourist attraction on the road down from the Hardangervidda plateau to Hardangerfjord.

There are several warning signs in regard to the dangers of falling to one's death. Other measures for preventing deaths were planned for implementation in the spring of 2015, and a stairway bridge opened in 2020.

== Name ==
The name Vøringsfossen (Old Norse: Vyrðingr) is derived from the verb vyrða (English: esteem, revere). The last element fossen, the definite form of foss (waterfall), is a later addition. An alternate name that is co-official is Vøringen.

== History ==
The waterfall was hardly known by anyone other than locals until 1821. In that year professor Christopher Hansteen, who was on his way to the Hardangervidda plateau to make astronomical observations, estimated the height of the waterfall to be about 280 metres (920 ft) by throwing stones down from the edge and measuring the time they took to fall with his pocket watch. In 1893 it was measured with a string, and the real height was revealed to be 163 metres (535 ft).

In 1880 Ola Garen decided to build a hotel at top of the waterfall. The only way up there was a path with 1,500 stairs up Måbøbjerget together with a bridle path that had been built in 1872 to carry English tourists to the waterfall. In 1891 a new road with tunnels was built along Eidfjordvandet, and in the same year the Fossli Hotel was finished, designed in Art Nouveau style by architect Frederik Konow Lund. All materials for the construction had to be carried on horseback from Eidfjord up to the top of the hill. Around the year 1900 large cruise ships began to visit Eidfjord, and from there passengers were transported by horse and wagon up the valley.

The composer Edvard Grieg had a log cabin nearby and was a frequent visitor to the falls.

A video of Voringsfossen showing the volume of waterfall in summer

== Hydroelectric ==
The Bjoreio, the small river that flows into Vøringsfossen has a hydroelectric dam in the Sysendalen valley above the falls. The water volume in the river is regulated in connection with power development, but there are requirements for minimum water flow of 12 m^{3}/s (420 cu ft/s) above its natural rate in the summer, not enough to benefit the tourist trade.

== Pedestrian bridge ==
A pedestrian bridge has been placed across the ravine in sections by helicopter. One side is 16 metres (52 ft) higher than the other, and its length is 47 metres (154 ft). The design is by Carl-Viggo Holmebakk. An article in Dagsavisen described it as a bridge reminiscent of "a collapsed scaffold for construction, across" the ravine.

== See also ==
- List of waterfalls
