= Eidfjord Municipality =

Municipality in Vestland, Norway

Eidfjord Municipality Eidfjord kommune
- Municipality
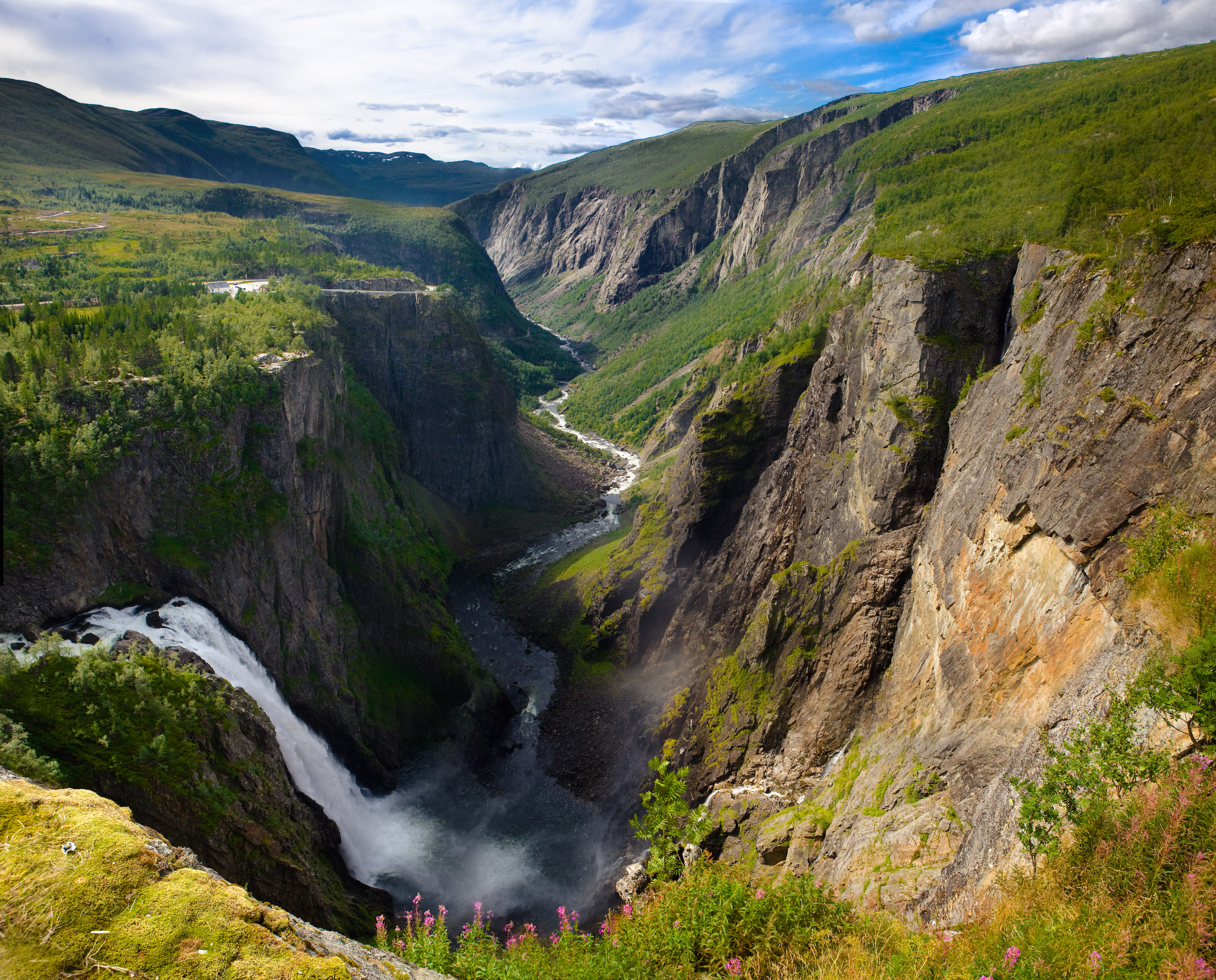
- View of the Måbødalen valley

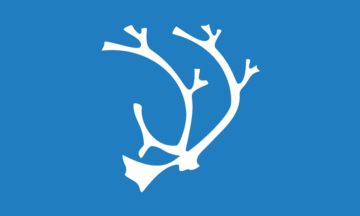
- Flag Coat of arms

- Vestland within Norway

- Eidfjord within Vestland
- Coordinates: 60°26′06″N 07°16′38″E
- Country: Norway
- County: Vestland
- District: Hardanger
- Established: 1 Jan 1891
  - Preceded by: Ulvik Municipality
- Disestablished: 1 Jan 1964
  - Succeeded by: Ullensvang Municipality
- Re-established: 1 Jan 1977
  - Preceded by: Ullensvang Municipality
- Administrative centre: Eidfjord

Government
  - Mayor (2023): Timo Knoch (Ap)

Area
  - Total: 1,498.24 km^{2} (578.47 sq mi)
  - Land: 1,388.49 km^{2} (536.10 sq mi)
  - Water: 109.75 km^{2} (42.37 sq mi) 7.3%
  - Rank: #57 in Norway
- Highest elevation: 1,851.37 m (6,074.0 ft)

Population (2025)
  - Total: 967
  - Rank: #338 in Norway
  - Density: 0.6/km^{2} (1.6/sq mi)
  - Change (10 years): ▲ +1.9%
- Demonym: Eidfjøre

Official language
  - Norwegian form: Nynorsk
- Time zone: UTC+01:00 (CET)
  - Summer (DST): UTC+02:00 (CEST)
- ISO 3166 code: NO-4619
- Website: Official website

Eidfjord is a municipality in Vestland county, Norway. The municipality is located in the traditional district of Hardanger. The administrative centre of the municipality is the village of Eidfjord, where the majority of the municipal population lives. The other major population centre in the municipality is the village of Øvre Eidfjord.

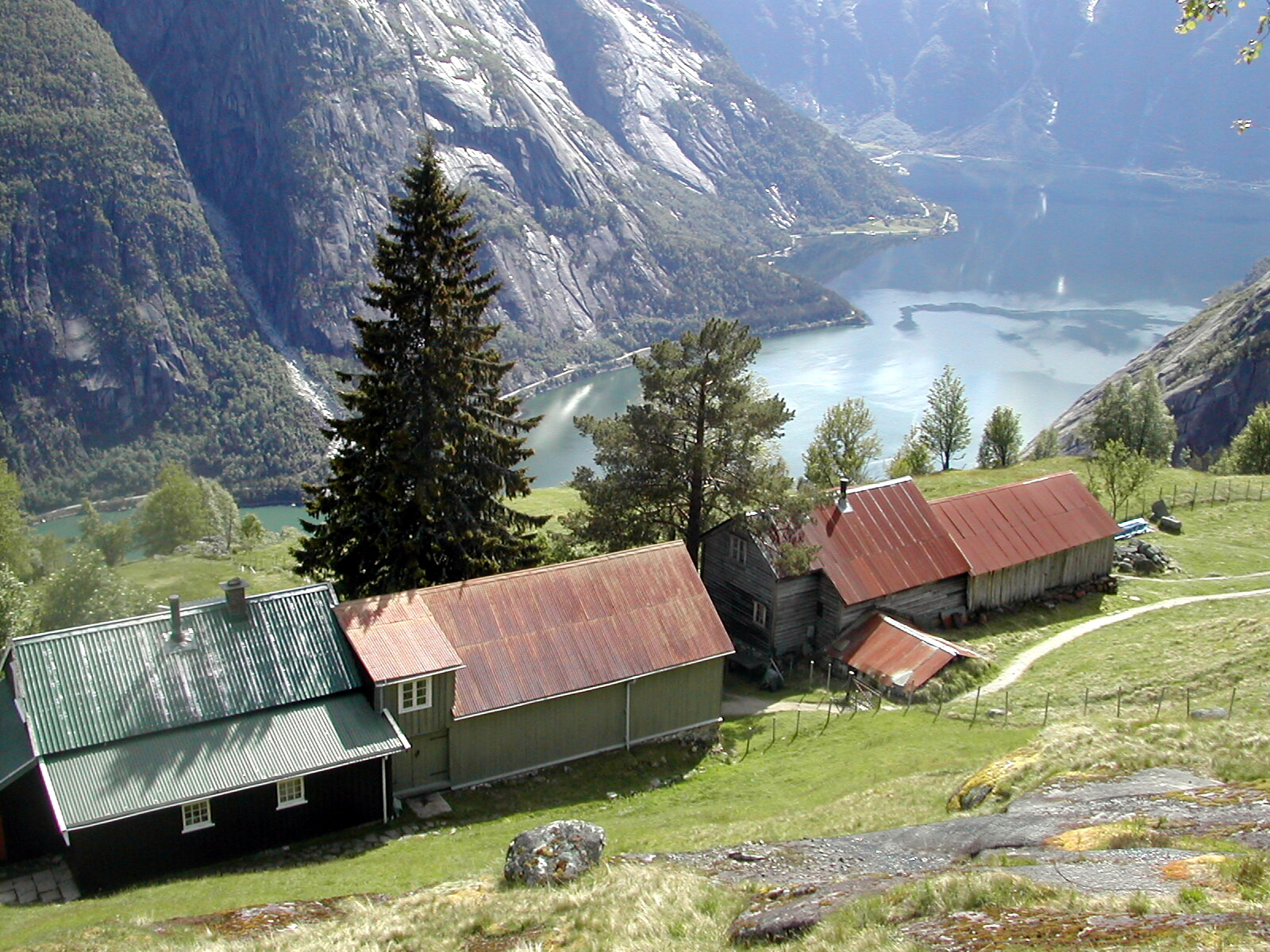
View of the Kjeåsen mountain farm

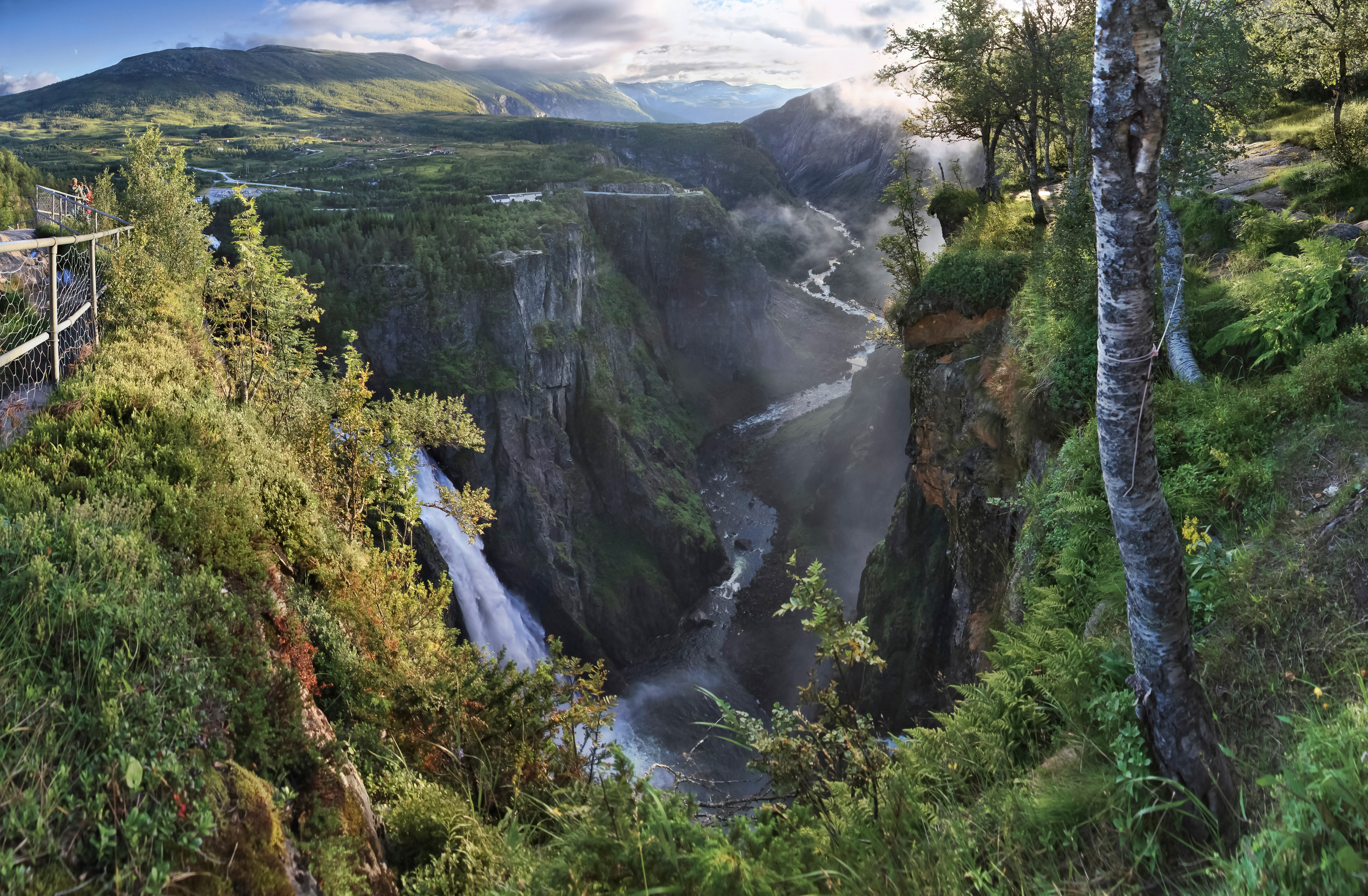
View of Vøringfossen and Måbødalen

Eidfjord is situated at the end of the Eid Fjord, an inner branch of the large Hardangerfjorden. The village of Eidfjord is a major cruise ship port of call and has plans to install a power connection big enough for ships to turn off their engines. Eidfjord has several tourist sites, like the Sima Power Plant which is built into the mountain itself, the Måbødalen valley, and the Vøringsfossen waterfall which has a free fall of 182 metres (597 ft). Large parts of the Hardangervidda (Europe's largest mountain plateau) are located in Eidfjord. The Hardangervidda Natursenter, a visitors centre and museum for Hardangervidda National Park, is located in Øvre Eidfjord.

The 1,498-square-kilometre (578 sq mi) municipality is the 57th largest by area out of the 357 municipalities in Norway. Eidfjord Municipality is the 338th most populous municipality in Norway with a population of 967. The municipality's population density is 0.6 inhabitants per square kilometre (1.6/sq mi) and its population has increased by 1.9% over the previous 10-year period.

== General information ==
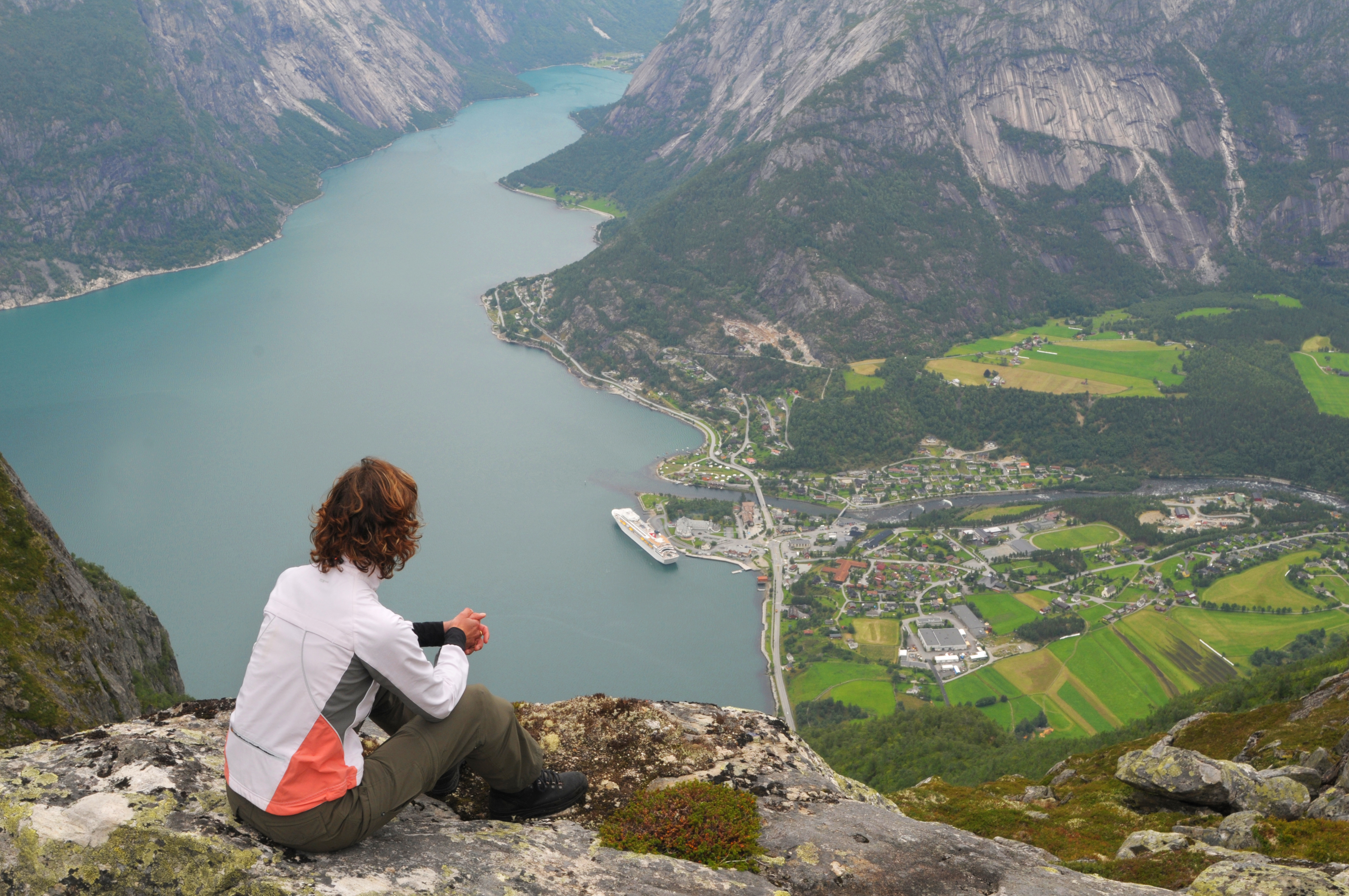
View overlooking the village of Eidfjord

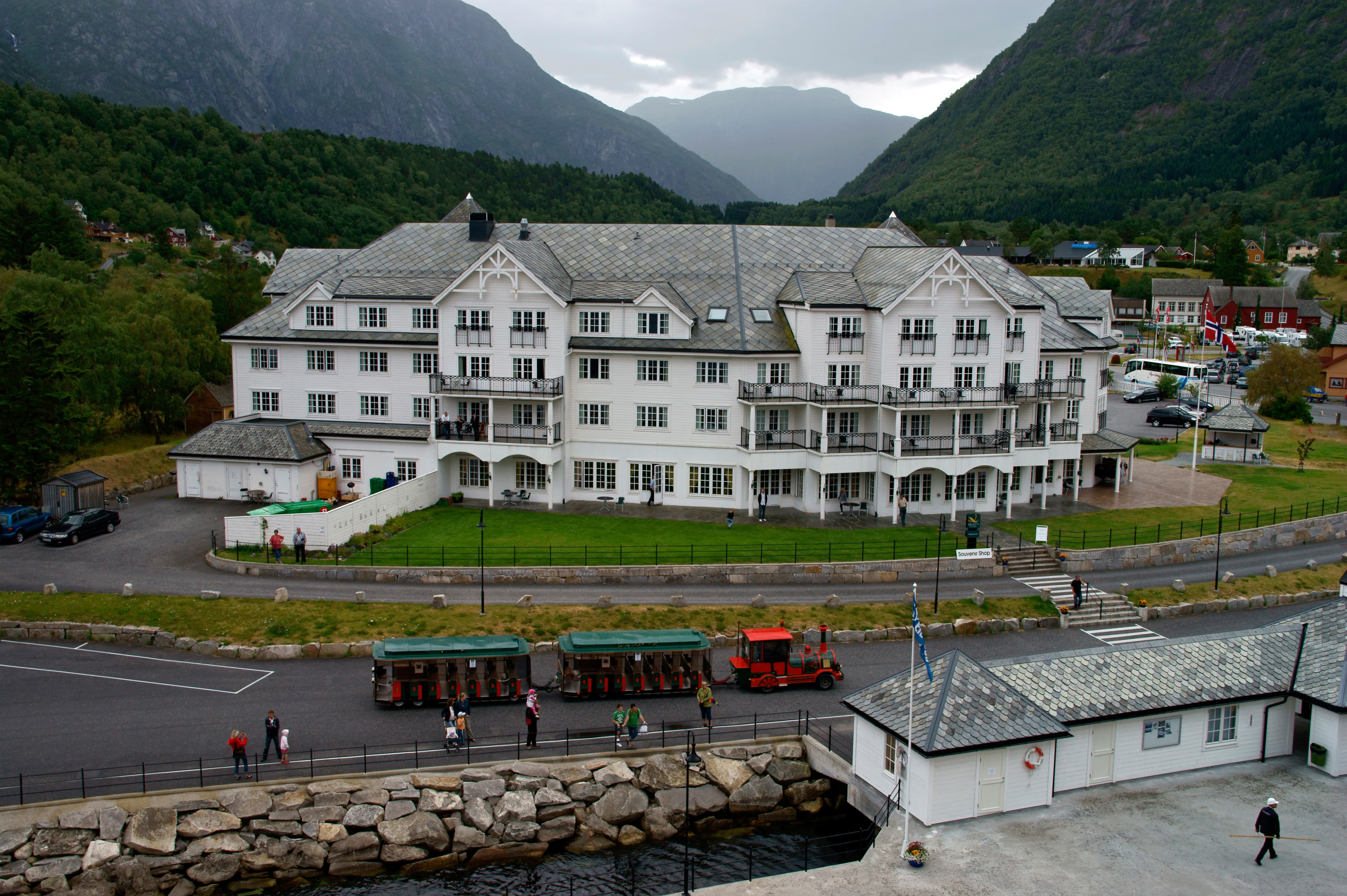
View of a hotel in Eidfjord village

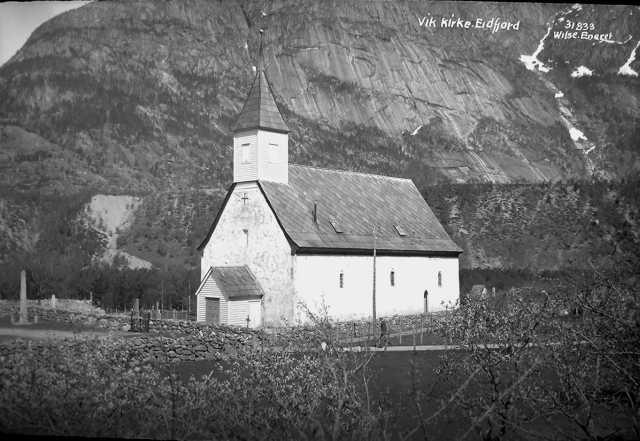
Old Eidfjord Church

The parish of Graven (later spelled "Granvin") was established as a municipality on 1 January 1838 (see formannskapsdistrikt law). This large municipality/parish included two annexes: Ulvik and Eidfjord. On 1 January 1859, Ulvik became the main parish, making Granvin and Eidfjord annexes to Ulvik, and the name of the large municipality was changed from Graven Municipality to Ulvik Municipality.

On 1 May 1891, the large Ulvik Municipality was divided into three separate municipalities as follows:

- the southeastern part became the new Eidfjord Municipality (population: 1,018)
- the western part became Graven Municipality (population: 1,331)
- the remaining areas continued on as a much smaller Ulvik Municipality (population: 1,410)

In 1895, a small part of Eidfjord Municipality (population: 3) was transferred back into Ulvik Municipality.

Eidfjord Municipality existed from 1891 until 1964 when a major municipal merger took place as a result of municipal reform in Norway due to the Schei Committee. On 1 January 1964, the following areas were merged to form a new, larger Ullensvang Municipality:

- all of Eidfjord Municipality (population: 983)
- all of Ullensvang Municipality (population: 2,358)
- most Kinsarvik Municipality (population: 1,513), except for the Lussand/Kvanndal area which became part of Granvin Municipality

This merger was not well-liked by the population of the old Eidfjord Municipality, and so on 1 January 1977, part of the merger was undone, and the area of the "old" Eidfjord Municipality (population: 1,223) was separated to form its own municipality once again.

Historically, this municipality was part of the old Hordaland county. On 1 January 2020, the municipality became a part of the newly-formed Vestland county (after Hordaland and Sogn og Fjordane counties were merged).

On 1 January 2022, the roughly 7-square-kilometre (2.7 sq mi) Ytre Bu area of Ullensvang Municipality (population: 24) was transferred to the neighboring Eidfjord Municipality. The Ytre Bu area is located around the southern end of the Hardanger Bridge.

=== Name ===
The municipality (originally the annex parish) is named after the Eid Fjord (Old Norse: Eiðafjörðr) since the first Eidfjord Church was built there. The first element comes from the old Eid farm (Old Norse: Eiðar). The name of the farm derives from the word eið which means "isthmus", referring to the land between the fjord and the lake Eidfjordvatnet. The last element is fjörðr which means "fjord".

=== Coat of arms ===
The coat of arms was granted on 13 July 1984. The official blazon is "Azure, a reindeer antler argent" (Norwegian: På blå grunn eit kvitt reinsdyrgevir). This means the arms have a blue field (background) and the charge is a reindeer antler. The antler has a tincture of argent which means it is commonly colored white, but if it is made out of metal, then silver is used. The reindeer antler was chosen because the first known settlers of the area were reindeer hunters. The reindeer has been important for the population in the Hardangervidda area for many centuries. The antler also symbolizes the rivers that run from the mountain into the fjord. The arms were designed by John Digernes. The municipal flag has the same design as the coat of arms.

=== Churches ===
The Church of Norway has one parish (sokn) within Eidfjord Municipality. It is part of the Hardanger og Voss prosti (deanery) in the Diocese of Bjørgvin.

Churches in Eidfjord Municipality
Parish (sokn)	Church name	Location of the church	Year built
Eidfjord	Eidfjord Church	Eidfjord	1981
Eidfjord	Old Eidfjord Church	Eidfjord	1309

== Geography ==
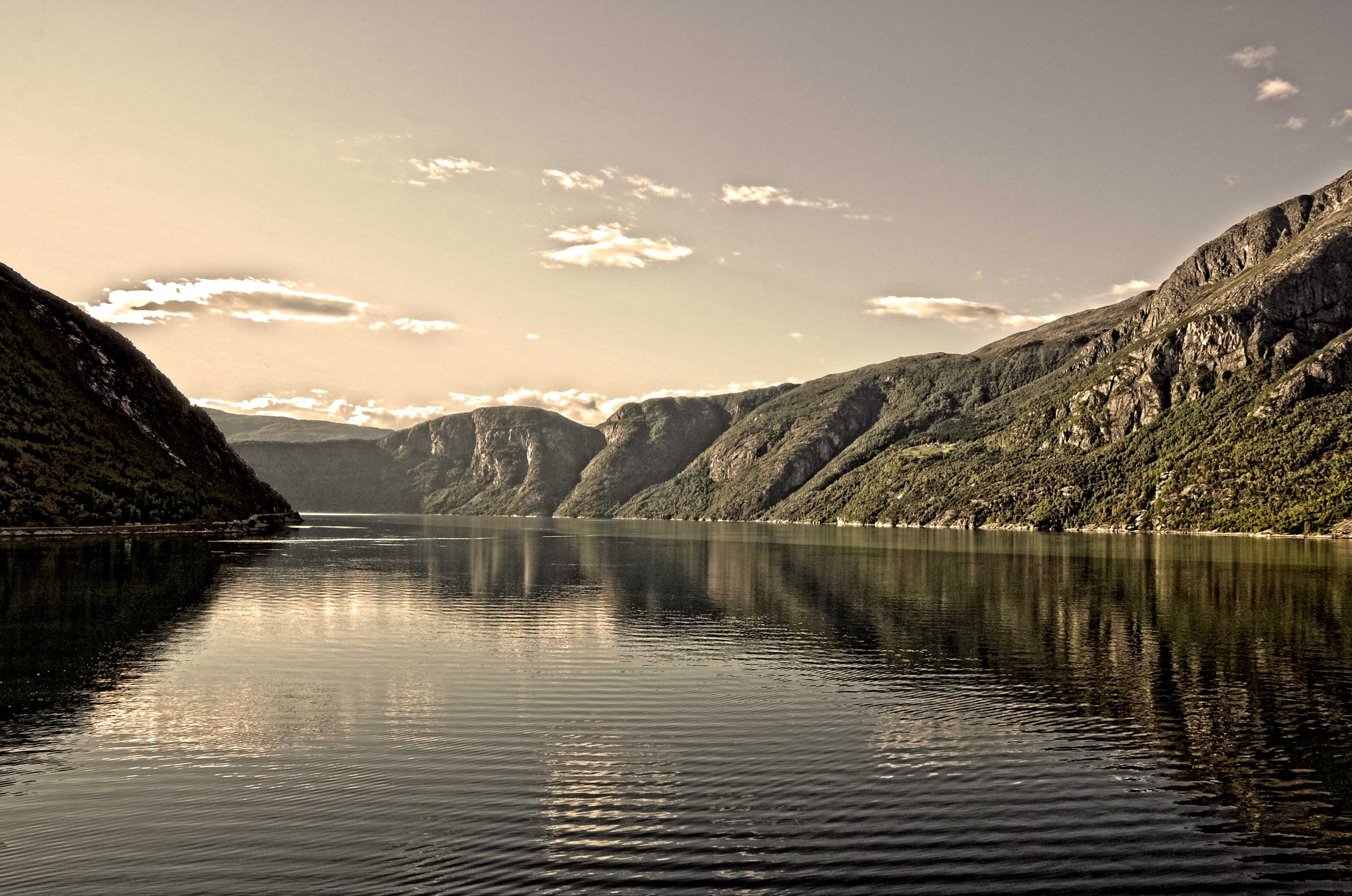
View of the fjords

Eidfjord Municipality sits at the innermost part of the Hardangerfjorden and it stretches inland to include part of the vast Hardangervidda plateau. Part of the Hardangervidda National Park lies in the municipality. Eidfjord Municipality borders Ullensvang Municipality to the southwest, Nore og Uvdal Municipality and Hol Municipality (both in Buskerud county) to the east, and Ulvik Municipality to the north.

Eidfjord Municipality begins at sea level along the fjord, the valleys leading away from the fjord are surrounded by high mountains which lead up to the alpine plateau called Hardangervidda. The highest point in the municipality is the 1,851.37-metre (6,074.0 ft) tall mountain at the top of the Hardangerjøkulen glacier on the border with Ulvik Municipality. The Måbødalen valley is a narrow valley that leads upland to the Vøringfossen waterfall. The Simadalen valley is also located in the municipality, heading inland from the Simadalsfjorden. There are several lakes in Eidfjord Municipality including Eidfjordvatnet, Nordmannslågen, and Sysenvatnet. The lakes Halnefjorden, Skaupsjøen, and Tinnhølen are all partially located in Eidfjord. The rivers Bjoreio, Eio, Sima, and Veig are all located in the municipality.

=== Climate ===
Climate data for Eidfjord - Bu, 1978-2004, 18 m
Month	Jan	Feb	Mar	Apr	May	Jun	Jul	Aug	Sep	Oct	Nov	Dec	Year
Record high °C (°F)	11.0 (51.8)	11.0 (51.8)	13.4 (56.1)	20.2 (68.4)	24.7 (76.5)	29.2 (84.6)	30.7 (87.3)	30.5 (86.9)	22.6 (72.7)	19.8 (67.6)	15.3 (59.5)	13.0 (55.4)	30.7 (87.3)
Daily mean °C (°F)	0.2 (32.4)	−0.2 (31.6)	1.4 (34.5)	5.5 (41.9)	10.0 (50.0)	13.4 (56.1)	15.2 (59.4)	14.8 (58.6)	11.3 (52.3)	6.9 (44.4)	3.5 (38.3)	1.2 (34.2)	6.9 (44.5)
Record low °C (°F)	−17.1 (1.2)	−15.4 (4.3)	−12.4 (9.7)	−4.6 (23.7)	−1.3 (29.7)	1.3 (34.3)	3.7 (38.7)	3.9 (39.0)	−2.1 (28.2)	−5.2 (22.6)	−11.6 (11.1)	−16.4 (2.5)	−17.1 (1.2)
Average precipitation mm (inches)	200 (7.9)	160 (6.3)	155 (6.1)	89 (3.5)	70 (2.8)	72 (2.8)	84 (3.3)	118 (4.6)	143 (5.6)	175 (6.9)	180 (7.1)	248 (9.8)	1,694 (66.7)
Source: yr.no/Norwegian Meteorological Institute

Climate data for Sandhaug, 2008-, 1250 m
Month	Jan	Feb	Mar	Apr	May	Jun	Jul	Aug	Sep	Oct	Nov	Dec	Year
Record high °C (°F)	4.4 (39.9)	6.5 (43.7)	7.6 (45.7)	10.9 (51.6)	18.7 (65.7)	20.0 (68.0)	23.3 (73.9)	20.3 (68.5)	18.6 (65.5)	15.9 (60.6)	7.5 (45.5)	6.0 (42.8)	23.3 (73.9)
Daily mean °C (°F)	−8.8 (16.2)	−9.4 (15.1)	−7.8 (18.0)	−4.2 (24.4)	0.2 (32.4)	4.8 (40.6)	8.8 (47.8)	8.1 (46.6)	4.4 (39.9)	−0.9 (30.4)	−5.0 (23.0)	−8.8 (16.2)	−1.5 (29.2)
Record low °C (°F)	−35.9 (−32.6)	−36.0 (−32.8)	−33.6 (−28.5)	−32.2 (−26.0)	−19.4 (−2.9)	−8.5 (16.7)	−1.7 (28.9)	−1.0 (30.2)	−6.0 (21.2)	−19.0 (−2.2)	−31.9 (−25.4)	−36.5 (−33.7)	−36.5 (−33.7)
Source: yr.no/Norwegian Meteorological Institute

== History ==
The parish of Eidfjord was very special because historically it belonged to the Bishop of Stavanger (and not the Bishop of Bergen as all the other parishes in present-day Vestland county) from 1125 until 1630. The (catholic) Ancient Diocese of Stavanger was created out of the (catholic) Ancient Diocese of Bergen and it included all of present-day Rogaland and Agder counties, plus the districts of Hallingdal in Buskerud county and Valdres in Innlandet county, and the parishes of Røldal and Eidfjord in Vestland county. The reason for including Eidfjord was that the regions of Hallingdal and Valdres belonged to the bishop of Stavanger and the easiest way to reach them from Stavanger was by sailing up the Hardangerfjord to Eidfjord, and then traveling over the Hardangervidda plateau to Hallingdal and Valdres.

== Population ==
Historical population
Year	1891	1900	1910	1920	1930	1946	1951	1960	1970	1980	1990	2000	2010	2020	2023
Pop.	1,018	1,068	1,006	1,010	1,145	1,164	1,126	1,015	*	1,208	1,070	1,037	958	906	962
±% p.a.	—	+0.53%	−0.60%	+0.04%	+1.26%	+0.10%	−0.66%	−1.15%	—	—	−1.21%	−0.31%	−0.79%	−0.56%	+2.02%
Note: *Eidfjord was merged into Ullensvang from 1964-1977. Source: Statistics Norway and Norwegian Historical Data Centre

== Government ==
Eidfjord Municipality is responsible for primary education (through 10th grade), outpatient health services, senior citizen services, welfare and other social services, zoning, economic development, and municipal roads and utilities. The municipality is governed by a municipal council of directly elected representatives. The mayor is indirectly elected by a vote of the municipal council. The municipality is under the jurisdiction of the Hordaland District Court and the Gulating Court of Appeal.

=== Municipal council ===
The municipal council (Kommunestyre) of Eidfjord Municipality is made up of 17 representatives that are elected to four-year terms. The tables below show the current and historical composition of the council by political party.

Eidfjord kommunestyre 2023–2027
Party name (in Nynorsk)	Number of representatives
Labour Party (Arbeidarpartiet)	5
Conservative Party (Høgre)	5
Centre Party (Senterpartiet)	4
Socialist Left Party (Sosialistisk Venstreparti)	3
Total number of members:	17

Eidfjord kommunestyre 2019–2023
Party name (in Nynorsk)	Number of representatives
Labour Party (Arbeidarpartiet)	6
Conservative Party (Høgre)	2
Centre Party (Senterpartiet)	7
Socialist Left Party (Sosialistisk Venstreparti)	2
Total number of members:	17

Eidfjord kommunestyre 2015–2019
Party name (in Nynorsk)	Number of representatives
Labour Party (Arbeidarpartiet)	8
Conservative Party (Høgre)	2
Centre Party (Senterpartiet)	7
Total number of members:	17

Eidfjord kommunestyre 2011–2015
Party name (in Nynorsk)	Number of representatives
Labour Party (Arbeidarpartiet)	5
Conservative Party (Høgre)	3
Centre Party (Senterpartiet)	7
Liberal Party (Venstre)	1
Cross-Party local list (Tverrpolitisk bygdeliste)	1
Total number of members:	17

Eidfjord kommunestyre 2007–2011
Party name (in Nynorsk)	Number of representatives
Labour Party (Arbeidarpartiet)	5
Centre Party (Senterpartiet)	8
Joint list of the Conservative Party and the Eidfjord List (Samlingslista Høgre og Eidfjordlista)	2
Cross-party local list (Tverrpolitisk bygdeliste)	2
Total number of members:	17

Eidfjord kommunestyre 2003–2007
Party name (in Nynorsk)	Number of representatives
Labour Party (Arbeidarpartiet)	5
Conservative Party (Høgre)	2
Centre Party (Senterpartiet)	6
Cross-party local list (Tverrpolitisk bygdeliste)	4
Total number of members:	17

Eidfjord kommunestyre 1999–2003
Party name (in Nynorsk)	Number of representatives
Labour Party (Arbeidarpartiet)	5
Conservative Party (Høgre)	2
Centre Party (Senterpartiet)	4
Socialist Left Party (Sosialistisk Venstreparti)	1
Cross-party local list (Tverrpolitisk bygdeliste)	5
Total number of members:	17

Eidfjord kommunestyre 1995–1999
Party name (in Nynorsk)	Number of representatives
Labour Party (Arbeidarpartiet)	5
Conservative Party (Høgre)	1
Centre Party (Senterpartiet)	8
Local list (Bygdalista)	3
Total number of members:	17

Eidfjord kommunestyre 1991–1995
Party name (in Nynorsk)	Number of representatives
Labour Party (Arbeidarpartiet)	7
Joint list of the Conservative Party (Høgre) and the Centre Party (Senterpartiet)	7
Local list (Bygdalista)	3
Total number of members:	17

Eidfjord kommunestyre 1987–1991
Party name (in Nynorsk)	Number of representatives
Labour Party (Arbeidarpartiet)	8
Joint list of the Conservative Party (Høgre) and the Centre Party (Senterpartiet)	7
Non-political local list (Upolitisk Bygdalista)	3
Total number of members:	17

Eidfjord kommunestyre 1983–1987
Party name (in Nynorsk)	Number of representatives
Labour Party (Arbeidarpartiet)	8
Joint list of the Conservative Party (Høgre) and the Centre Party (Senterpartiet)	8
Non-political local list (Upolitisk Bygdalista)	1
Total number of members:	17

Eidfjord kommunestyre 1979–1983
Party name (in Nynorsk)	Number of representatives
Labour Party (Arbeidarpartiet)	9
Joint list of the Conservative Party (Høgre) and the Centre Party (Senterpartiet)	8
Total number of members:	17

Eidfjord heradsstyre 1959–1963
Party name (in Nynorsk)	Number of representatives
Labour Party (Arbeidarpartiet)	6
Joint List(s) of Non-Socialist Parties (Borgarlege Felleslister)	5
Local List(s) (Lokale lister)	2
Total number of members:	13
Note: On 1 January 1964, Eidfjord Municipality became part of Ullensvang Municipality (until 1977 when the merger was reversed).

Eidfjord heradsstyre 1955–1959
Party name (in Nynorsk)	Number of representatives
Labour Party (Arbeidarpartiet)	6
Joint List(s) of Non-Socialist Parties (Borgarlege Felleslister)	5
Local List(s) (Lokale lister)	2
Total number of members:	13

Eidfjord heradsstyre 1951–1955
Party name (in Nynorsk)	Number of representatives
Labour Party (Arbeidarpartiet)	7
Joint List(s) of Non-Socialist Parties (Borgarlege Felleslister)	5
Total number of members:	12

Eidfjord heradsstyre 1947–1951
Party name (in Nynorsk)	Number of representatives
Labour Party (Arbeidarpartiet)	7
Joint List(s) of Non-Socialist Parties (Borgarlege Felleslister)	4
Local List(s) (Lokale lister)	1
Total number of members:	12

Eidfjord heradsstyre 1945–1947
Party name (in Nynorsk)	Number of representatives
Labour Party (Arbeidarpartiet)	6
Local List(s) (Lokale lister)	6
Total number of members:	12

Eidfjord heradsstyre 1937–1941*
Party name (in Nynorsk)	Number of representatives
Labour Party (Arbeidarpartiet)	5
Joint List(s) of Non-Socialist Parties (Borgarlege Felleslister)	7
Total number of members:	12
Note: Due to the German occupation of Norway during World War II, no elections were held for new municipal councils until after the war ended in 1945.

=== Mayors ===
The mayor (Nynorsk: ordførar) of Eidfjord Municipality is the political leader of the municipality and the chairperson of the municipal council. The following people have held this position:

- 1891–1892: Amund H. Folkedal
- 1893–1895: Thorfinn Skaar
- 1896–1907: Anved A. Tveit
- 1908–1913: Halstein Garathun
- 1914–1916: Anved A. Tveit
- 1917–1919: Halstein Garathun
- 1920–1925: John P. Lægreid
- 1926–1928: Halstein Garathun
- 1929–1934: John P. Lægreid
- 1934–1943: Conrad Hereid
- 1943–1945: Torgils Lægreid
- 1946–1955: Johan Jensen (Ap)
- 1955–1959: Olav A. Myklatun (LL)
- 1959–1963: Thorbjørn T. Lægreid (LL)
- (1964–1977: Eidfjord Municipality was part of Ullensvang Municipality.)
- 1979–1983: Jacob Sæbø (Ap)
- 1983–1987: Samson Instanes (LL)
- 1987–1991: Leiv Anders Vambheim (Ap)
- 1991–1999: Samson Instanes (LL/Sp)
- 1999–2003: Anved Johan Tveit (Sp)
- 2003–2007: Ola B. Hereid (LL)
- 2007–2019: Anved Johan Tveit (Sp)
- 2019–2023: Anders Vatle (Sp)
- 2023–present: Timo Knoch (Ap)

=== Police ===
In 2016, the chief of police for Vestlandet formally suggested a reconfiguration of police districts and stations. He proposed that the police station for Ullensvang and Eidfjord be closed.

== Notable people ==
- Nils Bergslien (1853–1928), an illustrator, painter and sculptor who lived and worked in Eidfjord
- Benedicte Maurseth (born 1983 in Eidfjord), a traditional folk singer and musician

== See also ==
- Fossli Provincial Park, British Columbia, Canada (named after a village in Eidfjord)
