= Norwegian National Road 7 =

Road in Norway

National Road 7
- Bokmål: Riksvei 7 Nynorsk: Riksveg 7

Route information
- Maintained by Norwegian Public Roads Administration
- Length: 387.6 km (240.8 mi)

Major junctions
- West end: Hardanger Bridge, Eidfjord Municipality
- Rv13 – Vossavangen, Odda; Rv52 – Gol; E16 – Hønefoss
- East end: Hønefoss, Ringerike Municipality

Location
- Country: Norway

Highway system
- Roads in Norway; National Roads; County Roads
| ← Rv5 | → Rv9 |

Norwegian National Road 7 (Norwegian: Riksvei 7, Rv7) is a national road in Norway which runs from the town of Hønefoss in Buskerud county to the village of Granvin in Vestland county. The route is 387.6 kilometres (240.8 mi) long and runs east–west through Viken and Vestland counties over the vast Hardangervidda plateau.

The road begins at the European route E16 highway just south of Heradsbygda in Ringerike Municipality and runs through the Sogna river valley to the village of Sokna (this part is called the Soknedalsveien). It then continues further on to Hamremoen and up along the east side of the lake Krøderen to Gulsvik, where it crosses the river and then follows the Hallingdalen valley through Flå, Nesbyen, Gol, Torpo, Ål, Hol, and Geilo (this part is called the Hallingdalsveien). From there, the road begins its path across the Hardangervidda plateau via Ustaoset and Haugastøl, passing the Vøringsfossen waterfall while descending through 4 tunnels (including the 1,893-meter Måbø Tunnel) into the Måbødalen valley in Eidfjord Municipality. The road follows the Eid Fjord for a way before ending at the junction with Norwegian National Road 13 at the entrance to the Hardanger Bridge (opened in 2013, there was a ferry here prior to that time). The portion of the road from Haugestøl to Eidfjord (over the Hardangervidda plateau) is designated a National Tourist Route.

== Improvements ==
In June 2014, a 17-kilometre (11 mi) long stretch of new road was opened in Ringerike-Krødsherad. Compared to the old road, it includes some long tunnels, is less curved, and shortens the journey between Sokna and Ørgenvika. The Hardanger Bridge (opened in 2013) also shortened the travel time, making Road 7 the fastest option for travelling Oslo–Bergen by road.

There are also some unofficial proposals to build a 15-kilometre (9.3 mi) long tunnel under the Hardangervidda plateau, because this stretch is often closed due to snow storms in the winter.
