= Granvin Municipality =

Former municipality in Hordaland, Norway

Granvin Municipality Granvin herad
- Former municipality
- Graven herred (historic name)
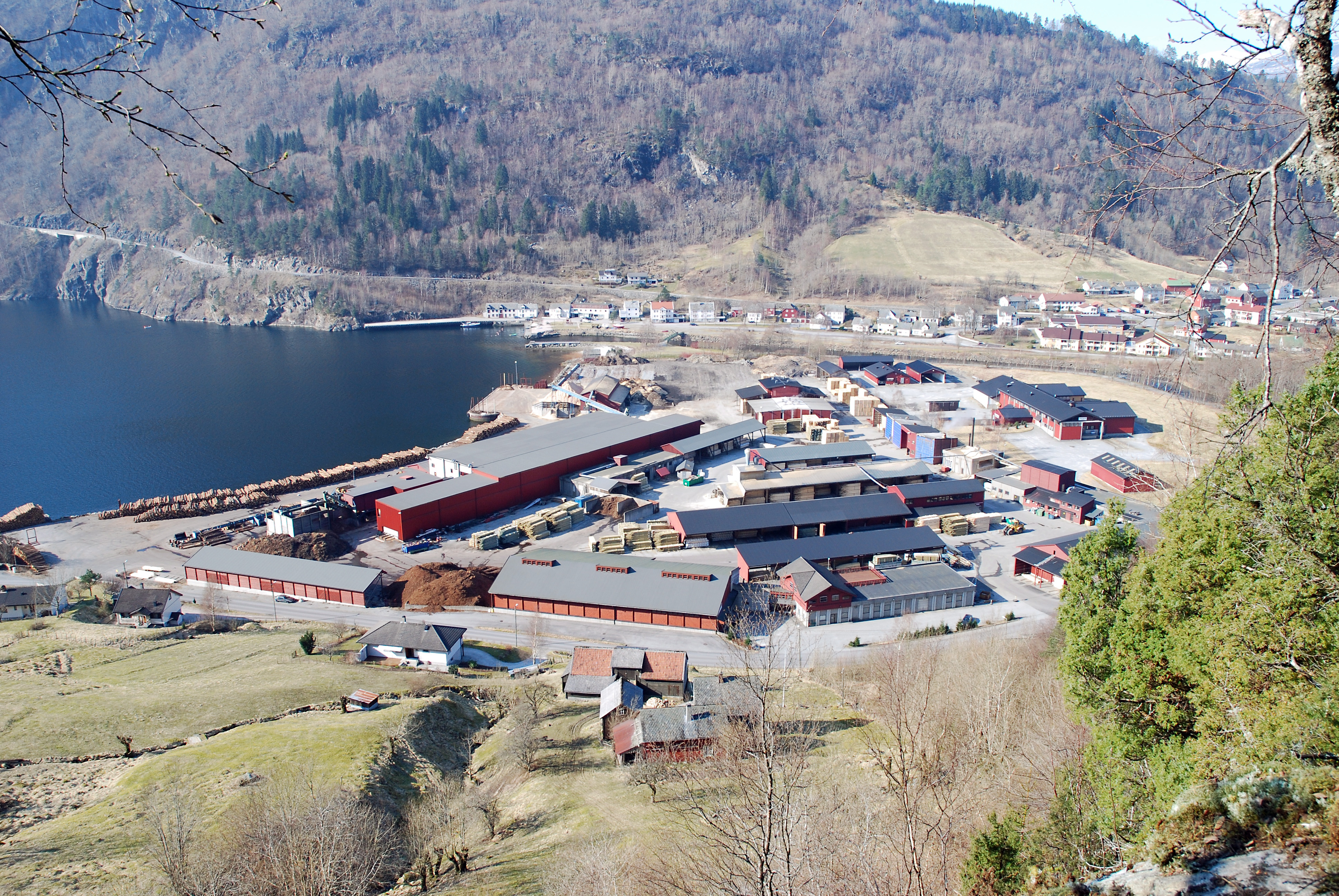
- View of the village of Granvin

- Flag Coat of arms

- Hordaland within Norway

- Granvin within Hordaland
- Coordinates: 60°31′37″N 06°43′10″E
- Country: Norway
- County: Hordaland
- District: Hardanger
- Established: 1 May 1891
  - Preceded by: Ulvik Municipality
- Disestablished: 1 Jan 2020
  - Succeeded by: Voss Municipality
- Administrative centre: Eide

Government
  - Mayor (2011-2019): Ingebjørg Winjum (V)

Area (upon dissolution)
  - Total: 211.29 km^{2} (81.58 sq mi)
  - Land: 203.87 km^{2} (78.71 sq mi)
  - Water: 7.42 km^{2} (2.86 sq mi) 3.5%
  - Rank: #326 in Norway
- Highest elevation: 1,576.1 m (5,171 ft)

Population (2019)
  - Total: 937
  - Rank: #402 in Norway
  - Density: 4.4/km^{2} (11/sq mi)
  - Change (10 years): ▼ −1.4%
- Demonym: Gravensar

Official language
  - Norwegian form: Nynorsk
- Time zone: UTC+01:00 (CET)
  - Summer (DST): UTC+02:00 (CEST)
- ISO 3166 code: NO-1234

Granvin is a former municipality in the old Hordaland county, Norway. The 211.29-square-kilometre (81.58 sq mi) municipality existed from 1891 until its dissolution in 2020. The area is now part of Voss Municipality in the traditional district of Hardanger in Vestland county. The administrative centre was the village of Eide, which was also known as "Granvin". About half of the residents of the municipality lived in the municipal centre. The rest lived in the rural valley areas surrounding the Granvin Fjord or the lake Granvinsvatnet in the central part of the municipality.

Prior to its dissolution in 2020, the 211.29-square-kilometre (81.58 sq mi) municipality was the 326th largest by area out of the 422 municipalities in Norway. Granvin Municipality was the 402nd most populous municipality in Norway with a population of about 937. The municipality's population density was 4.4 inhabitants per square kilometre (11/sq mi) and its population had decreased by 1.4% over the previous 10-year period.

== General information ==
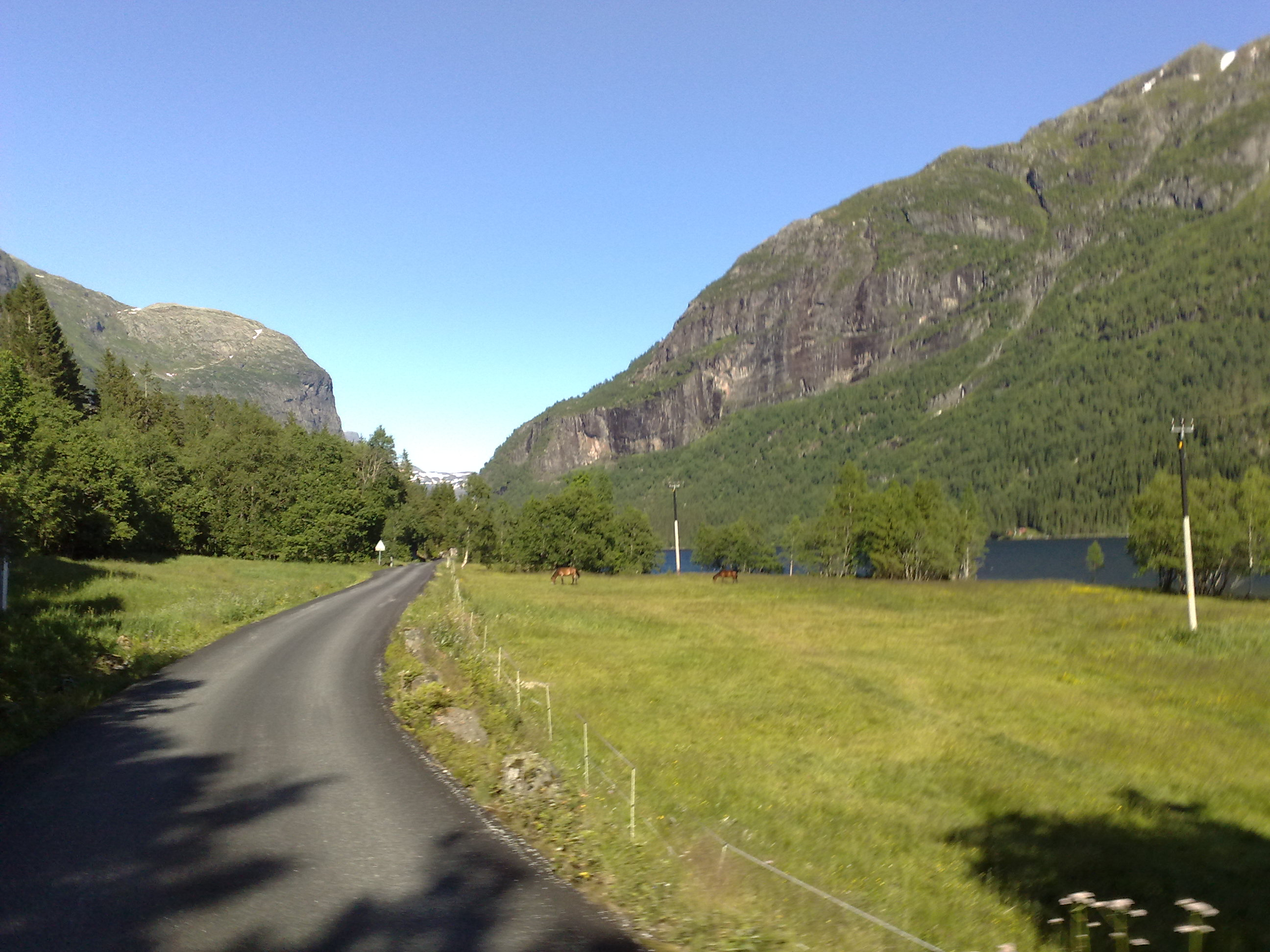
View of a small road in Granvin

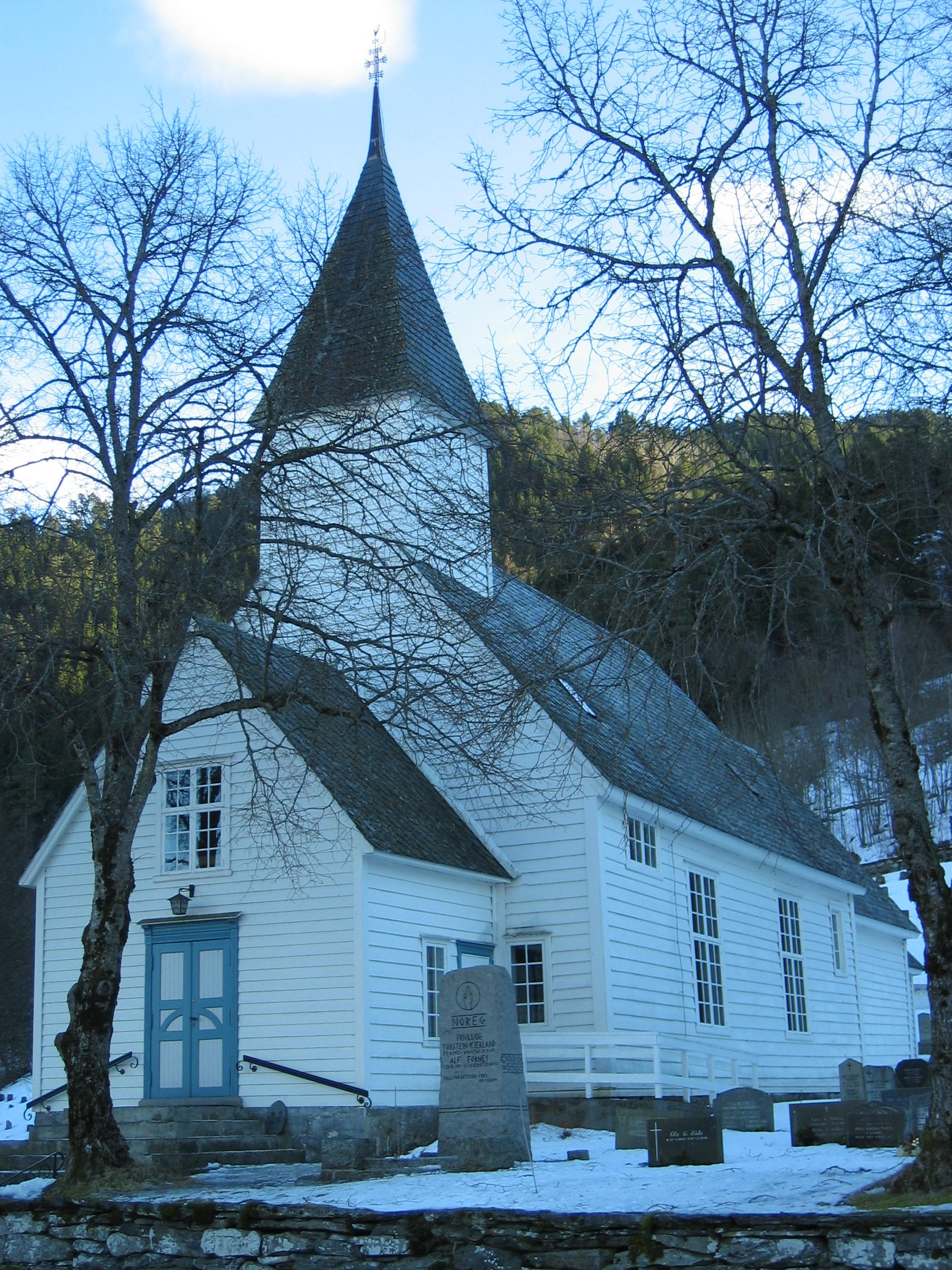
Granvin Church

Granvin Municipality was established on 1 May 1891, however, there was a different municipality before that time with the same name. The parish of Graven was established as a municipality on 1 January 1838 (see formannskapsdistrikt law). This new Graven Municipality was very large and it included two annexes to the main parish: Ulvik and Eidfjord. On 1 January 1859, the parish was re-aligned and the Ulvik Church became the main parish church, so that Graven (later spelled "Granvin") and Eidfjord became annexes to Ulvik. At the same time, the name of the large municipality was changed to Ulvik Municipality.

On 1 May 1891, the large Ulvik Municipality was divided into three parts by creating two new municipalities. The western annex (population: 1,331) became the new Granvin Municipality and the southeastern annex (population: 1,018) became the new Eidfjord Municipality.

During the 1960s, there were many municipal mergers across Norway due to the work of the Schei Committee. On 1 January 1964, the neighboring Kinsarvik Municipality was dissolved and its lands were transferred to other municipalities. On that date, the Lussand-Kvanndal area of the old Kinsarvik Municipality (population: 72) was transferred into Granvin Municipality.

On 1 January 2020, Granvin Municipality and Voss Municipality were merged into a new, large Voss Municipality. Historically, Gravin Municipality was part of the old Hordaland county. On the same date the new Voss Municipality became a part of the newly-formed Vestland county (after Hordaland and Sogn og Fjordane counties were merged).

=== Name ===
The municipality (originally the parish) is named after the old Granvin farm (Old Norse: Grǫnvin) since the first Granvin Church was built there. The first element is grǫn which means "spruce". The last element is vin which means "meadow" or "pasture". The area is one of the few places in Western Norway that has spruce forests.

The name of the old Church of Norway parish was spelled as "Graven" before 1858. It was then spelled as "Granvin" from 1858 until 1891. When it became a separate municipality in 1891, the old spelling of "Graven" was used again (briefly). On 1 April 1898, a royal resolution changed the spelling of the name of the municipality to Granvin.

Granvin Municipality (Norwegian: Granvin herad) was one of the few municipalities in Norway that used the word herad instead of kommune in its name. Both Norwegian words can be translated to be "municipality", but herad is an older word that historically was only used for rural municipalities. Municipalities can choose to use one or the other, but most use the more modern kommune. From 1838 until the mid-20th century, most municipalities used herad or herred (using the Nynorsk or Bokmål spelling) for their name, but after some changes in the law on municipalities in the 1950s and onwards, most municipalities switched to kommune. All of the municipalities that use herad are located in the Hardanger region of Western Norway.

=== Coat of arms ===
The coat of arms was granted on 13 May 1988 and it was in use until 1 January 2020 when the municipality was dissolved. The official blazon is "Vert, a fiddle Or in bend sinister" (Norwegian: På grøn grunn ei gul fele, skråstilt venstre-høgre). This means the arms have a green field (background) and the charge is a diagonal hardanger fiddle (Hardingfele), a type of Norwegian folk instrument. The fiddle has a tincture of Or which means it is commonly colored yellow, but if it is made out of metal, then gold is used. The design was chosen to symbolize the rich folk-music traditions in the Hardanger region and it also symbolizes an active and creative community. The fiddle is a simplified representation of the richly decorated Hardanger fiddles. This fiddle, used to play folk dance music, has two sets or layers of four strings and has a very characteristic sound. The lower set of sympathetic strings is not directly touched by the fiddler, but they vibrate when the other strings are played. The arms were designed by Øyvind Kvamme. The municipal flag has the same design as the coat of arms.

=== Churches ===
The Church of Norway had one parish (sokn) within Granvin Municipality. It is part of the Hardanger og Voss prosti (deanery) in the Diocese of Bjørgvin.

Churches in Granvin Municipality
Parish (sokn)	Church name	Location of the church	Year built
Granvin	Granvin Church	Granvin	1726

== Geography ==
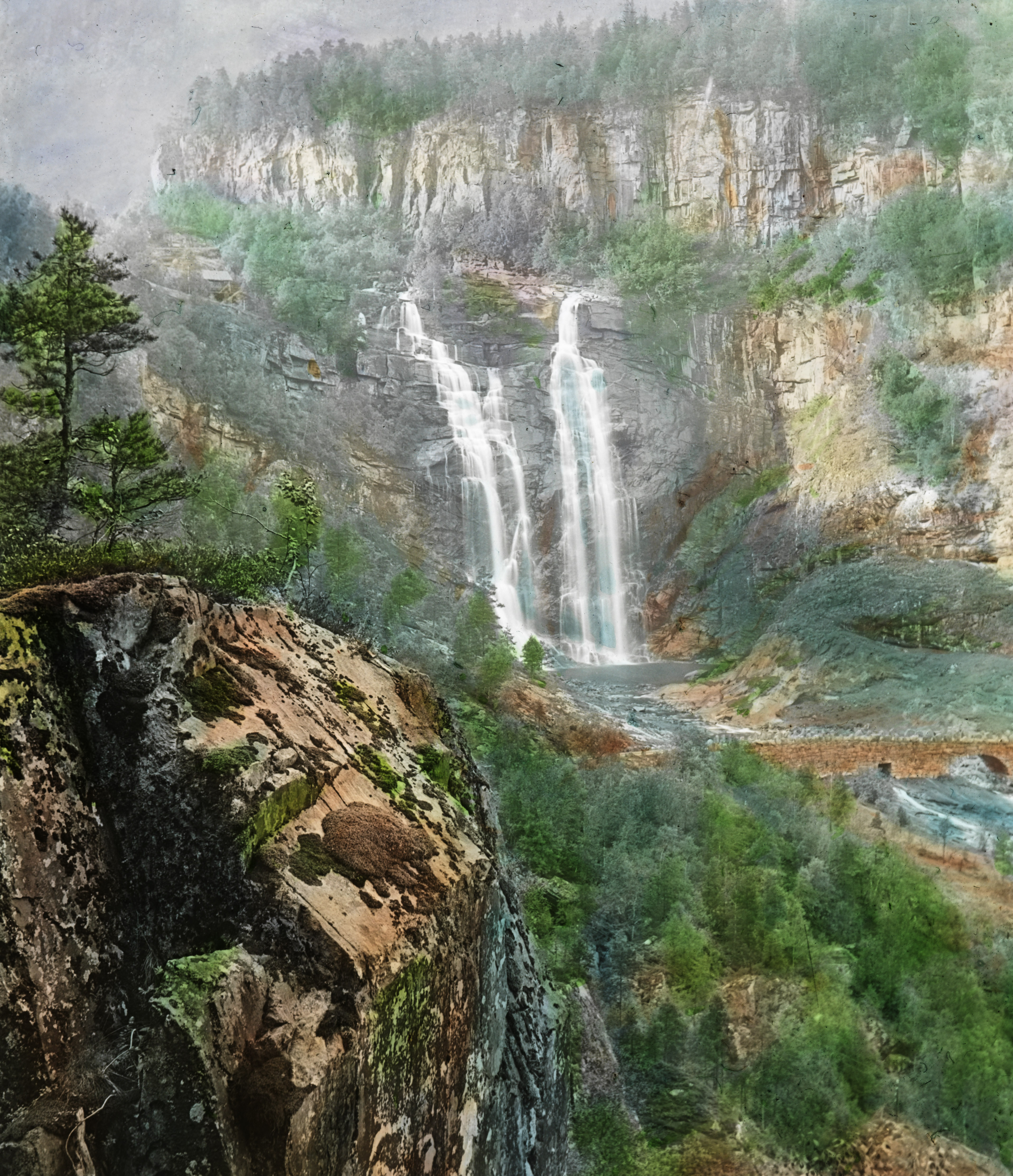
View of the Skjervefossen

The municipality was situated along both sides of the Granvin Fjord (a small arm off of the main Hardangerfjorden) and the valley extending inland from the end of the fjord, in the region of Hardanger. The large lake Granvinsvatnet was located right in the center of the valley, just north of the village of Eide. On both sides of the fjord and valley, there were high mountains. Espeland Falls was located in the Espelandsdalen valley near the border with Ulvik Municipality. The Skjervefossen waterfall was also located in Granvin. The highest point in the municipality was the 1,576.1-metre (5,171 ft) tall mountain Olsskavlen which was located along the border with Voss Municipality.

Voss Municipality was located to the north and west; Kvam Municipality was located to the southwest, Ullensvang Municipality was located to the south, and Ulvik Municipality was located to the east.

== Transportation ==
Norwegian National Road 13 entered Granvin via the Tunsberg Tunnel which ran through the high mountains to the northwest. The highway then ran through Granvin before entering the Vallavik Tunnel which goes through the high mountains to the southeast. The Vallavik Tunnel connects up with the Hardanger Bridge in Ulvik Municipality which crosses the Hardangerfjorden. A car ferry service connected Kvanndal (in southwest Granvin) with the villages of Utne and Kinsarvik (in Ullensvang Municipality) on the south side of the Hardangerfjord. From 1935 to 1988, Hardanger railway line ran between Granvin and Vossavangen. The line was closed in 1988 and the rails were later removed.

== History ==
In April 1940, during the German invasion of Norway during World War II, there was some fighting between German and Norwegian forces in Granvin. German forces landed in the village of Granvin on 25 April as part of their pincer movement towards the Norwegian military camps at Vossavangen. There was fighting at Skjervefossen for most of that day, until the Norwegian forces retreated late at night to avoid encirclement. Four Norwegian soldiers and at least 30 German soldiers fell in the fighting.

== Population ==
Historical population

Year	Pop.	±% p.a.
1891	1,331	—
1900	1,276	−0.47%
1910	1,213	−0.51%
1920	1,070	−1.25%
1930	1,159	+0.80%

Year	Pop.	±% p.a.
1946	1,190	+0.17%
1951	1,158	−0.54%
1960	1,102	−0.55%
1970	1,039	−0.59%
1980	996	−0.42%

Year	Pop.	±% p.a.
1990	1,036	+0.39%
2000	1,044	+0.08%
2010	947	−0.97%
2019	937	−0.12%

Source: Statistics Norway and Norwegian Historical Data Centre

Upon the dissolution of the municipality, the population of Granvin had been dropping since World War II. In 1951, the population was 1,158. Since then, it has dropped by 21.3% to 911 in 2014. This situation is common in many smaller, rural municipalities in Norway.

== Government ==
While it existed, Granvin Municipality was responsible for primary education (through 10th grade), outpatient health services, senior citizen services, welfare and other social services, zoning, economic development, and municipal roads and utilities. The municipality was governed by a municipal council of directly elected representatives. The mayor was indirectly elected by a vote of the municipal council. The municipality was under the jurisdiction of the Hardanger District Court and the Gulating Court of Appeal.

=== Municipal council ===
The municipal council (Heradsstyre) of Granvin Municipality was made up of representatives that were elected to four year terms. The tables below show the historical composition of the council by political party.

Granvin heradsstyre 2015–2019
Party name (in Nynorsk)	Number of representatives
Labour Party (Arbeidarpartiet)	2
Conservative Party (Høgre)	2
Centre Party (Senterpartiet)	5
Socialist Left Party (Sosialistisk Venstreparti)	1
Liberal Party (Venstre)	3
Total number of members:	13
Note: On 1 January 2020, Granvin Municipality became part of Voss Municipality.

Granvin heradsstyre 2011–2015
Party name (in Nynorsk)	Number of representatives
Conservative Party (Høgre)	3
Centre Party (Senterpartiet)	4
Socialist Left Party (Sosialistisk Venstreparti)	1
Liberal Party (Venstre)	5
Total number of members:	13

Granvin heradsstyre 2007–2011
Party name (in Nynorsk)	Number of representatives
Labour Party (Arbeidarpartiet)	6
Conservative Party (Høgre)	2
Centre Party (Senterpartiet)	4
Liberal Party (Venstre)	1
Total number of members:	13

Granvin heradsstyre 2003–2007
Party name (in Nynorsk)	Number of representatives
Labour Party (Arbeidarpartiet)	3
Conservative Party (Høgre)	1
Centre Party (Senterpartiet)	5
Socialist Left Party (Sosialistisk Venstreparti)	2
Liberal Party (Venstre)	2
Total number of members:	13

Granvin heradsstyre 1999–2003
Party name (in Nynorsk)	Number of representatives
Labour Party (Arbeidarpartiet)	2
Conservative Party (Høgre)	2
Centre Party (Senterpartiet)	6
Socialist Left Party (Sosialistisk Venstreparti)	1
Liberal Party (Venstre)	2
Total number of members:	13

Granvin heradsstyre 1995–1999
Party name (in Nynorsk)	Number of representatives
Labour Party (Arbeidarpartiet)	2
Conservative Party (Høgre)	2
Centre Party (Senterpartiet)	6
Socialist Left Party (Sosialistisk Venstreparti)	1
Liberal Party (Venstre)	2
Total number of members:	13

Granvin heradsstyre 1991–1995
Party name (in Nynorsk)	Number of representatives
Labour Party (Arbeidarpartiet)	2
Conservative Party (Høgre)	2
Centre Party (Senterpartiet)	6
Socialist Left Party (Sosialistisk Venstreparti)	1
Liberal Party (Venstre)	2
Total number of members:	13

Granvin heradsstyre 1987–1991
Party name (in Nynorsk)	Number of representatives
Labour Party (Arbeidarpartiet)	3
Conservative Party (Høgre)	2
Centre Party (Senterpartiet)	6
Liberal Party (Venstre)	2
Total number of members:	13

Granvin heradsstyre 1983–1987
Party name (in Nynorsk)	Number of representatives
Labour Party (Arbeidarpartiet)	3
Conservative Party (Høgre)	2
Centre Party (Senterpartiet)	6
Joint list of the Liberal Party (Venstre) and Christian Democratic Party (Kristelig Folkeparti)	2
Total number of members:	13

Granvin heradsstyre 1979–1983
Party name (in Nynorsk)	Number of representatives
Labour Party (Arbeidarpartiet)	3
Conservative Party (Høgre)	2
Centre Party (Senterpartiet)	7
Joint list of the Liberal Party (Venstre) and Christian Democratic Party (Kristelig Folkeparti)	1
Total number of members:	13

Granvin heradsstyre 1975–1979
Party name (in Nynorsk)	Number of representatives
Labour Party (Arbeidarpartiet)	4
Centre Party (Senterpartiet)	7
Local list for Granvin (Bygdelista for Granvin)	2
Total number of members:	13

Granvin heradsstyre 1971–1975
Party name (in Nynorsk)	Number of representatives
Labour Party (Arbeidarpartiet)	4
Centre Party (Senterpartiet)	7
Local List(s) (Lokale lister)	2
Total number of members:	13

Granvin heradsstyre 1967–1971
Party name (in Nynorsk)	Number of representatives
Labour Party (Arbeidarpartiet)	4
Centre Party (Senterpartiet)	6
Liberal Party (Venstre)	3
Total number of members:	13

Granvin heradsstyre 1963–1967
Party name (in Nynorsk)	Number of representatives
Labour Party (Arbeidarpartiet)	3
Centre Party (Senterpartiet)	7
Liberal Party (Venstre)	3
Total number of members:	13

Granvin heradsstyre 1959–1963
Party name (in Nynorsk)	Number of representatives
Labour Party (Arbeidarpartiet)	3
Centre Party (Senterpartiet)	7
Liberal Party (Venstre)	3
Total number of members:	13

Granvin heradsstyre 1955–1959
Party name (in Nynorsk)	Number of representatives
Labour Party (Arbeidarpartiet)	3
Farmers' Party (Bondepartiet)	8
Liberal Party (Venstre)	1
Joint List(s) of Non-Socialist Parties (Borgarlege Felleslister)	1
Total number of members:	13

Granvin heradsstyre 1951–1955
Party name (in Nynorsk)	Number of representatives
Labour Party (Arbeidarpartiet)	3
Joint List(s) of Non-Socialist Parties (Borgarlege Felleslister)	9
Total number of members:	12

Granvin heradsstyre 1947–1951
Party name (in Nynorsk)	Number of representatives
Local List(s) (Lokale lister)	12
Total number of members:	12

Granvin heradsstyre 1945–1947
Party name (in Nynorsk)	Number of representatives
Local List(s) (Lokale lister)	12
Total number of members:	12

Granvin heradsstyre 1937–1941*
Party name (in Nynorsk)	Number of representatives
Labour Party (Arbeidarpartiet)	1
Joint List(s) of Non-Socialist Parties (Borgarlege Felleslister)	11
Total number of members:	12
Note: Due to the German occupation of Norway during World War II, no elections were held for new municipal councils until after the war ended in 1945.

=== Mayors ===
The mayor (Nynorsk: ordførar) of Granvin Municipality was the political leader of the municipality and the chairperson of the municipal council. The following people have held this position:

- 1891–1892: Hans Larsen Saakvitne (V)
- 1893–1904: Ole S. Medaas
- 1905–1913: Jens Lillegraven
- 1914–1922: Eirik R. Eide
- 1923–1925: Olav J. Nestaas
- 1925–1931: Eirik R. Eide
- 1932–1941: Olav J. Nestaas
- 1941–1945: Anders Røynstrand (NS)
- 1945–1947: Olav J. Nestaas
- 1947–1959: Karl Teigland (Bp)
- 1959–1967: Lars Prestegard (Sp)
- 1967–1971: Torbjørn Seim (Sp)
- 1971–1975: Ingebjørg Prestegard (Sp)
- 1975–1979: Torbjørn Seim (Sp)
- 1979–1991: Magnar Lussand (Sp)
- 1991–2007: Olav T. Seim (Sp)
- 2007–2011: Jan Ivar Rødland (Ap)
- 2011–2019: Ingebjørg Winjum (V)

== Notable people ==
- Lars Jonson Haukaness (1863–1929), an impressionist painter
- Hans Dahl (1849–1937), an artist specializing in landscape paintings
- Olav Medaas (1926–2019), a three-time champion in Norwegian national shooting competition, also a military world champion

== In popular culture ==
Granvin is a major setting in Moe Cidaly's short story "Summer Episode".

== See also ==
- List of former municipalities of Norway
