= Norwegian County Road 7 =

Road in Norway

County Road 7

Route information
- Length: 107.92 km (67.06 mi)

Major junctions
- West end: E16 at Trengereid
- Fv137 at Hisdal; Fv136 at Bjørkheim; Fv136 at Steinsland/Haga; Fv48 at Lake Frøland; Fv134 at Frøland; Fv133 at Myrkhøl; Fv128 at Steinsdal; Fv49 at Norheimsund; Fv130 at Norheimsund; Fv130 at Øystese; Fv131 at Nygård; Fv132 at Steinstø
- East end: Rv13 at Kollanes

Location
- Country: Norway
- Counties: Vestland

Highway system
- Roads in Norway; National Roads; County Roads

County Road 7 (Norwegian: Fylkesvei 7) was a 92.24-kilometer (57.32 mi) road in Vestland county, Norway. The road ran from Trengereid in Bergen Municipality to Kollanes in Voss Municipality. In 2019, the road was renumbered with the portion west of Norheimsund becoming an extension of Norwegian County Road 49 and the eastern portion from Norheimsund to Granvin becoming Norwegian County Road 79.

The route branches off from European route E16 and passes through the Trengereid Valley to Samnanger Municipality before crossing mountainous territory east to the village of Norheimsund. It then continues along the north side of the Hardanger Fjord through the villages of Øystese and Ålvik and the north side of the Granvin Fjord before meeting Norwegian National Road 13 in Voss Municipality.

== History ==
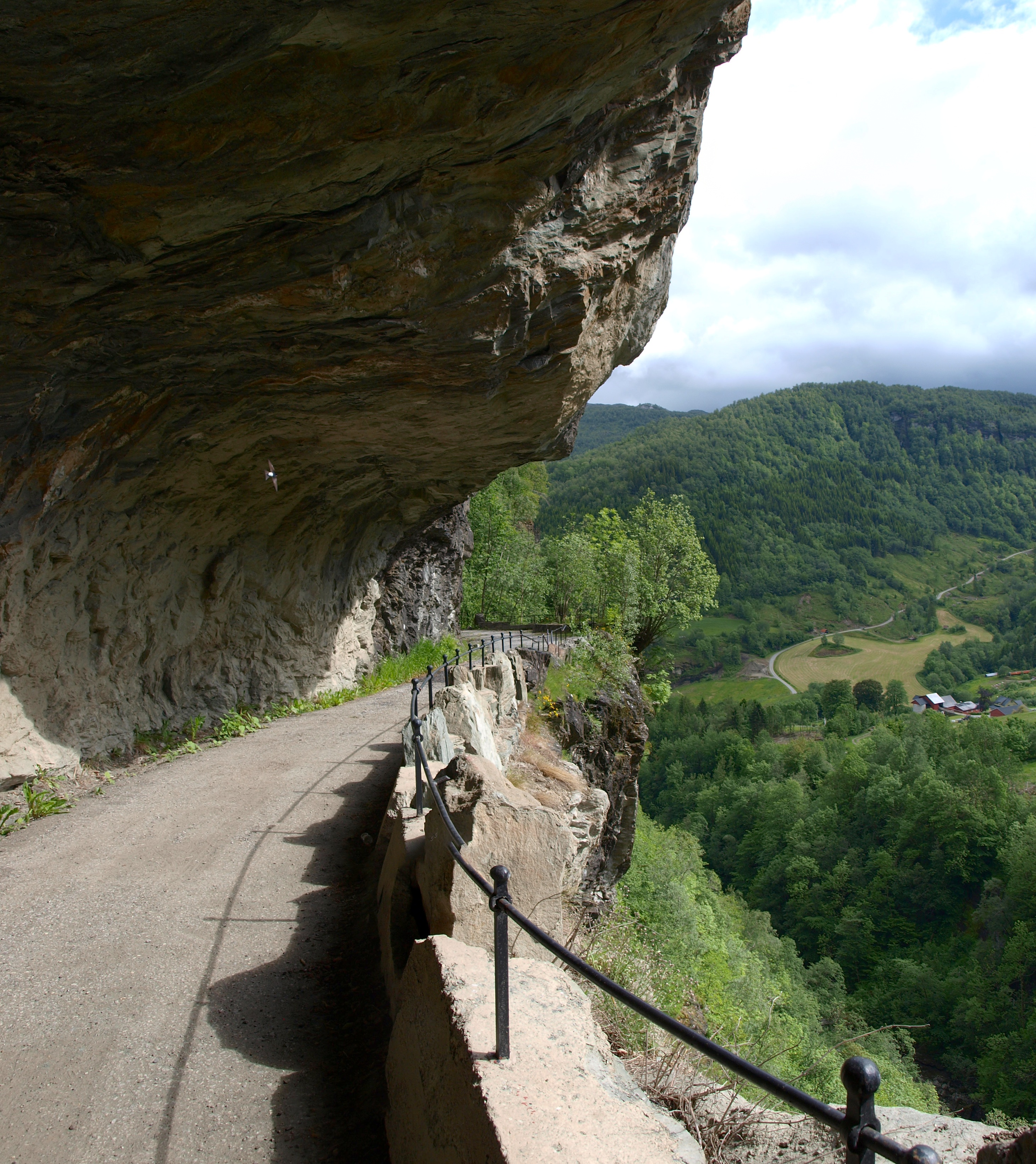
The old road through the Toka Gorge

The section of the road through the Toka Gorge was laid out around 1890; construction began on it in 1903 and it was opened in 1907. Large parts of the road were carved out by hand while the workers hung on ropes against the sheer mountainside. This method was used because the road lacks any natural foundation. A new route with four tunnels was opened in the 1960s. These are the Snauhaugen Tunnel (349 meters or 1,145 feet), Hansagjel Tunnel (697 meters or 2,287 feet), Tokagjel Tunnel (408 meters or 1,339 feet), and Fossagjel Tunnel (365 meters or 1,198 feet). On December 21, 2009 the Norwegian Directorate for Cultural Heritage protected the road through the Toka Gorge along with 39 other routes as part of the National Protection Plan for Roads, Bridges, and Road-Related Cultural Heritage.

Before January 1, 2010 the route was part of Norwegian National Road 7. Before 1992 the route from Bergen to Granvin via Nesttun was part of the former European route E68.

In 2015, the section of the route between Folkedal and Haukanes in the Granvin Fjord, which was exposed to landslides, was improved with a new 2.3-kilometer (1.4 mi) section including the 1,370-meter (4,490 ft) Folkedal Tunnel. The construction cost NOK 274 million.

== National Tourist Route ==
The section of the road between Steinsdal Falls in Kvam Municipality and Granvin in Voss Municipality has been designated as the Hardanger National Tourist Route together with the road section from Jondal to Utne on County Road 550 and the section from Låte Falls to Kinsarvik along National Road 13.
