= Norwegian County Road 550 =

Road in Norway

County Road 550

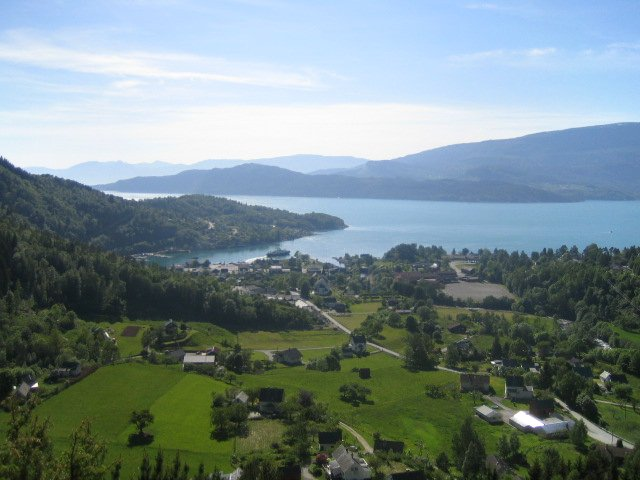
- County Road 550 in Jondal

Route information
- Length: 81.96 km (50.93 mi)

Major junctions
- West end: Fv5098 at Jondal
- Fv5104 at Nå; Fv551 at Eitrheim
- East end: Rv13 at Odda

Location
- Country: Norway
- Counties: Vestland

Highway system
- Roads in Norway; National Roads; County Roads

County Road 550 (Norwegian: Fylkesvei 550) is an 81.96-kilometer (50.93 mi) county road in Ullensvang Municipality in Vestland county, Norway. The road runs from the village of Jondal to the town of Odda.

The route branches off from Norwegian County Road 5098 and follows the coast of the Folgefonna Peninsula. It runs north along the southeast side of the Hardanger Fjord to Utne and then turns south, running along the west side of the South Fjord to the town of Odda before meeting Norwegian National Road 13.

== History ==
Before January 1, 2010, the route was a Norwegian national road. It was redesignated a county road after the regional reform of national roads.

== National Tourist Route ==
The section of the road between Utne and Jondal has been designated as the Hardanger National Tourist Route together with the road from Steinsdal Falls in Kvam Municipality to Granvin on County Road 7 and the section from Låte Falls to Kinsarvik along National Road 13. The protected part of County Road 550 was built between 1874 and 1965.
