= Granvinsvatnet =

Lake in Norway

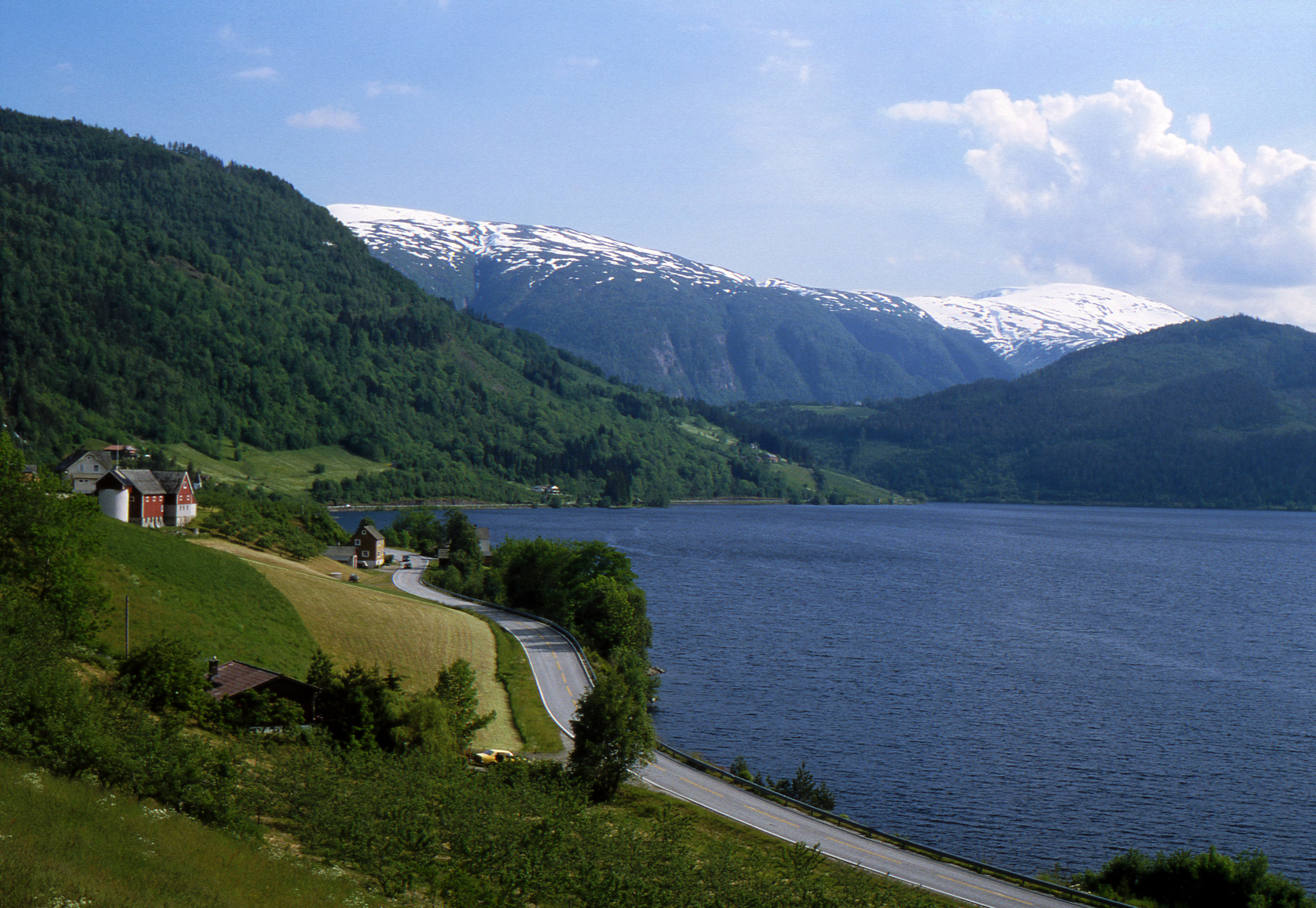
- Interactive map of Granvinsvatnet
- Location: Voss Municipality, Vestland
- Coordinates: 60.5523°N 6.7145°E
- Basin countries: Norway
- Max. length: 4.4 kilometres (2.7 mi)
- Max. width: 1.2 kilometres (0.75 mi)
- Surface area: 4.05 km^{2} (1.56 sq mi)
- Shore length^{1}: 10.97 kilometres (6.82 mi)
- Surface elevation: 24 metres (79 ft)
- References: NVE
- ^{1} Shore length is not a well-defined measure.

Granvinsvatnet is a lake in Voss Municipality in Vestland county, Norway. The 4.05-square-kilometre (1.56 sq mi) lake sits just north of the village of Eide (also known as Granvin).

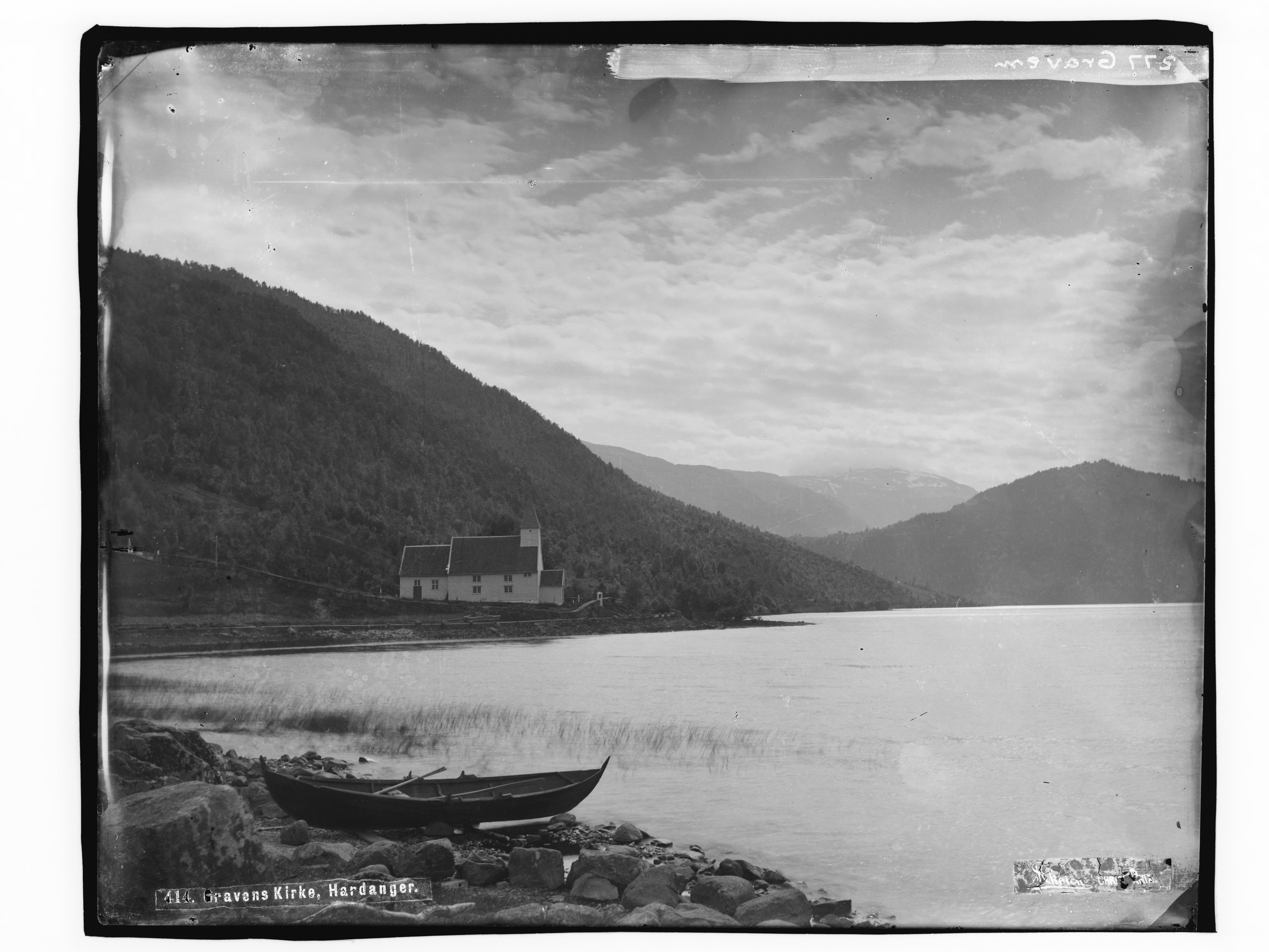
View of the lake and Granvin Church

The Norwegian National Road 13 exits the Tunsberg Tunnel just northwest of the lake and then runs along the northern and eastern shores of the lake before entering the Vallavik Tunnel just off the southeastern tip of the lake. The Joberg Tunnel along the northern part of this lake opened in September 2017. The old Hardanger Line railway used to run along the west side of the lake. Granvin Church lies along the eastern shore of the lake.

== See also ==
- List of lakes in Norway
