= Norwegian County Road 5098 =

Road in Vestland, Norway

County Road 5098

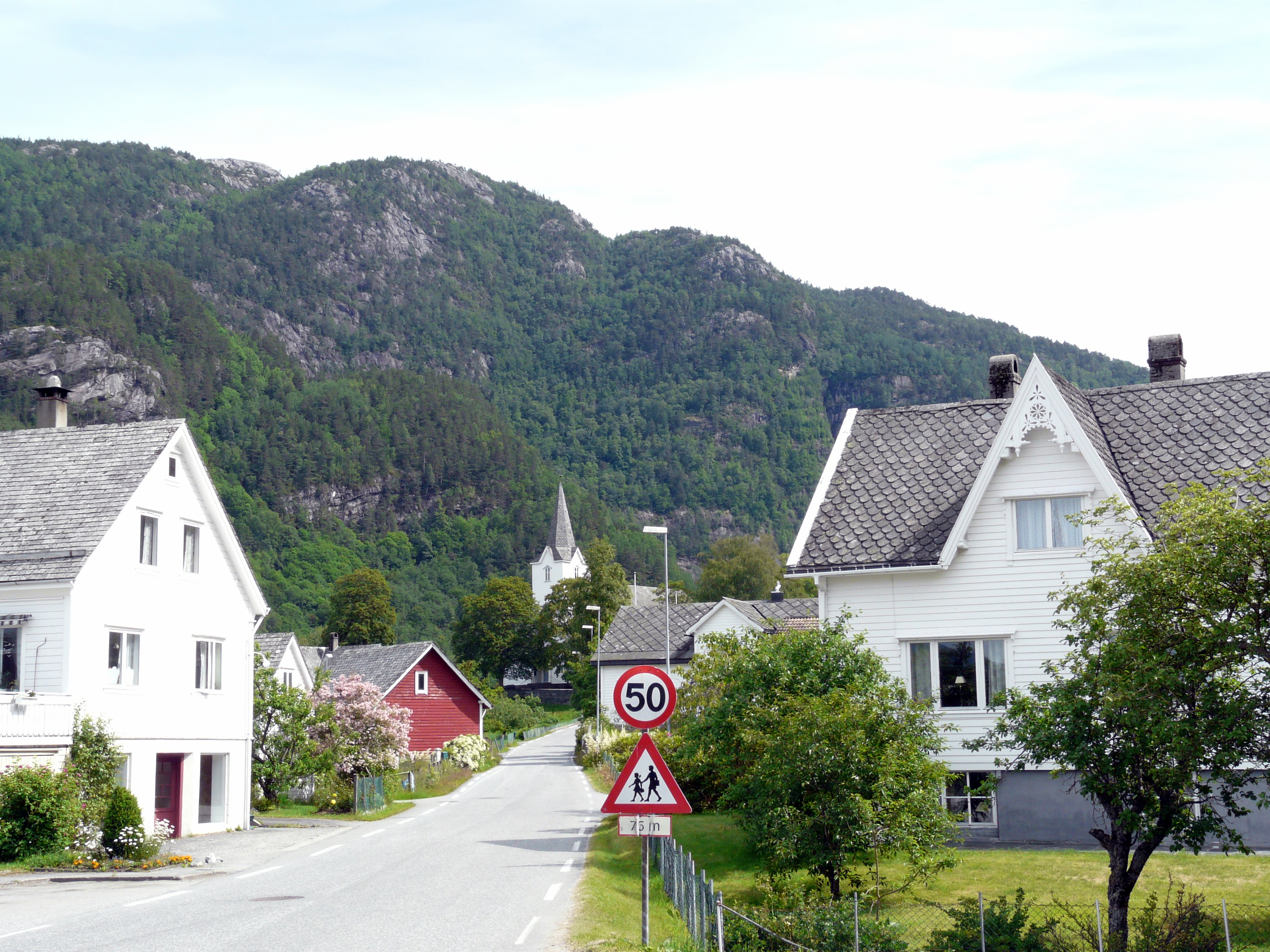
- West end of County Road 5098 in Jondal

Route information
- Length: 9.8 km (6.1 mi)

Major junctions
- West end: Fv550 at Jondal
- East end: Krossdalen

Location
- Country: Norway
- Counties: Vestland

Highway system
- Roads in Norway; National Roads; County Roads

County Road 5098 (Norwegian: Fylkesvei 5098) is an 9.8-kilometer (6.1 mi) county road in Ullensvang Municipality in Vestland county, Norway. The road runs from the village of Jondal to the municipal subdivision of Krossdalen.

The route branches off from Norwegian County Road 550 and follows the Jondal River (Jondalselvi) east to Lake Byrkjeland (Byrkjelandsvatnet) and Lake Espeland (Espelandsvatnet) and then continues further east along the Krossdal River (Krossdalselvi) to its beginning at the confluence of the Brattabø River (Brattabøelvi) and Flatabø River (Flatabøelvi), where it terminates at the Brattabø farm.

The road was re-numbered in 2019 because Hordaland and Sogn og Fjordane counties were scheduled to merge and there were county roads in both counties with the same number. This road previously was County Road 105.
