= Toka Gorge =

River gorge in Norway

- Tokagjelet (Norwegian)
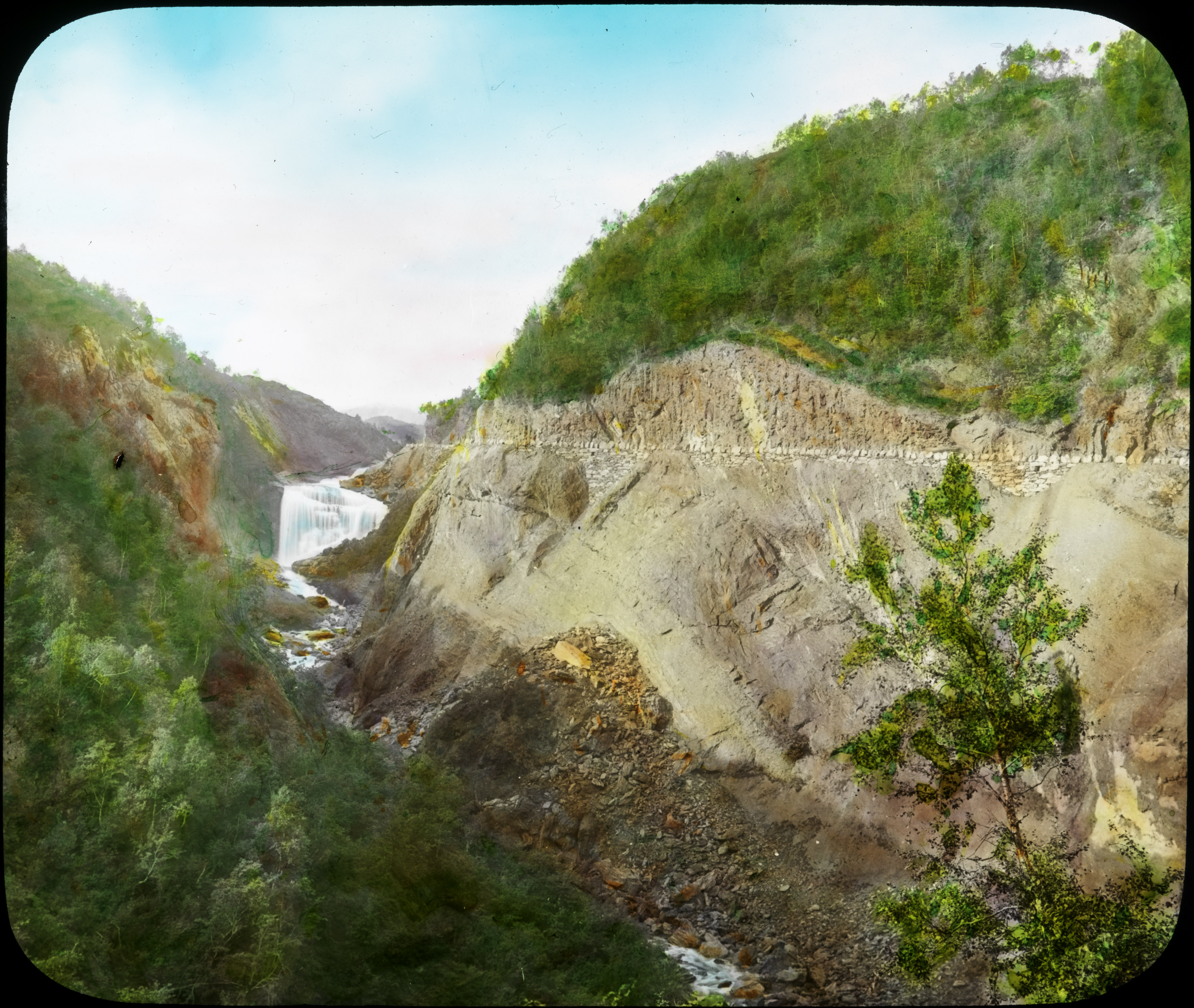
- The Toka Gorge c. 1915
- Floor elevation: 202 m (663 ft)

Geology
- Type: River valley

Geography
- Location: Vestland, Norway
- Coordinates: 60.36708°N 6.03862°E

Location
- Interactive map of Toka Gorge

The Toka Gorge (English) or Tokagjelet (Norwegian) is a river gorge in Kvam Municipality in Vestland county, Norway. The gorge lies west of the village of Norheimsund along the Norwegian County Road 49.

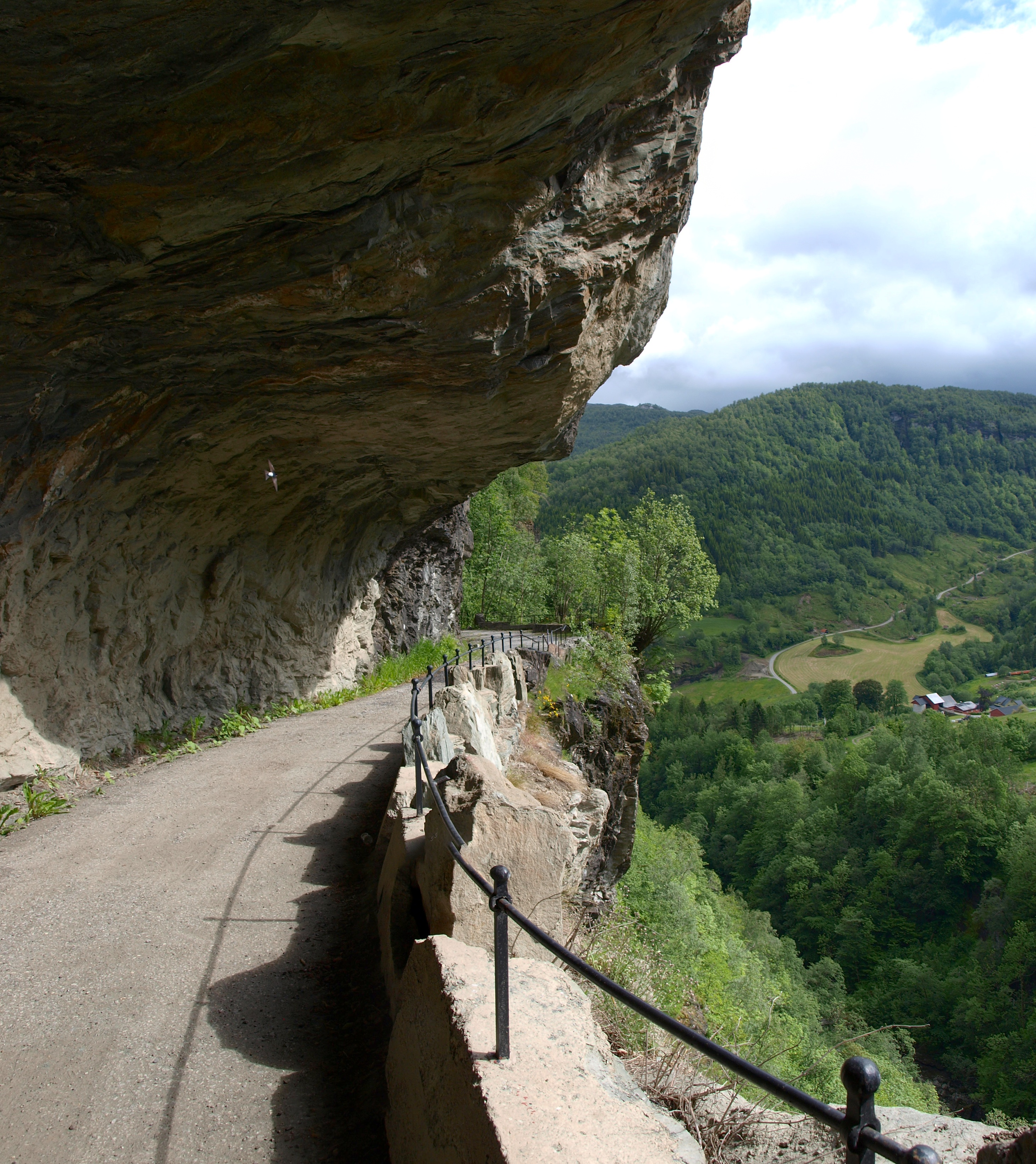
Four sections parallel to the new tunnels preserve the old route of the road through the gorge.

== History ==
The gorge is traversed by Norwegian County Road 49 (historically the road was part of Norwegian County Road 7), which was laid out around 1890, started being built in 1903, and it was opened in 1907. Large parts of the road were built by hand while workers hung on ropes against the sheer mountainside. A new route with four tunnels was built between 1953 and 1956. In 2009 the Norwegian Directorate for Cultural Heritage protected the old road as part of the National Protection Plan for Roads, Bridges, and Road-Related Cultural Heritage.

=== Name ===
The name Tokagjelet comes from Old Norse word tǫk, the plural of tak which means 'grip' or 'hold' plus the definite form of the word gjel which means 'gorge' or 'ravine' (gjel comes from the Old Norse word gil).
