= Folkedal Tunnel =

Road tunnel in Norway

Folkedal Tunnel Folkedalstunnelen
- Interactive map of Folkedal Tunnel; Folkedalstunnelen

Overview
- Location: Vestland, Norway
- Coordinates: 60°29′45″N 6°39′35″E
- Status: In use
- Route: Fv7
- Start: Folkedal, Voss Municipality
- End: Ytrabøneset, Voss Municipality

Operation
- Opened: November 10, 2015
- Operator: Norwegian Public Roads Administration
- Character: Automotive

Technical
- Length: 1,370 meters (4,490 ft)

The Folkedal Tunnel (Norwegian: Folkedalstunnelen) is a road tunnel in Voss Municipality in Vestland county, Norway. The 1,370-meter (4,490 ft) long tunnel is located on Norwegian County Road 7 above the Granvin Fjord and was opened on November 10, 2015. Breakthrough in the tunnel occurred on October 29, 2014.

The name Folkedalstunellen ('Folkedal Tunnel') was officially approved by the Hordaland County Municipality, which was the project's contractor. The tunnel was built as part of landslide protection measures between Norheimsund and the Hardanger Bridge. Together with 965 meters (3,166 ft) of road, the construction cost NOK 274 million.
