= Norwegian National Road 191 =

Road in Norway

Coordinates: 59°55′59″N 110°51′36″E

National Road 191
- Bokmål: Riksvei 191; Nynorsk: Riksveg 191

Route information
- Length: 1.7 km (1.1 mi)

Location
- Country: Norway

Highway system
- Roads in Norway; National Roads; County Roads

Norwegian National Road 191 (Norwegian: Riksvei 191) runs down Groruddalen in Oslo from north to south. The road runs between Trosterud in Alna and Veitvet in Grorud. The road (excluding junction) is 1.7 km. Including Alfasetveien, a side arm to the cargo terminal, total length is about 2.8 km.

The road consists of Tvetenveien and Nedre Kalbakkvei. The road is currently two-laned, but Nedre Kalbakkvei up to Alfaset is often used as a four-laned road. This is because heavy transport often use the terminal in Alna, at Alna Station.
