= Ingebjørg Prestegard =

Norwegian politician (1928–2019)

Ingebjørg Prestegard (3 April 1928 – 15 January 2019) was a Norwegian politician for the Centre Party.

For the 1973 Norwegian parliamentary election she was the third candidate on the ballot in Hordaland, behind Sverre Helland and Berge Sæberg. She was elected as a deputy representative for the term 1973–1977, and again became a deputy in 1977–1981. In total she met during 10 days of parliamentary session. In local politics, she was mayor of Granvin Municipality. Prestegard died on 15 January 2019, at the age of 90.
