= Granvin (village) =

Village in Voss Municipality, Norway

Granvin Eide
- Village
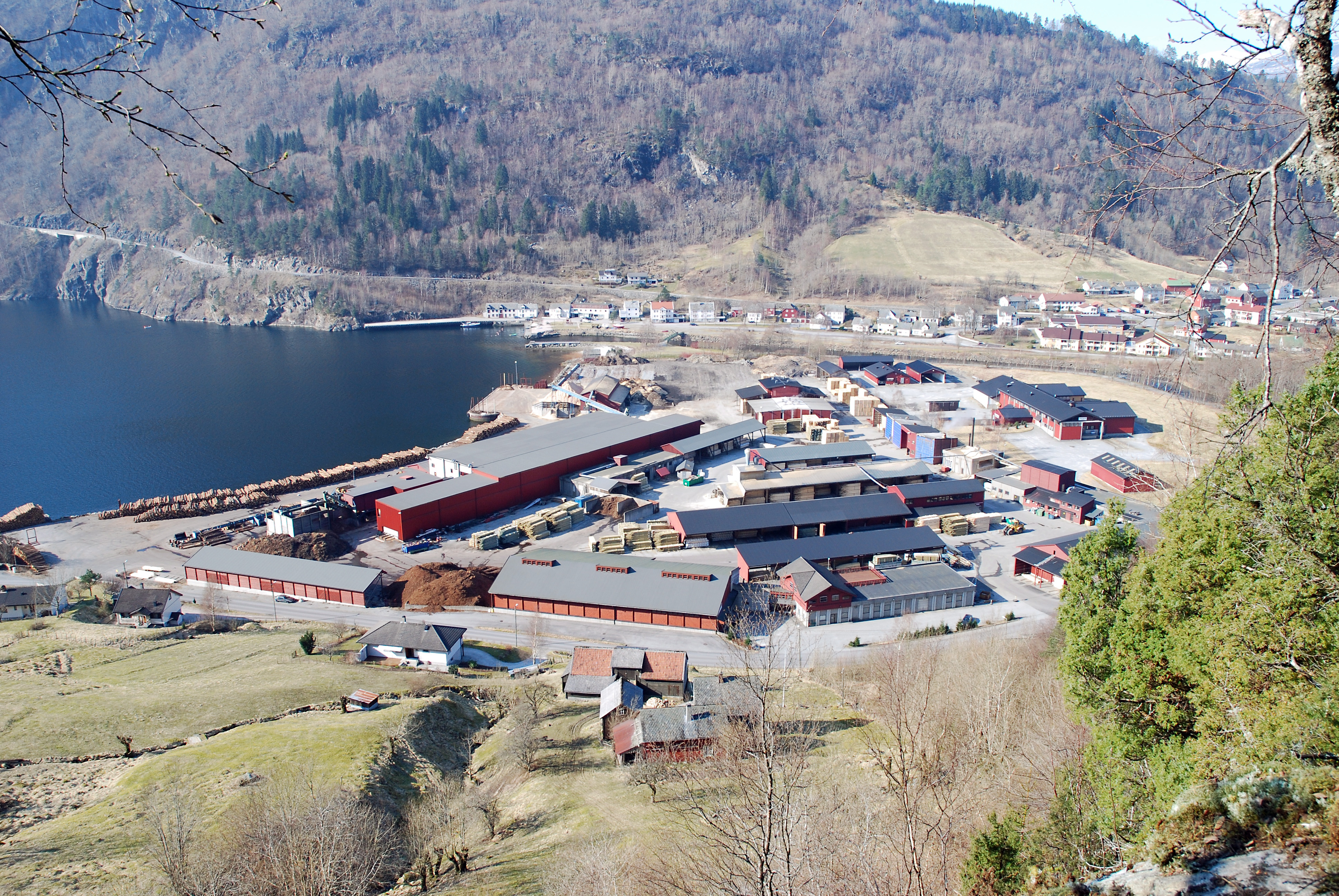
- View of the shoreline of the village
- Interactive map of Granvin; Eide
- Coordinates: 60.52407°N 6.71931°E
- Country: Norway
- Region: Western Norway
- County: Vestland
- District: Hardanger
- Municipality: Voss Municipality

Area
  - Total: 0.74 km^{2} (0.29 sq mi)
- Elevation: 9 m (30 ft)

Population (2025)
  - Total: 539
  - Density: 728/km^{2} (1,890/sq mi)
- Time zone: UTC+01:00 (CET)
  - Summer (DST): UTC+02:00 (CEST)
- Post Code: 5736 Granvin

Granvin or Eide is a village in Voss Municipality in Vestland county, Norway. The village is located at the head of the Granvin Fjord in the southeastern part of the municipality. The large village of Vossavangen lies about 25 kilometres (16 mi) to the northwest and the village of Ulvik (in Ulvik Municipality) lies about 20 kilometres (12 mi) to the northeast.

The 0.74-square-kilometre (180-acre) village has a population (2025) of 539728 and a population density of 728 inhabitants per square kilometre (1,890/sq mi).

== History ==
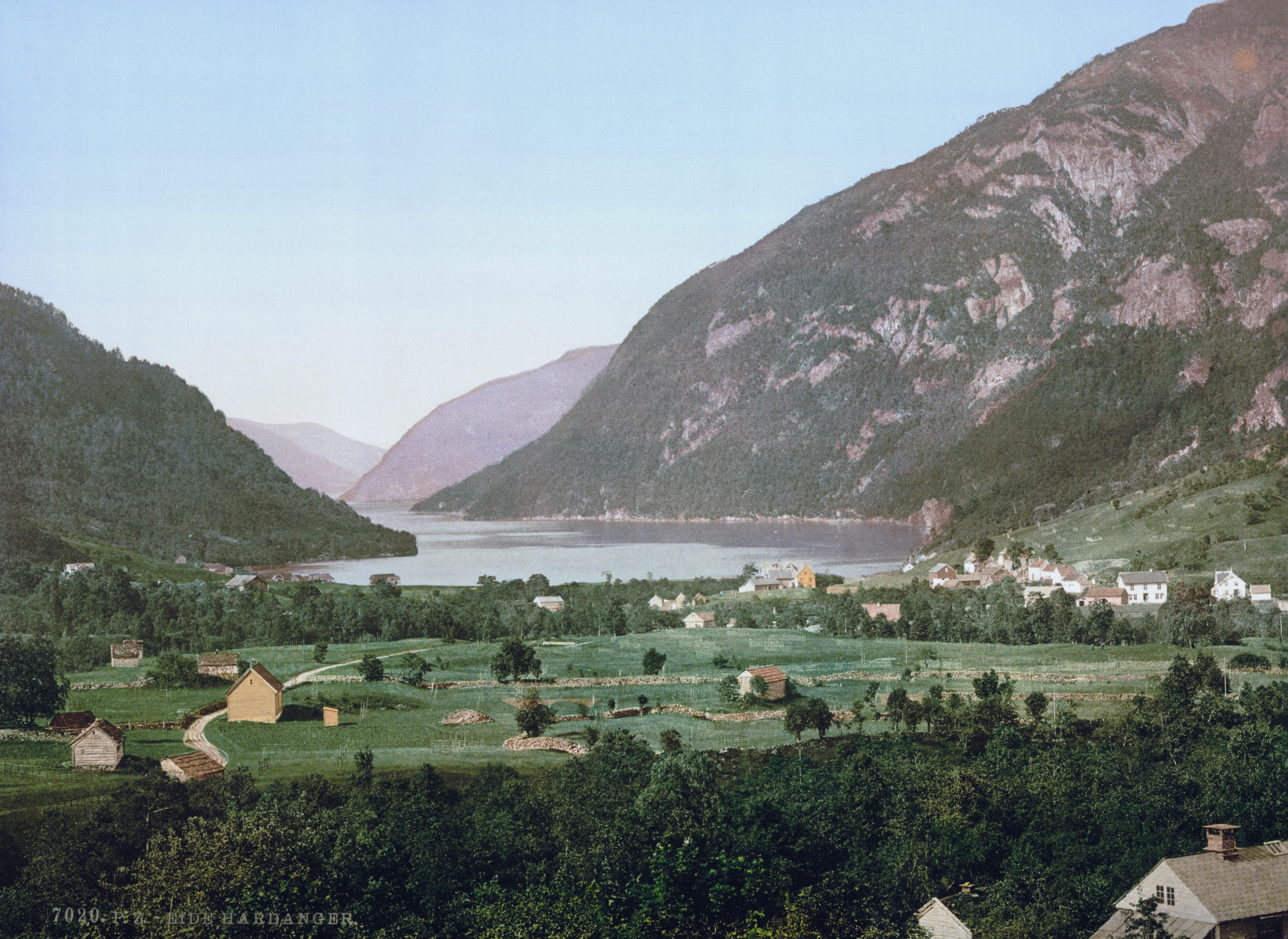
View of Eide in 1905

From 1838 until 2020, the village was the administrative centre of the old Granvin Municipality which is now part of Voss Municipality.

=== Name ===
The village is known as Eide because it sits along a river on an isthmus of land between the fjord and the lake Granvinsvatnet. ("Eide" is the Norwegian word that means "isthmus".) The village is also known as Granvin since it was the municipal centre and largest settlement in the old Granvin Municipality. Both names can be used interchangeably. There is also a small farm area called "Granvin" located about 4 kilometres (2.5 mi) north of the village, and that is where Granvin Church is located. This village and that farm area share the same name, but are two distinct locations in the municipality.

== Transportation ==
Norwegian National Road 13 runs past the village, just to the north. The entrance to the Vallavik Tunnel lies on the northern edge of the village.

== Notable people ==
Notable people that were born or lived in Granvin include:

- Thrond Sjursen Haukenæs (1840–1922), a folklore collector and author
