= Granvin Church =

Church in Vestland, Norway

- Granvin kyrkje
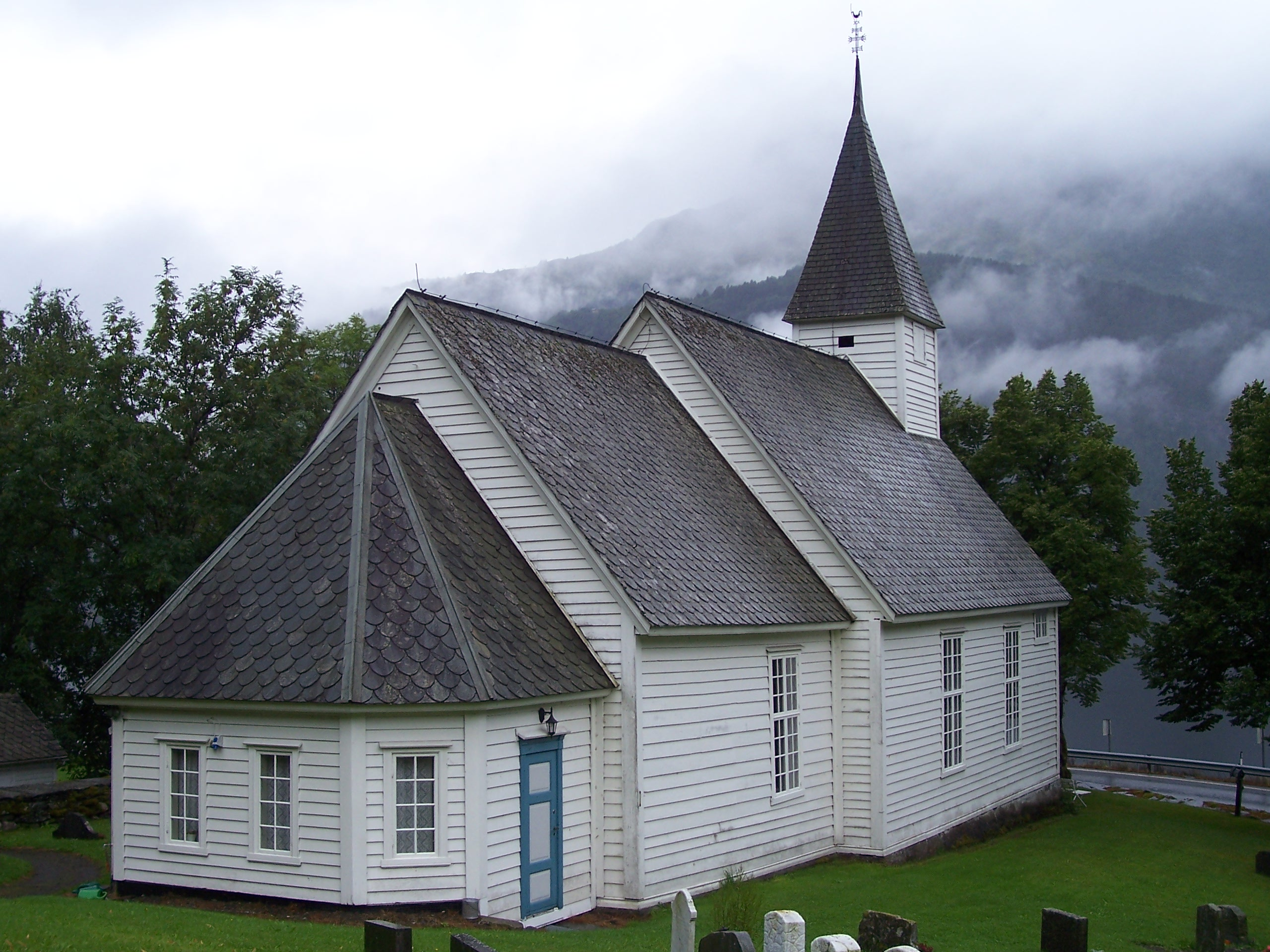
- View of the church
- Granvin Church
- 60°33′19″N 6°43′51″E
- Location: Voss, Vestland
- Country: Norway
- Denomination: Church of Norway
- Previous denomination: Catholic Church
- Churchmanship: Evangelical Lutheran

History
- Status: Parish church
- Founded: 13th century
- Consecrated: 1726

Architecture
- Functional status: Active
- Architectural type: Long church
- Completed: 1726 (300 years ago)

Specifications
- Capacity: 350
- Materials: Wood

Administration
- Diocese: Bjørgvin bispedømme
- Deanery: Hardanger og Voss prosti
- Parish: Granvin
- Norwegian Cultural Heritage Site
- Type: Church
- Status: Automatically protected
- ID: 84408

Granvin Church (Norwegian: Granvin kyrkje) is a parish church of the Church of Norway in Voss Municipality in Vestland county, Norway. It is located on the eastern shore of the Granvinsvatnet in the small farm area called "Granvin". This place located a few kilometers north of the village of Granvin. It is the church for the Granvin parish which is part of the Hardanger og Voss prosti (deanery) in the Diocese of Bjørgvin. The white, wooden church was built in a long church design in 1726 using plans drawn up by an unknown architect. The church seats about 350 people.

== History ==
The earliest existing historical records of the church date back to the year 1306, but it was not built that year. The first church was a wooden stave church that was likely built during the 13th century. There were covered corridors surrounding the whole stave church. In 1690–1692, the nave was extended to the west and a new tower was constructed on the west end of the newly enlarged nave. The new construction was a timber-framed building attached to the medieval stave construction. Then in 1703, the choir was also extended to the east by 5 metres (16 ft). In 1726, the church was sold to two private landowners Kristoffer Aamundsen Ødven and Sivert Gundersen. At the time of the sale, the 14.5-by-6.9-metre (48 ft × 23 ft) building was described as "very rundown". Shortly thereafter, the church was torn down and replaced by a new timber-framed long church building. The new church was about 1/3rd larger in both width and length, measuring 22.5 by 8.7 metres (74 ft × 29 ft). In 1853–1855, the church was renovated to the layout of the present-day church. The church was sold to the parish in 1857. In 1911, the church was renovated again.

== Media gallery ==
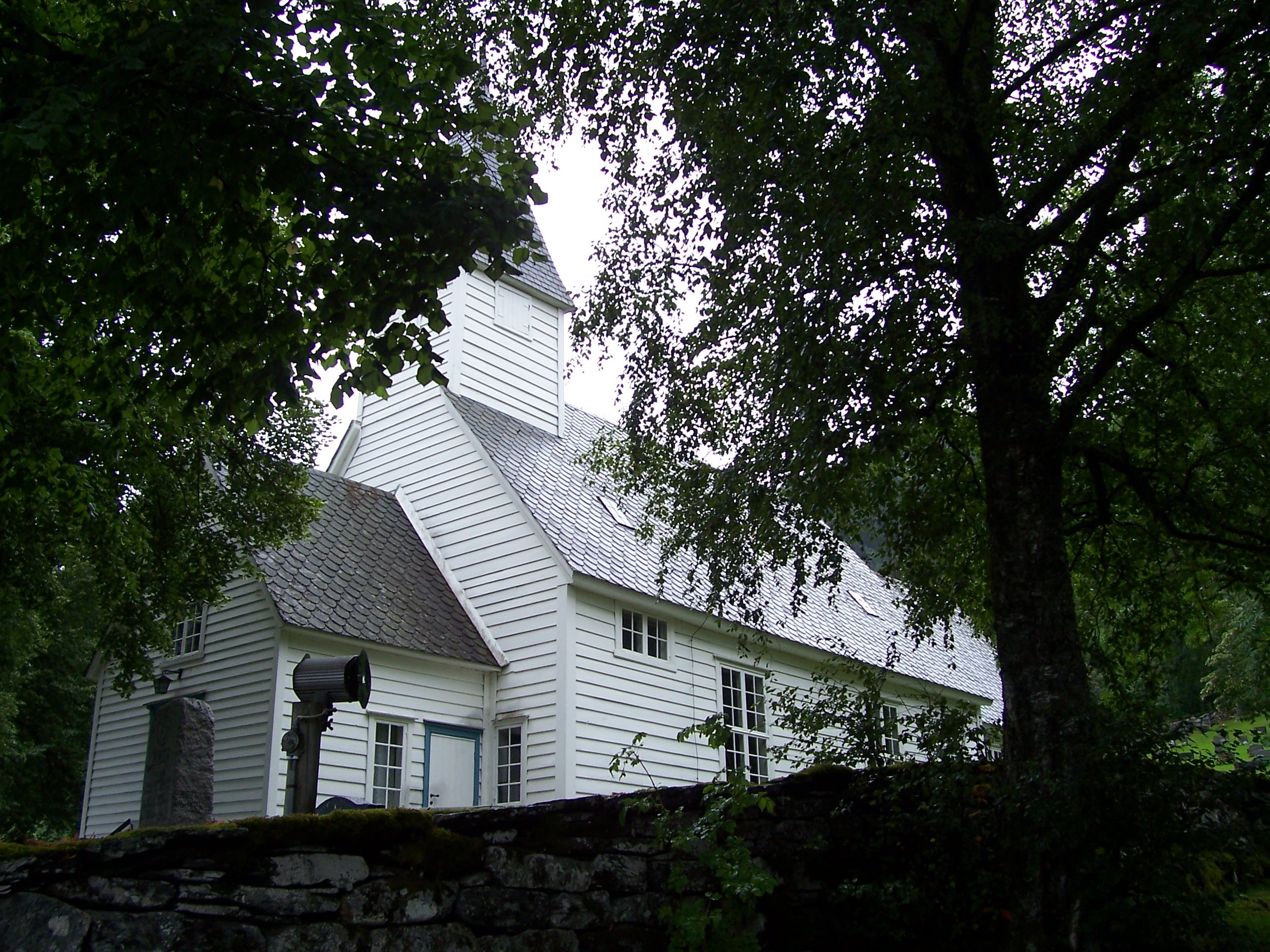

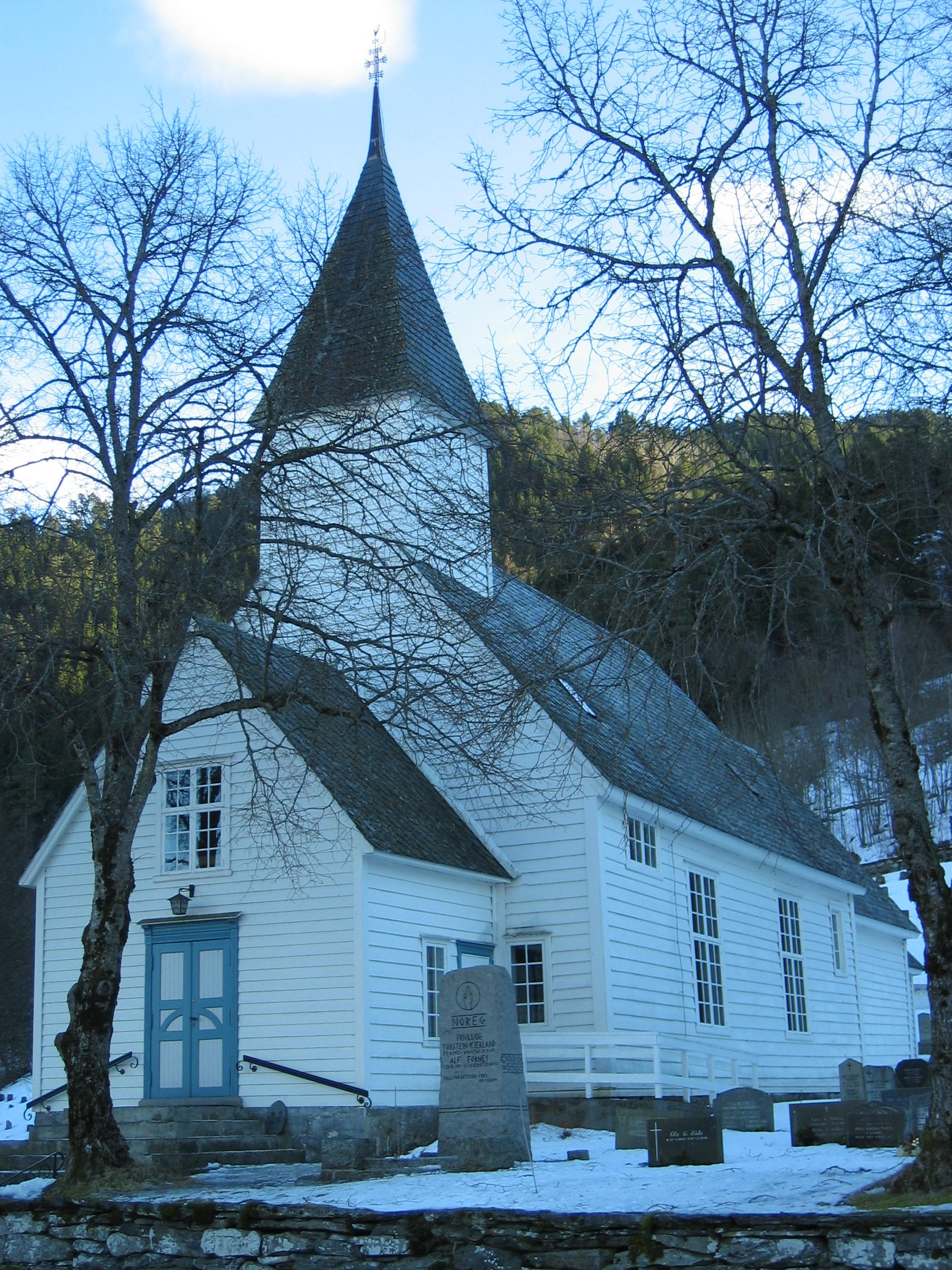

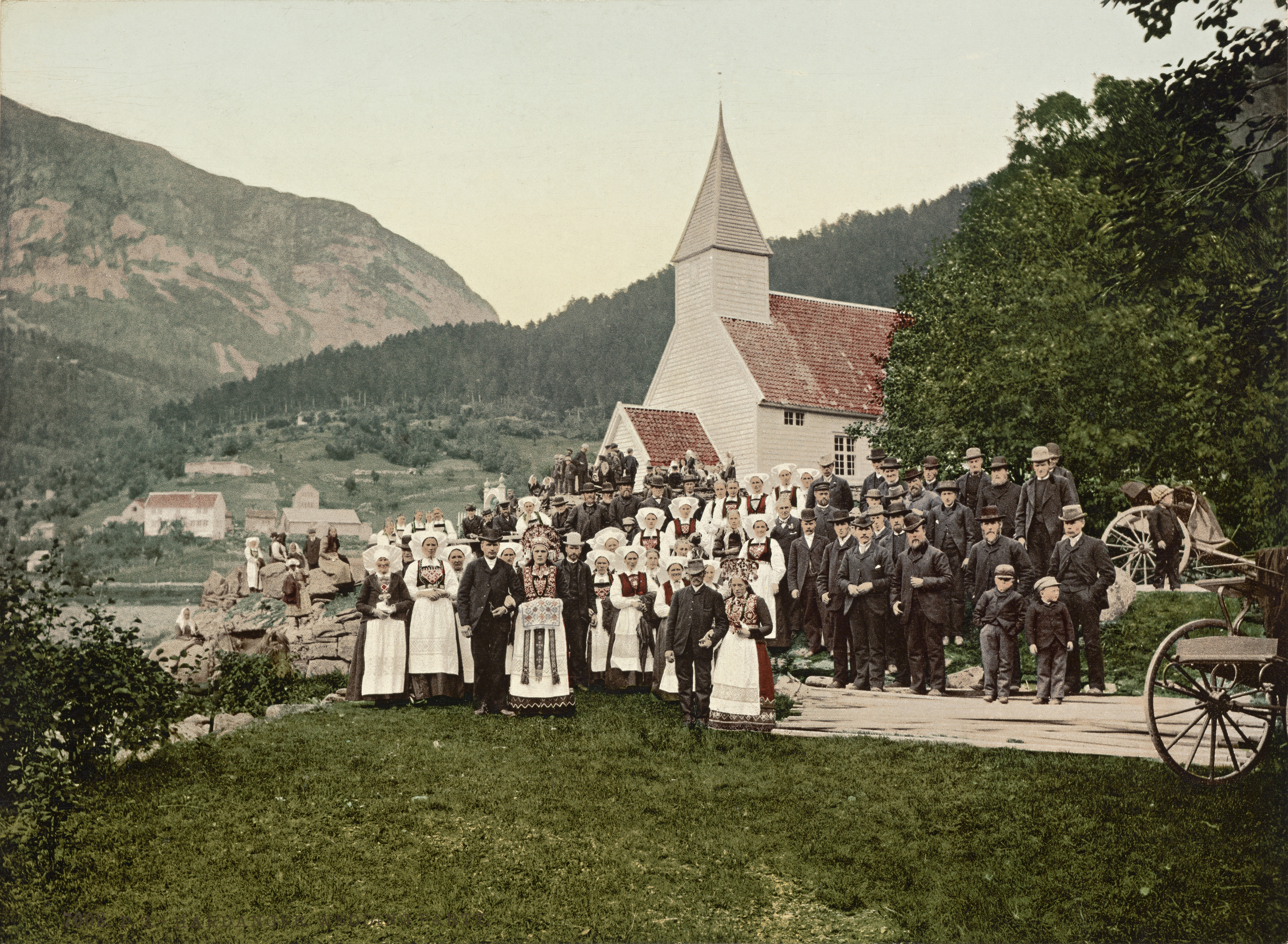

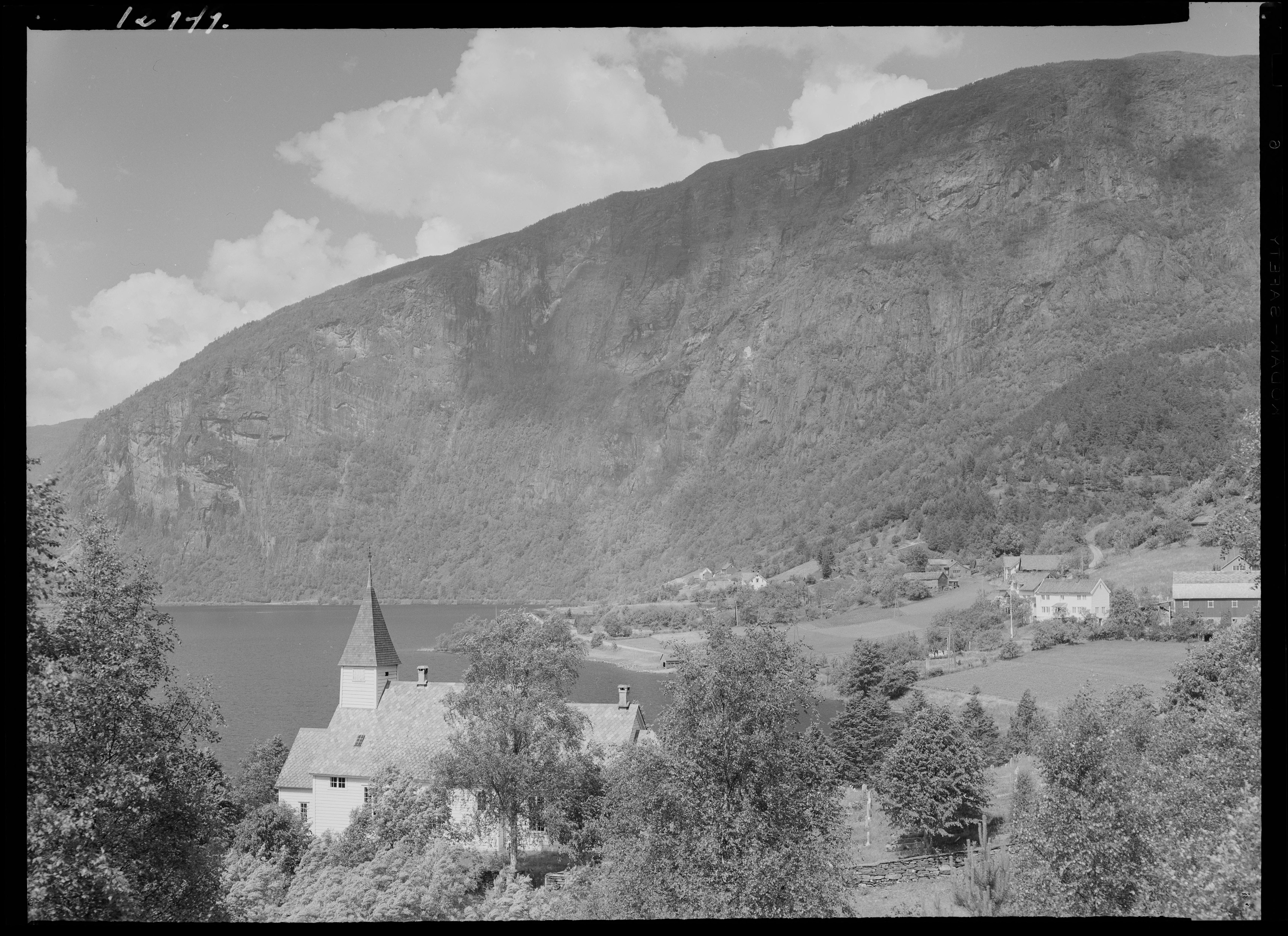

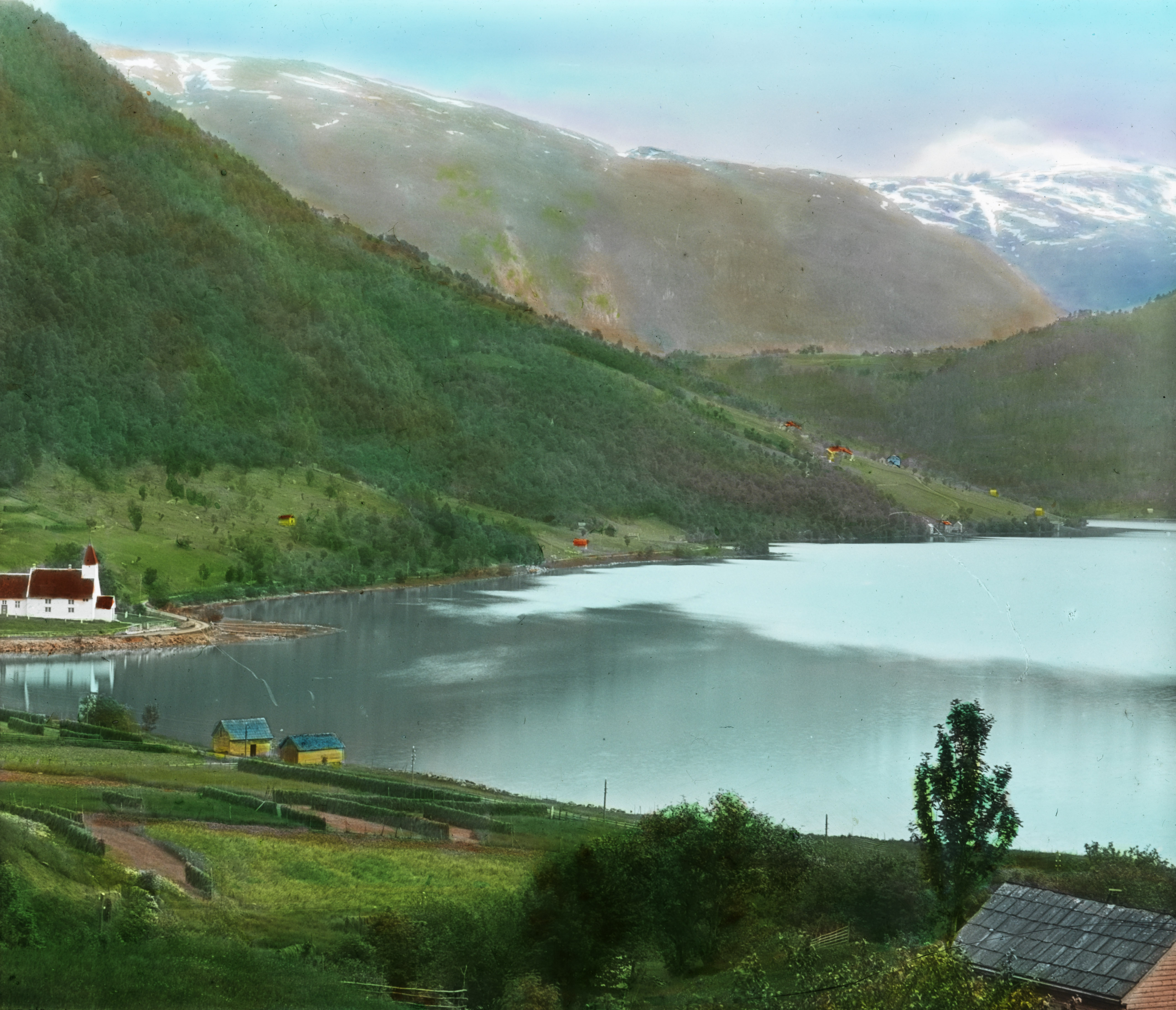

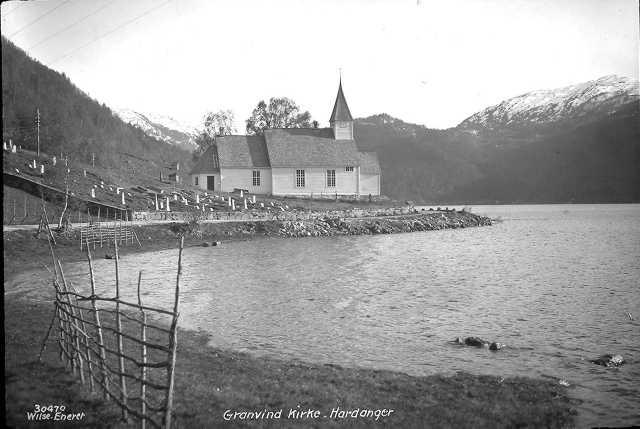

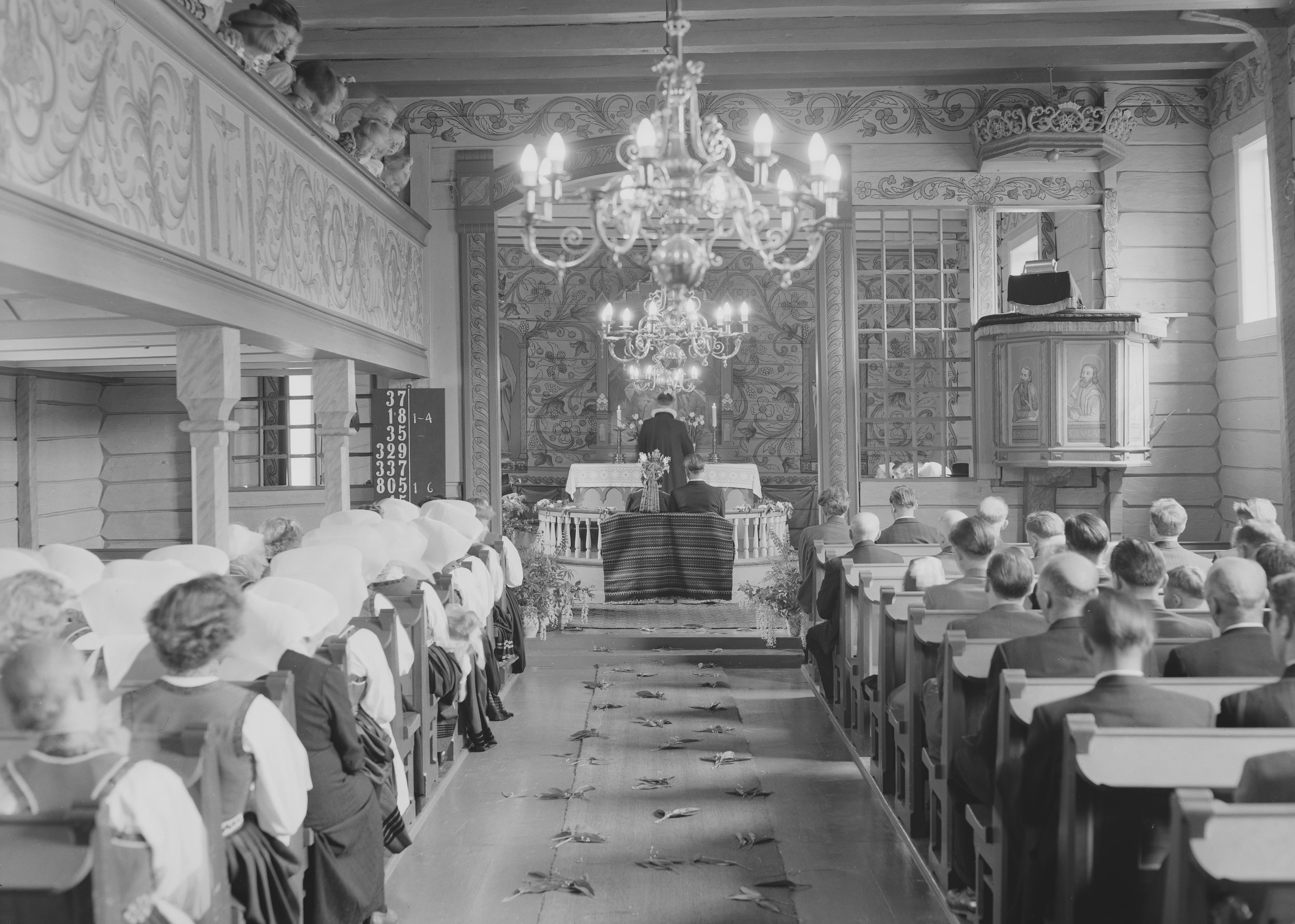

== See also ==
- List of churches in Bjørgvin
