= Norwegian national road =

One of the major trunk roads in Norway

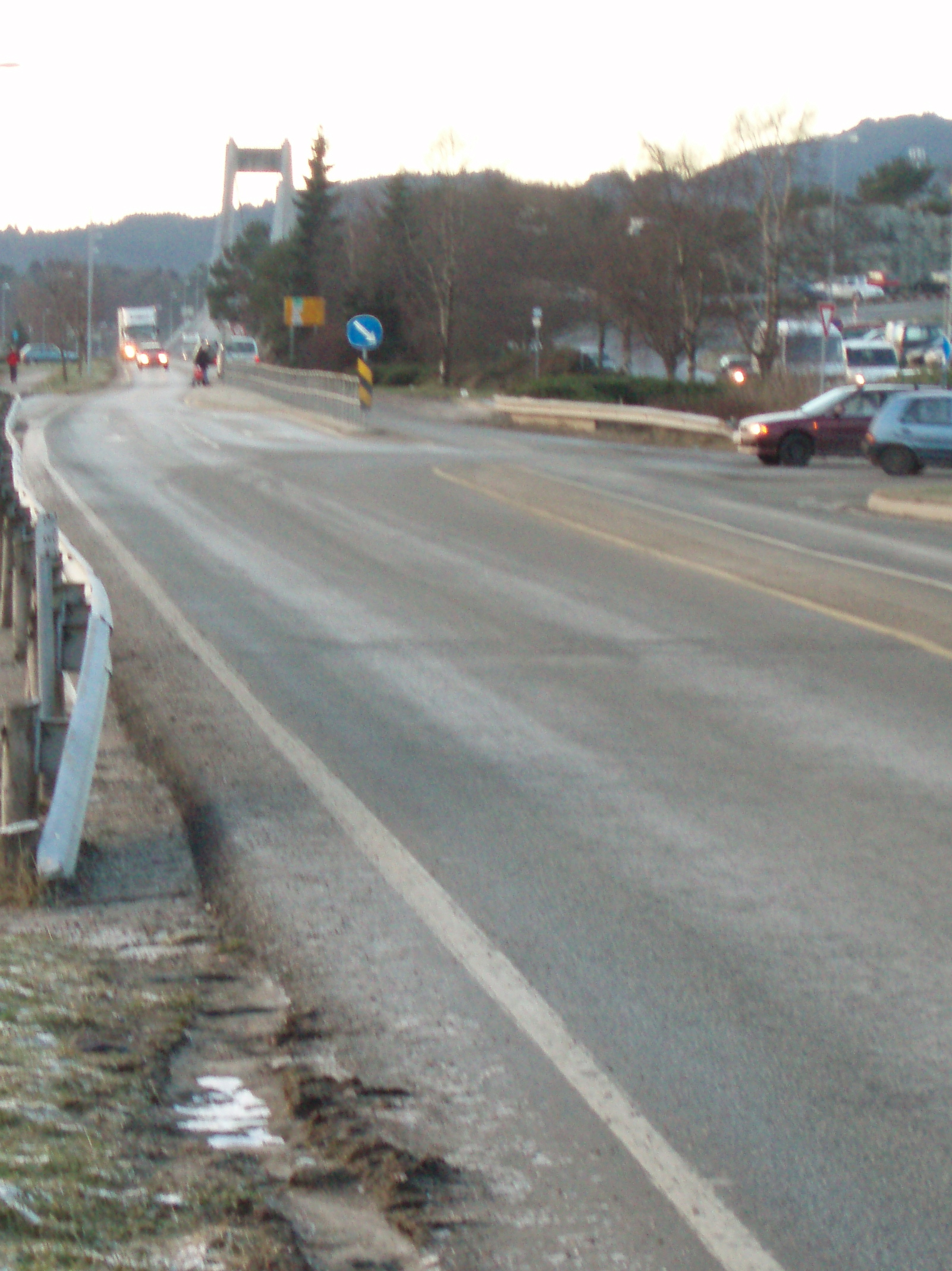
National road and European route E39 at Knarvik, Hordaland.

Norwegian national roads (Norwegian: riksvei/riksveg abbr. Rv; literally: road of the realm), are roads thus categorized by the Norwegian Public Roads Administration (Statens vegvesen) which also maintains them. In 2007 there were 27,343 kilometers (16,990 mi) of this class of Norwegian roads, which constituted 29.4% of public roads in Norway.

From 2010, after an administrative reform, most of the national roads were transferred to the counties. They are now called county roads along with the already existing county roads. 17,200 kilometers (10,700 mi) of national roads were transferred along with an annual compensation of 6.9 billion NOK for maintenance. As of January 1, 2010, there were 10,451 kilometers (6,494 mi) of national roads left.

National roads are selected by the criteria of being important for long-distance travel. Some roads connecting to primary airports are also included.

National roads are divided into two categories: European routes and other national roads. The route signs for the European routes have an "E" preceding the national road number, and the sign is green with white script. Other national roads are also designated using green signs.

== Former national roads ==
All pre-2010 national roads have an asphalt concrete cover. Exceptions are some roads that have been given special status or protection. The "gravel roads package" was a governmental plan which ensured that all national roads without special importance in the National Protection Plan for Roads, Bridges, and Road-Related Cultural Heritage (Nasjonal verneplan for veger, bruer og vegrelaterte kulturminner) received asphalt covering. Norwegian National Road 716 between Bergli and Valen in Frøya Municipality in Trøndelag county was the last regular stretch of national road with a gravel coating. The last two remaining kilometers were asphalted on 17 December 2003, with participation by Minister of Transport and Communications Torild Skogsholm, among others.

Former national roads in Norway that are maintained as gravel roads according to the protection plan are Road 252 (Tyin–Eidsbugarden), Road 258 (Grotli-Ospeli bru), and Road 886 (Bjørnstad–Jacobselv). All these roads have been converted to county roads after the 2010 transportation reform.

The organization of national, county, and village roads (later municipal roads) was introduced in 1931. Starting in 1912, the roads were divided into main roads ("hovedveier") and village roads ("bygdeveier"). In 1931, signposted numbers for national roads were introduced. The main roads were two digits ending with zero, for example Road 50 Oslo–Kirkenes. The main roads in Østfold were numbered 1–9 based on an older local system. In 1965, a new system which included E-roads was introduced, and most of it is still used today (2019).

== Records of Norwegian national roads ==
Record	Route	Measurement	End points / Location
Longest national road in Norway; Longest European route in Norway	E6	2,578 km (1,602 mi)	Svinesund – Kirkenes
Longest national road in Norway which is not a European route	Rv13	427 km (265 mi)	Sogndalsfjøra – Stavanger
Longest European route running partially through Norway	E75	4,340 km (2,700 mi)	Vardø – Sitia in Greece
Shortest European route in Norway	E105	15 km (9.3 mi)	Kirkenes – Storskog border
Shortest other national road	Rv191	1.7 km (1.1 mi)	Alna in Oslo
Longest national road tunnel (world record)	E16	24.51 km (15.23 mi)	Lærdal Tunnel
Longest national road bridge	E18	1,892 m (6,207 ft)	Drammen Bridge
Highest national road mountain pass	Rv7	1,250 m (4,100 ft) above sea level	Hardangervidda
Lowest national road	Rv13	292 m (958 ft) below sea level	Ryfylke Tunnel
Longest domestic ferry stretch	Rv80	192 km (119 mi) (8–9 hrs)	Bodø – Røst – Værøya – Moskenes
National road with the most domestic ferry stretches	E39	7 ferries	Trondheim – Kristiansand

== See also ==
- Swedish national road
- Motorvei
