= Vallavik Tunnel =

Road tunnel in Vestland county, Norway

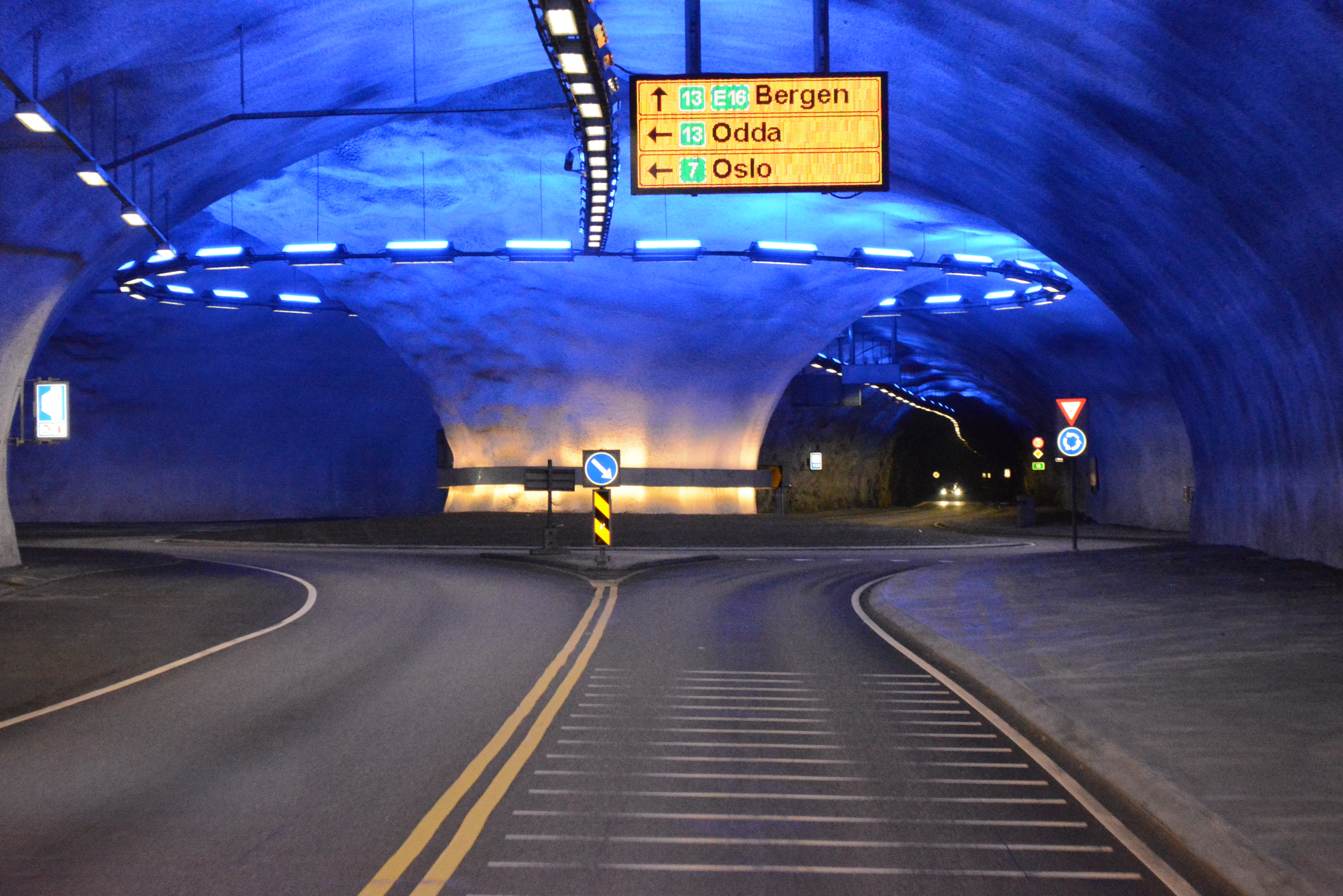
- View of the roundabout inside the tunnel
- Interactive map of Vallavik Tunnel

Overview
- Location: Vestland, Norway
- Coordinates: 60.5124°N 6.7772°E
- Route: Rv13 / Rv7
- Start: Eide (Voss Municipality)
- End: Vallavik (Ulvik Municipality)

Operation
- Opened: 1985 (added new section in 2013)
- Owner: Statens vegvesen

Technical
- Length: 7,510 metres (4.67 mi)

The Vallavik Tunnel (Norwegian: Vallaviktunnelen) is a road tunnel in Vestland county, Norway. The tunnel begins on the north edge of the village of Eide in Voss Municipality and runs to the southeast, ending at the small farm of Vallaviki in Ulvik Municipality. The tunnel is part of Norwegian National Road 13. The 7,510-metre (24,640 ft) tunnel was originally opened on April 27, 1985.

In 2013, a roundabout and a 600-metre (2,000 ft) long branch were added near the southern end of the tunnel to connect with the newly constructed Hardanger Bridge. The branch passes directly over the older Djønno Tunnel.
