= Tunsberg Tunnel =

Road tunnel in Norway

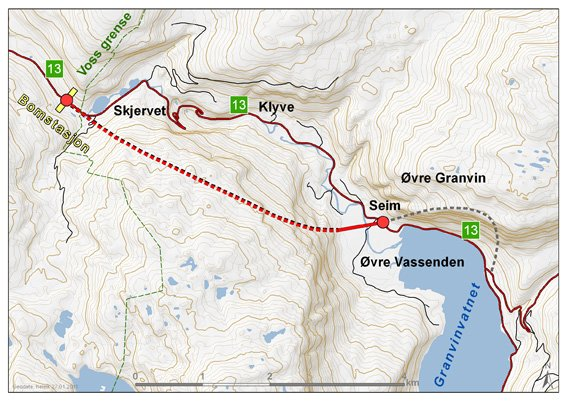
- Interactive map of Tunsberg Tunnel

Overview
- Location: Vestland, Norway
- Coordinates: 60.5754°N 6.6552°E
- Route: Rv13

Operation
- Work began: Nov 2009
- Opened: 20 Dec 2011
- Owner: Statens vegvesen
- Traffic: Automotive
- Vehicles per day: 2000

Technical
- Length: 4,080 metres (13,390 ft)
- No. of lanes: 2
- Grade: 5.07%

The Tunsberg Tunnel (Norwegian: Tunsbergtunnelen) is a road tunnel in Voss Municipality in Vestland county, Norway. The 4,080-metre (13,390 ft) long tunnel was built from 2009 until 2011 to replace a stretch of Norwegian National Road 13 just west of Seim. That stretch of roadway was full of narrow, tight hairpin turns. The tunnel has no turns and has a maximum grade of 5.07%. It was officially opened on 20 December 2011 by Magnhild Meltveit Kleppa, the Minister of Transport and Communications at that time.
