= Granvin Fjord =

Fjord in Vestland, Norway

- Granvinsfjorden (Norwegian)
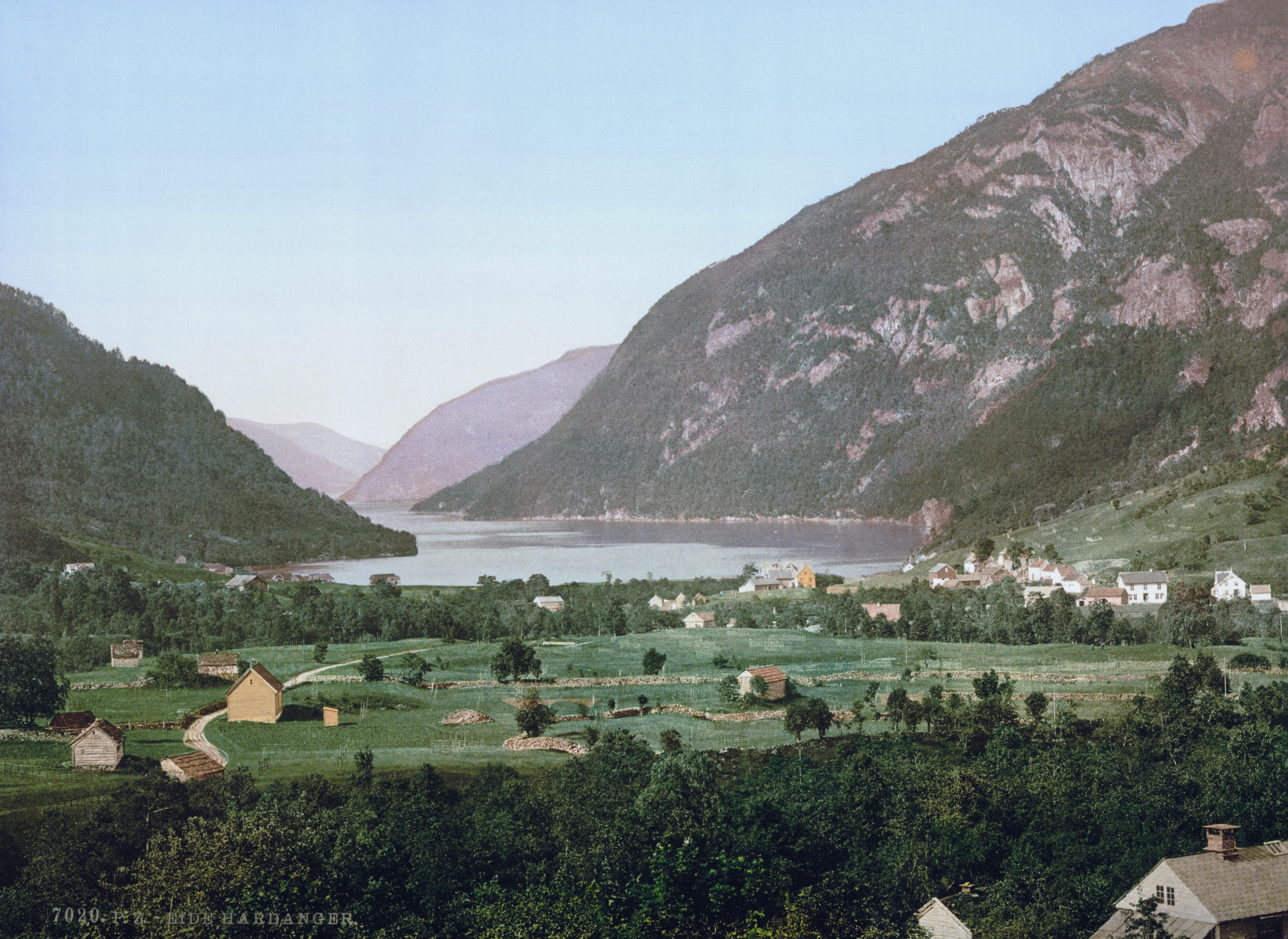
- The Granvin Fjord at the end of the 1800s
- Interactive map of Granvin Fjord
- Location: Vestland county, Norway
- Coordinates: 60.48677°N 6.66203°E
- Type: Fjord
- Basin countries: Norway
- Max. length: 10 kilometres (6.2 mi)
- Settlements: Granvin

The Granvin Fjord (English) or Granvinsfjorden (Norwegian) is an arm of the large Hardanger Fjord in Voss Municipality in Vestland county, Norway. The fjord is about 10 kilometers (6.2 mi) long and its width is mostly less than 1 kilometer (0.62 mi). It has its inlet at the part of the Hardanger Fjord known as the Inner Samla Fjord (Norwegian: Indre Samlafjorden) between two small peninsulas: Furenes by the village of Tjoflot on the east side and Håstabbenes on the west side. From there, the fjord runs in a northeast direction to the village of Granvin at the head of the fjord. The fjord has steep sides and is bordered by mountains up to 1,200 meters (3,900 ft) high.

Norwegian County Road 79 runs along the entire west side of the fjord. It passes through the village of Kvanndal, about 2 kilometers (1.2 mi) into the fjord, where there is a ferry connection across the Hardanger Fjord to Utne and Kinsarvik in Ullensvang Municipality. The village of Folkedal lies 3 kilometers (1.9 mi) further into the fjord, just before the Folkedal Tunnel. On the east side, across the fjord from Folkedal, is the village of Hamre. There are no significant settlements between these two villages and the head of the fjord.

== See also ==
- List of Norwegian fjords
