= National Protection Plan for Roads, Bridges, and Road-Related Cultural Heritage =

Norwegian road conservation plan

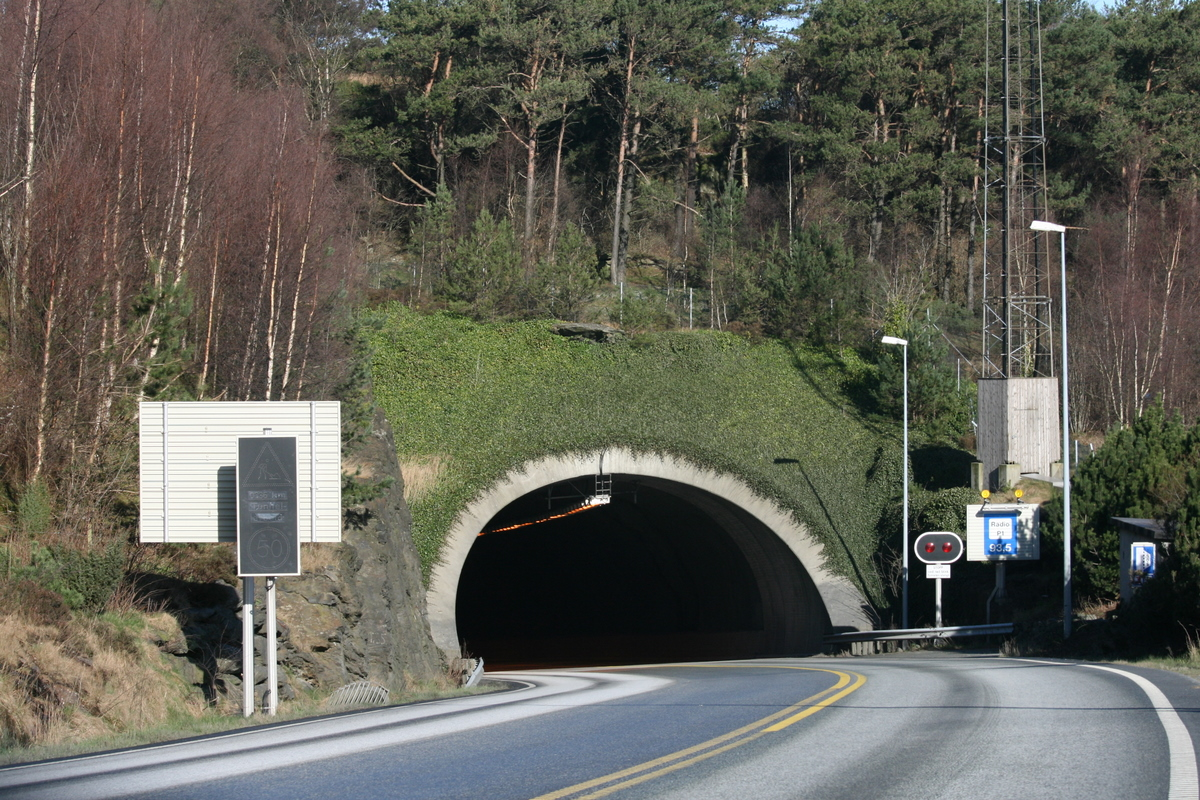
New road heritage: the Byfjord Tunnel in Rogaland, opened in 1992

The National Protection Plan for Roads, Bridges, and Road-Related Cultural Heritage (Norwegian: Nasjonal verneplan for veger, bruer og vegrelaterte kulturminner) was published by the Norwegian Public Roads Administration in 2002 in the volume Vegvalg (Road Selection). The plan contains road heritage in Norway dating from 1537 to 1999 that has been owned or used by the state. (National heritage from before 1537 is automatically protected under the Cultural Heritage Act of 1978.) In addition to roads and bridges, some of the Public Roads Administration's own machinery, equipment, and buildings are included in the plan. However, no ferries are included in the plan, and streets, boulevards, stepping stones, and winter roads are not systematically registered.

In 1997, the Public Roads Administration was ordered by the Ministry of Transport and Communications to prepare a protection plan in cooperation with the Norwegian Directorate for Cultural Heritage. Over 1,000 road heritage sites were registered and mapped, and 97 historical road milieus and 173 individual structures were included in the plan. The plan was issued in book form and it is available for free online.

The protection plan was followed by three conservation decisions. On August 24, 2007 the Directorate for Cultural Heritage applied protection to 19 road-related buildings and building complexes. On April 17, 2008 the directorate applied protection to 40 bridges that were in the plan, as well as one tunnel and a roundabout. On December 21, 2009 the directorate applied protection to 40 roads in the plan.
