= Norwegian National Road 13 =

Highway in Rogaland-Vestland, Norway

National Road 13
- Bokmål: Riksvei 13; Nynorsk: Riksveg 13
- Location in Western Norway

Route information
- Maintained by Norwegian Public Roads Administration

Major junctions
- North end: Sogndalsfjøra, Vestland
- Rv5 – Sogndalsfjøra – Vik, Sogn; E16 east – Nedre Vinjo; E16 west – Bergen; Rv7 – Eidfjord; E134 west – Etnesjøen; E134 east – Haukeli – Hjelmelandsvågen; E39 – Stavanger
- South end: Stavanger, Rogaland

Location
- Country: Norway

Highway system
- Roads in Norway; National Roads; County Roads
← Rv9	→ Rv15

National Road 13 (Norwegian: Riksvei 13, Rv13) is a national road which runs from the town of Stavanger in Rogaland county to the village of Sogndalsfjøra in Vestland county. The route is 449.9 kilometers (279.6 mi) long and runs south–north through Rogaland and Vestland counties, following a more inland path than the European route E39 highway.

Prior to 2019, the northern terminus of the road was at the village of Balestrand, but in 2019, the section of Norwegian County Road 55 from Balestrand to Sogndalsfjøra was added to National Road 13, extending it all the way to Sogndalsfjøra. In 2020, a new tunnel was opened between Stavanger and Tau, Ryfylke Tunnel, the world's deepest public road tunnel. National Road 13 was then rerouted through this tunnel, making it end in Stavanger instead of Sandnes. The road between Tau and Sandnes which has a ferry crossing (Oanes to Lauvika across the Høgsfjorden) became a county road.

== Route description ==
Historically, Rv13 also included the road between the village of Balestrand to the town of Førde, now known as county road 613. Currently, Rv13 begins at Sogndalsfjøra and ends in the city of Stavanger. National Road 13 has two ferry crossings: Vangsnes to Dragsviki (across the Sognefjorden) and Nesvik to Hjelmelandsvågen (across the Jøsenfjorden). Parts of the road have been designated as National Tourist Routes.

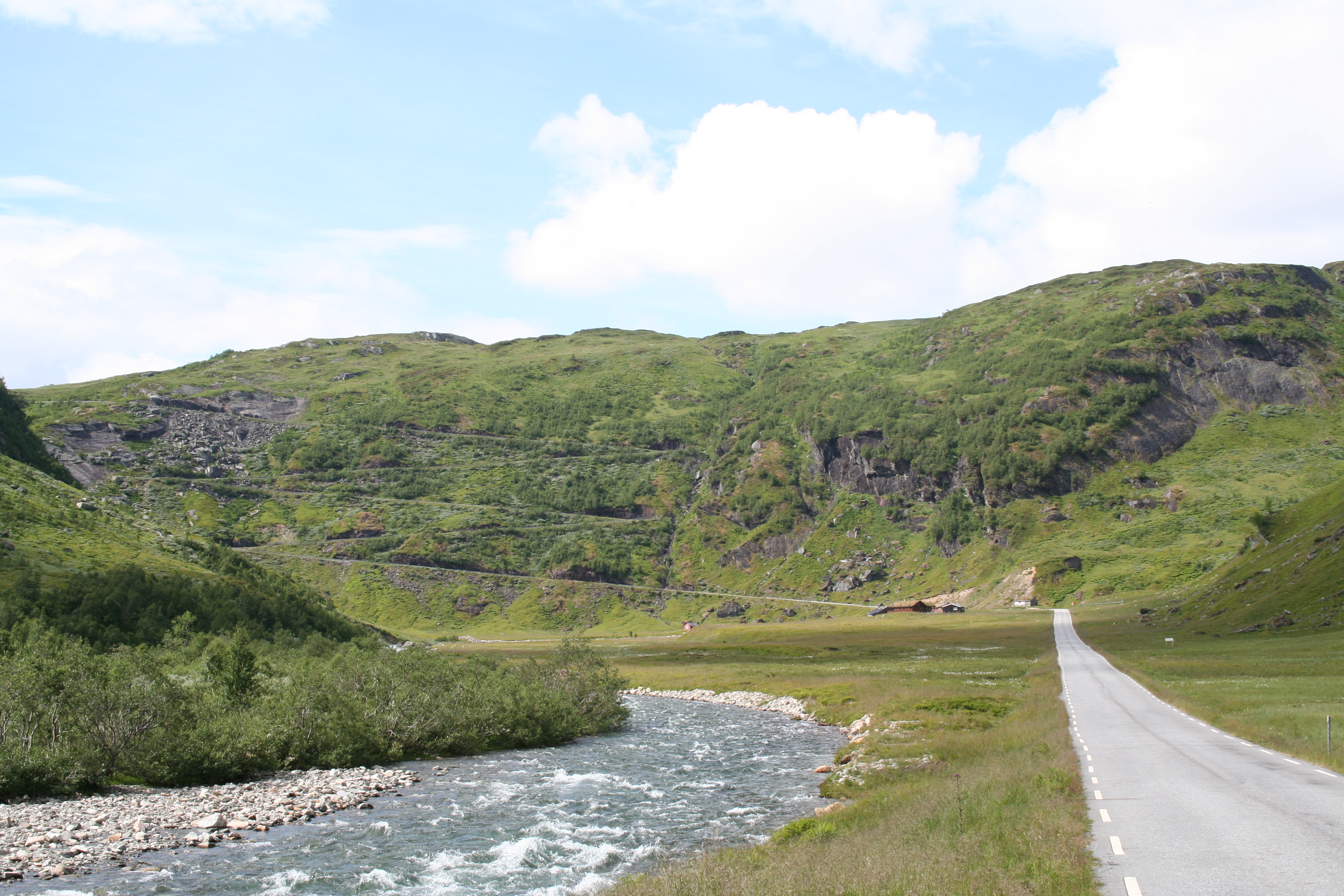
View of the road in Kvassdalen

There are several tunnels on this highway; the longest of which are the Ryfylke Tunnel (14.4-kilometre (8.9 mi)), Hundvåg Tunnel, Tunsberg Tunnel, Vallavik Tunnel, and Fresvik Tunnel. The Hardanger Bridge was completed in 2013, and it carries this highway across the large Hardangerfjorden.

There are signposted concurrencies with the European route E134 between Horda and Skare, and the European route E16 between Vossevangen and Vinje. The E134 concurrency adds the Røldal and Horda spiral tunnels to the total.

After the construction of the Hardanger Bridge, the Jondal Tunnel and the Mælefjell Tunnel, National Road 13 between Skare and Voss is increasingly used by cars. Parts of the road in this area are so narrow that heavy vehicles cannot meet everywhere, so they often have to reverse to a wider part of the road so that they can pass each other. Having a trailer or caravan is not advised in this section. The increasing amount of traffic has made driving more difficult, so the government has decided to rebuild some of the narrow parts between Skare and the Hardanger Bridge before 2035.
