= Norwegian County Road 5096 =

Road in Vestland county, Norway

Coordinates: 60°29′35″N 07°08′13″E

County Road 5096
- Bokmål: Fylkesvei 5096; Nynorsk: Fylkesveg 5096
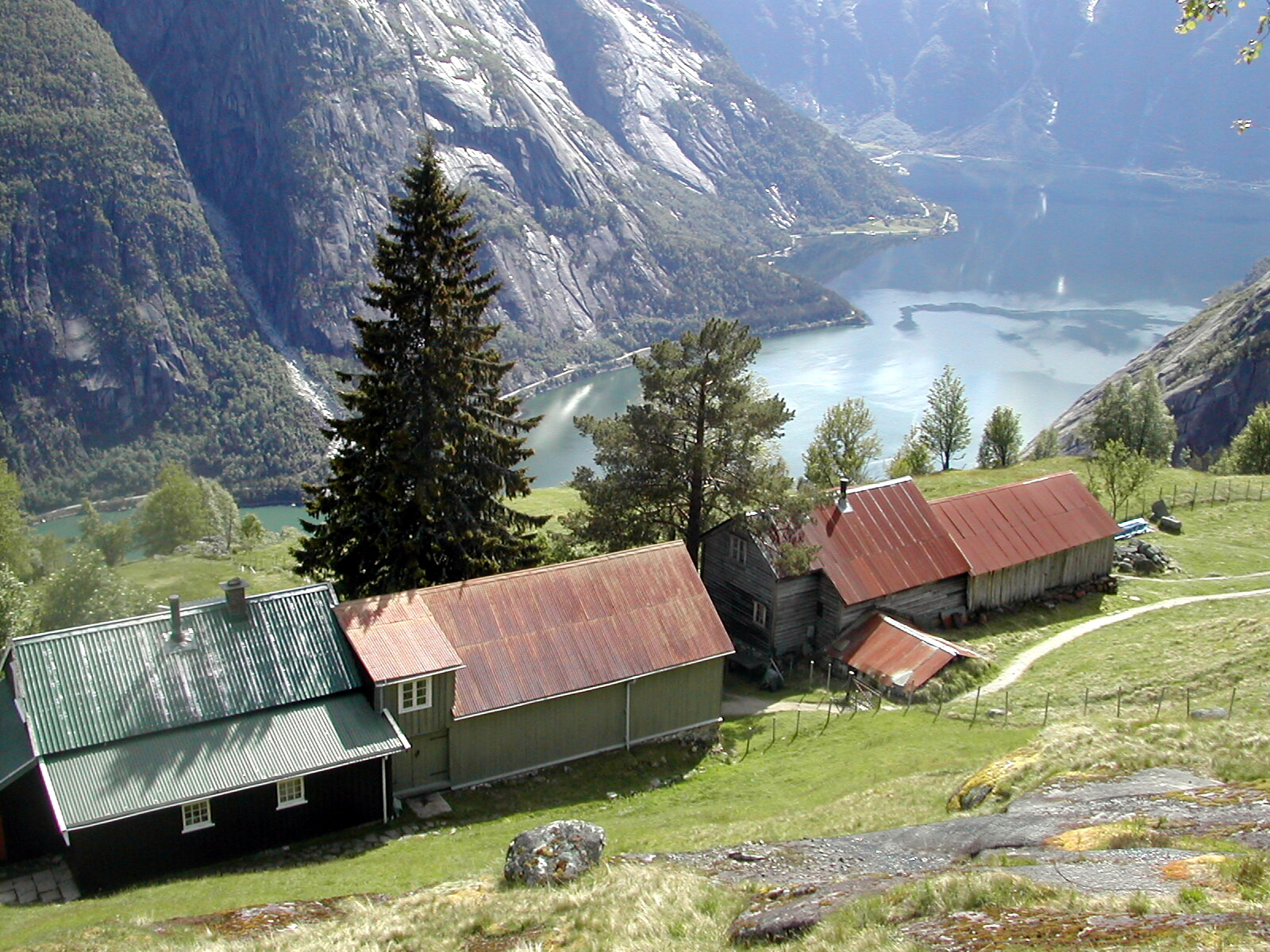

Route information
- Maintained by Western Norway Public Roads Administration
- Length: 9.2 km (5.7 mi)

Major junctions
- West end: Rv7 at Eidfjord
- West end: Sima Valley

Location
- Country: Norway
- Counties: Vestland
- Major cities: Eidfjord Municipality

Highway system
- Roads in Norway; National Roads; County Roads

County Road 5096 (Norwegian: Fylkesvei 5096) is a 9.2 kilometers (5.7 mi) long county road in Eidfjord Municipality in Vestland county, Norway. The road heads northeast from the village of Eidfjord. Prior to 2020, the road was called County Road 103. It was changed in 2020 when Vestland county was created.

The road branches off from Norwegian National Road 7 at Eidfjord and runs along the south shore of the Simadal Fjord. After passing the Sima Hydroelectric Power Station at the mouth of the Sima River below Kjeåsen, the road continues into the Sima Valley, where it terminates. The road is 9.2 kilometers (5.7 mi) long.
