= Djønno Tunnel =

Road tunnel in Norway

- Interactive map of Djønno Tunnel

Overview
- Location: Vestland, Norway
- Coordinates: 60°28′58″N 6°49′06″E
- Status: In use
- Route: Fv302
- Start: Vallaviki, Ulvik Municipality
- End: Kammen, Ulvik Municipality

Operation
- Opened: August 22, 1981
- Operator: Norwegian Public Roads Administration
- Character: Automotive

Technical
- Length: 603 meters (1,978 ft)

The Djønno Tunnel (Norwegian: Djønnotunnelen) is a road tunnel in Ulvik Municipality in Vestland county, Norway. The 603-meter (1,978 ft) long tunnel is located on Norwegian County Road 302, just southwest of the Vallaviki farm. The tunnel was opened in 1981 to create a road connection along the Eid Fjord to Djønno, which was previously accessible only by boat. The branch of the Vallavik Tunnel connecting to the Hardanger Bridge passes directly over the Djønno Tunnel.
