= Norwegian County Road 5378 =

Road in Vestland county, Norway

County Road 5378

Route information
- Length: 6.6 km (4.1 mi)

Major junctions
- East end: Fv572 at Vallaviki, Ulvik Municipality
- West end: Djønno, Ullensvang Municipality

Location
- Country: Norway
- Counties: Vestland

Highway system
- Roads in Norway; National Roads; County Roads

Norwegian County Road 5378 (Norwegian: Fylkesvei 5378) is a county road in Ulvik Municipality and Ullensvang Municipality in Vestland county, Norway.

The road branches off from Norwegian County Road 572 at Vallaviki and continues along the west side of the Eid Fjord before terminating in Djønno. Along the way, it passes through the 603-meter (1,978 ft) Djønno Tunnel. It is also named Tjoflotvegen 'Tjoflot Road' along its course in Ulvik. At the end of the county road in Djønno, a smaller unnamed road continues along the coast to Tjoflot.

The road was re-numbered in 2019 because Hordaland and Sogn og Fjordane counties were scheduled to merge and there were county roads in both counties with the same number. This road previously was County Road 302.
