= Osa Fjord =

Fjord in Vestland, Norway

Osa Fjord (English) Osafjorden (Norwegian)
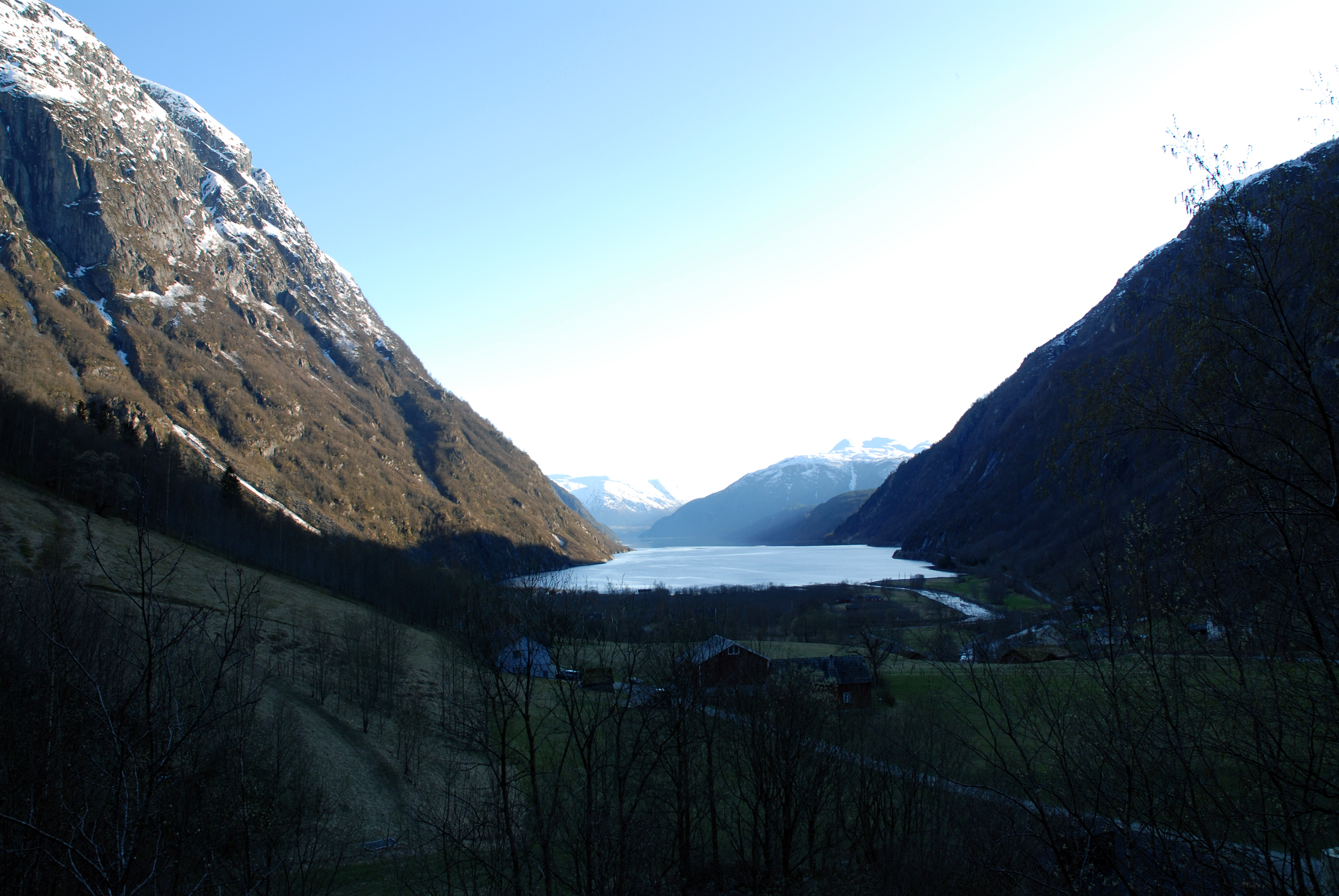
- View of the fjord
- Interactive map of the fjord
- Location: Vestland county, Norway
- Coordinates: 60.53346°N 6.94126°E
- Type: Fjord
- Primary inflows: Ulvik Fjord
- Primary outflows: Hardanger Fjord
- Basin countries: Norway
- Max. length: 13 kilometres (8.1 mi)
- Max. width: 1.5 kilometres (0.93 mi)
- Average depth: 302 metres (991 ft)
- Settlements: Osa

The Osa Fjord (English) or Osafjorden (Norwegian) is a branch of the Eid Fjord and the Hardanger Fjord fully located within Ulvik Municipality in Vestland county, Norway. The fjord is 13 kilometres (8.1 mi) long, with a maximum depth of 302 metres (991 ft) at its mouth, and it runs northeast from its mouth between Bruravik and Bagnsnes to the head of the fjord at the small village of Osa.

On the west side, the Ulvik Fjord extends to the north to the municipal center of Ulvik. The outermost part of the Osa Fjord is also known as the Bagns Fjord (Norwegian: Bagnsfjorden), named after the headland where the fjord starts.

At Bruravik there was formerly a ferry connection across the Eid Fjord to Brimnes in Eidfjord Municipality. Norwegian County Road 572 runs along the west side of the Osa Fjord starting at Bruravik before it enters the Ulvik Fjord and continues to Ulvik. At Ulvik it intersects with Norwegian County Road 5374, which again leads to the west side of the Osa Fjord and continues to Osa. The east side of the fjord has no road connections, and the only settlements there are the Bolstad farms near the mouth of the fjord.

== See also ==
- List of Norwegian fjords
