= Ringøy =

Village in Ullensvang Municipality, Norway

- Village
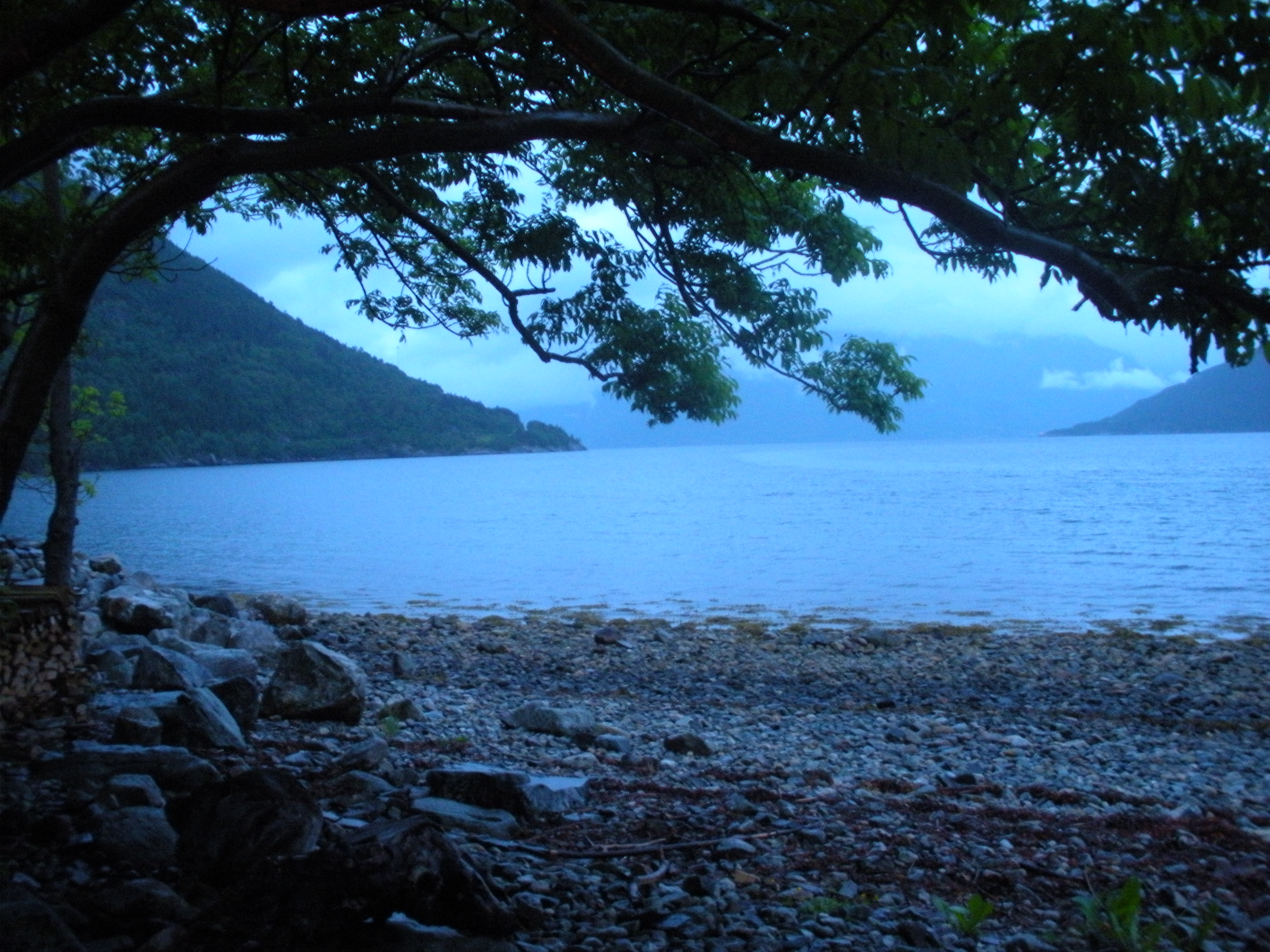
- Campsite at Ringøy
- Interactive map of Ringøy
- Coordinates: 60.43889°N 6.77916°E
- Country: Norway
- Region: Western Norway
- County: Hordaland
- District: Hardanger
- Municipality: Ullensvang Municipality
- Elevation: 39 m (128 ft)
- Time zone: UTC+01:00 (CET)
  - Summer (DST): UTC+02:00 (CEST)
- Post Code: 5780 Kinsarvik

Ringøy is a small village in Ullensvang Municipality in Vestland county, Norway. The settlement lies on the south side of the Eid Fjord, an inner branch of the Hardanger Fjord. The village is located about 10 kilometers (6.2 mi) north of the village of Kinsarvik and about 20 kilometers (12 mi) east of the village of Eidfjord in the neighboring Eidfjord Municipality. There is a campsite next to the fjord in the village.

== Transportation ==
The ferry quay at Ringøy served the ferry connection to the village of Ulvik until 1938, when the quay on the south side of the fjord was relocated to Brimnes. The Hardanger Bridge crosses the fjord, just north of Ringøy. The bridge was built in 2013. The Norwegian National Road 13 passes through Ringøy on its way to the brige.
