= Jorunn Hanto-Haugse =

Jorunn Hanto-Haugse is a Norwegian orchardist, comic strip author, and illustrator.

Hanto-Haugse grew up on the Utitun farm in Djønno. She received a bachelor's degree in art from the University of Central England in Birmingham and she also studied premodern visual rhetoric at the University of Bergen. As an artist, she has had independent exhibitions in Bergen and Vadsø, and she has also exhibited in New York, Liverpool, and Seoul.

She became well known for her comic strips Reveland, Reform 94, and Skulen, which are all written in Nynorsk. Her comic strips are regularly published in Norsk Barneblad, the street newspaper Megafon, and Hordaland. They also previously regularly appeared in the newspaper EON and in the magazine Utdanning. They are also reprinted by Verdens Gang, Bergens Tidende, Larsons Gale Verden, Pondus, and the National Center for Nynorsk in Education.

Since 2014, Hanto-Haugse has also grown fruit at the Utitun farm in Djønno.
