= Sima Valley =

River valley in Vestland, Norway

Sima Valley Simadal
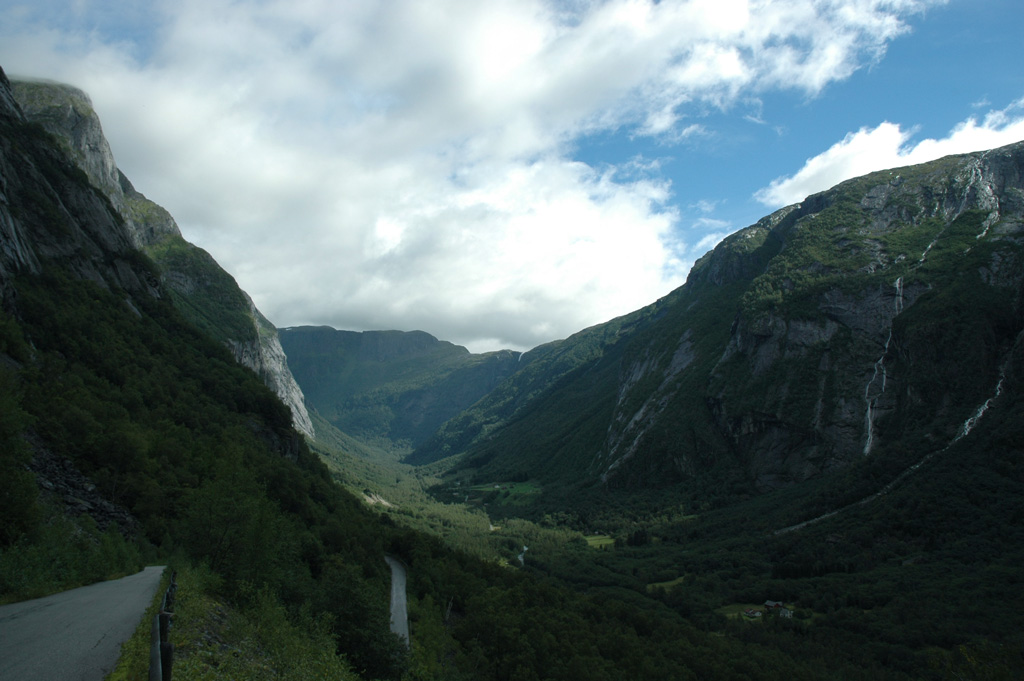
- The Sima Valley seen from the road to Kjeåsen
- Floor elevation: 48 m (157 ft)
- Length: 8 kilometers (5.0 mi) E-W
- Width: 1 kilometer (0.62 mi)

Geology
- Type: River valley

Geography
- Location: Vestland, Norway
- Coordinates: 60°30′02″N 07°09′37″E
- Rivers: Sima River

Location
- Interactive map of Sima Valley; Simadal

The Sima Valley (English) or Simadal (Norwegian) is a river valley in Eidfjord Municipality in Vestland county, Norway. The 8-kilometre (5.0 mi) long valley begins below Lake Rembesdal, with an elevation of 905 meters (2,969 ft), which is one of the sources of the Sima River. The valley then runs west along the river to the Sima Hydroelectric Power Station at the head of the Simadal Fjord, where the river empties into the fjord. Norwegian County Road 5096 runs through part of the valley and then continues along the south side of the fjord.

The Sima Valley is known for its waterfalls, including Rembesdal Falls (Rembesdalsfossen) and Skykkjedal Falls (Skykkjedalsfossen). It suffered catastrophic floods in 1893 and 1937. The valley had a population of 10 in 2023. The Kjeåsen mountain farm is located in the mountain above the valley.
