= Sima (river) =

River in Vestland, Norway

Location
- Country: Norway
- County: Vestland
- Municipalities: Eidfjord Municipality

Physical characteristics
- Source: Hardanger Glacier
  - location: Eidfjord Municipality
  - coordinates: 60°33′56″N 7°19′48″E
  - elevation: 1,020 metres (3,350 ft)
- Mouth: Simadalsfjorden
  - location: Eidfjord Municipality
  - coordinates: 60°29′49″N 7°08′17″E
  - elevation: 0 metres (0 ft)
- Length: 29.64 km (18.42 mi)
- Basin size: 125 km^{2} (48 sq mi)
- Discharge
  - average: 8.86 m^{3}/s (313 cu ft/s)

The Sima is a river in Eidfjord Municipality in Vestland county, Norway. The river is 29.64 kilometers (18.42 mi) long, and it has a drainage basin of 125 square kilometers (48 sq mi) and an average discharge of 8.86 cubic meters per second (313 cu ft/s).

The river has its source on the west side of the Hardanger Glacier, at a proglacial lake called Demmevatn at an elevation of 1,290 meters (4,230 ft). The river then flows west from Lake Rembesdal (Rembesdalsvatn), with an elevation of 905 meters (2,969 ft), into the deep Sima Valley and past the former 272-meter (892 ft) high Rembesdal Falls (Rembesdalsfossen), which is now dry because of hydroelectric plant infrastructure. In the Sima Valley the river is joined by the Skytjedal River (Skytjedalselva), a left tributary known for Skytjefossen, a 300-meter (980 ft) high waterfall. The river continues west until its mouth at the head of the Simadal Fjord.

Together with the nearby Bjoreio River to the south, the Sima River has been developed for power production at the Sima Hydroelectric Power Station. The power station is located in the mountains below Kjeåsen on the north side of the Simadal Fjord.
