= Bruravik–Brimnes Ferry =

Ferry service in Norway

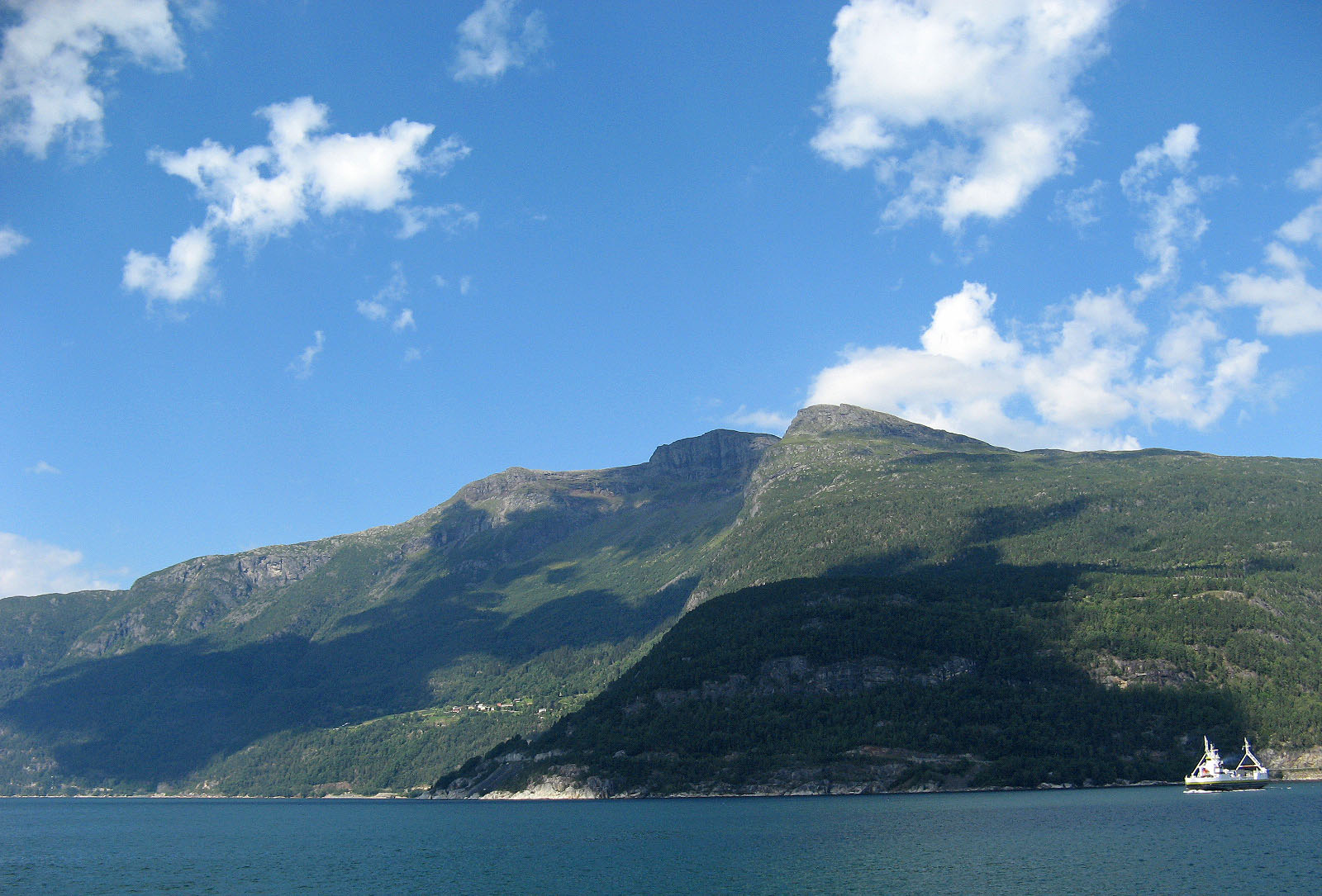
The fjord and ferry seen from the Brimnes ferry quay

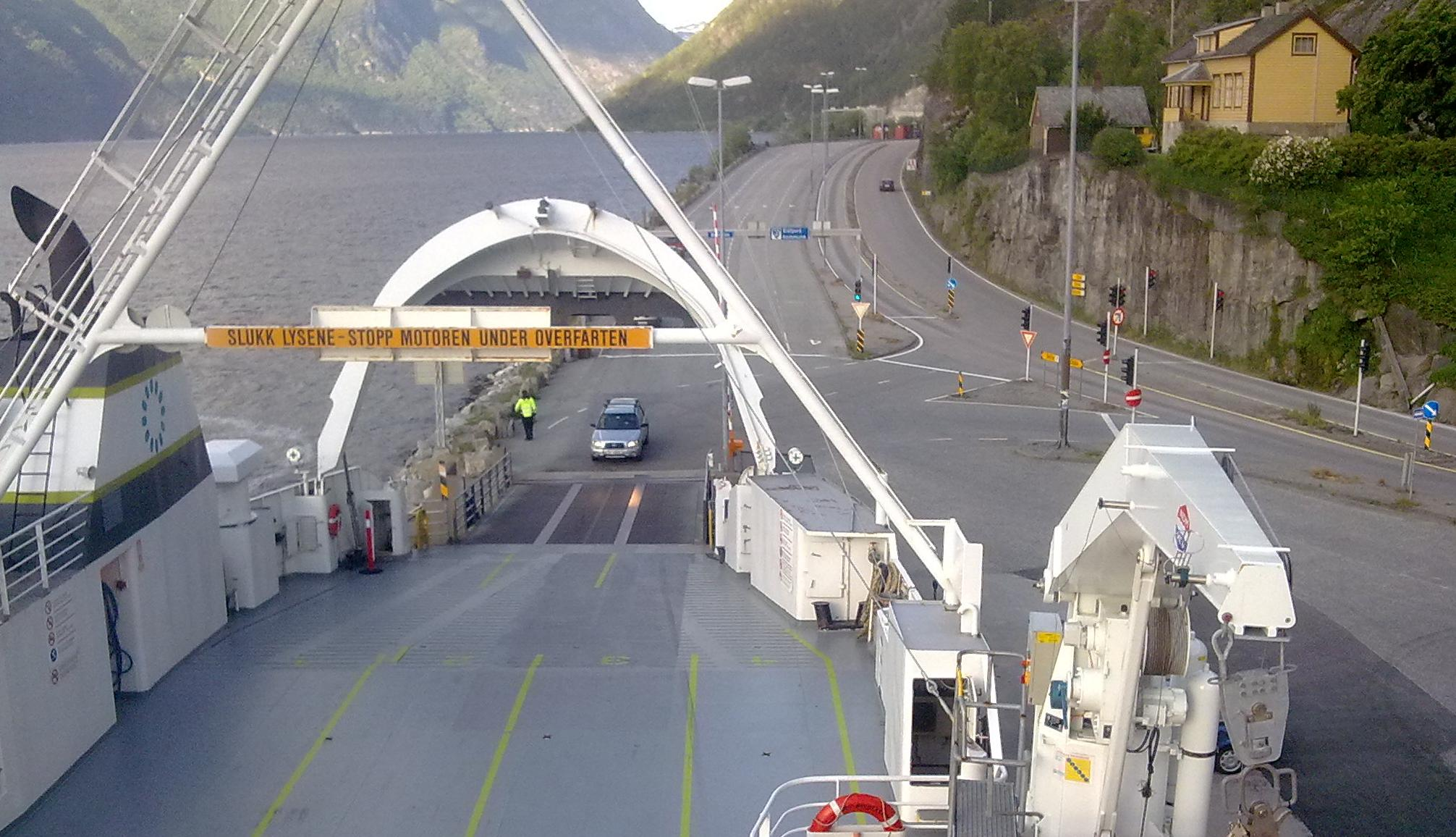
The Brimnes ferry quay seen from MF Melderskin

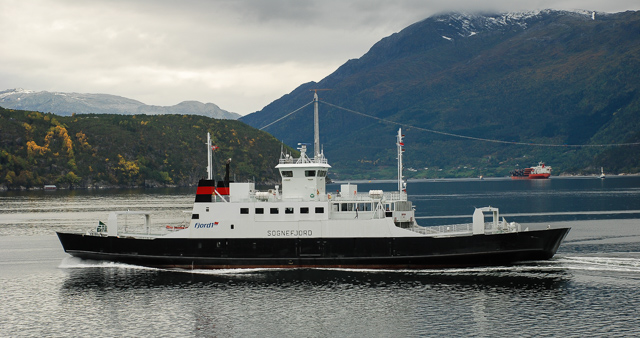
MF Sognefjord en route between Bruravik and Brimnes in 2012. In the background the Hardanger Bridge is under construction.

The Bruravik–Brimnes Ferry was a Norwegian ferry connection across the Hardanger Fjord between Bruravik in Ulvik Municipality and Brimnes in Eidfjord Municipality. The ferry connected Norwegian County Road 7 and Norwegian National Road 13, and before it was discontinued it was operated by the company Fjord1 and served by MF Sogn with up to three departures per hour. The crossing lasted about 12 minutes. In the summer of 2013 the route was also served by MF Sognefjord.

== History ==
The route was served by HSD (later Tide Sjø) from its opening in 1934 until 2011. In 2011, Fjord 1 won a tender and took over the ferry route. In 2013 the ferry connection was replaced by the Hardanger Bridge, which opened on August 17 that year.

From the 1930s onward, road construction in the inner Hardanger Fjord progressively reduced the distance covered by the ferry:

- 1934–1937: the ferry connected Ulvik and Ringøy
- 1938–1940: the ferry connected Ulvik and Brimnes
- 1951–1976: ferry service was resumed between Ulvik and Brimnes
- 1976–2013: the ferry connected Bruravik and Brimnes
- August 17, 2013: the ferry was discontinued and replaced by the Hardanger Bridge

== Ferries ==
The following ferries served the route:

- 1952–1959: MK Kinsarvik
- 1953–1957 and 1969: MF Folgefonn
- 1959–1976 (not in 1966): MF Osafjord
- 1966 (summer route): MF Melderskin
- 1967 and 1968 (summer route): MF Rosendal
- 1971–1972: MF Vikingen
- 1986: MF Eidfjord
- 1995–2007: MF Etne
- 2007–2010: MF Melderskin
- 2007–2010 (summer route): MF Bømlo
- 2011–2013: MF Sogn and MF Sognefjord
- Summer 2013: MF Gulen and MF Svanøy (for a few days in August 2013 as a replacement for MF Sogn)
