= Tjoflot =

Village in Ullensvang Municipality, Norway

- Village
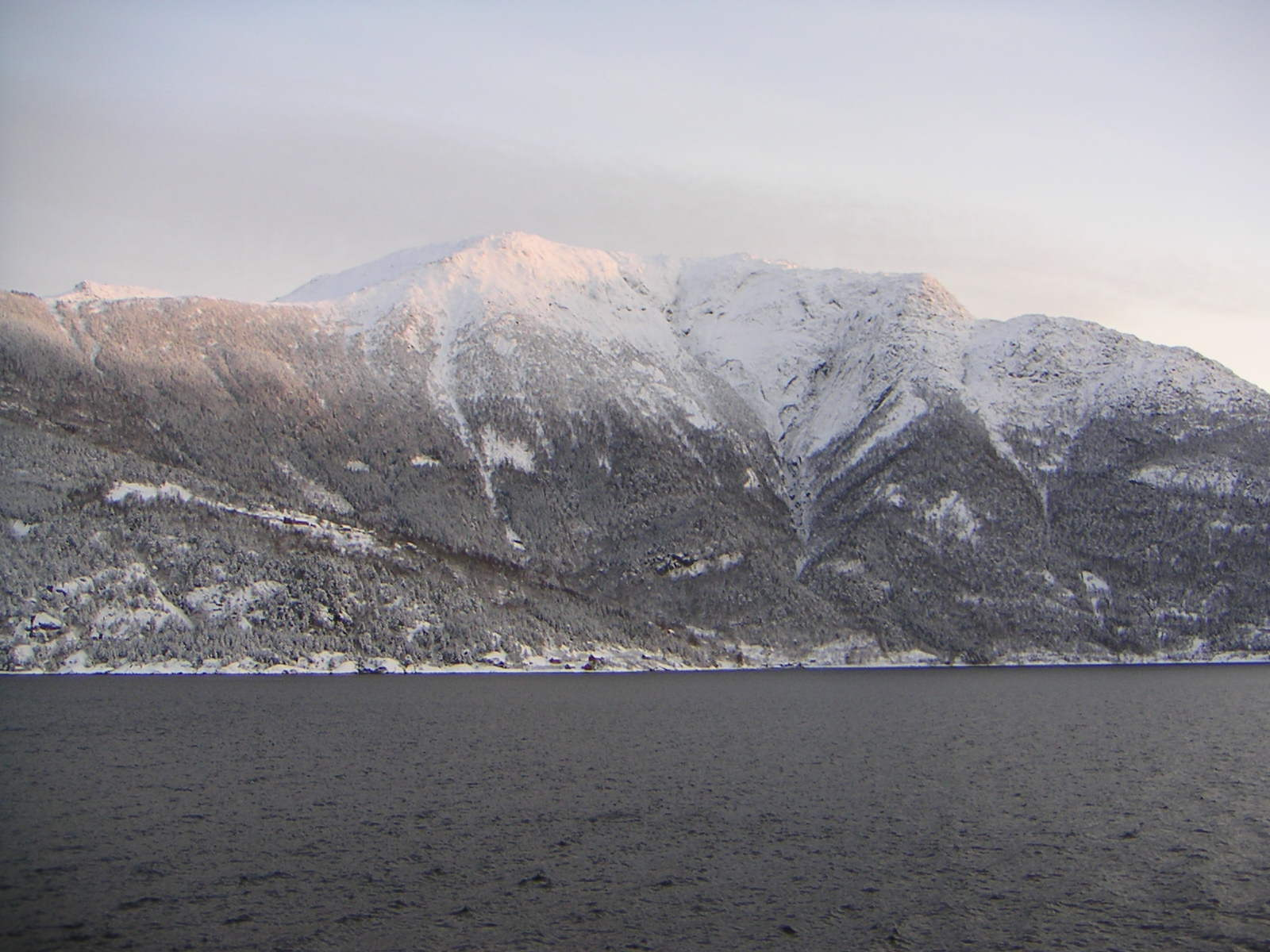
- Tjoflot and Oksen in the winter. View from the ferry between Kvanndal and Utne.
- Interactive map of Tjoflot
- Coordinates: 60.45066°N 6.64006°E
- Country: Norway
- Region: Western Norway
- County: Vestland
- District: Hardanger
- Municipality: Voss Municipality
- Elevation: 183 m (600 ft)
- Time zone: UTC+01:00 (CET)
  - Summer (DST): UTC+02:00 (CEST)
- Post Code: 5719 Vallavik

Tjoflot is a village in Voss Municipality in Vestland county, Norway. The village is located near the Hardangerfjord on the Oksen Peninsula, about 10 kilometres (6.2 mi) south of the village of Granvin. The 1,241-meter (4,072 ft) mountain Oksen is located immediately to the northeast of the village. The village obtained a road connection in 1984 (before that time, it was only accessible by boat along the fjord).

== History ==
The village was located in Ullensvang Municipality for a long time. In 1913, it became part of Kinsarvik Municipality. On 1 January 2020, the Tjoflot area was transferred from Ullensvang Municipality to the newly-enlarged Voss Municipality.

=== Name ===
The origin of the village name Tjoflot, as the toponym is written today, is uncertain. Descendants from Ytrabødn (also known as Garen or Erlingsgarden), the main farm in the settlement, usually write their surname as Tjoflot or Tjoflaat.

Genealogical records show that the toponym was previously spelled Þiodaflar in 1378, Thiodhaflar in 1427, Tiodaaflaa in 1463, Tyofflo in 1521, and Thioflodt in 1667. The locals say that Tjod (or Þjod) means 'people' and that the name originates from the location of an old assembly site at a level area where such an assembly could be held.

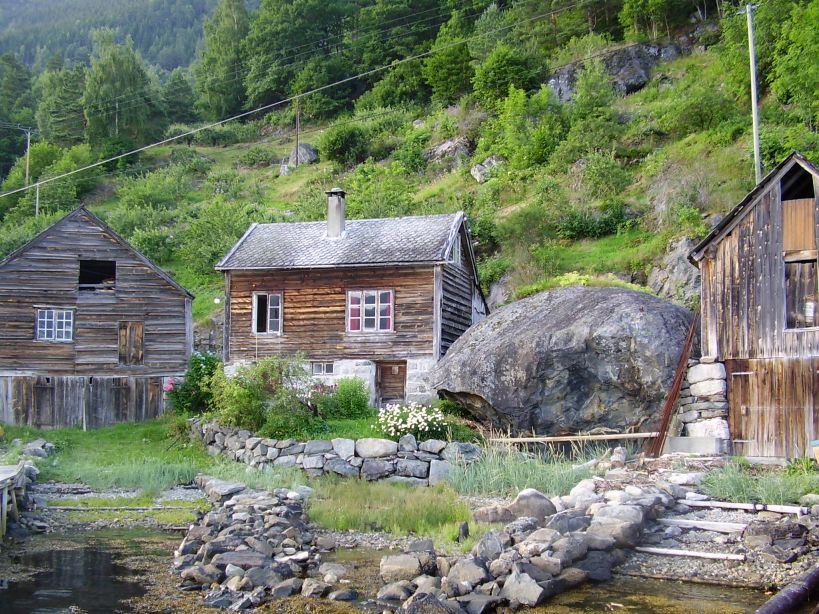
The boathouse area inside the bay at Tjoflot

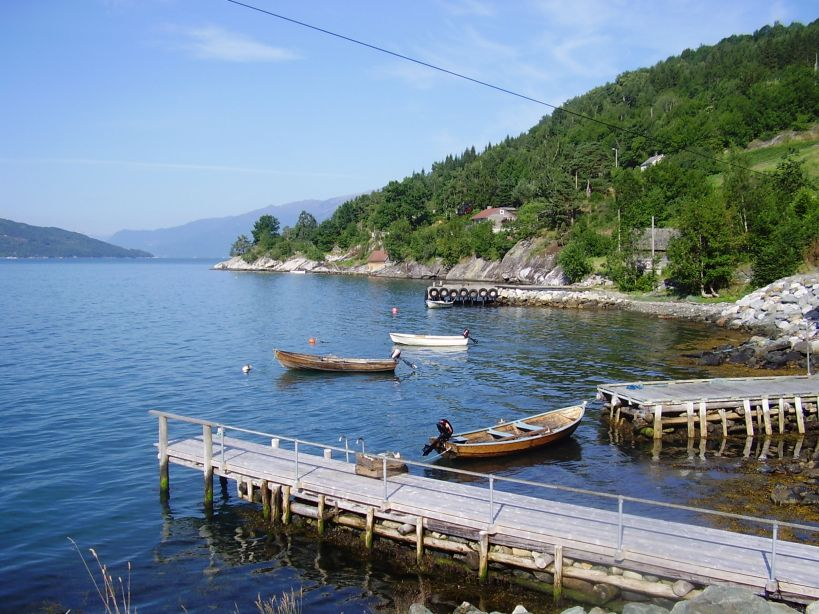
View from Tjoflot across Samla Fjord in Hardanger Fjord in July 2006

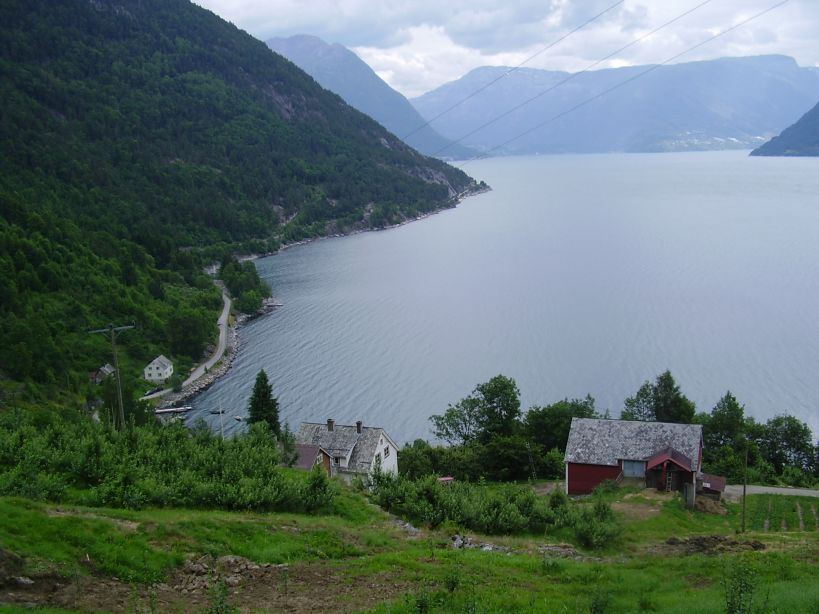
View from Tjoflot toward Kinsarvik and Lofthus in Hardanger Fjord. In the foreground the fjord splits into the Sørfjorden and Eid Fjord.

== Notable people ==
Notable people that were born or lived in Tjoflot include:

- Nils Tjoflot (1865–1898), a violinist
