= Halldor O. Opedal =

Norwegian teacher and folklorist

Halldor Olson Opedal (May 26, 1895 – January 17, 1986) was a Norwegian teacher and folklorist from Lofthus in the Hardanger district, in Ullensvang Municipality.

Opedal was trained as a teacher and worked in Tyssedal for 37 years. He traveled extensively in the area and collected folk tradition and dialect material from the Hardanger countryside by listening to old people who were skilled at telling stories. His two largest series of books were titled Makter og menneske: folkeminne ifrå Hardanger (Power and People: Folk Tradition from Hardanger, 22 volumes) and Folk or gamal tid: folkeminne ifrå Hardanger (Folk from Old Times: Folk Tradition from Hardanger, eight volumes). Opedal also wrote a description of the people at the Kjeåsen mountain farm in the Simadal Fjord titled Kjeåsfolket i Hardanger. Soga om eit utkantfolk (The People of Kjeåsen in Hardanger. The Story of an Unknown People, 1980), which was also translated into Swedish. Opedal's total book production runs to 7,500 pages.

Opedal received the King's Medal of Merit in gold in 1961. In 1975, he was awarded the Arts Council Norway Honorary Award for local history in recognition of his work with folk culture in Hardanger. In 1975, Opedal created the Halldor O. Opedal Fund for Norwegian Language Development with a capital of NOK 600,000, and he established the Halldor O. Opedal Fund for Charitable Purposes, with a capital of NOK 2.8 million to benefit cultural aims in Hardanger.

Opedal died in Ullensvang Municipality in 1986. A bronze bust of Opedal, created in 1995 by Oddmund Raudberget, is displayed in the center of Lofthus today.
