= Rannveig Djønne =

Norwegian folk musician (born 1974)

Rannveig Djønne (born March 3, 1974) is a Norwegian folk musician from Djønno in Ullensvang Municipality (now part of Voss Municipality) in Norway. Djønne plays diatonic button accordion and is a graduate of the Ole Bull Academy in Vossavangen.

She released her first CD in December 2008. The CD is called Spelferd heim – slåtter frå Hardanger og Voss på durspel (Spelferd Heim: Tunes from Hardanger and Voss for Button Accordion). Other performers with her on the CD are Inger Elisabeth Aarvik, Arngunn Timenes Bell, Anders Hall, Kim André Rysstad, Lajla Renate Buer Storli, and Tuva Syvertsen. They perform music based on melodies by Nils Tjoflot and others, as well as music that Djønne wrote herself.

In 2023 she performed live in Lofthus in Hardanger with the Norwegian prog-rock band Panzerpappa. The concert was filmed and recorded and released in May 2024 on Bandcamp as the live album Skjeringspunkt ("Intersection"). It was available as an audio CD, and as a digital download with video of the concert. The performance was dedicated to genre-bending Swedish accordionist Lars Hollmer.

As of 2024 Djønne teaches traditional button accordion at the online Folk Music Academy.

== Works ==
- 2008: (with various artists) Spelferd heim – slåttar frå Hardanger og Voss på durspel, Djønno Records
- 2012: (with Annlaug Børsheim) Toras Dans – Populærmusikk Frå Hardanger, Fivreld
- 2024: (with Panzerpappa) Skjeringspunkt, CD live concert album; digital release includes video.
