= Simadal Fjord =

Fjord in Vestland, Norway

- Simadalsfjorden (Norwegian)
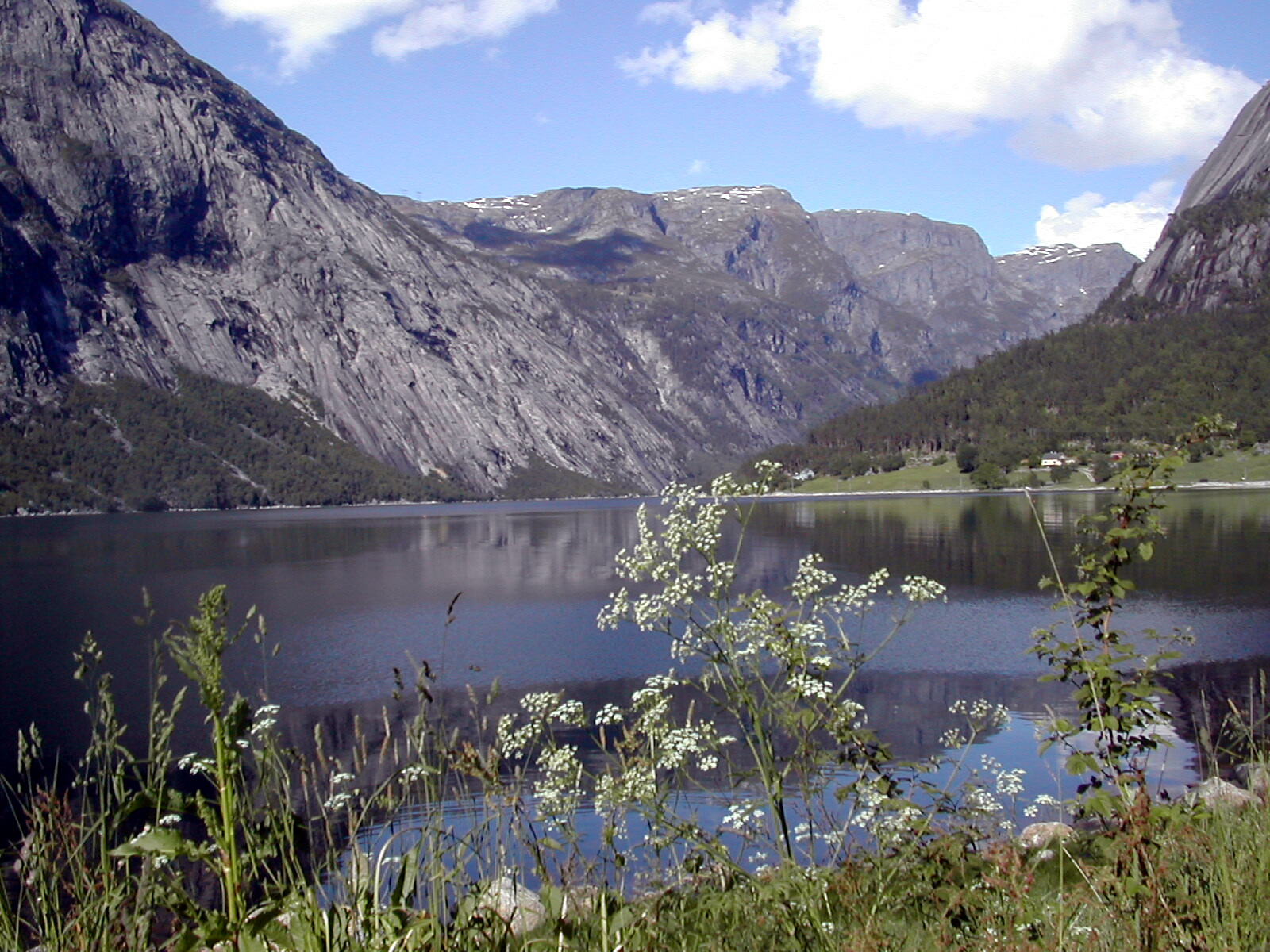
- View of the fjord
- Interactive map of the fjord
- Location: Vestland county, Norway
- Coordinates: 60.48834°N 7.09361°E
- Type: Fjord
- Basin countries: Norway
- Max. length: 5 kilometres (3.1 mi)

The Simadal Fjord (English) or Simadalsfjorden (Norwegian) is a branch of the Eid Fjord in Eidfjord Municipality in Vestland, Norway. The Simadal Fjord is the innermost branch of the Hardanger Fjord. It is 5 kilometers (3.1 mi) long and extends east from its mouth between Blurnes and Eikenes to the head of the fjord at the Sima Valley.

The fjord is surrounded by high and steep mountains reaching elevations up to 1,500 meters (4,900 ft). The Kjeåsen mountain farm lies on the mountain slope north of the mouth of the fjord. Below Kjeåsen is the Sima Hydroelectric Power Station, which has its outlet into the fjord. Norwegian County Road 103 runs along the south side of the fjord and continues into the Sima Valley.
