= Tjoflaat =

Tjoflaat is a Norwegian surname. In 2017, there were 13 people with this surname in Norway.

The name is a Danish spelling for descendants from the Ytrabødn farm (also known as Garen or Erlingsgarden), the main farm in the village of Tjoflot in Norway's Hardanger district. Genealogical records show that the toponym that the surname is based on was previously spelled Þiodaflar in 1378, Thiodhaflar in 1427, Tiodaaflaa in 1463, Tyofflo in 1521, and Thioflodt in 1667.

== See also ==
Tjoflaat, a variant spelling of Tjoflaat.
