= Nils Tjoflot =

Norwegian violinist (1865–1898)

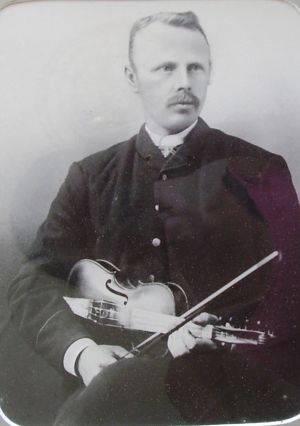
- Nils Ellingson Tjoflot with his third instrument, a Samnanger fiddle, photographed during the first competition held by the Western Norwegian Association in 1896
- Born: October 13, 1865
- Died: July 11, 1898 (aged 32)
- Occupation: Violinist

Nils Ellingsson Tjoflot (October 13, 1865 – July 11, 1898) was a Norwegian violinist from Tjoflot in Ullensvang Municipality in Norway's Hardanger district.

== Life ==
Tjoflot was born at the Ytrabødn farm in Tjoflot, the son of Elling Nilsson Tjoflot (1819–1870) and Barbro Endresdatter Folkedal from Trones (1837–1905). Nils was an only child, and his father died when he was five years old. There had not been any previous violinists in the family, but there were many violinists in Tjoflot and Nils was motivated to perform alongside them. He received a violin from his mother when he was seven years old. The instrument was probably made by Hans Eikanes, and it was probably Eikanes that also taught Tjoflot to play the Hardanger fiddle. Tjoflot was later taught by Olav Håstabø from Løflaten in Kvanndal, and then by Ola Mosafinn.

Nils Tjoflot was a talented player that was known throughout Hardanger and participated in folk music competitions held by the Western Norwegian Association (Norwegian: Vestmannalaget); the first such competition was held in 1896, and the second in 1897. Tjoflot often played for dances at weddings and at other events around the Hardanger Fjord. He played at his first wedding at the age of 10, and he also played for tourists visiting the Hardanger Fjord. The folklorist Rikard Berge mentioned Nils Tjoflot as one of the most talented folk musicians in Hardanger in his article "Spelemenner" (Folk Musicians).

Together with several other folk musicians from the area, Tjoflot was a member of the Western Norwegian Association.

== Death ==
Tjoflot died in a shipwreck in 1898 when he was only 32 years old. On Sunday, July 10, 1898, he traveled with his custom-built sailboat to Granvin Municipality. He was frequently in Granvin, where he had many friends and acquaintances from his confirmation, including many that played fiddle. Both Severin Kjerland and Nils Nilsson Eida were admirers of Nils. This Sunday there were two men with him in the boat, Endre Sjurson Kvammen and Jon Tjoflot. In Granvin, Nils Tjoflot played at a barn dance, and the dance lasted until late in the night.

It was already morning when the three had to travel back on the sailboat to Tjoflot. Nils sat in the bow with his fiddle and Endre was at the helm. Nils is reported to have stated, "We're sailing under the Norwegian flag." He played the folk dance tune "Blåmannen," which he had learned from Håstabø. Soon they were far out in the fjord, and the music could no longer heard by those on the land. Suddenly, they turned against the wind so that the boat was sailing close-hauled near Røynstrand. The boat went over and took on water. It had heavy ballast, stone covered with a latticework, and it sank in the blink of an eye. It all happened so fast that no one on land fully understood what had happened. People quickly rowed out to the scene, but there was nothing to see when they arrived. Soon afterward, Nils's fiddle and hat floated up, and that was all. This caused much sadness because Nils was a popular man known for his hard work, artistic sense, and forthrightness.

== Tjoflot's fiddles ==
Tjoflot owned several fiddles in his work as a folk musician. He also made his own Hardanger fiddles, and at one time he owned a Samnanger fiddle. The article "Felene hans Nils Tjoflot" (Nils Tjoflot's Fiddles) is dedicated to Tjoflot's instruments.

The fiddle that floated to the surface after Tjoflot drowned on the morning of June 11, 1898 was repaired by the violin maker Knut Eilevsson Steintjønndalen, who had also made the instrument. The fiddle was restored to its original condition, but perhaps not as good as when it was owned by Tjoflot, who considered it a top-quality instrument. The fiddle is now displayed at the Hardanger Folk Museum in Utne, which lies across the Hardanger Fjord from the village of Tjoflot.

== Musical work ==
Tjoflot composed Hardanger fiddle pieces (slåtter), schottisches, waltzes, and other pieces. He was especially fond of playing pieces for turning dances (runddans). He established his own Tjoflot version of tunes for turning dances. Tjoflot had a distinctive style of playing and way of performing material that was well-liked by people. He also taught several folk musicians in Hardanger, and he taught them the Hardanger fiddle pieces that he had learned from others as well as his own compositions.

Tjoflot's Hardanger fiddle pieces and waltzes are also performed today, and recordings of them have been played on the folk music program on Norwegian radio. About 20 waltzes are known based on the work of Nils Tjoflot. Many of these waltzes were recorded by the folk musician Anders S. Kjerland from Granvin.

In 2008, the diatonic button accordion player Rannveig Djønne released a CD called Spelferd heim – slåtter frå Hardanger og Voss på durspel (Spelferd Heim: Tunes from Hardanger and Voss for Button Accordion) on which she performs three pieces by Nils Tjoflot: "Hamborgar etter Nils Tjoflot" (Hamburg Melody by Nils Tjoflot), "Reinlender etter Nils Tjoflot" (Rhineland Melody by Nils Tjoflot), and the well-known "Ginavalsen" (Gina Waltz), which he wrote in heartbreak when he learned that the girl he loved had become engaged to another.
