= Djønno =

Village in Voss Municipality, Norway

- Village
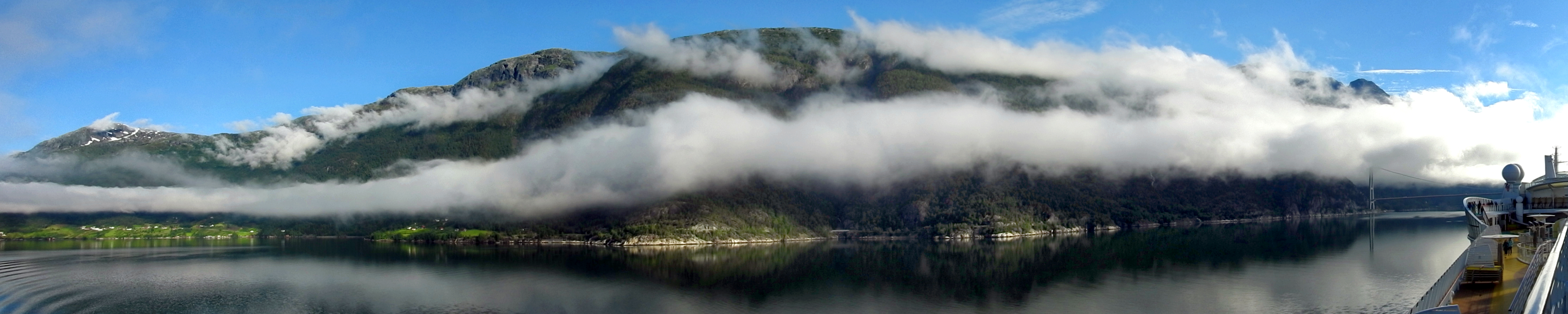
- Interactive map of Djønno
- Coordinates: 60.46524°N 6.75044°E
- Country: Norway
- Region: Western Norway
- County: Vestland
- District: Hardanger
- Municipality: Voss Municipality
- Elevation: 57 m (187 ft)
- Time zone: UTC+01:00 (CET)
  - Summer (DST): UTC+02:00 (CEST)
- Post Code: 5734 Vallavik

Djønno is a small village on the Oksen Peninsula in Voss Municipality in Vestland county in Norway's Hardanger district.

== Geography ==
Djønno lies near the sea on the west side of the Eid Fjord, about 10 kilometers (6.2 mi) south of the ferry station in Bruravik. The nearest neighboring village is Kaland, which lies 1 kilometer (0.62 mi) further into the fjord. Djønno is known for its fruit orchards.

== History ==
The area has been transferred between municipalities several times. It was historically part of Kinsarvik Municipality until 1869 when it became part of Ullensvang Municipality. Then in 1913 it became part of Kinsarvik Municipality once again. In 1964 it became part of Ullensvang Municipality. In 2020, it became part of Voss Municipality.

The village first received a road connection in 1981, when it was connected by Norwegian County Road 302 to the northeast. Before that, passengers and cargo were transported to and from the village by boat. After the construction of the road, people from Djønno could travel much more easily to the neighboring Granvin Municipality and Ulvik Municipality than to the village of Kinsarvik, the administrative center of their own municipality (Ullensvang). Since the late 20th century, young people from Djønno attend school in the village of Granvin. In 2020, it became part of Voss Municipality since the new roads and tunnels made it so much easier to get to that municipality compared to Ullensvang Municipality.

== Notable people ==
The name of the village is also used as a surname, spelled Djønne. Notable people that were born or lived in Djønno include:

- Rannveig Djønne (born 1974), a folk musician
- Jorunn Hanto-Haugse, an orchardist and illustrator
