= Osa, Norway =

Village in Ulvik Municipality, Norway

Osa
- Village
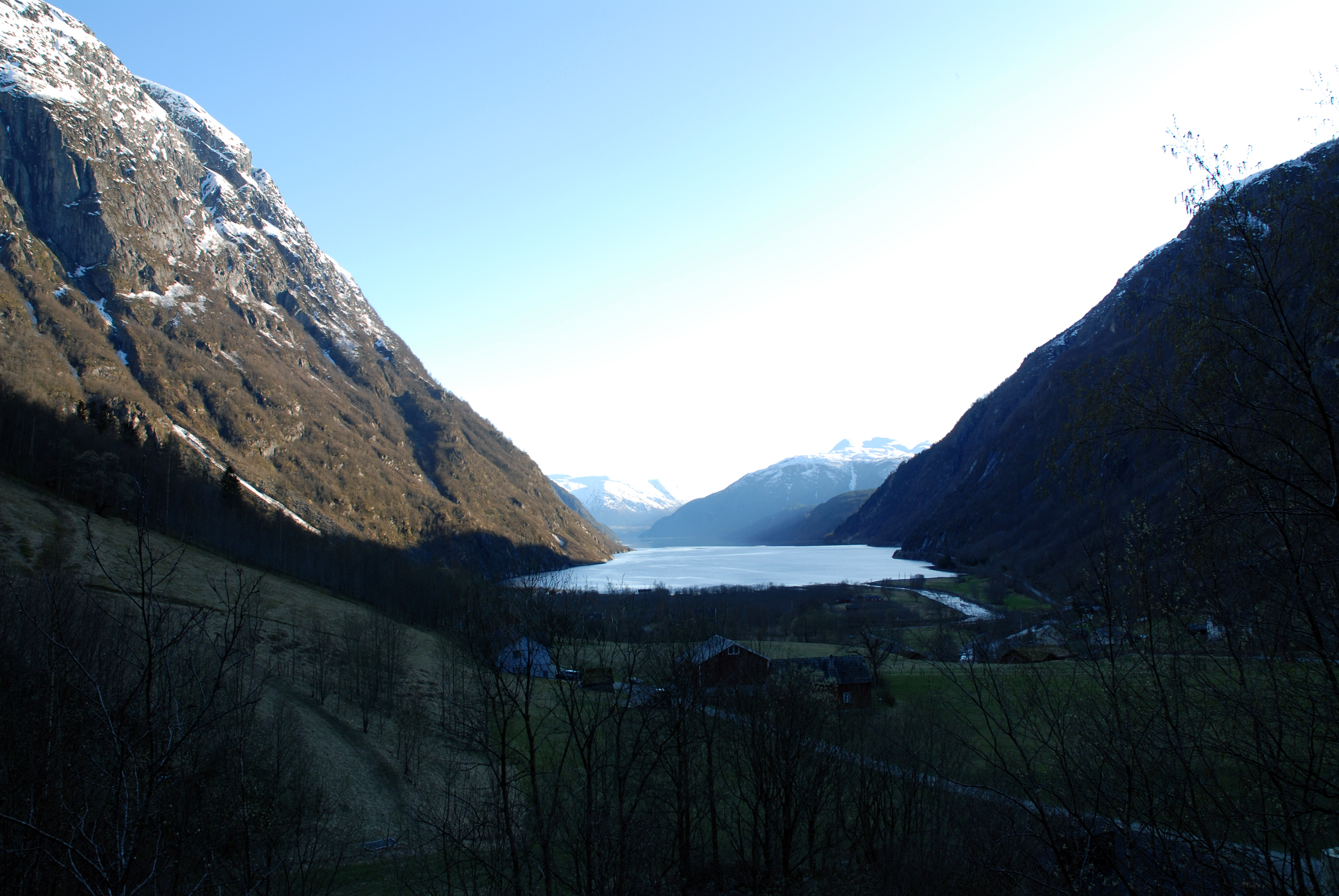
- View of the village
- Interactive map of Osa
- Coordinates: 60.58914°N 7.03543°E
- Country: Norway
- Region: Western Norway
- County: Vestland
- District: Hardanger
- Municipality: Ulvik Municipality
- Elevation: 14 m (46 ft)
- Time zone: UTC+01:00 (CET)
  - Summer (DST): UTC+02:00 (CEST)
- Post Code: 5730 Ulvik

Osa is a small village in Ulvik Municipality in Vestland county, Norway. The village lies at the end of the Osa Fjord, about 8 kilometres (5.0 mi) northeast of the village of Ulvik. The village sits at the confluence of the two rivers: Austdøla and Norddøla, which then join together for about 500 metres (1,600 ft) before emptying into the fjord. Historically, this place was the connection between the Hardanger district and Hallingskeid (up on the Hardangervidda plateau.
