= National Center for Nynorsk in Education =

The National Center for Nynorsk in Education (Norwegian: Nasjonalt senter for nynorsk i opplæringa or simply Nynorsksenteret 'Nynorsk Center') is a Norwegian organization dedicated to promoting the use of Nynorsk in education.

The center was opened by Ministry of Education and Research Kristin Clemet on March 30, 2005. It is located at Volda University College. The center is administratively linked to the college and academically to the Norwegian Directorate for Education and Training. The center carries out systematic research and development work to promote the learning of Nynorsk, primarily with regard to the course content.

According to a press release from the Ministry of Education and Research, the center "leads and coordinates efforts to develop content, methods, and assessment in Nynorsk parts of Norwegian language courses, offers heads of schools and schools support and guidance in work on motivation for and learning Nynorsk, establishes systematic research and development work to promote learning Nynorsk, and contributes to skill development." Every year, the center is able to specify a number of specific tasks in a letter of commission from the Directorate of Education. The letter of commission applies to all national resource centers, and the Nynorsk Center especially works in partnership with the National Center for Reading Education and Reading Research (Nasjonalt senter for leseopplæring og leseforsking) and the Norwegian Center for Writing Education and Research (Nasjonalt senter for skriveopplæring og skriveforsking).
