= Brimnes =

Village in Eidfjord Municipality, Norway

- Ferry quay
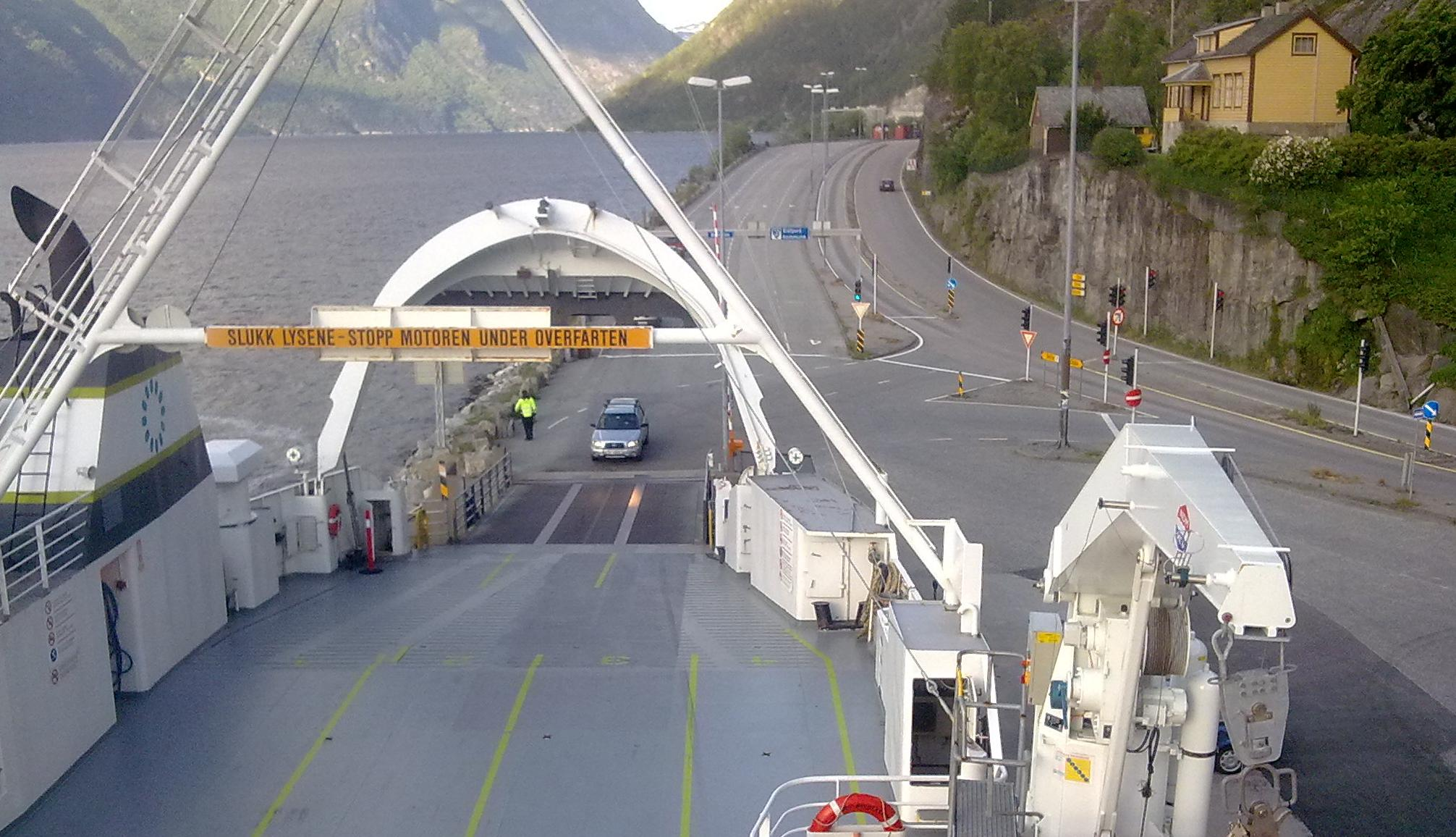
- Brimnes ferry quay seen from the MF Melderskin
- Interactive map of Brimnes
- Coordinates: 60.47138°N 6.90843°E
- Country: Norway
- Region: Western Norway
- County: Vestland
- District: Hardanger
- Municipality: Eidfjord Municipality
- Elevation: 1 m (3.3 ft)
- Time zone: UTC+01:00 (CET)
  - Summer (DST): UTC+02:00 (CEST)
- Post Code: 5780 Kinsarvik

Brimnes is a ferry quay in Eidfjord Municipality in Vestland county, Norway.

== Geography ==
The settlement lies on the south side of the Eid Fjord, an inner branch of the Hardanger Fjord. The ferry quay at Brimnes formerly served the ferry connection to Bruravik in Ulvik Municipality. The ferry was part of the Fylkesbåtene company. The ferry service was discontinued after the construction of the Hardanger Bridge.

Brimnes lies about 10 kilometers (6.2 mi) from the village of Eidfjord and about 20 kilometers (12 mi) from Kinsarvik in the neighboring Ullensvang Municipality.

== Name ==
The name was standardized as Brimnes in 1990. The folklorist Halldor O. Opedal argued that the name Brimnes is incorrect, and that the correct form of the name should be Brynnes, connecting the name with the verb bryne 'to land (a boat)'.

Der brynte dei eller lende med båtane sine på garden, og sjølve seier folki Brynnes med y. Bremnes med e er ei form som kontorfolk hev gripe ut or lufti. HSD brukar denne galne formi. No: Brimnes.
There they dragged their boats ashore or landed them at their farms, and the people themselves pronounce Brynnes with a y. Bremnes with an e is a form that pencil-pushers pulled out of the air. HSD uses that goofy form. Well: Brimnes.
