= Kjeåsen =

- Mountain farm
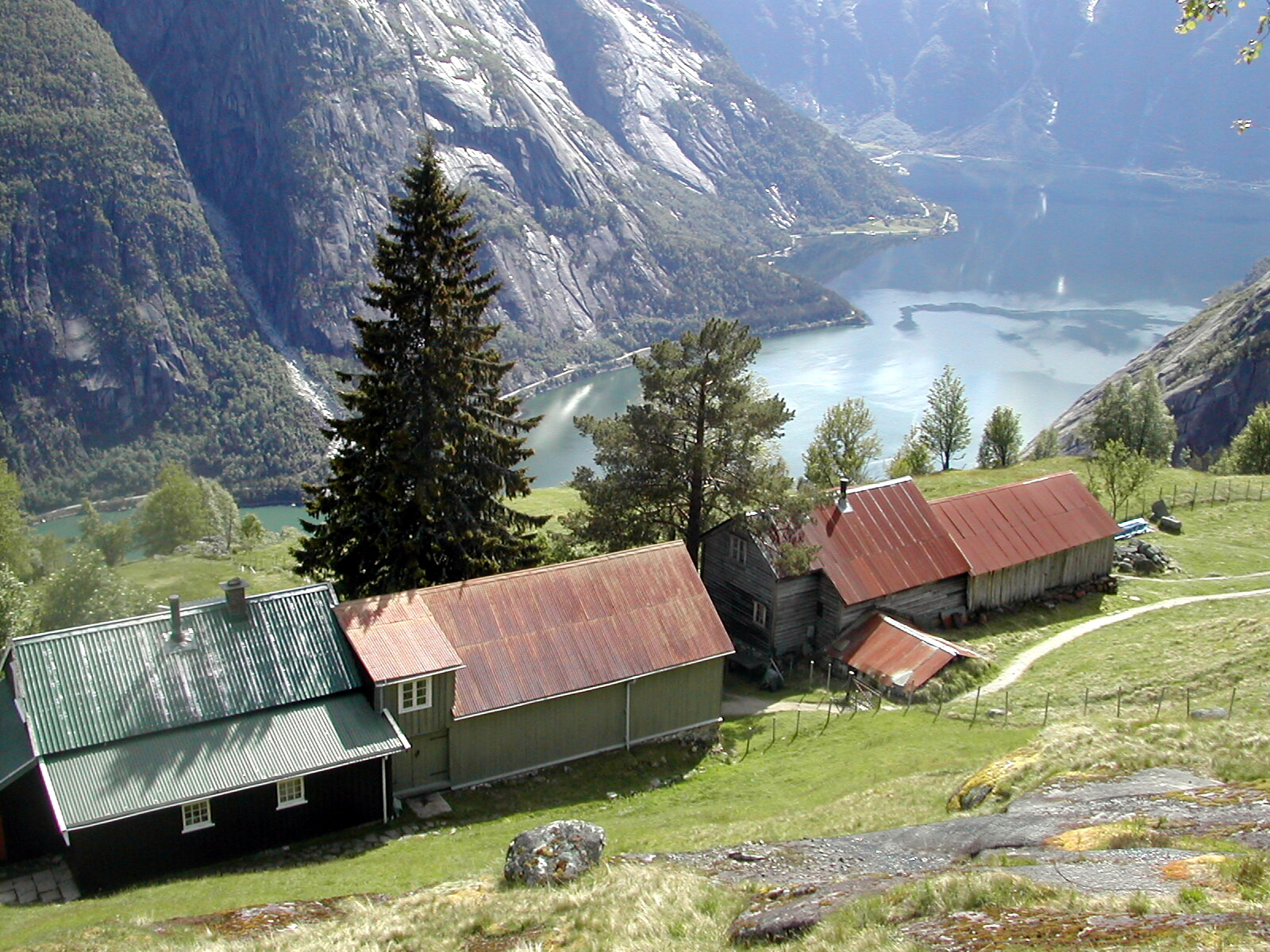
- Kjeåsen with the Simadal Fjord in the background
- Interactive map of Kjeåsen
- Coordinates: 60.50406°N 7.13058°E
- Country: Norway
- Region: Western Norway
- County: Vestland
- District: Hardanger
- Municipality: Eidfjord Municipality
- Elevation: 513 m (1,683 ft)
- Time zone: UTC+01:00 (CET)
  - Summer (DST): UTC+02:00 (CEST)
- Post Code: 5783 Eidfjord

Kjeåsen is a mountain farm (with two farmsteads) in Eidfjord Municipality in Norway's Hardanger district, in Vestland county. The farm lies at an elevation of 513 meters (1,683 ft) at the innermost point of the Simadal Fjord. The farm is no longer being worked, and one person lives there during the summer. The site is popular with tourists, especially Swedes. The farm has been referred to as "the world's most inaccessible farm."

Kjeåsen can be reached on foot up the steep path from the Sima Hydroelectric Power Station. This was the farm's road until 1974, and the trip takes about 1½ to 2 hours each way. Kjeåsen also has what is known as "the world's most expensive farm road"; it is 5 kilometers (3.1 mi) long, of which approximately 2.6 kilometers (1.6 mi) consists of a tunnel from the Sima Valley to the farm. The tunnel has a single lane, with driving directions scheduled up on the hour and down every half hour. The road and tunnel to Kjeåsen were built in 1974 in connection with hydroelectric development works in the Sima Valley. The tunnel has now been outfitted with lights. Walking and cycling are not permitted in the tunnel.

The name Kjeåsen comes from kje which means 'kid' and ås which means 'hill', inflected for definiteness. The farm has been inhabited at least since the 1650s. Until the road up to the farm was built, all transport took place on the steep path from the bottom of the fjord. In the 1930s a cable car was built that could carry food and other material up to the farm. However, the residents of Kjeåsen still had to use the trail as before. The outlying farmstead at Kjeåsen was vacated in 1962, and since 2010 the other farmstead has been inhabited only in the summer. The outlying farmstead was sold in 2016 after several hundred years in the same family.

The Swedish author Bror Ekström visited Kjeåsen in the 1950s and wrote a book about the people living there. His work, Folket på Kieåsen (The People of Kjeåsen), was first published in 1958 and became very popular. In Norway, Halldor O. Opedal published Kjeåsfolket i Hardanger. Soga om eit utkantfolk (The People of Kjeåsen in Hardanger. The Story of an Unknown People) in 1980. In 2001, Reinhard Kungel made a film for the German broadcaster ARD about the last mountain farmers in Norway. In Kjeåsen, he portrayed the last inhabitant, Bjorg Wiik. The Norwegian broadcasting company NRK aired a program about Kjeåsen in its series Der ingen skulle tru at nokon kunne bu (Where No One Would Think Anyone Could Live) in 2002. Sveriges Radio, the Swedish national radio broadcaster, has also aired a program about the farm.
