= Bruravik =

Village in Ulvik Municipality, Norway

- Ferry quay
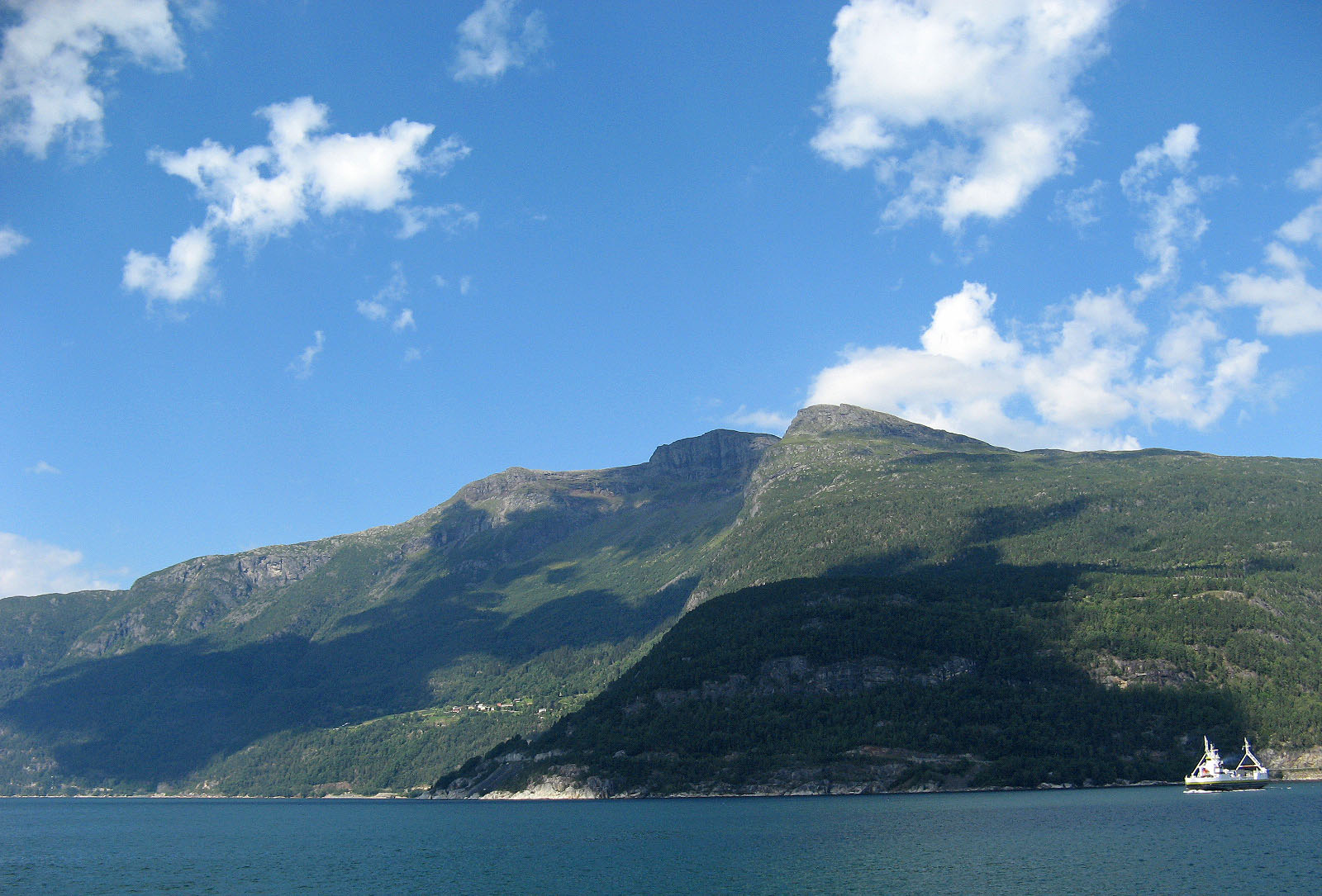
- View of the ferry quay for the ferry crossing the Eid Fjord.
- Interactive map of Bruravik
- Coordinates: 60.49236°N 6.8932°E
- Country: Norway
- Region: Western Norway
- County: Vestland
- District: Hardanger
- Municipality: Ulvik Municipality
- Elevation: 2 m (6.6 ft)
- Time zone: UTC+01:00 (CET)
  - Summer (DST): UTC+02:00 (CEST)
- Post Code: 5730 Ulvik

Bruravik is a ferry quay in Ulvik Municipality in Vestland county, Norway.

The old Bruravik–Brimnes Ferry used to have a route running between Bruravik and Brimnes in Eidfjord Municipality. The ferry quay was equipped with waiting rooms, benches, and restrooms. The ferry service was discontinued after the construction of the Hardanger Bridge, a short distance to the southwest.

Bruravik lies about 15 kilometers (9.3 mi) from the village of Ulvik, and it is also about 15 kilometers (9.3 mi) from the village of Granvin, which lies to the northwest.
