= Eid Fjord =

Fjord in Vestland, Norway

Eid Fjord Eidfjorden (Norwegian)
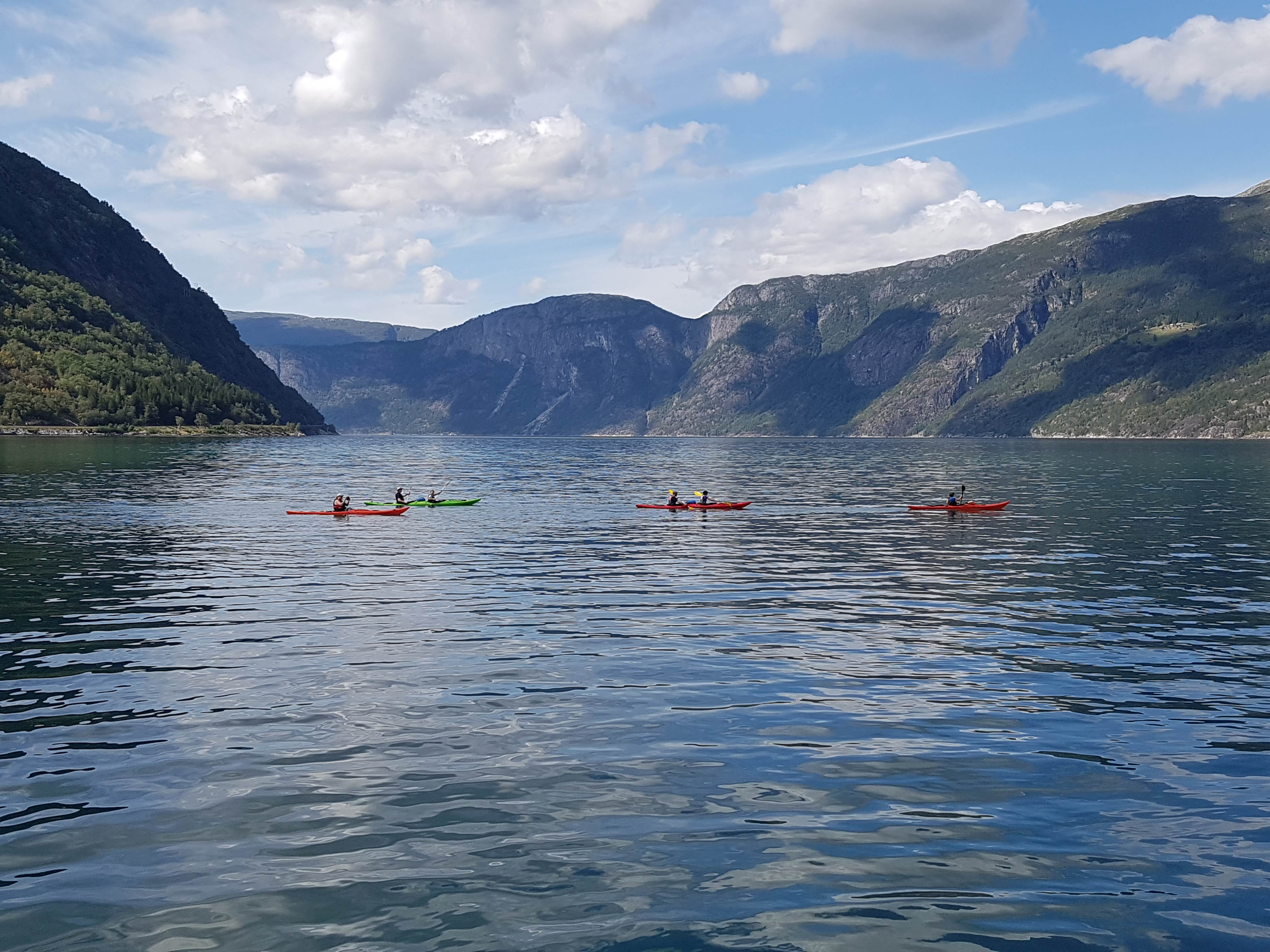
- View of the fjord
- Interactive map of the fjord
- Location: Vestland county, Norway
- Coordinates: 60.47679°N 6.88758°E
- Type: Fjord
- Basin countries: Norway
- Max. length: 29 kilometres (18 mi)

The Eid Fjord (English) or Eidfjorden (Norwegian) is the innermost part of the Hardanger Fjord in Norway. It extends 29 kilometers (18 mi) eastwards from the Utnefjorden and Sørfjorden. The Eid Fjord lies in Ullensvang Municipality, Ulvik Municipality, and Eidfjord Municipality in Vestland county.

The inner part of the ford is called the Simadal Fjord (Norwegian: Simadalsfjorden). The villages of Ringøy and Bjotveit lie on the south side of the fjord, and the village of Djønno lies on the north side. Further into the fjord, villages on the north side include Vangsbygdi and, to the east, Bruravik. From Bruravik there was the old Bruravik–Brimnes Ferry which connected to Brimnes on the south side of the fjord. This ferry was part of the route between Bergen and Oslo across the Hardangervidda Plateau on Norwegian National Road 7. In 2013 the ferry connection was replaced by the Hardanger Bridge. At Bruravik the Osa Fjord (Norwegian: Osafjorden) extends to the northeast. The outermost part of the Osa Fjord is also known as the Bagns Fjord (Norwegian: Bagnsfjorden). Deeper into the fjord, it makes a strong turn, first to the north and then to the south, where the village of Eidfjord is located. The Simadal Fjord extends from the village of Eidfjord, constituting the last 4 kilometers (2.5 mi) of the Hardanger Fjord.

== Gallery ==
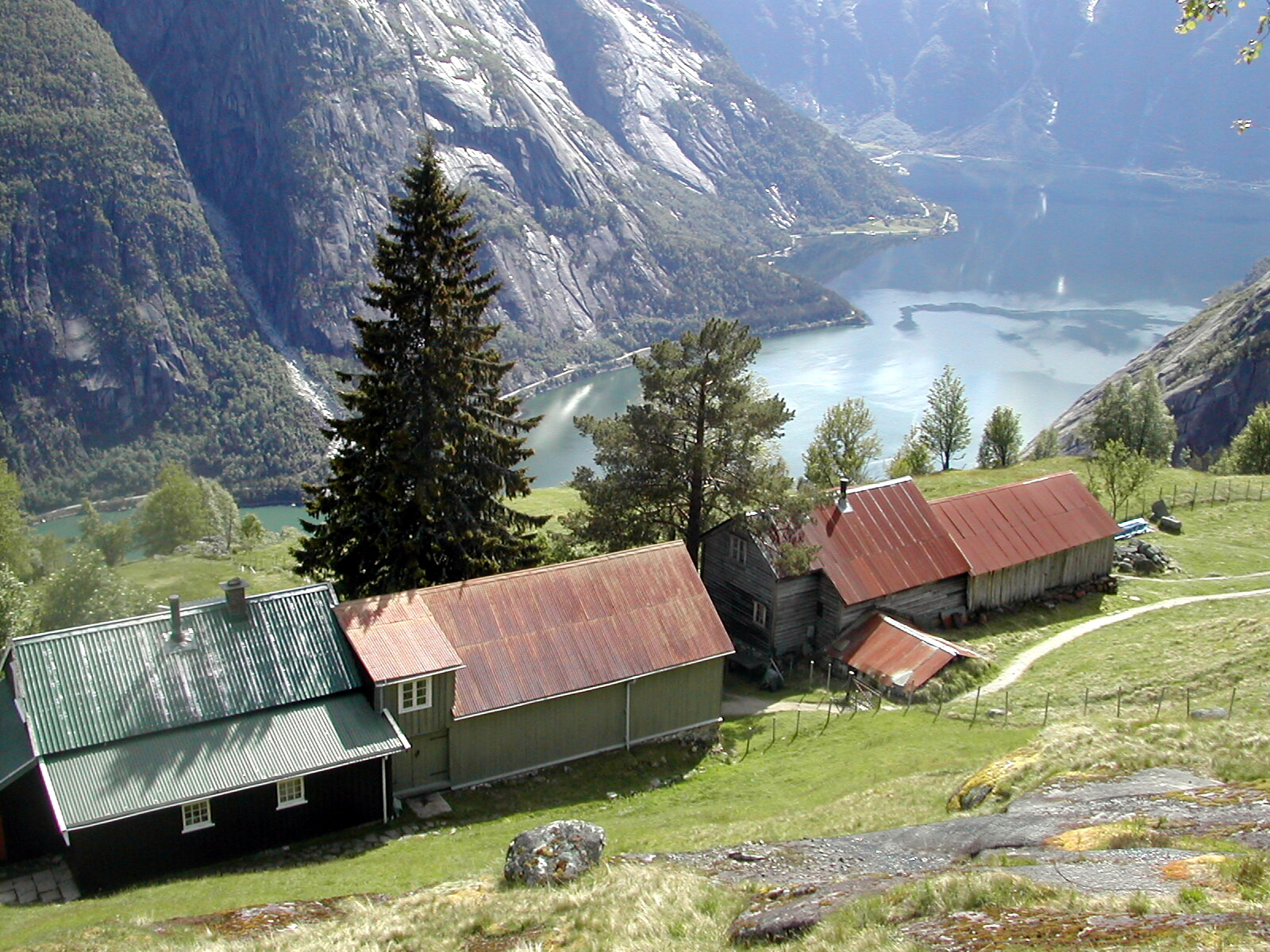
Kjeåsen in the Eid Fjord. The Simadal Fjord—the innermost part of the Eid Fjord and Hardanger Fjord—lies in the background.

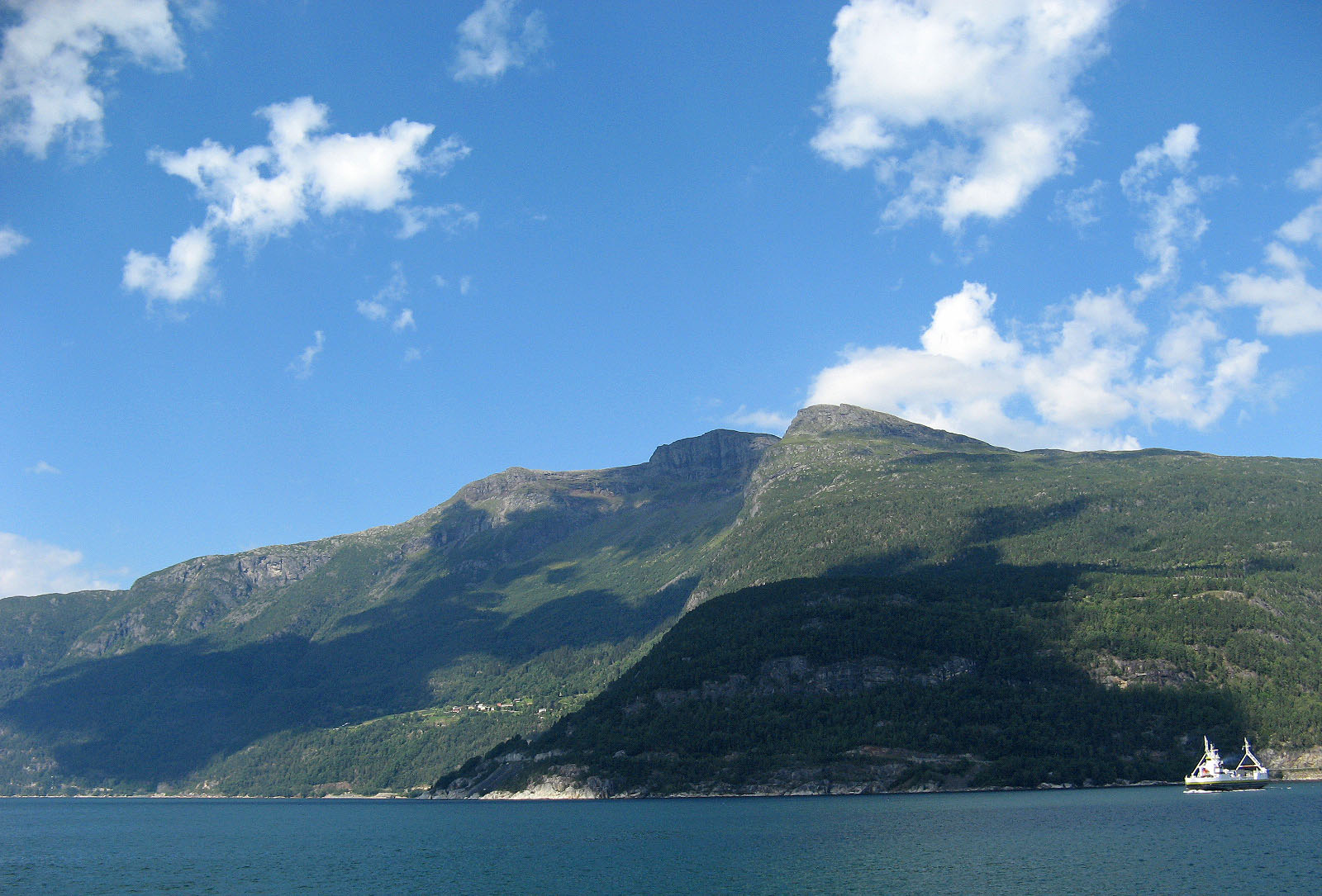
View of the fjord from the ferry dock at Brimnes. The route on the north side of the fjord is Norwegian National Roads 7 and 13 between Bruravik and the Vallavik Tunnel.
