= Hardanger Bridge =

Suspension bridge in Vestland, Norway

Hardanger Bridge Hardangerbrua
- View of the bridge seen from the east
- Coordinates: 60.47848°N 6.83033°E
- Carries: Rv7 Rv13
- Crosses: Hardangerfjorden
- Locale: Ullensvang and Ulvik, Vestland, Norway
- Maintained by: Norwegian Public Roads Administration

Characteristics
- Design: Suspension bridge
- Total length: 1,380 metres (4,530 ft)
- Width: 20 metres (66 ft)
- Height: 201.5 metres (661 ft)
- Longest span: 1,310 metres (4,300 ft)
- Clearance below: 55 metres (180 ft)

History
- Constructed by: MT Højgaard
- Construction start: February 2009
- Construction end: August 2013

Statistics
- Toll: Yes

Location
- Interactive map of Hardanger Bridge

The Hardanger Bridge (Norwegian: Hardangerbrua) is a suspension bridge across the Eidfjorden branch off of the main Hardangerfjorden in Vestland county, Norway. The bridge connects Ullensvang Municipality and Ulvik Municipality. It replaced a ferry connection between Bruravik and Brimnes, and thereby shortens the driving time between Oslo and Bergen. It has the longest suspension bridge span in Norway.

== Construction ==
The bridge was approved for building by the Norwegian Parliament on February 28, 2006, and construction began on February 26, 2009. While the bridge was engineered by the Norwegian Public Roads Administration, the construction was done by MT Højgaard. The project had a budget of 2.3 billion kr (€290 million) and more than half of this will be paid by toll and saved ferry subsidies. The Administration is considering a different route over a future bridge as the main connection between East and West.

The bridge is 1,380 metres (4,530 ft) long, with a main span of 1,310 metres (4,300 ft). The maximum deck height is 55 metres (180 ft) and the towers reach 200 metres (660 ft) above sea level. There are two driving lanes for cars with an 80 kilometres per hour (50 mph) speed limit, and a separate lane for pedestrians and cyclists. The deck height means that the largest cruise ships cannot reach the inner Hardangerfjord any more.

The traffic predicted for the bridge was estimated to be 2000 vehicles per day. The opening of the bridge took place on 17 August 2013.

The main span is one of the longest suspension bridge spans in the world. It is also the longest tunnel to tunnel suspension bridge in the world. On the south end of the bridge, cars immediately enter the 1.2-kilometre (0.75 mi) Bu Tunnel that goes under the village of Bu, while on the north side of the bridge, cars immediately enter the 7.5-kilometre (4.7 mi) Vallavik Tunnel which includes a 500-metre (1,600 ft) long segment to a roundabout inside the tunnel. At the roundabout, cars can take another 500-metre (1,600 ft) long tunnel that leads to Ulvik or they can take a 7-kilometre (4.3 mi) long tunnel to Granvin.

== Media gallery ==
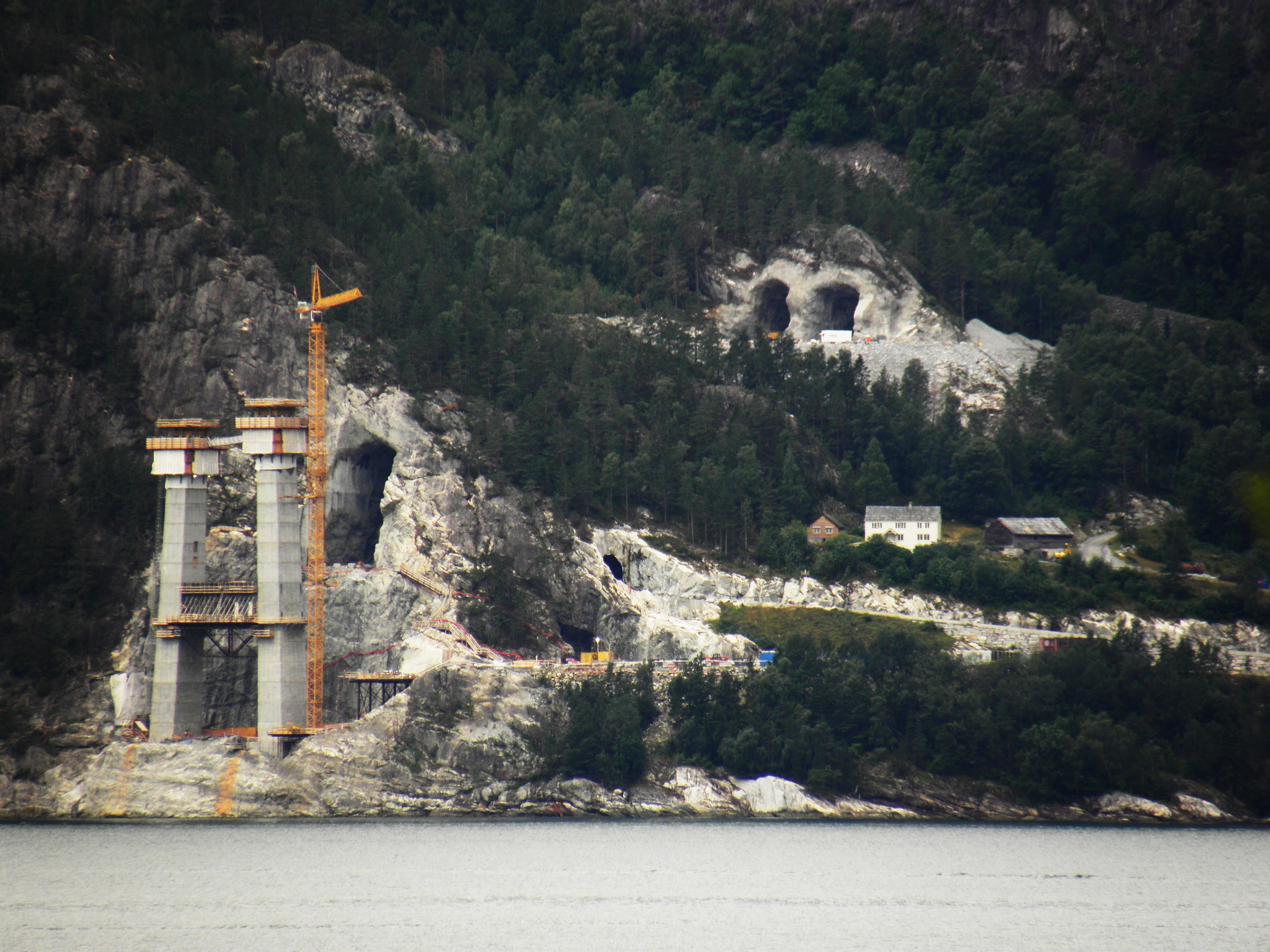
The bridge under construction, July 2010

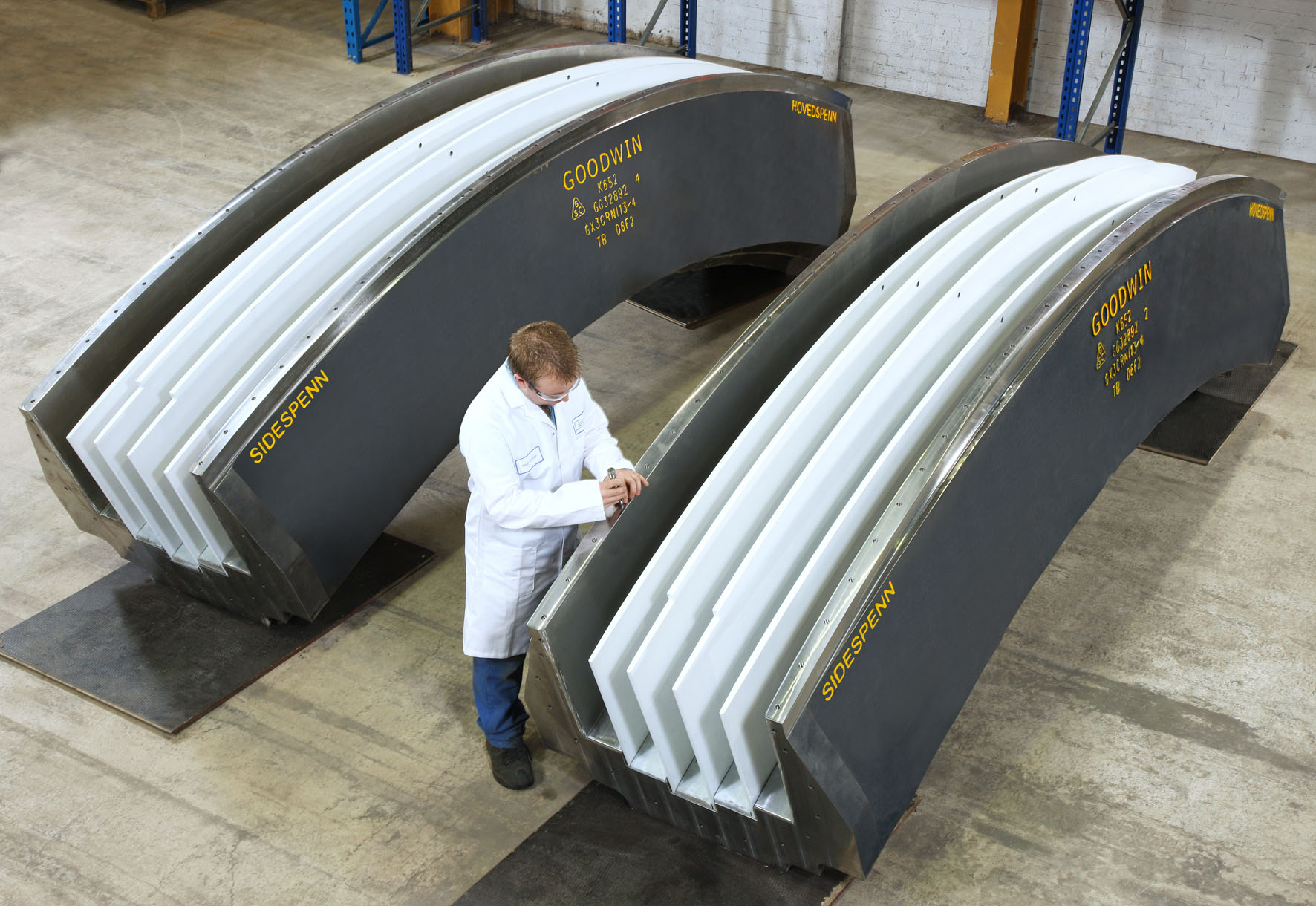
Tower Cable Saddles for the Hardanger Bridge

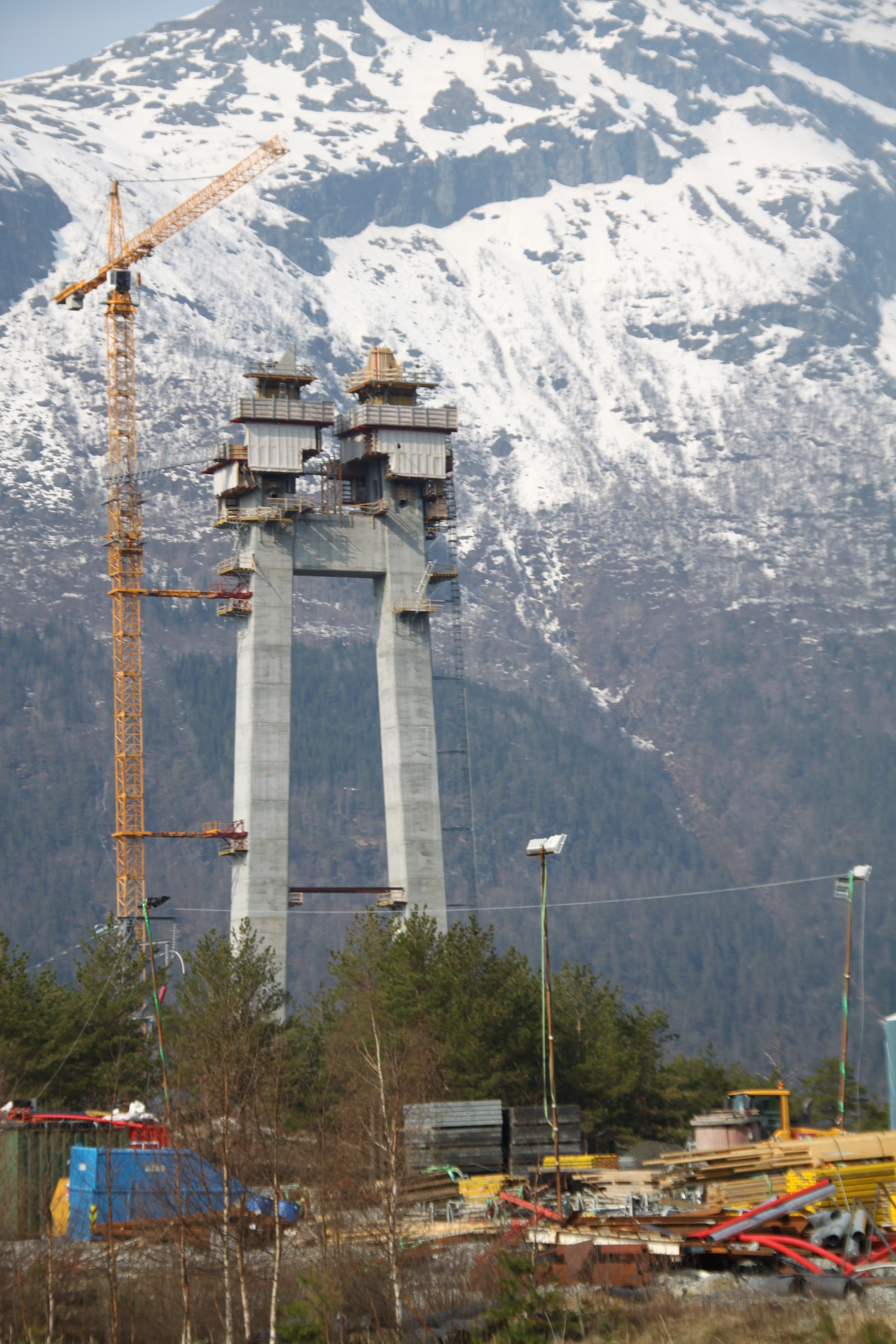
The bridge towers under construction

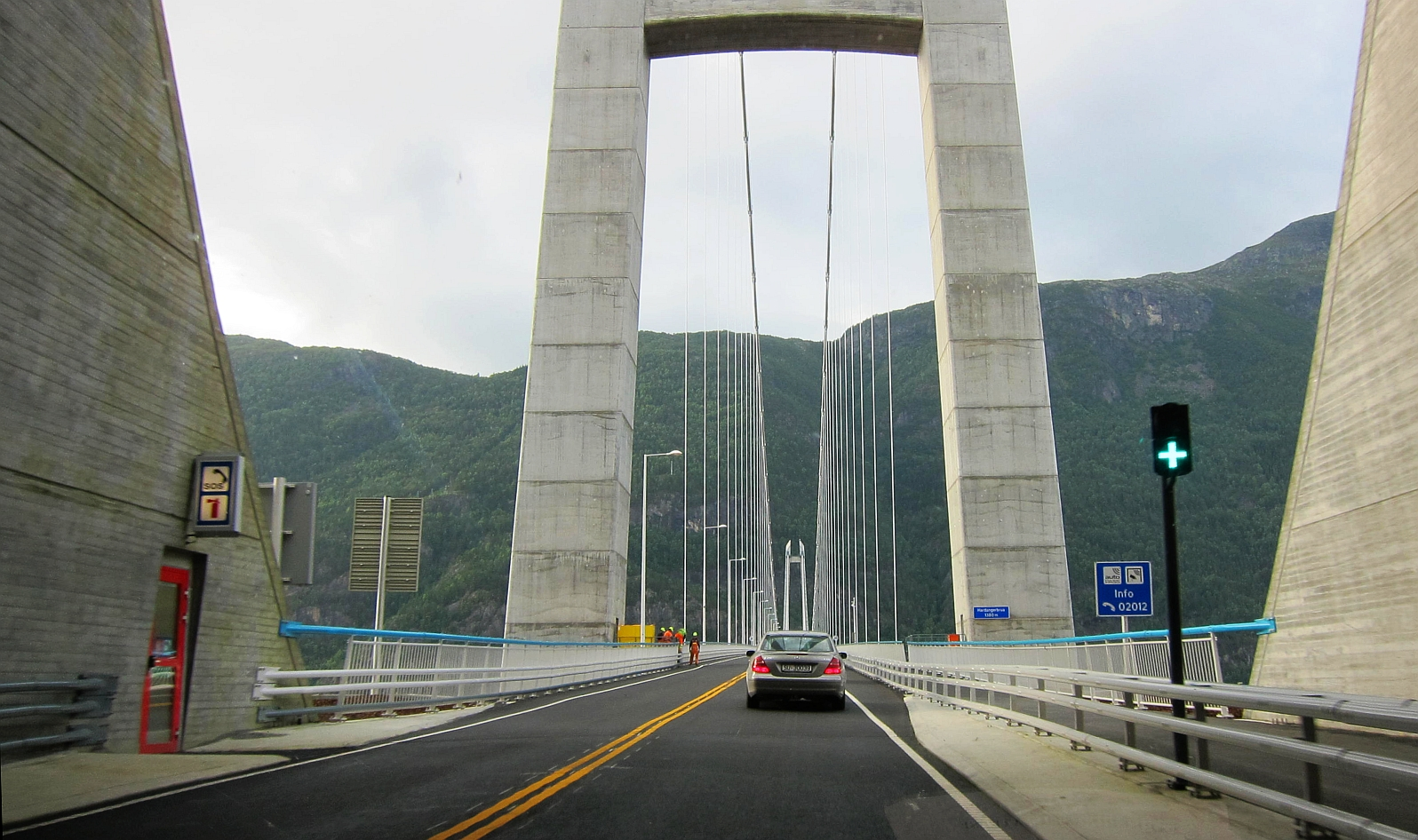
View while crossing

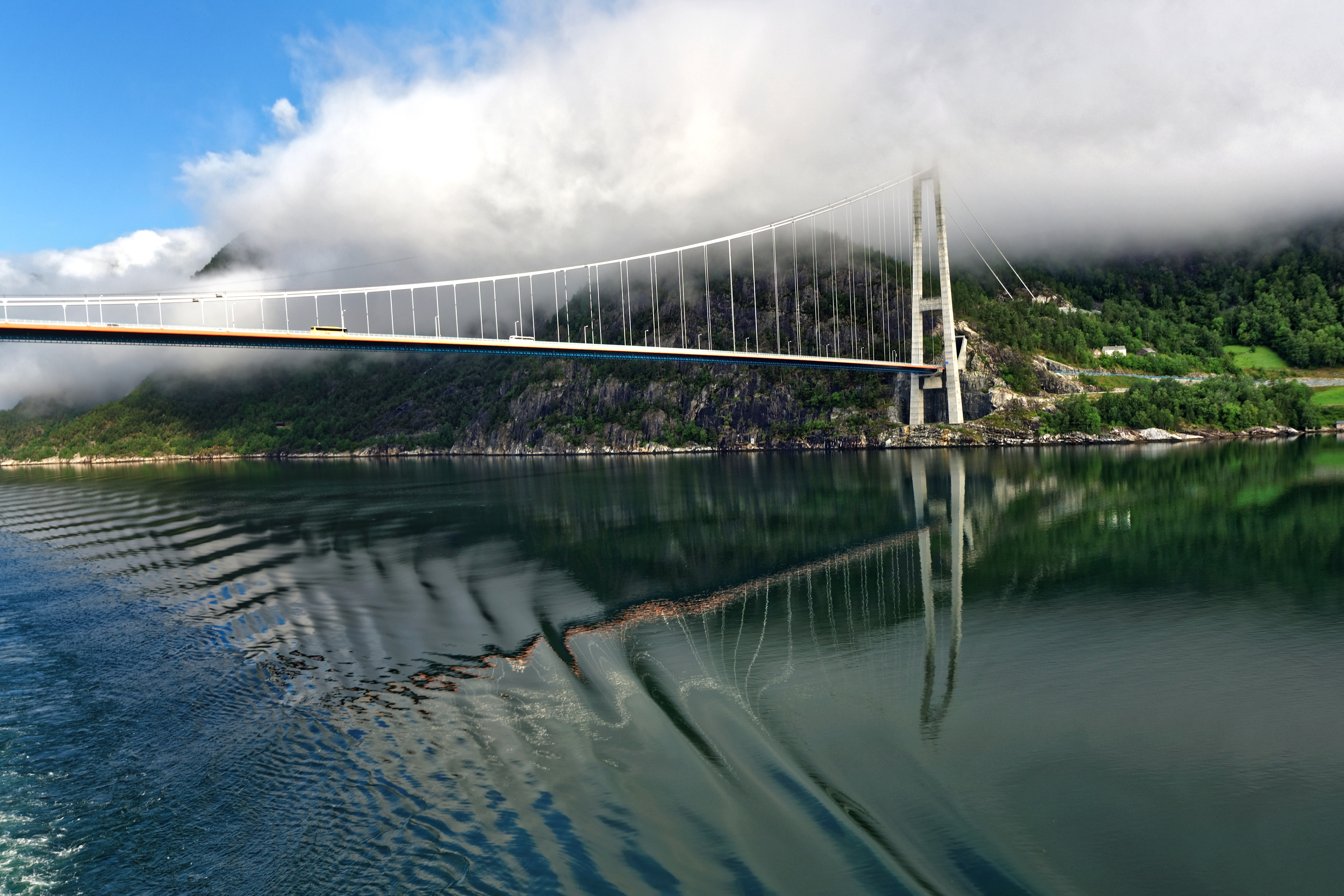
View from a passing boat

== See also ==
- List of bridges in Norway
- List of longest suspension bridge spans
