= Sima Hydroelectric Power Station =

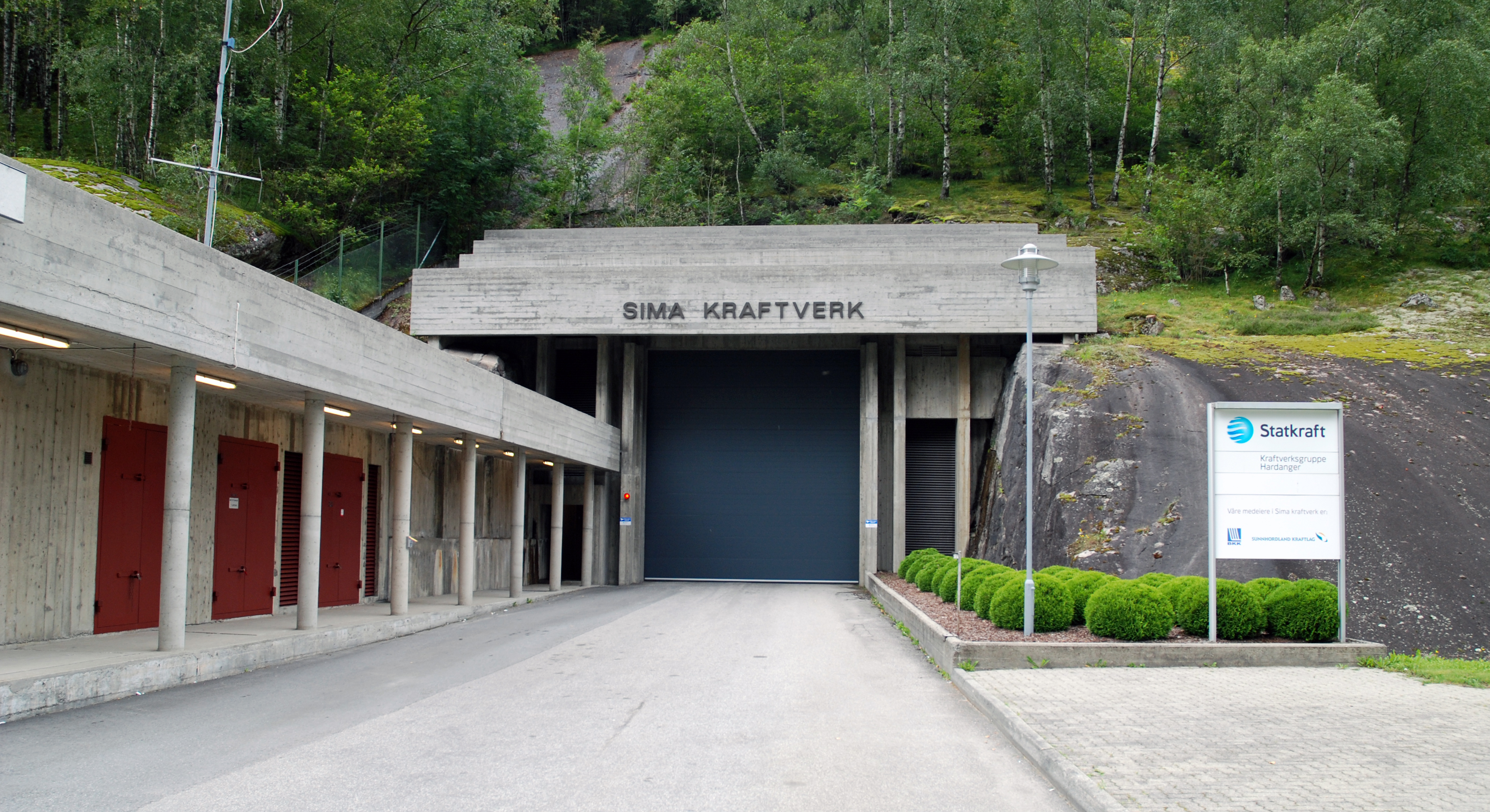
- Interactive map of Sima Hydroelectric Power Station
- Official name: Sima kraftverk
- Country: Norway
- Location: Eidfjord Municipality
- Coordinates: 60°29′58″N 7°08′31″E
- Status: Operational
- Owners: Statkraft (65%), BKK (26.25%), Sunnhordland Kraftlag (8.75%)

Power Station
- Commission date: 1980; 46 years ago
- Turbines: 4
- Installed capacity: 1,120 MW
- Capacity factor: 29.1%
- Annual generation: 2,852 GW·h

The Sima Power Station is a hydroelectric power station located in Eidfjord Municipality in Vestland, Norway. It stands at the mouth of the Sima River. The facility Lang-Sima operates at an installed capacity of 500 megawatts (670,000 hp), and has an average annual production of 1,212 gigawatt-hours (4,360 TJ). The facility Sy-Sima has an installed capacity of 620 megawatts (830,000 hp), and an average annual production of 1,640 gigawatt-hours (5,900 TJ). Operator is Statkraft.
