= Kinsarvik Municipality =

Former municipality in Hordaland, Norway

Kinsarvik Municipality Kinsarvik herad
- Former municipality
- Kinservik herred (historic name)
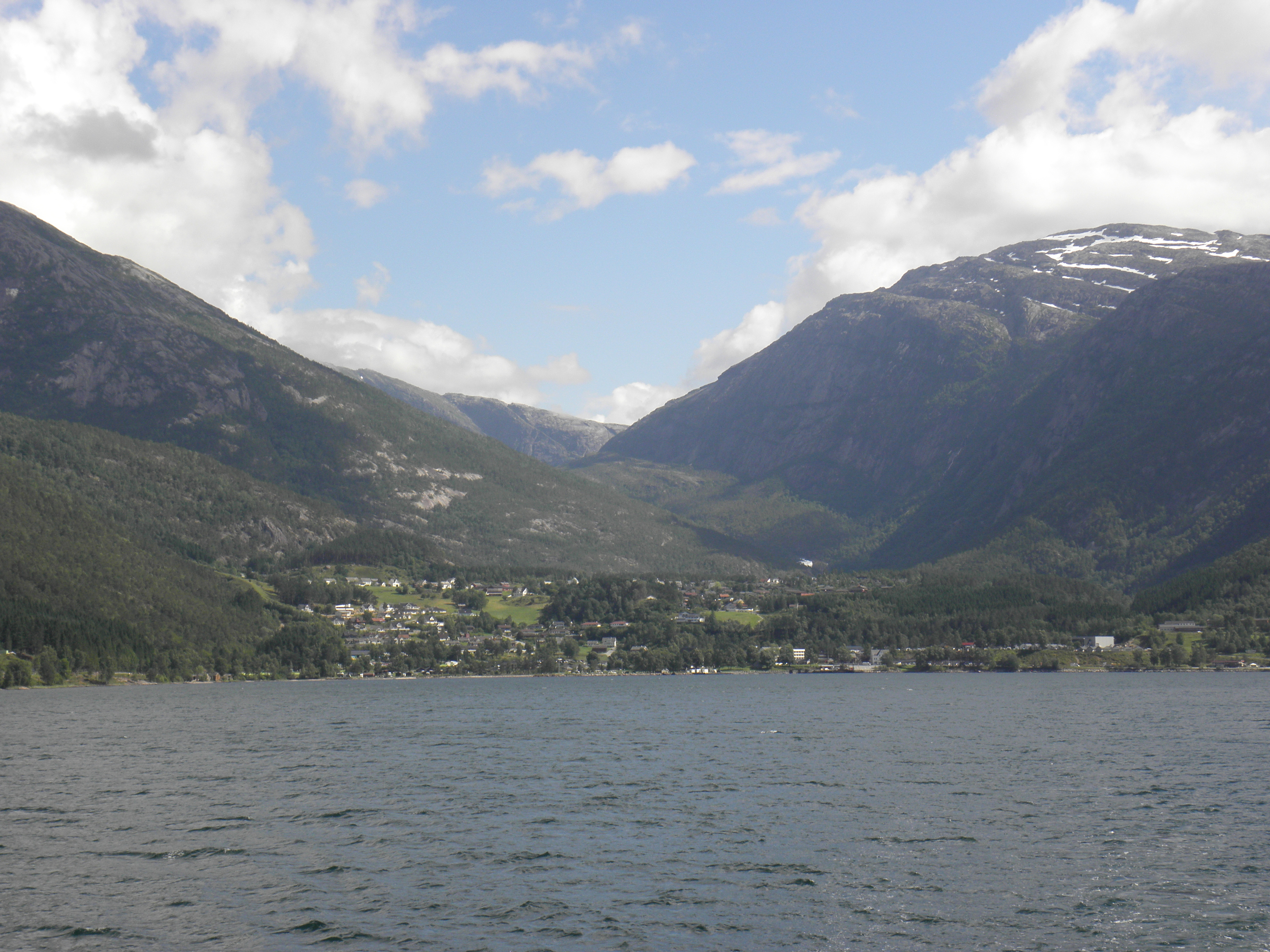
- View of Kinsarvik

- Hordaland within Norway

- Kinsarvik within Hordaland
- Coordinates: 60°22′28″N 06°43′12″E
- Country: Norway
- County: Hordaland
- District: Hardanger
- Established: 1 Jan 1913
  - Preceded by: Ullensvang Municipality
- Disestablished: 1 Jan 1964
  - Succeeded by: Ullensvang Municipality
- Administrative centre: Kinsarvik

Government
  - Mayor (1961–1963): Jakob D. Hus

Area (upon dissolution)
  - Total: 392.5 km^{2} (151.5 sq mi)
  - Rank: #232 in Norway
- Highest elevation: 1,648 m (5,407 ft)

Population (1963)
  - Total: 1,585
  - Rank: #526 in Norway
  - Density: 4/km^{2} (10/sq mi)
  - Change (10 years): ▼ −3.5%
- Demonym: Kinserviking

Official language
  - Norwegian form: Nynorsk
- Time zone: UTC+01:00 (CET)
  - Summer (DST): UTC+02:00 (CEST)
- ISO 3166 code: NO-1231

Kinsarvik is a former municipality in the old Hordaland county, Norway. The 392.5-square-kilometre (151.5 sq mi) municipality existed from 1913 until its dissolution in 1964. The area is now part of Ullensvang Municipality in the traditional district of Hardanger in Vestland county. The administrative centre was the village of Kinsarvik.

Prior to its dissolution in 1964, the 392.5-square-kilometre (151.5 sq mi) municipality was the 232nd largest by area out of the 689 municipalities in Norway. Kinsarvik Municipality was the 526th most populous municipality in Norway with a population of about 1,585. The municipality's population density was 4 inhabitants per square kilometre (10/sq mi) and its population had decreased by 3.5% over the previous 10-year period.

== General information ==
The large parish of Kinsarvik (historically spelled Kinzervig) was a prestegjeld in Norway for a long time. On 1 January 1838 the parish of Kinsarvik was established as a civil municipality (see formannskapsdistrikt law). The new Kinsarvik Municipality was centered at Kinsarvik Church and it had one annex church (Ullensvang Church) at Lofthus. In 1869, Ullensvang became the main parish, and Kinsarvik became an annex to Ullensvang (and at the same time the name was changed to Ullensvang Municipality).

On 1 July 1913, the large Ullensvang Municipality was split into three separate municipalities:

- the northwestern part (population: 1,736) became the new Kinsarvik Municipality
- the central part (population: 1,941) continued on as a smaller Ullensvang Municipality
- the southern part (population: 3,077) became the new Odda Municipality

During the 1960s, there were many municipal mergers across Norway due to the work of the Schei Committee. On 1 January 1964, Kinsarvik municipality was dissolved. The Lussand-Kvanndal area north of the Hardangerfjorden (population: 72) was transferred to Granvin Municipality. The remainder of Kinsarvik Municipality (population: 1,513) was merged (back) into Ullensvang Municipality.

=== Name ===
The municipality (originally the parish) is named after the old Kinsarvik farm (Old Norse: Kinsarvík) since the first Kinsarvik Church was built there. The first element is the genitive case of the old river name Kinns (now called Kinso). That name comes from the word kinn which means "steep hillside". The last element is vík which means "bay" or "cove".

Historically, the name of the municipality was spelled Kinservik. On 3 November 1917, a royal resolution changed the spelling of the name of the municipality to Kinsarvik.

=== Churches ===
The Church of Norway had one parish (sokn) within Kinsarvik Municipality. At the time of the municipal dissolution, it was part of the Ullensvang prestegjeld and the Hardanger og Voss prosti (deanery) in the Diocese of Bjørgvin.

Churches in Kinsarvik Municipality
Parish (sokn)	Church name	Location of the church	Year built
Kinsarvik	Kinsarvik Church	Kinsarvik	c. 1150
Kinsarvik	Utne Chapel	Utne	1895

== Geography ==
The municipality was centered around the inner part of the Hardangerfjorden, at the place where the main fjord splits into the Granvinsfjorden, Eidfjorden, and Sørfjorden. The highest point in the municipality is the 1,648-metre (5,407 ft) tall mountain Sovarenuten.

Granvin Municipality and Ulvik Municipality were to the north, Eidfjord Municipality was to the east, Ullensvang Municipality was to the south, Kvam Municipality was to the west, and Voss Municipality was to the northwest.

== Government ==
While it existed, Kinsarvik Municipality was responsible for primary education (through 10th grade), outpatient health services, senior citizen services, welfare and other social services, zoning, economic development, and municipal roads and utilities. The municipality was governed by a municipal council of directly elected representatives. The mayor was indirectly elected by a vote of the municipal council. The municipality was under the jurisdiction of the Gulating Court of Appeal.

=== Municipal council ===
The municipal council (Heradsstyre) of Kinsarvik Municipality was made up of 13 representatives that were elected to four year terms. The tables below show the historical composition of the council by political party.

Kinsarvik heradsstyre 1959–1963
Party name (in Nynorsk)	Number of representatives
Labour Party (Arbeidarpartiet)	3
Conservative Party (Høgre)	1
Centre Party (Senterpartiet)	7
Liberal Party (Venstre)	2
Total number of members:	13
Note: On 1 January 1964, Kinsarvik Municipality became part of Ullensvang Municipality.

Kinsarvik heradsstyre 1955–1959
Party name (in Nynorsk)	Number of representatives
Local List(s) (Lokale lister)	13
Total number of members:	13

Kinsarvik heradsstyre 1951–1955
Party name (in Nynorsk)	Number of representatives
Local List(s) (Lokale lister)	12
Total number of members:	12

Kinsarvik heradsstyre 1947–1951
Party name (in Nynorsk)	Number of representatives
Labour Party (Arbeidarpartiet)	1
Joint List(s) of Non-Socialist Parties (Borgarlege Felleslister)	11
Total number of members:	12

Kinsarvik heradsstyre 1945–1947
Party name (in Nynorsk)	Number of representatives
Labour Party (Arbeidarpartiet)	3
Local List(s) (Lokale lister)	9
Total number of members:	12

Kinsarvik heradsstyre 1937–1941*
Party name (in Nynorsk)	Number of representatives
Labour Party (Arbeidarpartiet)	2
Joint List(s) of Non-Socialist Parties (Borgarlege Felleslister)	10
Total number of members:	12
Note: Due to the German occupation of Norway during World War II, no elections were held for new municipal councils until after the war ended in 1945.

=== Mayors ===
The mayor (Nynorsk: ordførar) of Kinsarvik Municipality was the political leader of the municipality and the chairperson of the municipal council. The following people have held this position:

- 1913–1925: Lars Aga
- 1926–1934: Gunnar E. Bjotveit
- 1934–1941: Torgeir J. Alvsaaker
- 1941–1945: Olav Eidnes
- 1945–1945: Torgeir J. Alvsaaker
- 1946–1951: Knut Vindal
- 1951–1961: Josef Lutro (Sp)
- 1961–1963: Jakob D. Hus

== See also ==
- List of former municipalities of Norway
