= Kinsarvik =

Village in Ullensvang Municipality, Norway

- Village
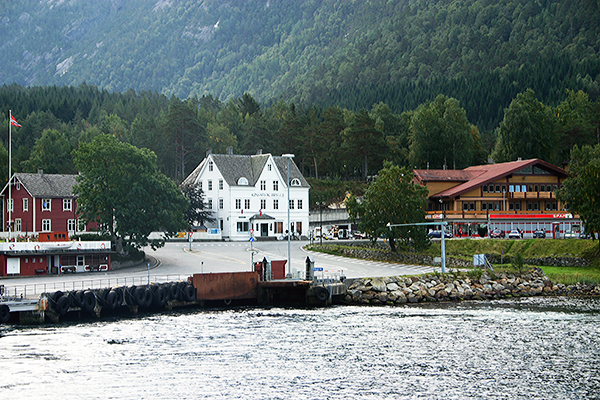
- View of the village
- Interactive map of Kinsarvik
- Coordinates: 60.37567°N 6.71948°E
- Country: Norway
- Region: Western Norway
- County: Vestland
- District: Hardanger
- Municipality: Ullensvang Municipality

Area
  - Total: 0.7 km^{2} (0.27 sq mi)
- Elevation: 5 m (16 ft)

Population (2025)
  - Total: 591
  - Density: 844/km^{2} (2,190/sq mi)
- Time zone: UTC+01:00 (CET)
  - Summer (DST): UTC+02:00 (CEST)
- Post Code: 5780 Kinsarvik

Kinsarvik is a village in Ullensvang Municipality in Vestland county, Norway. The village is located at the end of a small bay at the confluence of the Sørfjorden and the Eidfjorden, where they join to form the main branch of the Hardangerfjorden. The village lies along the Norwegian National Road 13 and it has a ferry port with regular routes that connect it to Utne and Kvanndal across the fjord.

The 0.7-square-kilometre (170-acre) village has a population (2025) of 591 and a population density of 844 inhabitants per square kilometre (2,190/sq mi).

Due to its important location along the Hardangerfjorden, Kinsarvik has been an important location since the Viking Age. Kinsarvik has been the site of Kinsarvik Church since the 12th century, serving the people of the whole region. The parish of Kinsarvik was made into a municipality in 1838. Kinsarvik Municipality existed as a municipality off and on from 1838 until 1964 when it was merged into Ullensvang Municipality. This village was the administrative centre of Ullensvang Municipality until 2020 when the municipality was enlarged and the administrative centre was moved to the town of Odda.

== Geography ==
Kinsarvik sits at the end of the Husedalen valley. The wild Kinso river runs through the village, and the rivers is what gives name to Kinsarvik. Its name stems from "kinn" which means "steep mountainside" (the valley has steep mountainsides) and so "Kinsarvik" simply means "The Bay of Kinso". The Kinso River drops 3,600 feet (1,100 m) from the vast Hardangervidda plateau through the Husedalen valley before emptying into the sea level fjord at Kinsarvik. Along the way there are 4 spectacular waterfalls. The waterfalls can be viewed over the course of 4–6 hours of hiking. Kinsarvik is also a major access point many longer treks into the Hardangervidda National Park.

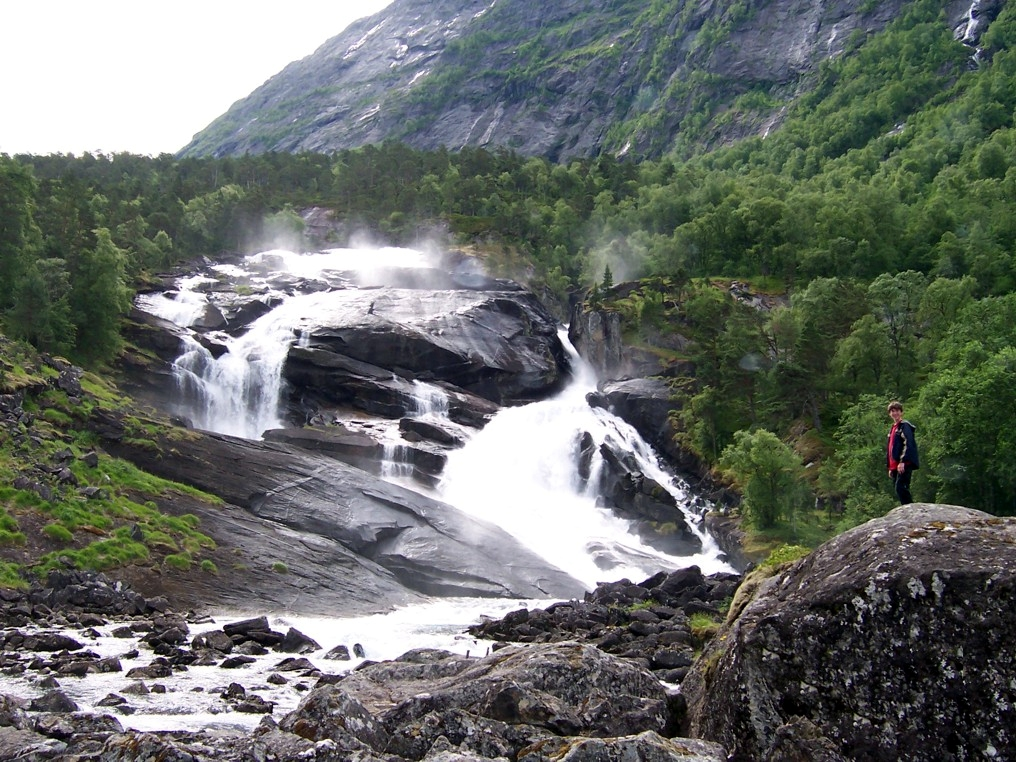
Tveitafossen falls, 338 feet

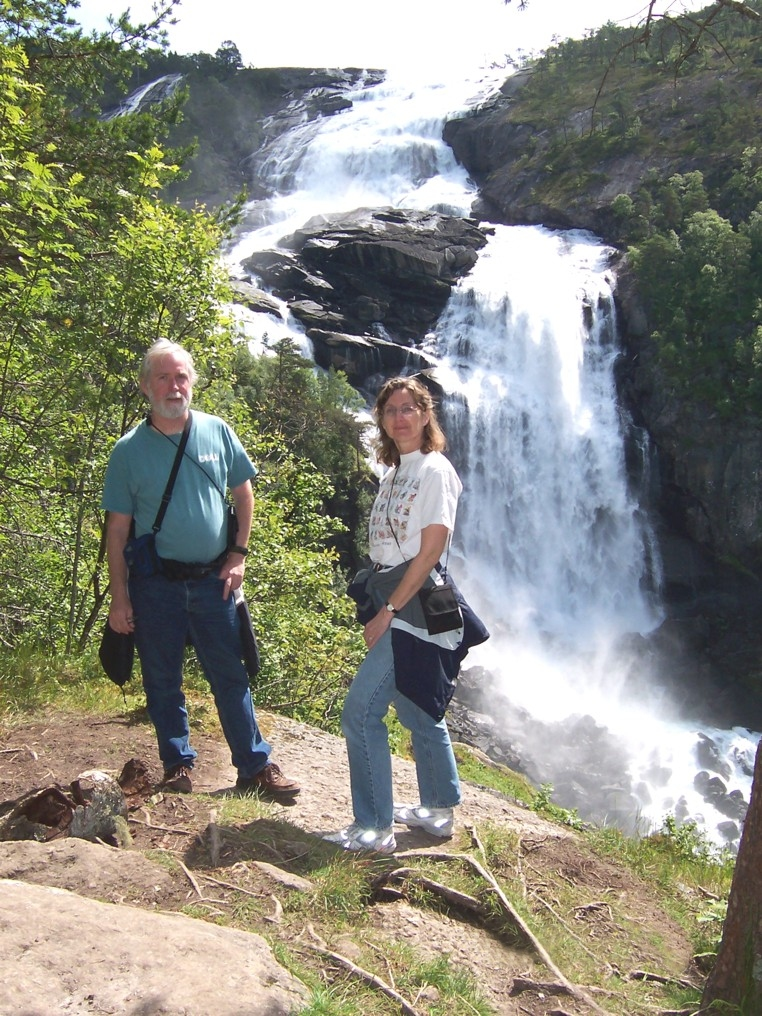
Nyastølfossen falls, 591 feet

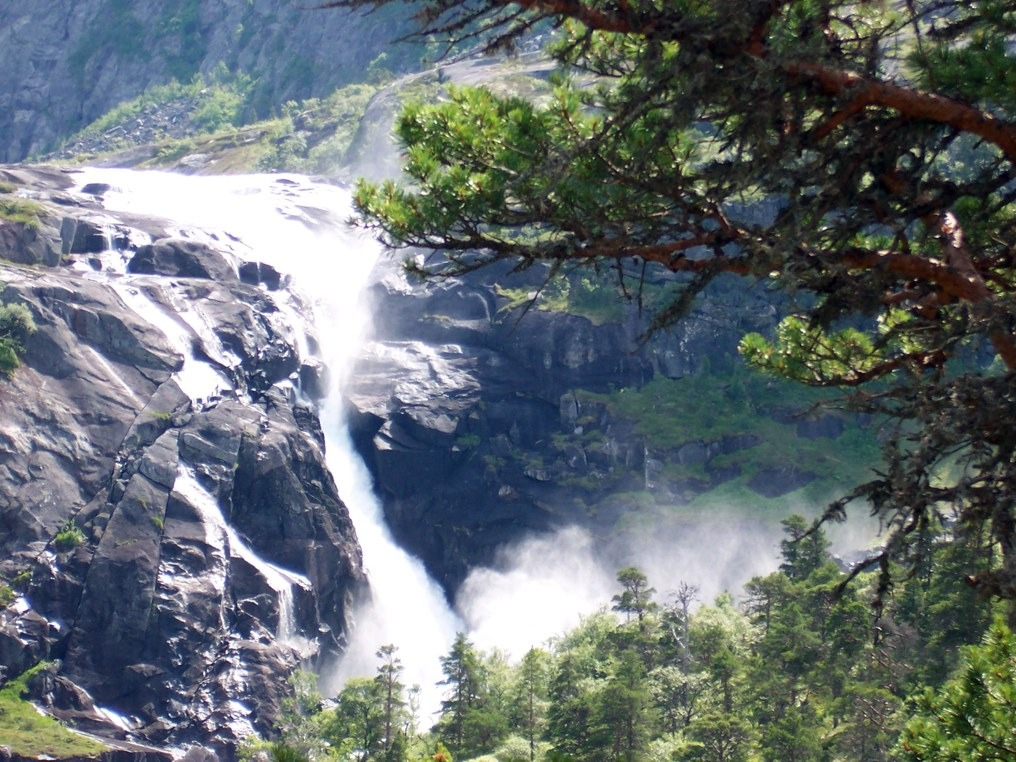
Nykkjesøyfossen falls, 160 feet

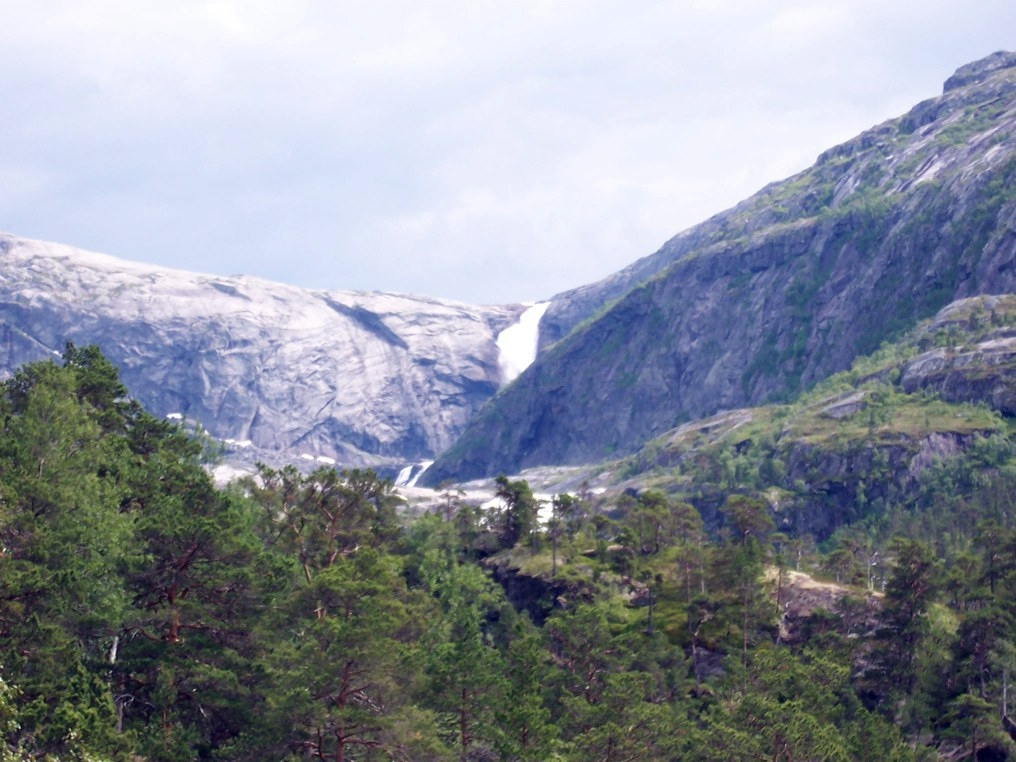
Søtefossen falls, 807 feet

== Economy ==
The Hardanger Bestikk factory has been producing cutlery (flatware) in Kinsarvik since 1958. The factory employs about 50 people.

=== Tourism ===
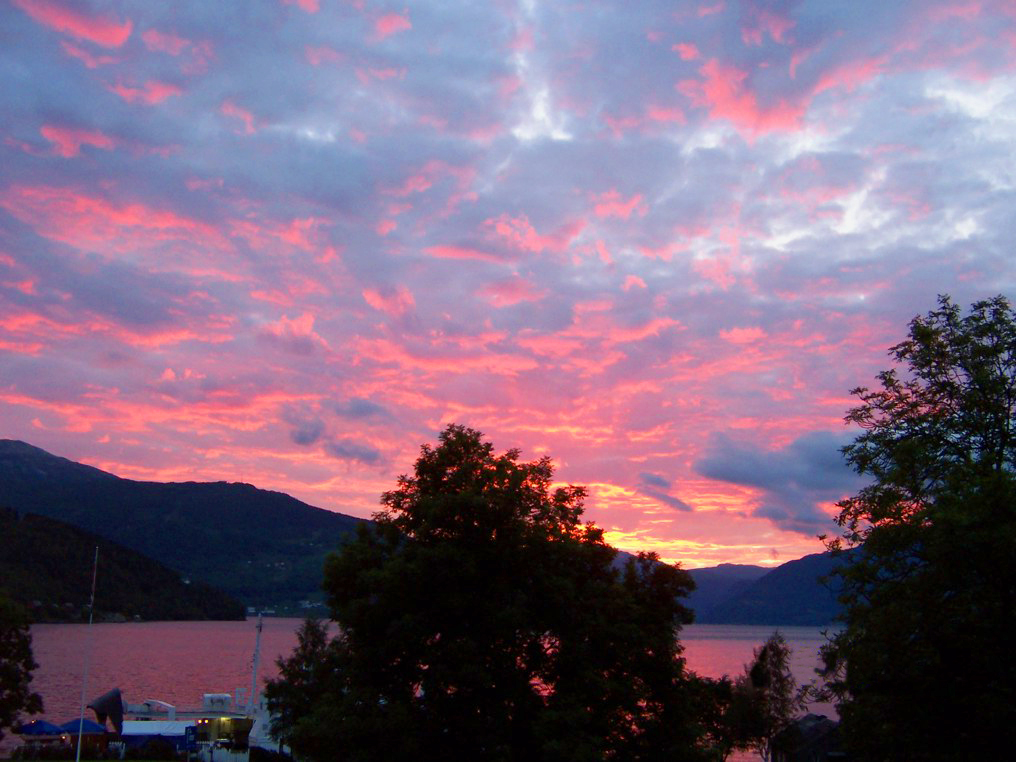
Summer Midnight at Kinsarvik

The history of Kinsarvik tourism has been one of dramatic changes. Up until the 1970s, the village was the busiest ferry port in Norway and a crucial junction on the only all-year road connecting the main cities of Bergen and Oslo. More recently, however, alternative routes have eroded its importance a little. In 2006 the Norwegian Parliament approved the Hardanger Bridge, a monumental bridge located only 12 kilometres (7.5 mi) north of Kinsarvik. The bridge was completed in 2013 and since then, Kinsarvik is no longer part of the dominant route and tourist stop for both east–west and north–south traffic.

Kinsarvik functions as a base camp for tourists visiting the surrounding areas and has several camping grounds and a hotel. Kinsarvik Båthavn is a small marina located in the village..

The shores of the fjords in this area are thick with fruit trees, primarily cherry and apple trees. There are spikes in tourism for the flowering and harvest of these trees.

== History ==
=== Vikings ===
In the time of Julius Caesar, a clan known as Charudes was reported to live in the Jutland region of Denmark. The people were reported to be involved in many battles and thereby had a tradition of warfare. About the time of the fall of Rome and the arrival of the Huns, there was a great movement of people in Europe. The Charudes were squeezed between the Angles, Saxons, and the Jutes. It has been theorised that the clan, which was by now referred to as Horder or Harding left Denmark and settled in Scotland, Iceland, and the area around what is now Kinsarvik, setting up an independent kingship. The county of Vestland and the region of Hardanger are thought to be named for this people.

The shores of the Hardangerfjord are steep and rocky. The gradual earthen banks at the mouth of the Kinso River were an important place for the building and repair of the Longship. Any attack on Kinsarvik would have to be made by ship. The area was backed by the glaciers of the Hardangervidda and on the east any land force would have to go around the long, narrow, and deep waters of the Sørfjord or Eid Fjord. It was an ideal defensive position for Vikings.

=== Christianity ===
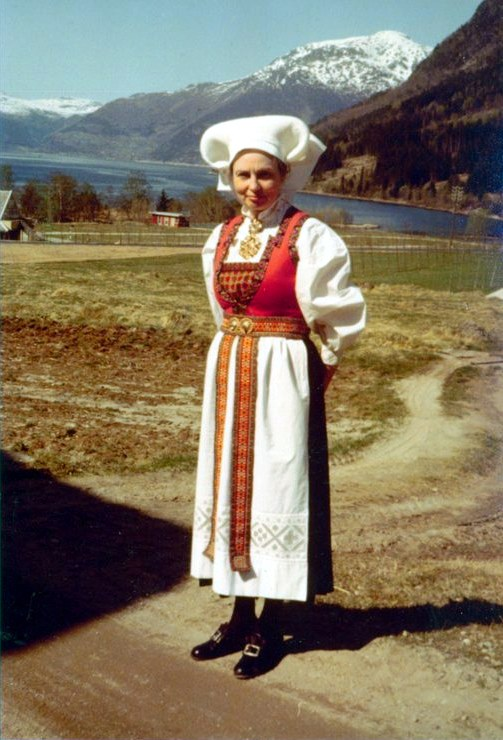
Kinsarvik-style bunad (traditional dress)

Christianity arrived in the 11th century, and the wooden Kinsarvik Church was built at Kinsarvik, which was an important economic centre in the region of inner Hardanger. In 1160, a stone church was erected in its place. That building is still standing, making it one of the oldest stone churches in Norway.

Christianity also brought English settlers with Apple rootstock. The English also brought the art of grafting to the fruit industry of Hardanger about 1300. The area around Kinsarvik is well suited for growing fruit and its practice expanded.

In the Middle Ages, Kinsarvik Church was the site of a market, the legal magistrates, as well as a religious center for the region. In the winters, the ship masts and sails for the boats in the area were stored in the church attic.

By 1536, the Protestant Reformation was underway. The first church in Norway to convert was Ullensvang Church just about 10 kilometres (6.2 mi) south of Kinsarvik. At this time the Catholic paintings and frescos of Kinsarvik Church were whitewashed. In the 17th century, the woodwork of the church was painted. In 1961, the original frescos were uncovered and the church was restored to its Catholic appearance including a fresco of the Archangel Gabriel weighing souls.

=== Sámi ===
Archaeological studies have shown that reindeer and the hunting of reindeer on the Hardangervidda was well established in the iron (Viking) age and Middle Ages.

However, the current reindeer herds on the Hardangervidda plateau do not originate from the old Reindeer population which occupied all the high plateaus in pre-historian times, but the present herd is a result of early 1900 initiatives with reindeer herding on the Hardangervidda. For this both reindeer and sami (herders) were brought to the area. The reindeer herding on the Hardangervidda did not succeed and the reindeers either escaped or were let loose. Some of the Sami herders settled down in Kinsarvik, but more so in Eidfjord, the municipality to the north of Kinsarvik.
