= Alsåker =

Village in Ullensvang Municipality, Norway

- Village
- Interactive map of Alsåker
- Coordinates: 60.39123°N 6.50207°E
- Country: Norway
- Region: Western Norway
- County: Vestland
- District: Hardanger
- Municipality: Ullensvang Municipality
- Elevation: 25 m (82 ft)
- Time zone: UTC+01:00 (CET)
  - Summer (DST): UTC+02:00 (CEST)
- Post Code: 5778 Utne

Alsåker is a village in Ullensvang Municipality in Vestland county, Norway. The village lies on the Folgefonna Peninsula, along the shore of the Hardangerfjorden. The village lies about 10 kilometres (6.2 mi) southwest of the village of Utne and about 25 kilometres (16 mi) northeast of the village of Jondal.
