= Utne =

Village in Ullensvang Municipality, Norway

- Village
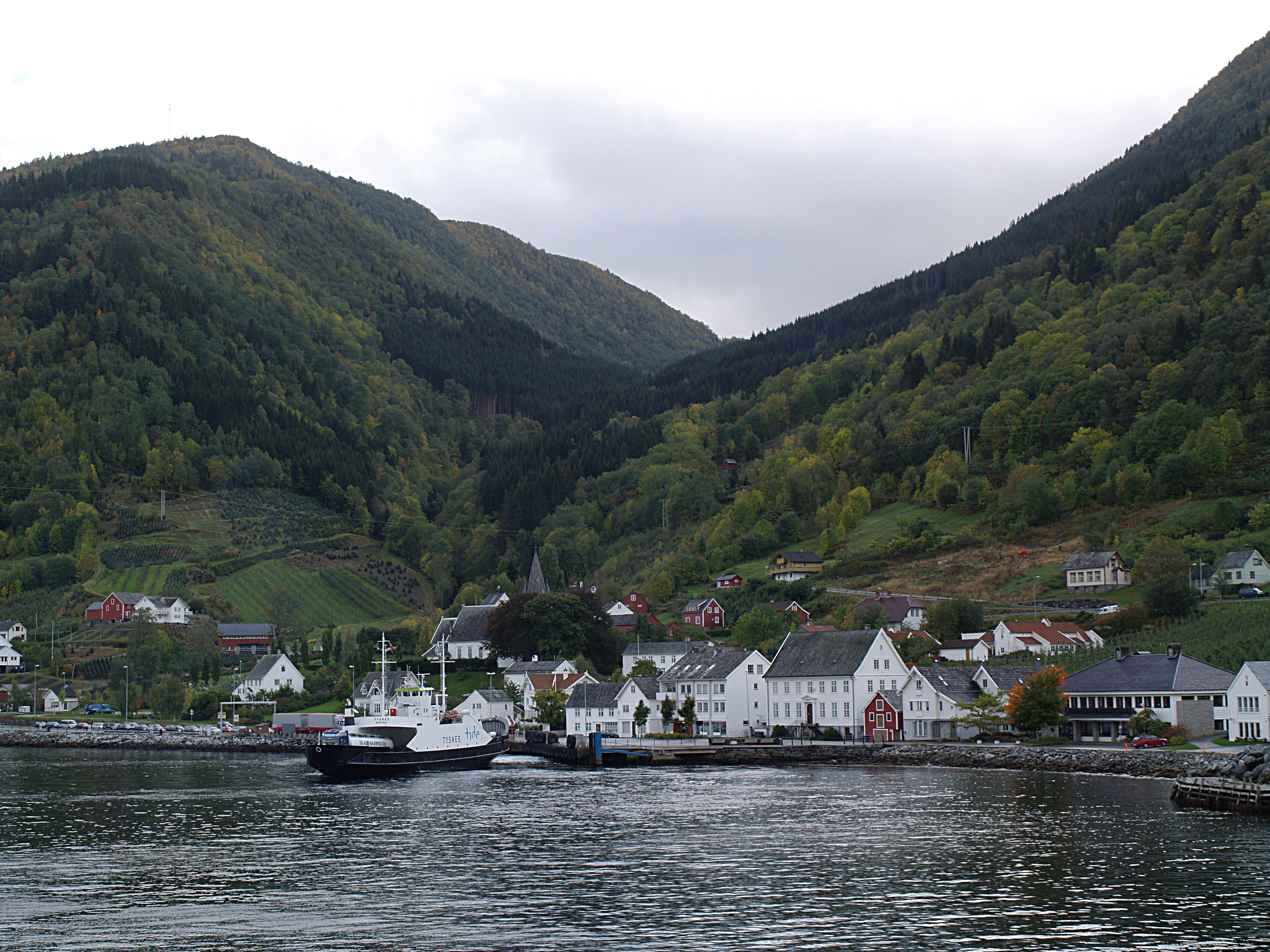
- View of the village
- Interactive map of Utne
- Coordinates: 60.42268°N 6.62446°E
- Country: Norway
- Region: Western Norway
- County: Vestland
- District: Hardanger
- Municipality: Ullensvang Municipality
- Elevation: 5 m (16 ft)
- Time zone: UTC+01:00 (CET)
  - Summer (DST): UTC+02:00 (CEST)
- Post Code: 5778 Utne

Utne is a village in Ullensvang Municipality in the Hardanger region of Vestland county, Norway. The village is located on the northern end of the Folgefonna Peninsula, at the confluence of the Sørfjorden and Hardangerfjorden. The village is the site of Utne Church. The village of Alsåker lies about 10 kilometres (6.2 mi) to the west on the northern shore of the peninsula and the village of Vikebygd lies about 20 kilometres (12 mi) to the south along the eastern shore of the peninsula.

Utne is a ferry port with regular ferry routes from Kinsarvik to Kvanndal via Utne, connecting the two sides of the fjord. Utne is also home to the Utne Hotel, Norway's oldest hotel in continuous operation, founded in 1722.

== Name ==
Utne, in Norwegian, probably has some pre-Germanic elements (i.e. before approx. 200 CE). Other place-names in the area also has an element of pre-Germanic and unknown origins. It has been suggested that it derives from "Út-tún", meaning the hamlet or farmstead that is "out". This fits with the village's position at the tip of a peninsula that sticks out into the Hardangerfjorden. This is however uncertain.

== Media gallery ==
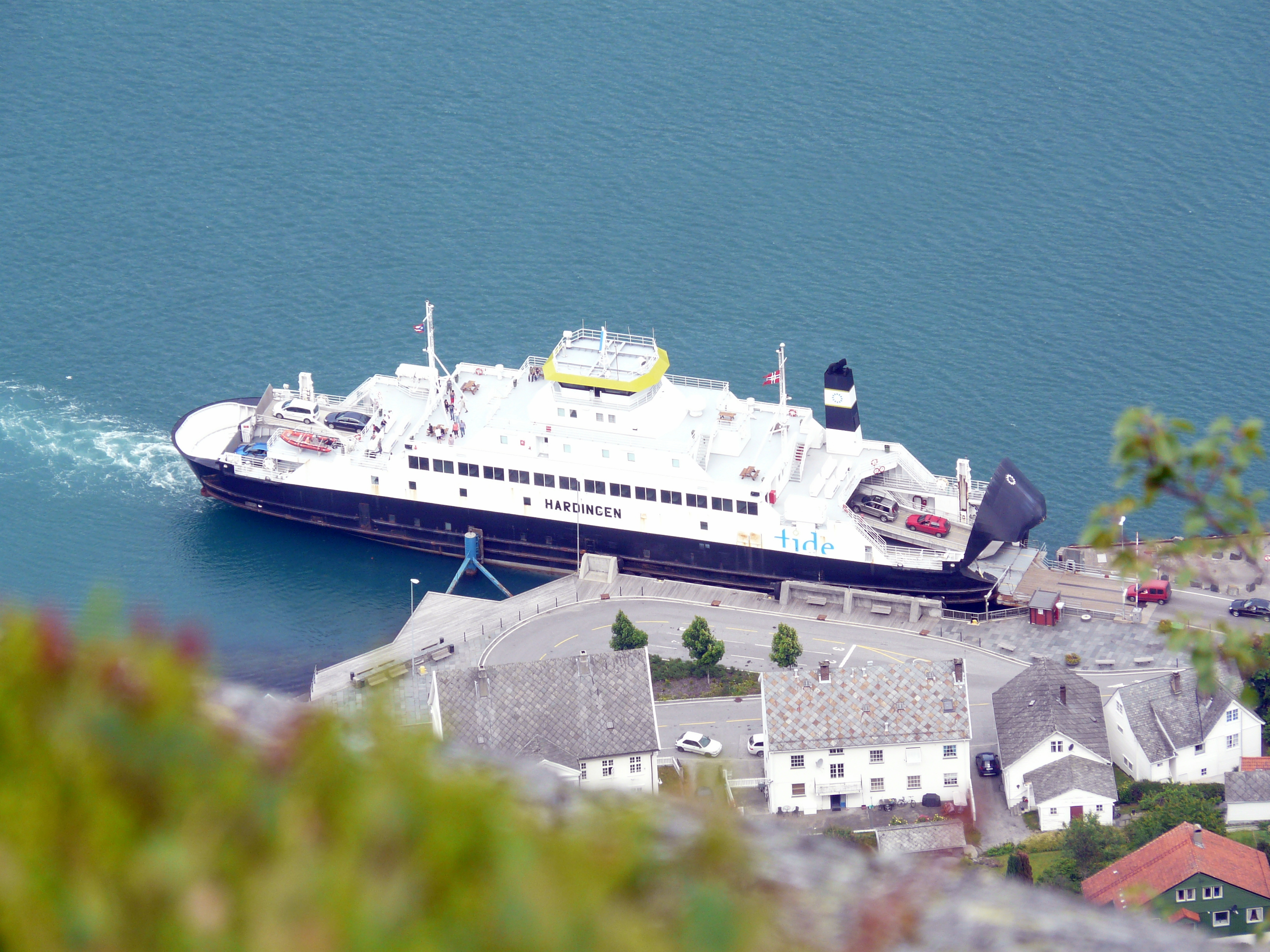
The ferry stopped at Utne

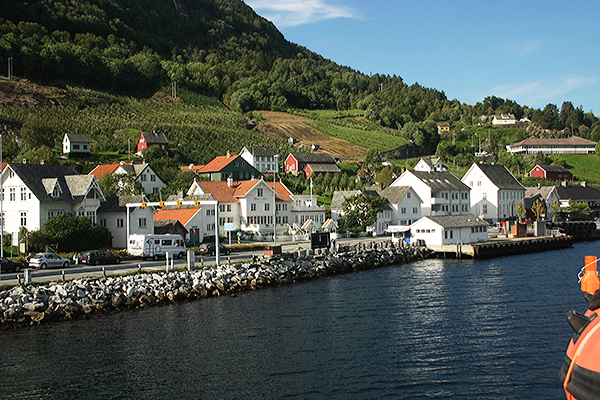
View of Utne from the ferry

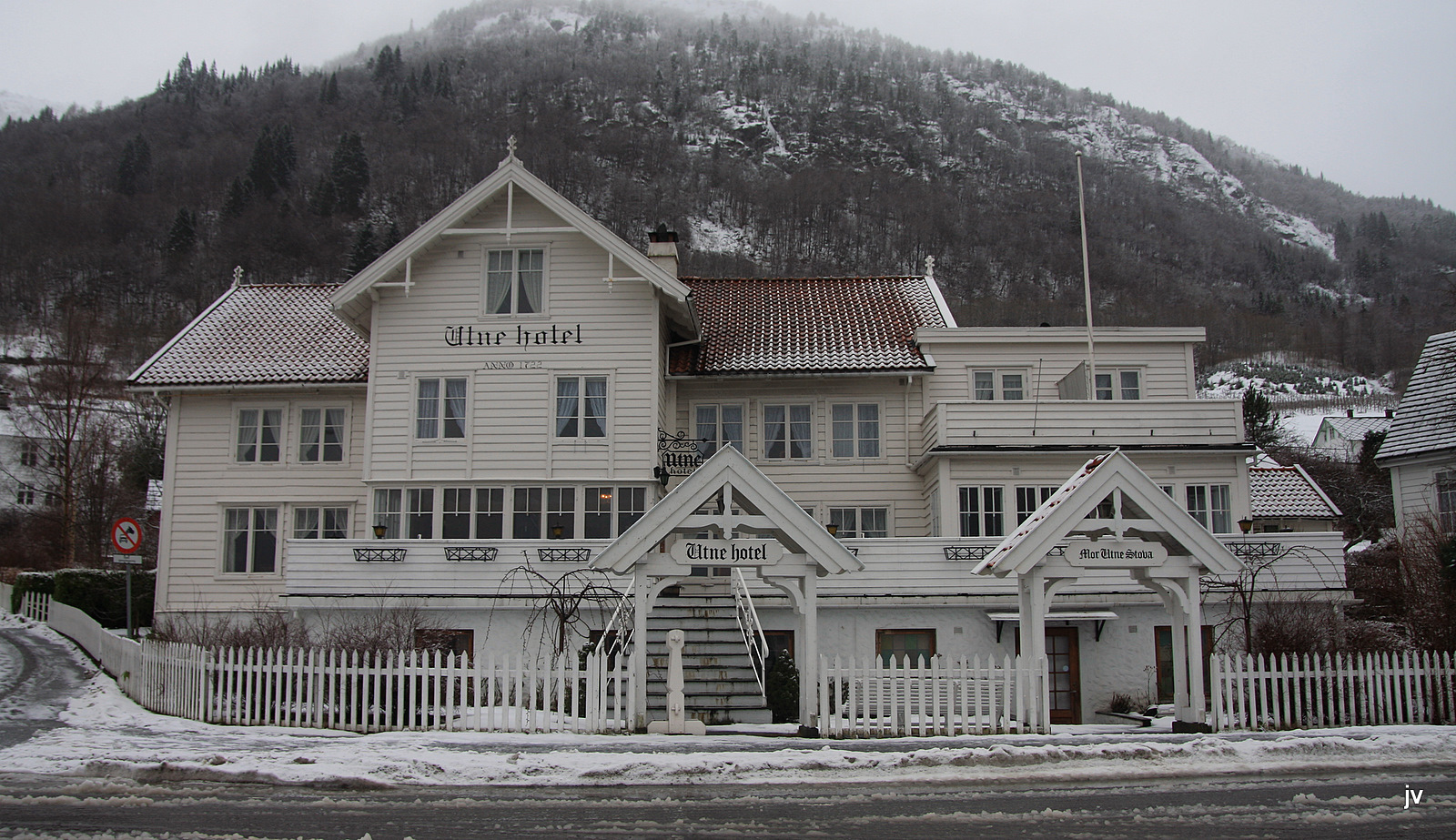
Utne hotel

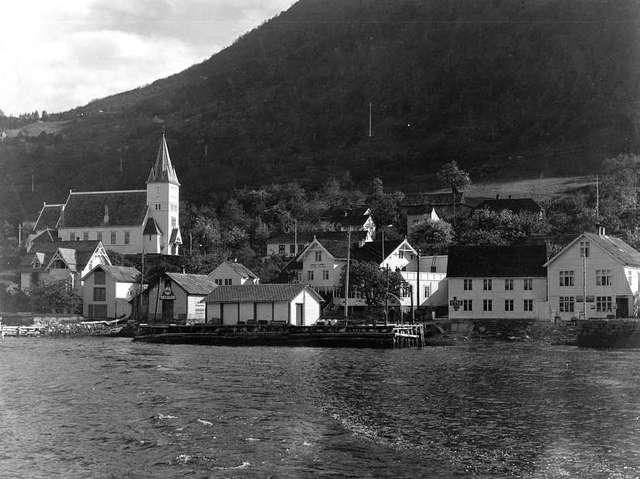
Utne in 1933

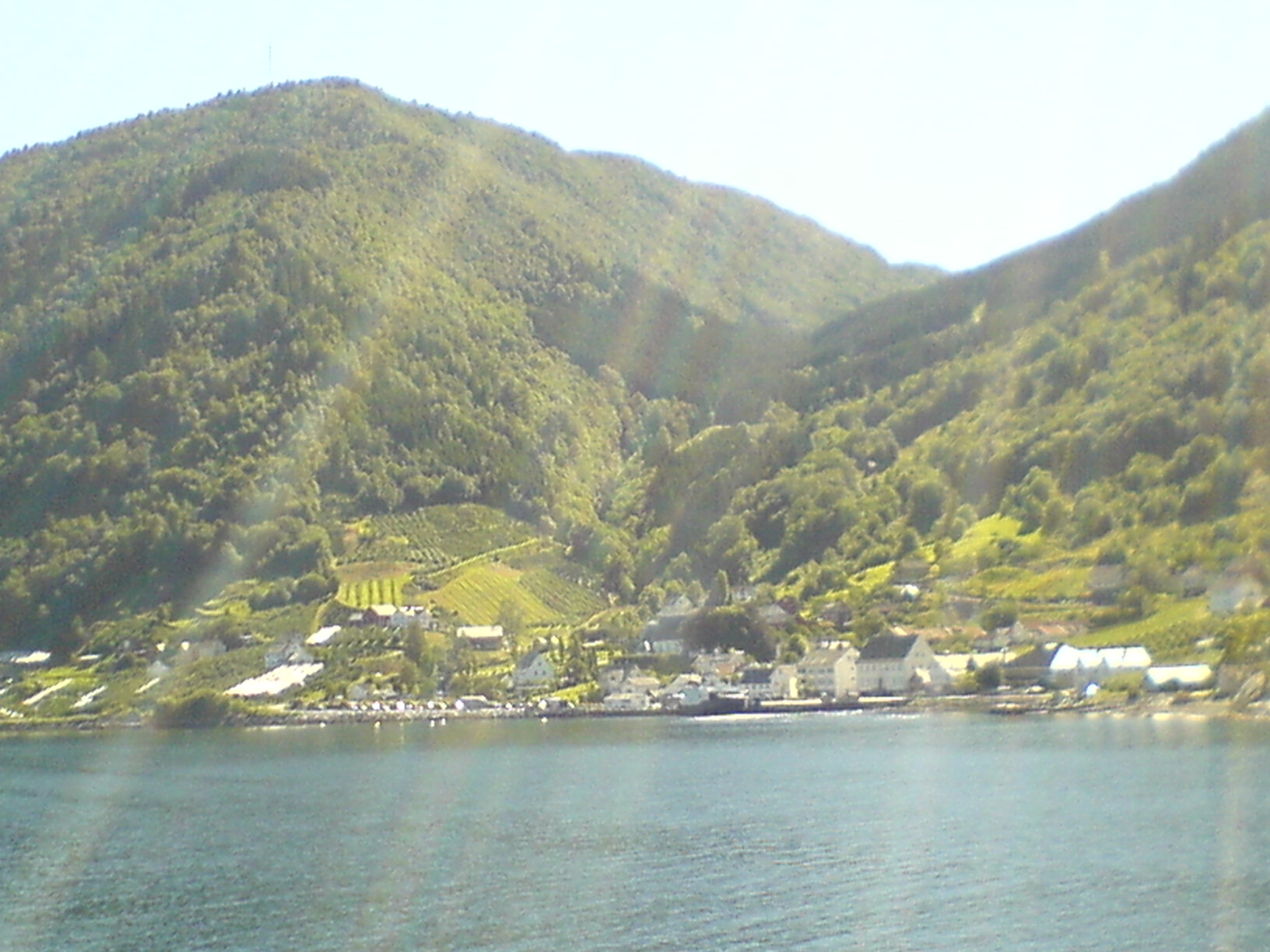
Utne as seen from ferry during summer
