= Utne Church =

Church in Vestland, Norway

- Utne kyrkje
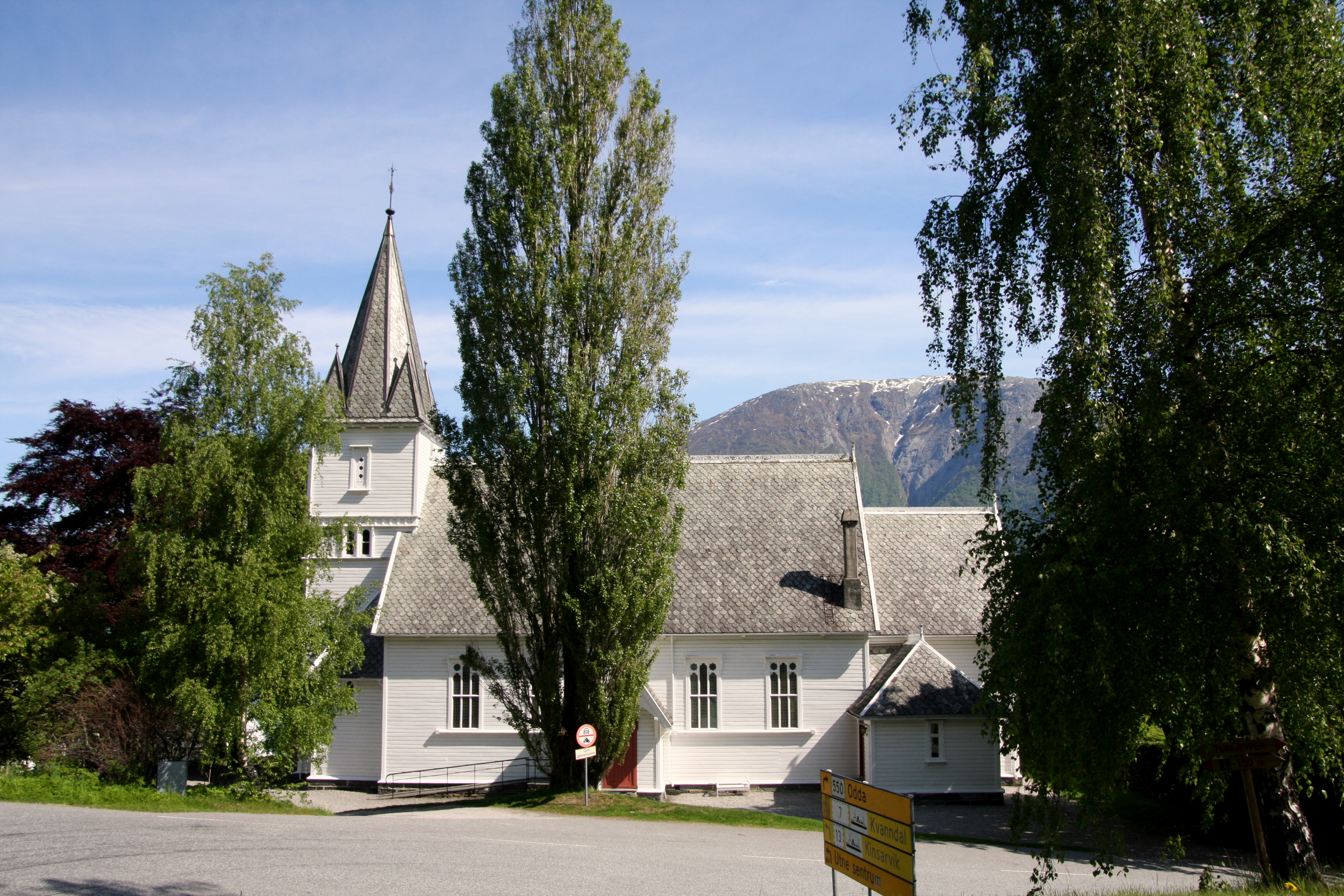
- View of the church
- Utne Church
- 60°25′22″N 6°37′19″E
- Location: Ullensvang, Vestland
- Country: Norway
- Denomination: Church of Norway
- Churchmanship: Evangelical Lutheran

History
- Status: Parish church
- Founded: 1895
- Consecrated: 5 June 1895

Architecture
- Functional status: Active
- Architect: Peter Andreas Blix
- Architectural type: Long church
- Completed: 1895 (131 years ago)

Specifications
- Capacity: 300
- Materials: Wood

Administration
- Diocese: Bjørgvin bispedømme
- Deanery: Hardanger og Voss prosti
- Parish: Utne
- Norwegian Cultural Heritage Site
- Type: Church
- Status: Listed
- ID: 85733

Utne Church (Norwegian: Utne kyrkje) is a parish church of the Church of Norway in Ullensvang Municipality in Vestland county, Norway. It is located in the village of Utne, at the northern tip of the Folgefonna peninsula. It is the church for the Utne parish which is part of the Hardanger og Voss prosti (deanery) in the Diocese of Bjørgvin. The white, wooden church was built in a long church design from 1892 until 1895 using plans drawn up by the architect Peter Andreas Blix. The church seats about 300 people.

== History ==
Permission for building a church in Utne was first given on 14 October 1885. In 1886, a piece of land was designated as the cemetery for the future church. The first church built in Utne was built from 1892-1895. The architect was Peter Andreas Blix and the lead builder was Ivar Ivarsson Opedal. The nave of the church is 19 by 10.2 metres (62 ft × 33 ft) and the choir is 6.5 by 6.32 metres (21.3 ft × 20.7 ft). The church porch in the west measured 4.5 by 4.25 metres (14.8 ft × 13.9 ft) and there was also a small 5.1-by-4.15-metre (16.7 ft × 13.6 ft) sacristy off the chancel. The church was consecrated on 5 June 1895 by the Bishop Fredrik Waldemar Hvoslef.

== Media gallery ==
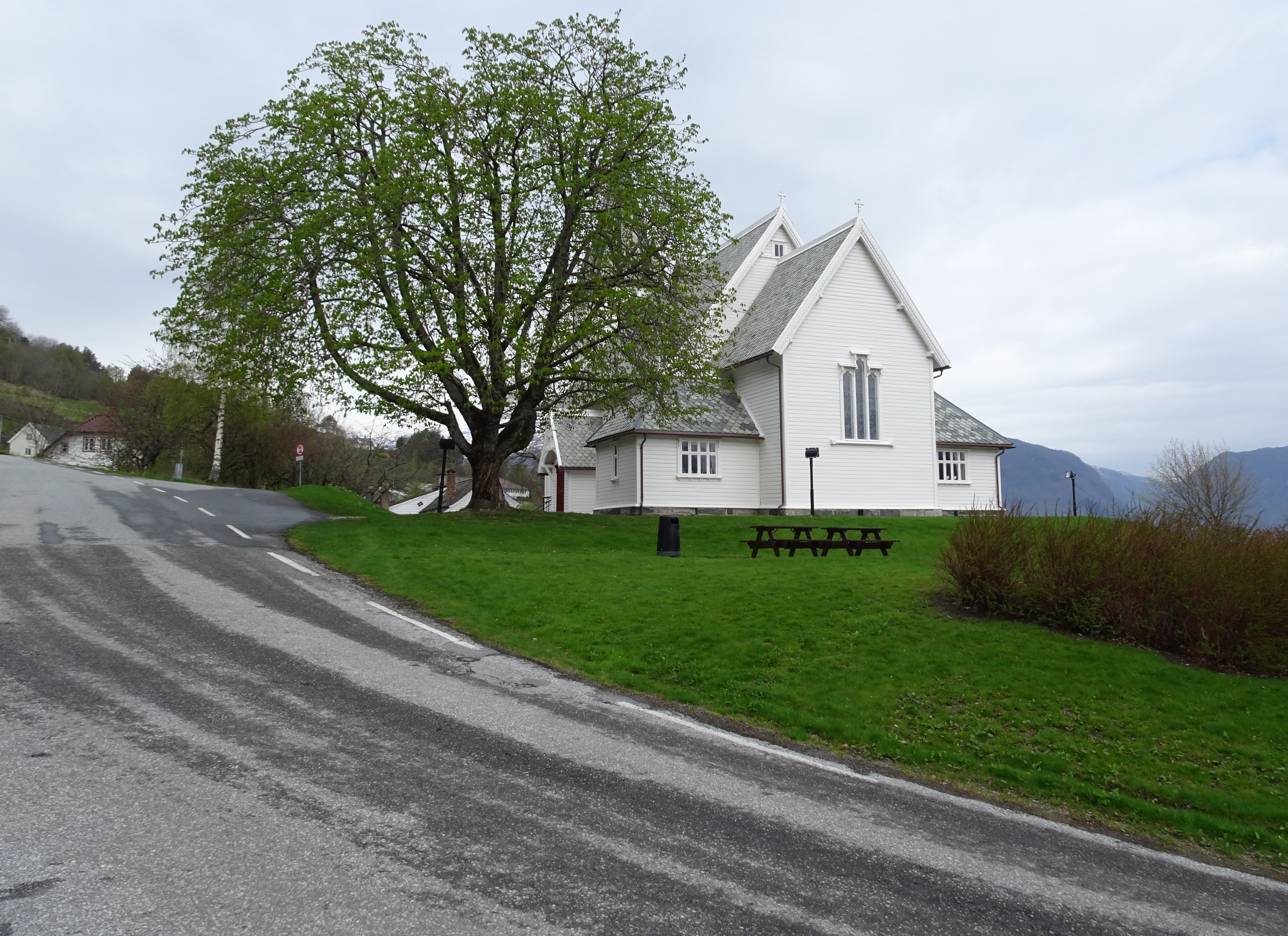

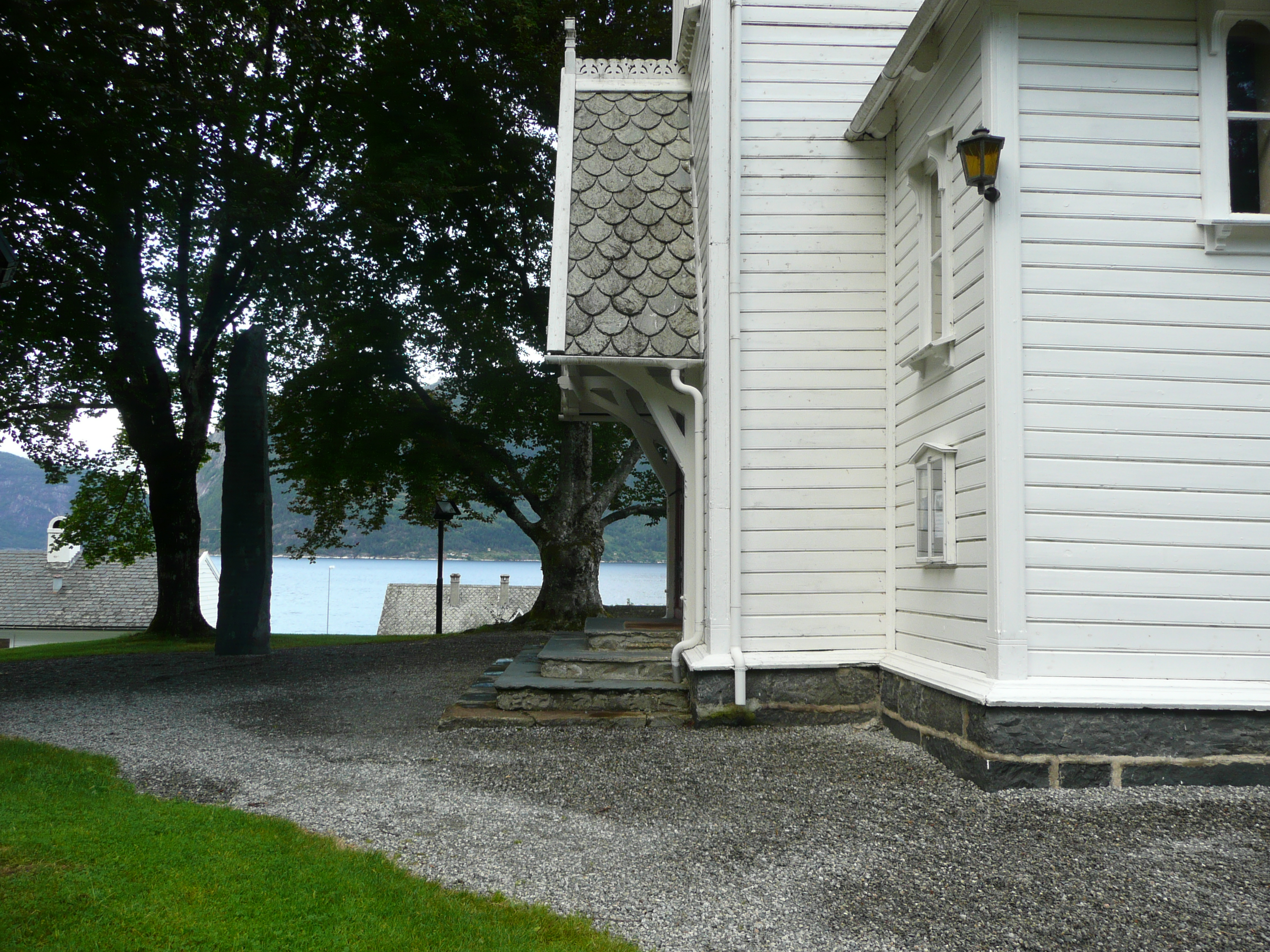

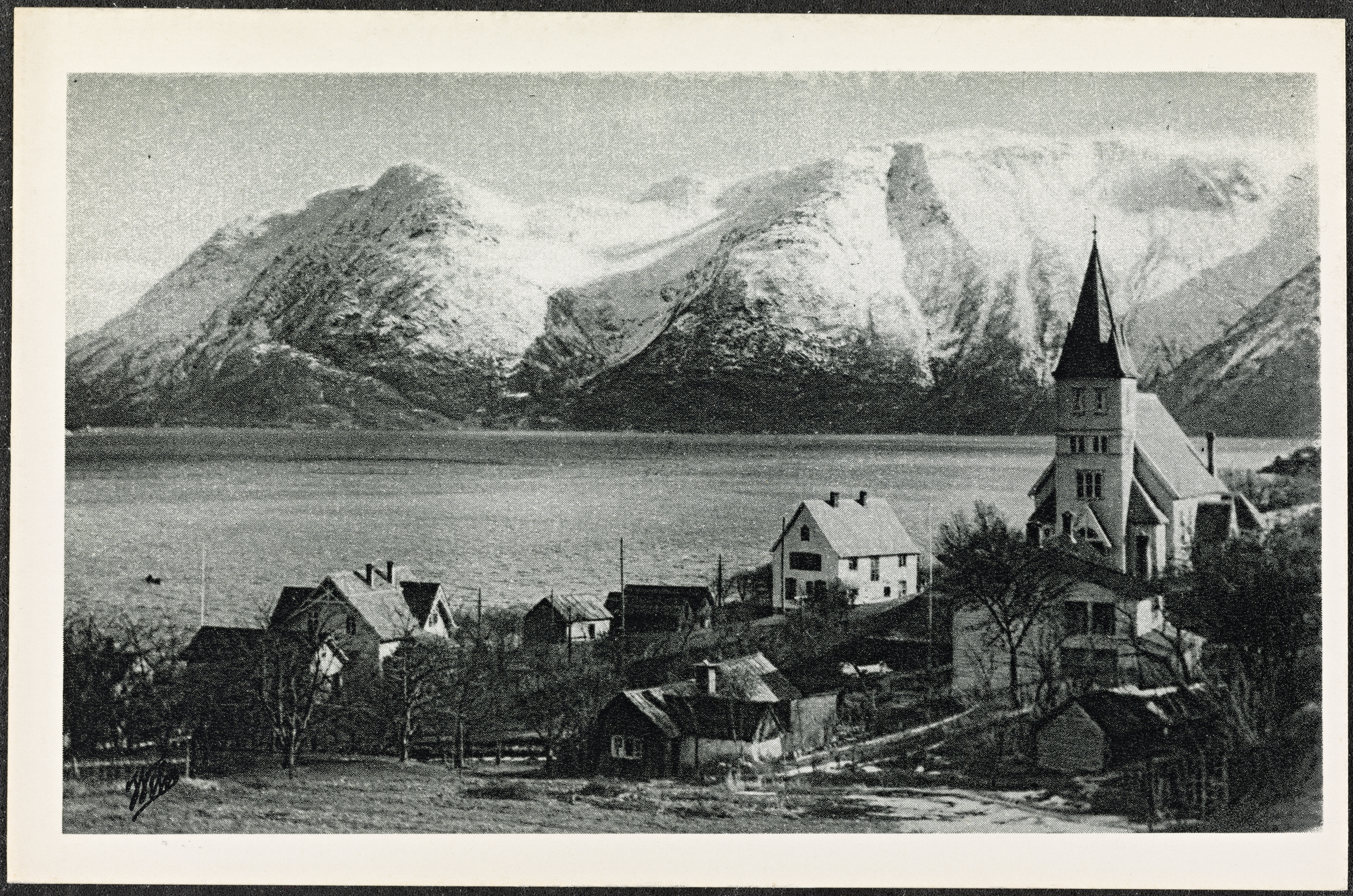

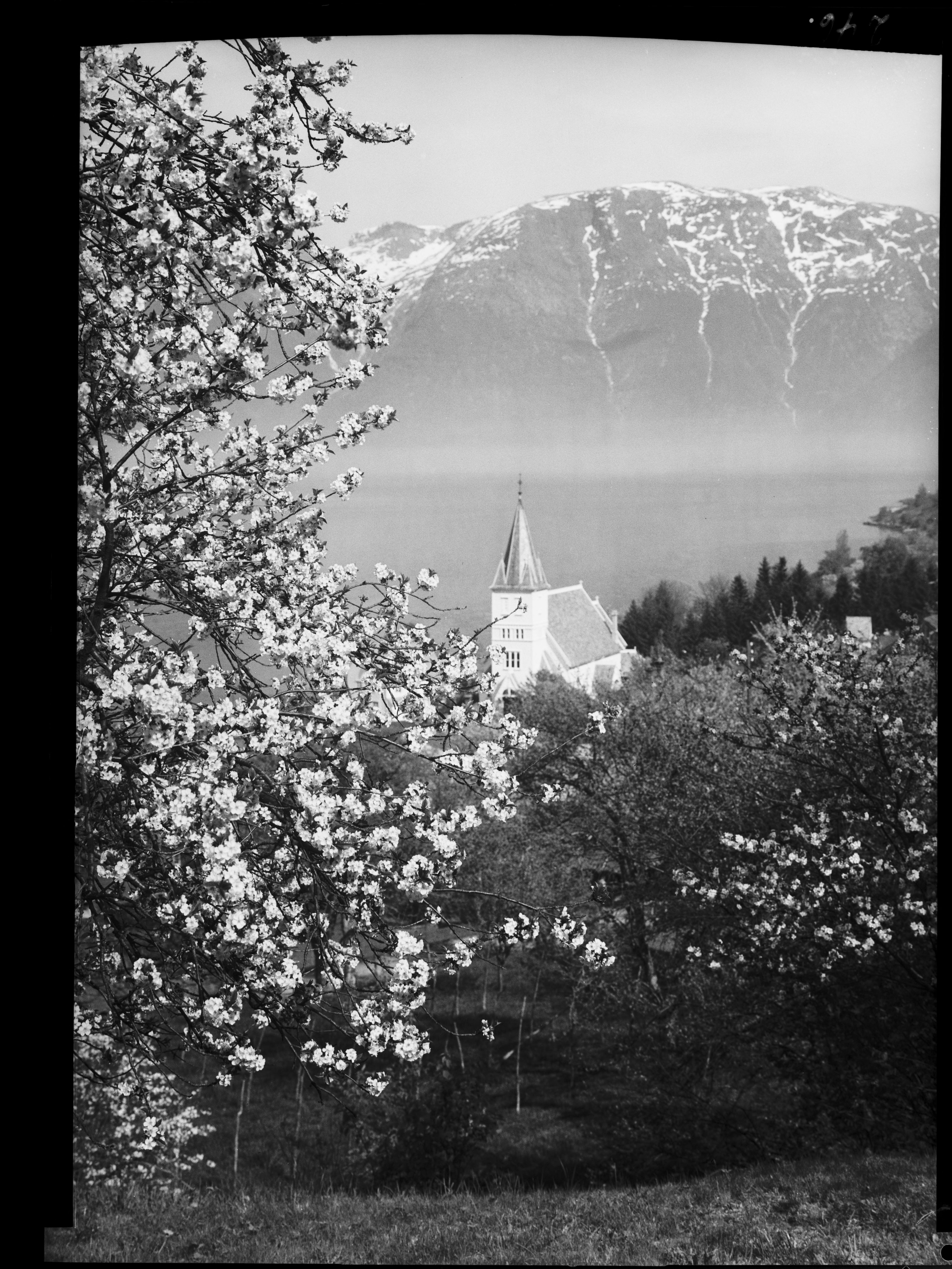

== See also ==
- List of churches in Bjørgvin
