= Kinsarvik Church =

Church in Vestland, Norway

- Kinsarvik kyrkje
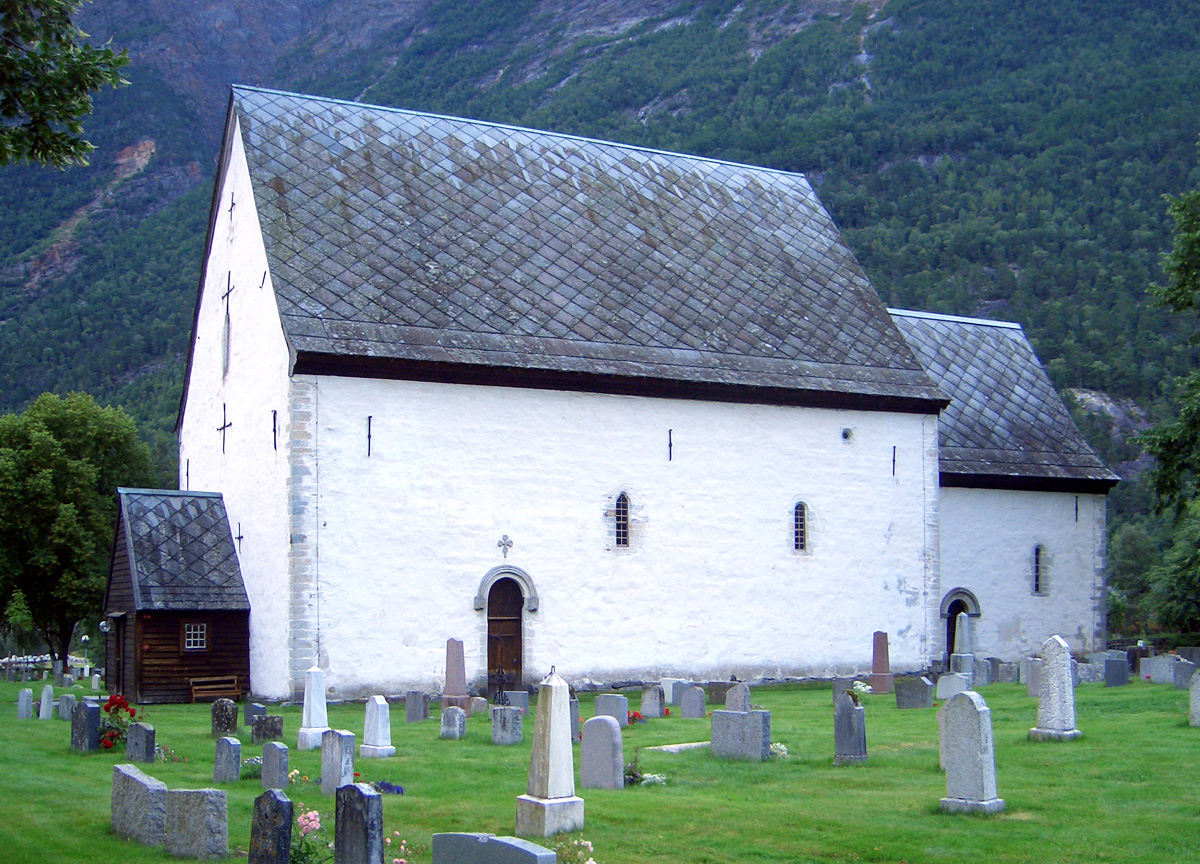
- View of the church
- Kinsarvik Church
- 60°22′35″N 6°43′19″E
- Location: Ullensvang, Vestland
- Country: Norway
- Denomination: Church of Norway
- Previous denomination: Catholic Church
- Churchmanship: Evangelical Lutheran

History
- Status: Parish church
- Founded: c. 1050
- Consecrated: c. 1160

Architecture
- Functional status: Active
- Architectural type: Long church
- Style: Romanesque
- Completed: c. 1160 (866 years ago)

Specifications
- Capacity: 240
- Materials: Stone

Administration
- Diocese: Bjørgvin bispedømme
- Deanery: Hardanger og Voss prosti
- Parish: Kinsarvik
- Norwegian Cultural Heritage Site
- Type: Church
- Status: Automatically protected
- ID: 84775

Kinsarvik Church (Norwegian: Kinsarvik kyrkje) is a parish church of the Church of Norway in Ullensvang Municipality in Vestland county, Norway. It is located in the village of Kinsarvik. It is the church for the Kinsarvik parish which is part of the Hardanger og Voss prosti (deanery) in the Diocese of Bjørgvin. The gray stone church was built in a long church design around the year 1160 using plans drawn up by an unknown architect. The church seats about 240 people.

It is the oldest stone church in the whole Hardanger region, and at one time, it was one of the four main churches for all of the old Hordafylke county.

== History ==
The earliest existing historical records of the church date back to the year 1298, but the church was not new that year. The first church in Kinsarvik was a wooden post church that was built on this site around the year 1050. It was the first wooden church to be built in all of the Hardanger region. The church had a nave that measured about 8 by 5.8 metres (26 ft × 19 ft) and a smaller choir with unknown dimensions.

Around the year 1160, the wooden church was torn down and a new stone church was built on the same site (an alternate theory is that the stone church was built around the wooden church, which was removed after the stone church enclosed it). Remains of the previous wooden church have been found under the present church. The new church was built in a Romanesque style. The church has a rectangular nave and a narrower, almost square chancel. The foundation walls of the new stone church were built about 1.5 metres (4 ft 11 in) wide. Archaeological investigations have found that there was a fire in the church, likely around the year 1180. This was around the time when the Birkebeiners ravaged Hordaland county as they were fighting for power. The church was originally built without a choir. After the fire, the church was repaired and a new choir was built, probably in the early 13th century. High up on the west gable is a window opening leading into the church attic. It is here that they used to hoist the local ship sails and masts to store during the winters.

The church underwent an extensive restoration in 1880 under the direction of architect Christian Christie. Much of the newer furniture was then taken away, and the building was given a medieval feel. The nave measures 17 by 11.7 metres (56 ft × 38 ft) and the choir measures 8.1 by 7 metres (27 ft × 23 ft). In 1960, a wooden church porch measuring 2.8 by 4.1 metres (9 ft 2 in × 13 ft 5 in) was built on the west end of the nave.

== Media gallery ==
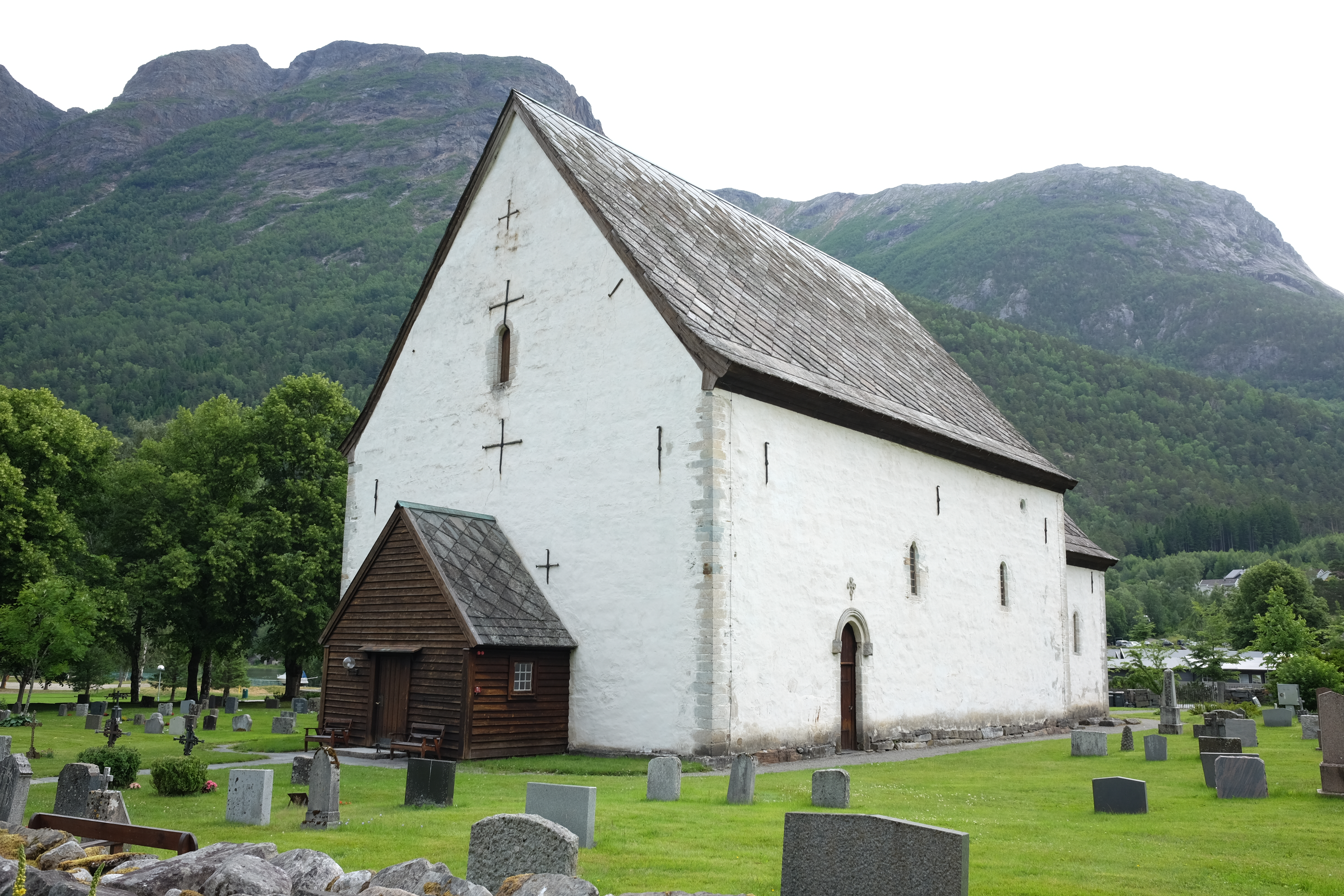

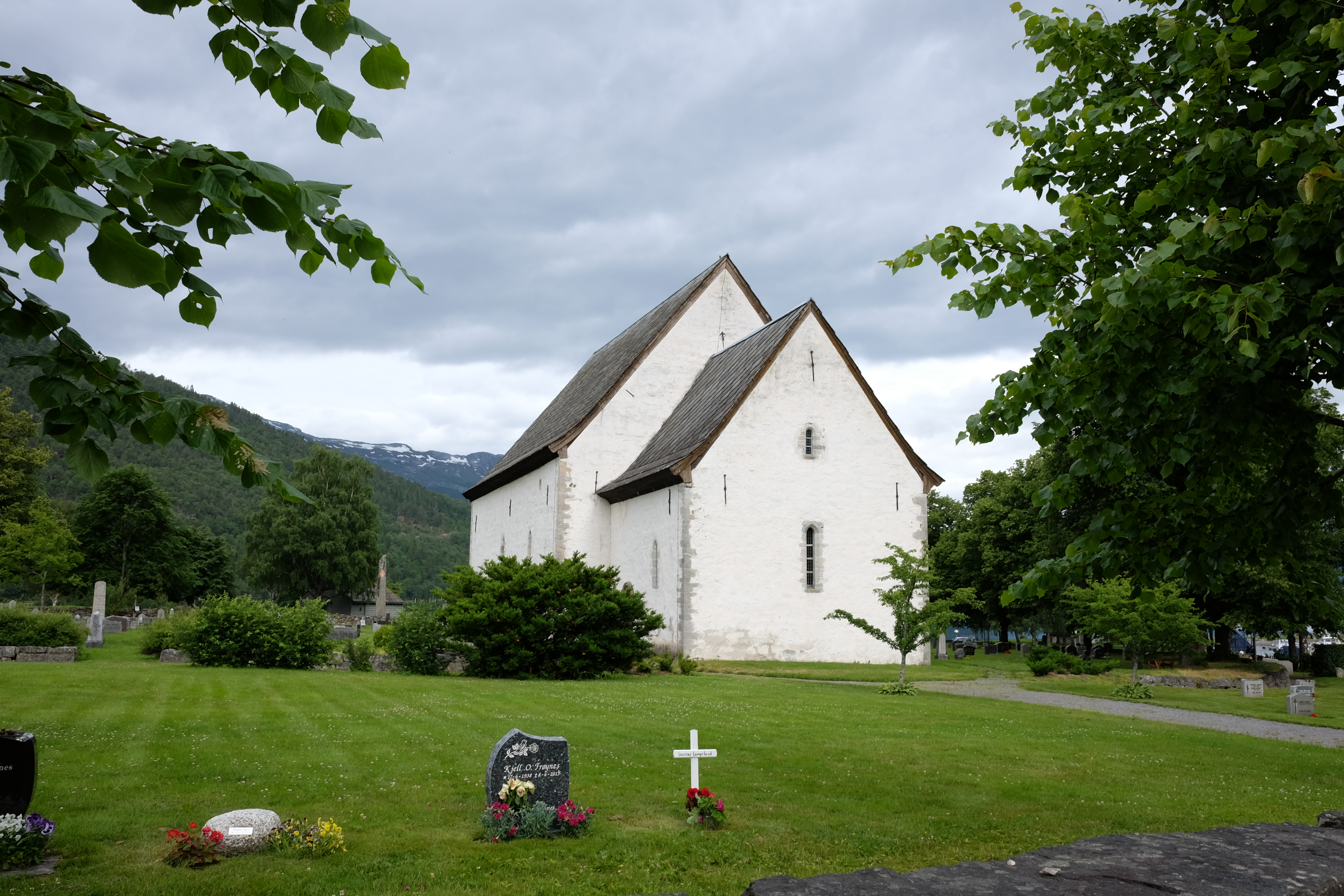

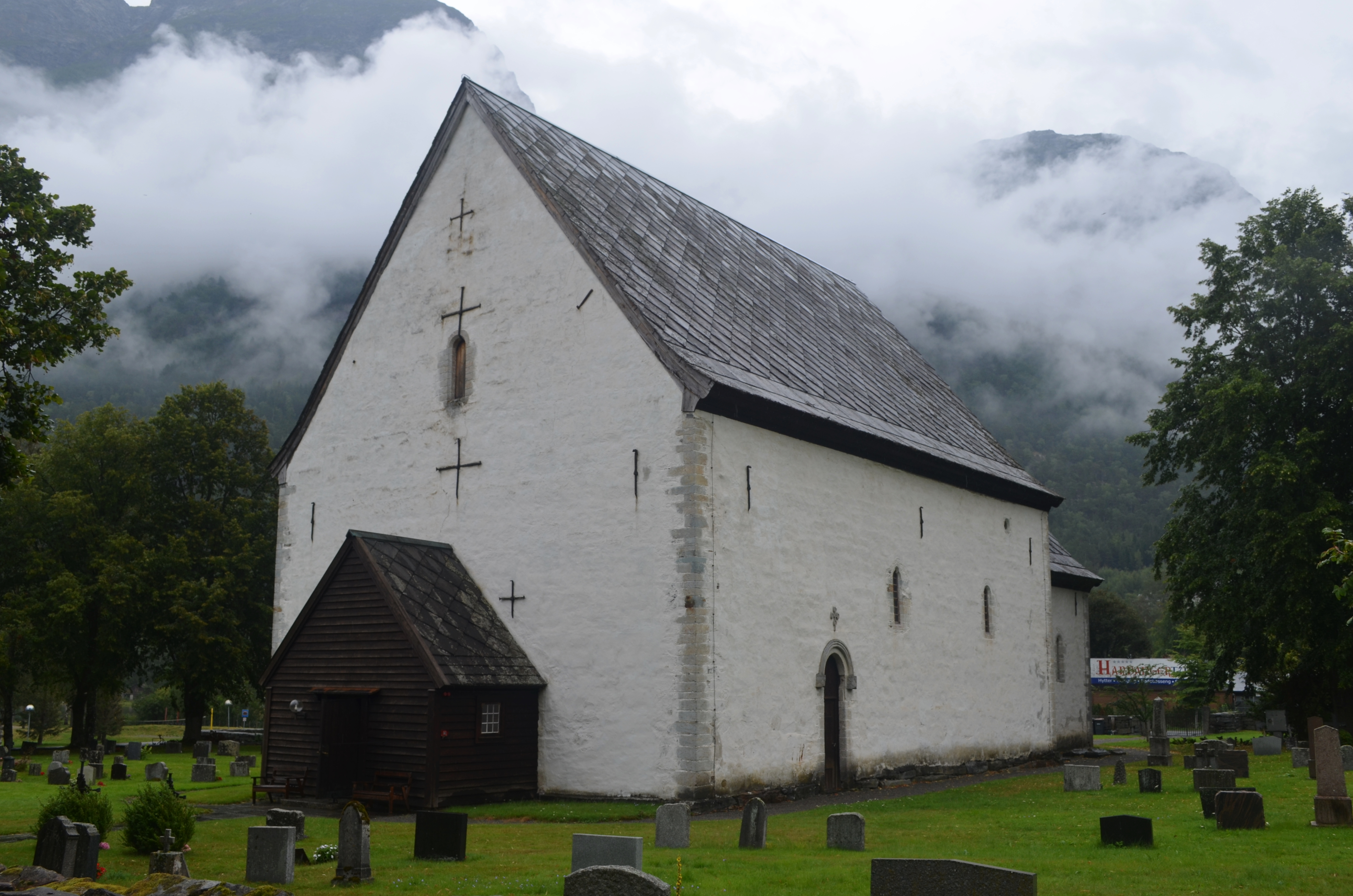

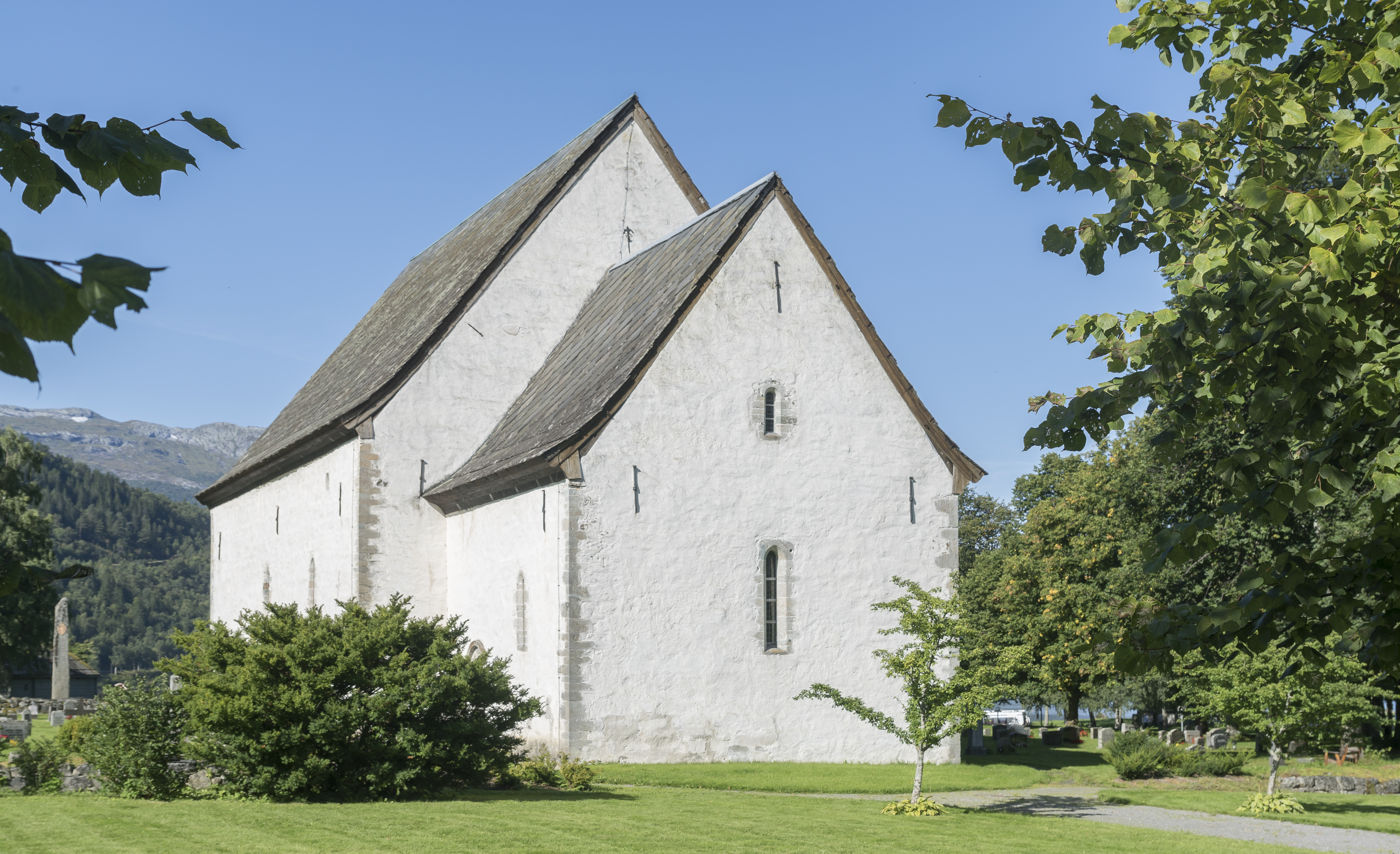

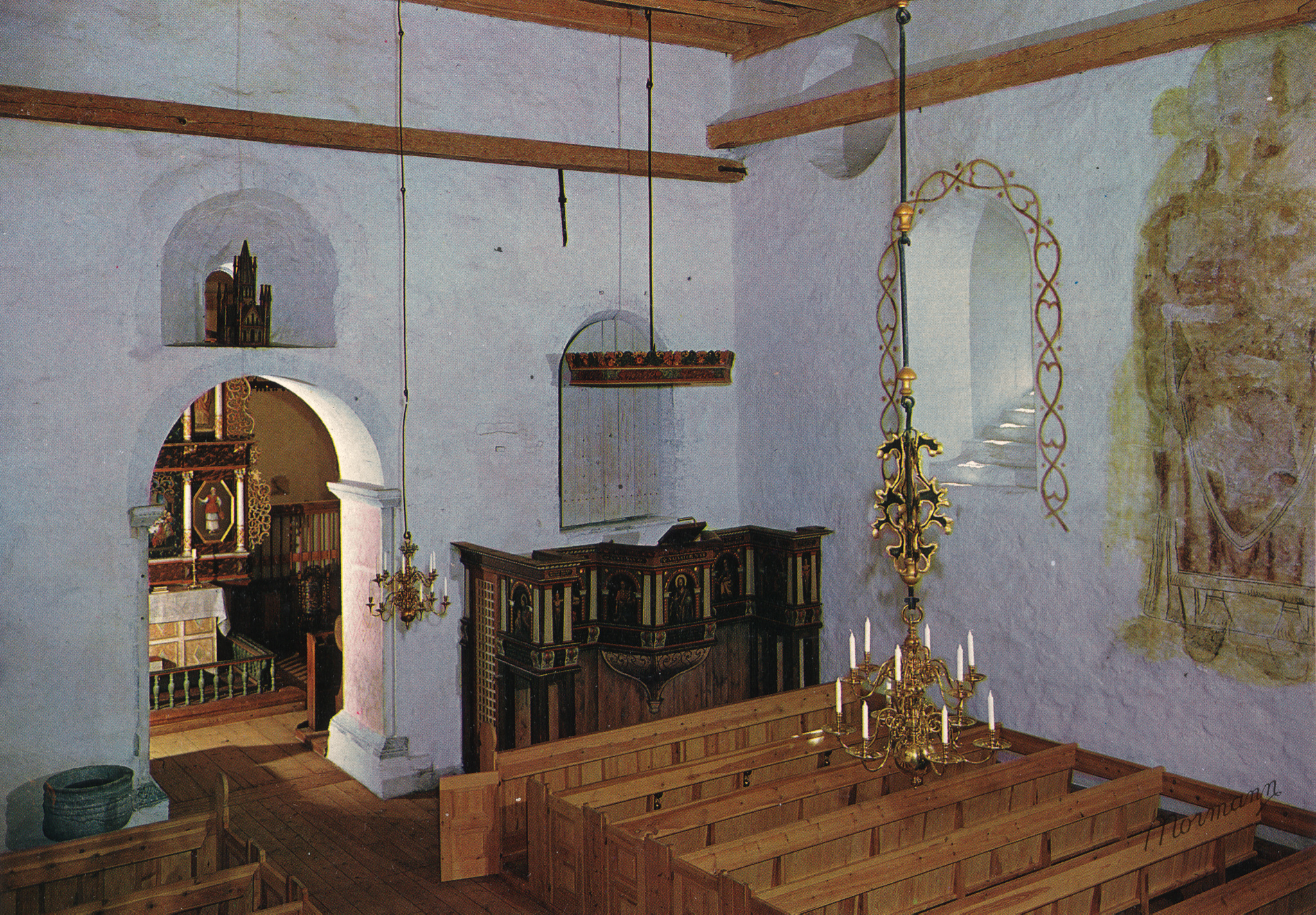

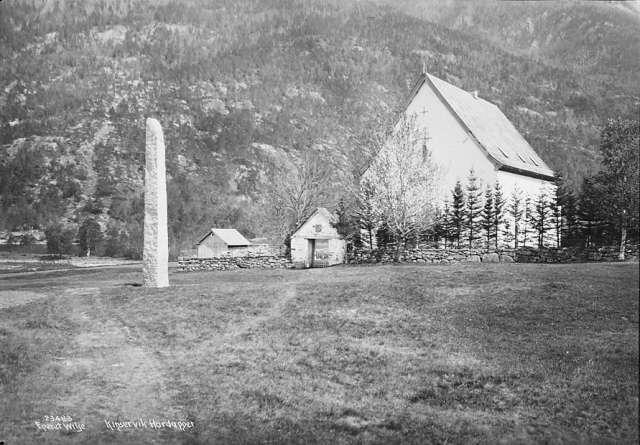

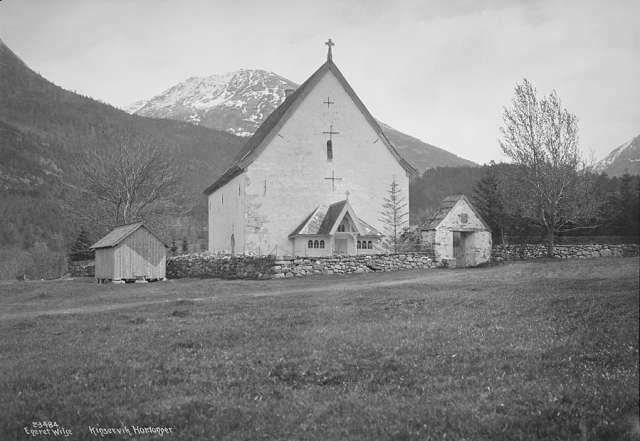

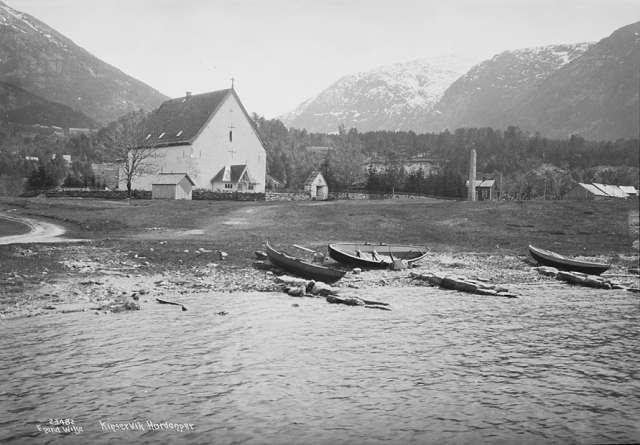

== See also ==
- List of churches in Bjørgvin
