= Veig =

River in Vestland, Norway

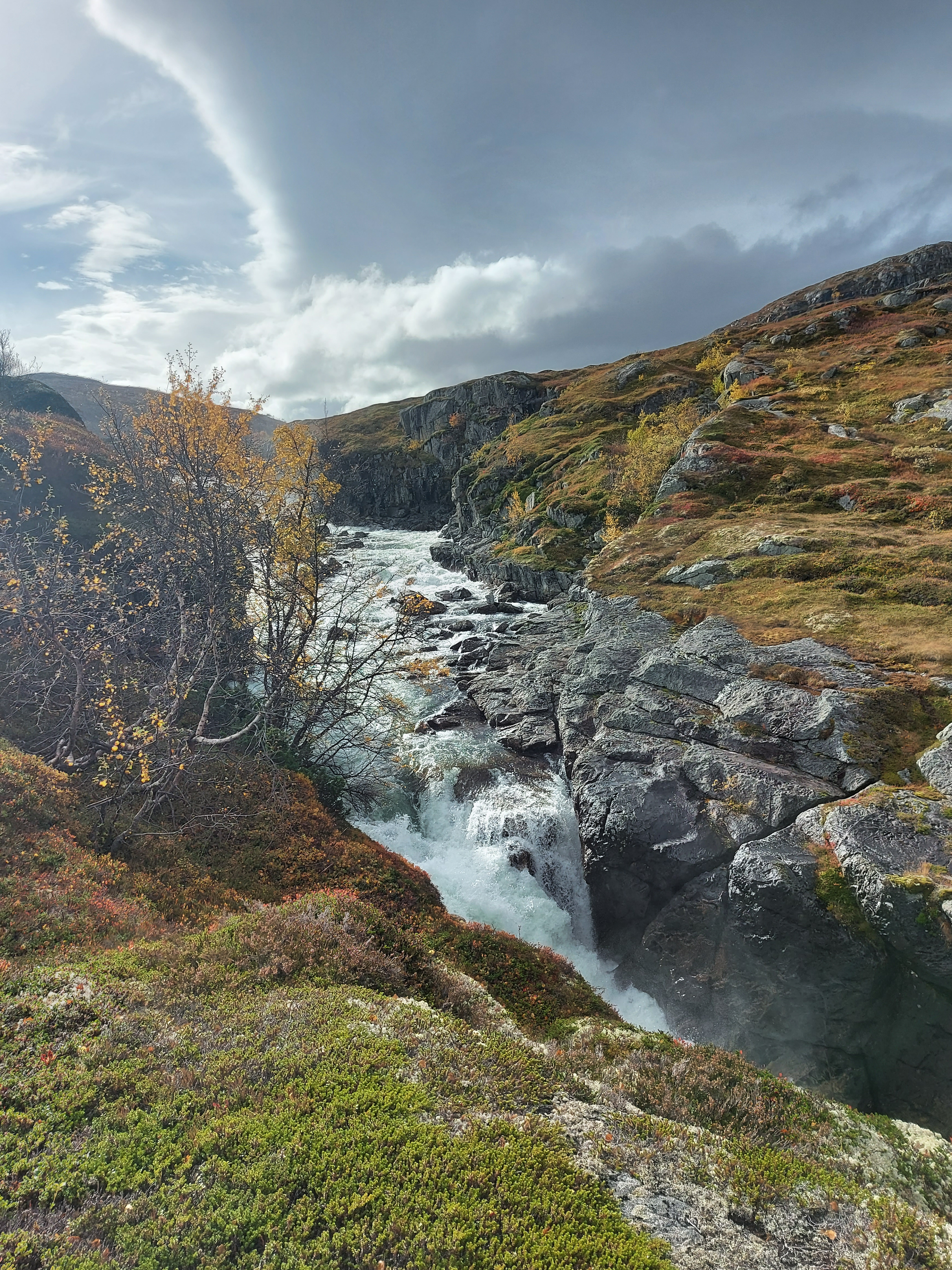

Location
- Country: Norway
- County: Vestland
- Municipalities: Eidfjord Municipality

Physical characteristics
- Source: Hardanger Plateau
  - location: Eidfjord / Ullensvang, Norway
  - coordinates: 60.188475°N 7.2109794°E
  - elevation: 1,287 m (4,222 ft)
- Mouth: Lake Eidfjord
  - location: Eidfjord Municipality, Norway
  - coordinates: 60.4260759°N 7.1147847°E
  - elevation: 17.5 m (57 ft)
- Length: 44.6 km (27.7 mi)
- Basin size: 497.86 km^{2} (192.22 sq mi)
- Discharge
  - average: 23.22 m^{3}/s (820 cu ft/s)

The Veig is a river in Eidfjord Municipality and Ullensvang Municipality in Vestland county, Norway. The river is 44.6 kilometers (27.7 mi) long and has a drainage basin of 497.86 square kilometers (192.22 sq mi). Its average discharge is 23.22 cubic meters per second (820 cu ft/s).

The river rises east of Hårteigen (1,690 meters or 5,540 feet), a mountain in the central part of the Hardanger Plateau. It runs to the north and empties into Lake Eidfjord. Along its course from the plateau to the Valur Valley (Valursdalen) is Valur Falls (Valursfossen), with a height of 272 meters (892 ft). It then flows through the Hjølmo Valley (Hjølmadalen) before reaching Lake Eidfjord. In 1981 the river system was protected against development for hydroelectric power in connection with the creation of Hardanger Plateau National Park.
