= Sandfloegga =

Mountain in Vestland, Norway

- Sandfloeggi (unofficial)
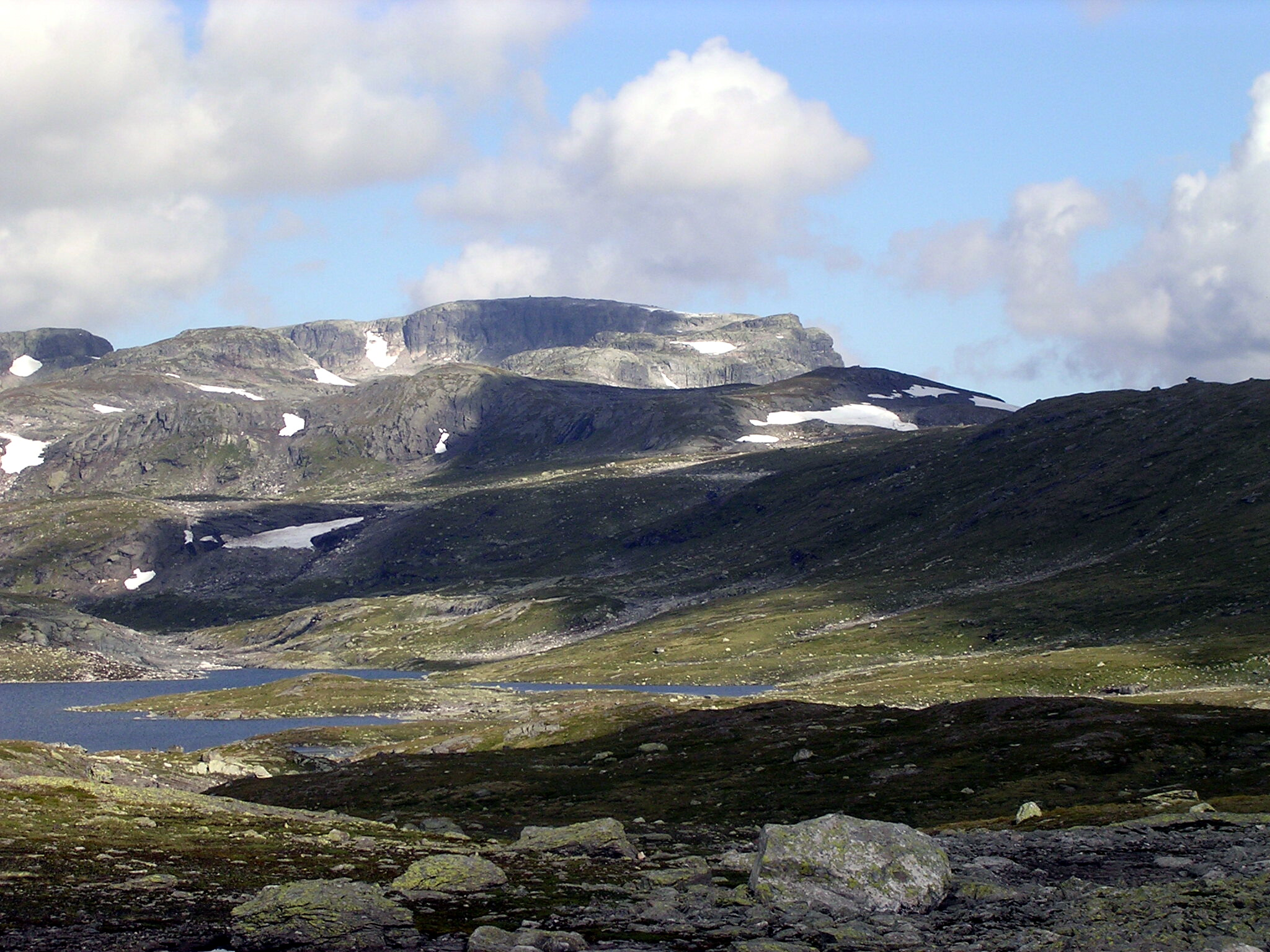
- Seen from Holmasjøen (southeast)

Highest point
- Elevation: 1,722 m (5,650 ft)
- Prominence: 543 m (1,781 ft)
- Isolation: 68.3 km (42.4 mi)
- Coordinates: 59°56′47″N 7°08′43″E

Geography
- Location: Vestland, Norway
- Topo map: 1414 IV Haukelisæter

Sandfloegga is a mountain in Ullensvang Municipality in southeastern Vestland county, Norway. It lies on the southern part of the vast Hardangervidda mountain plateau, and is the highest mountain on Hardangervidda when the bordering summits of Hardangerjøkulen and Folarskardnuten are omitted. The 1,722-metre (5,650 ft) tall mountain lies inside Hardangervidda National Park, about 10 kilometres (6.2 mi) north of the European route E134 highway.

From the summit, the Folgefonna glacier is seen in the northwest, the mountain Hårteigen in the north, the Hallingskarvet mountain ridge and the glacier Hardangerjøkulen in the northeast, and the mountain Gaustatoppen in the east.

== See also ==
- List of mountains of Norway
