= Valursfossen =

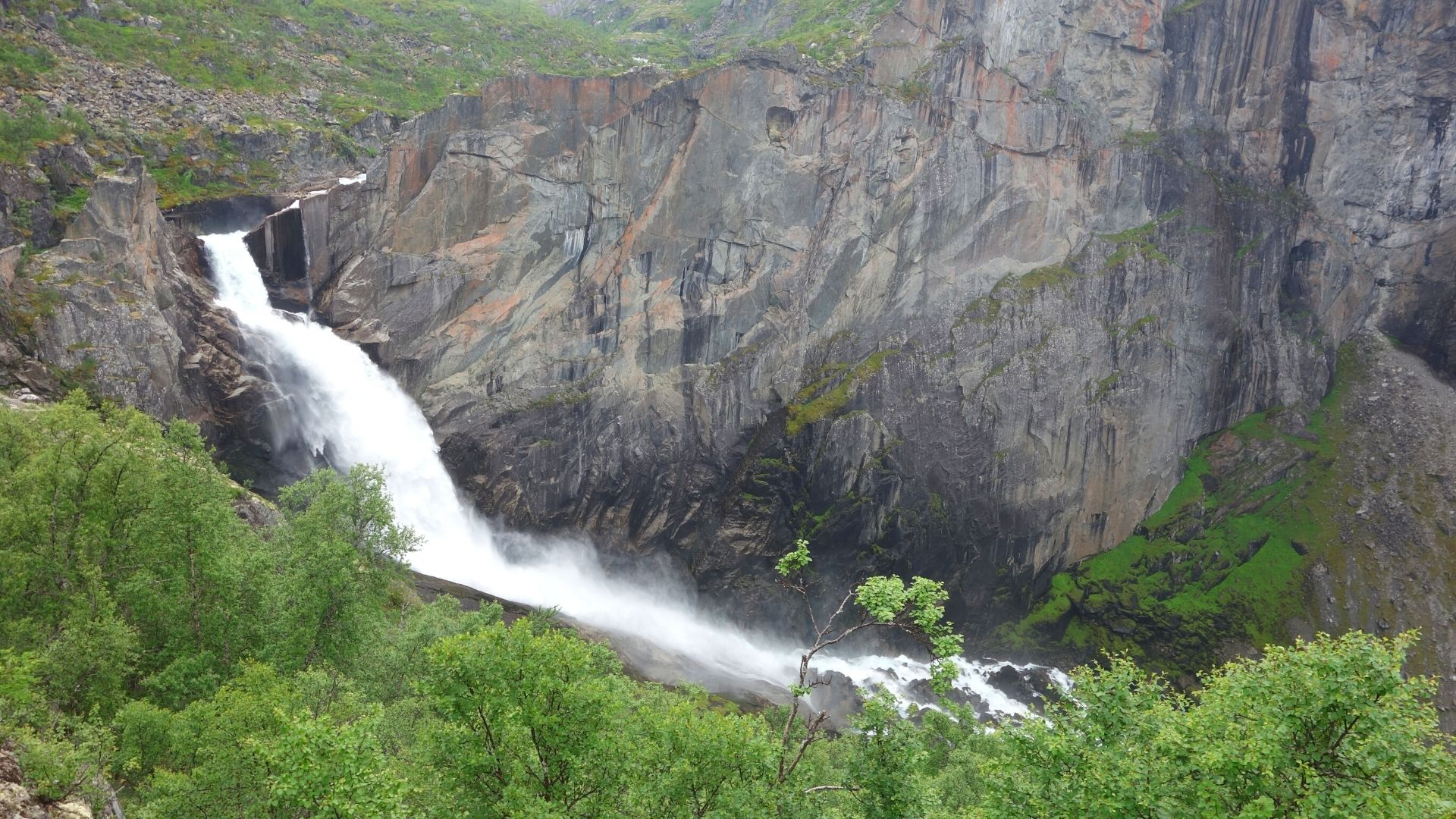
- Valursfossen, seen from viewpoint at end of marked hiking track.
- Interactive map of Valursfossen
- Location: Vestland, Norway
- Coordinates: 60.36004°N 7.14537°E
- Type: Horsetail, Cascades
- Total height: 272 metres (892 ft)
- Number of drops: 2
- Longest drop: 205 metres (673 ft)
- Watercourse: Veig

Valursfossen (lit. 'Valur Falls') is a waterfall in Eidfjord Municipality in Vestland county, Norway. It is part of the river Veig, where it runs down from the Hardangervidda mountain plateau and down into the Valursdalen valley. It has a total descent of 272 m.

== See also ==
- List of waterfalls
