= Hardangervidda National Park =

Largest national park in Norway

- IUCN category II (national park)

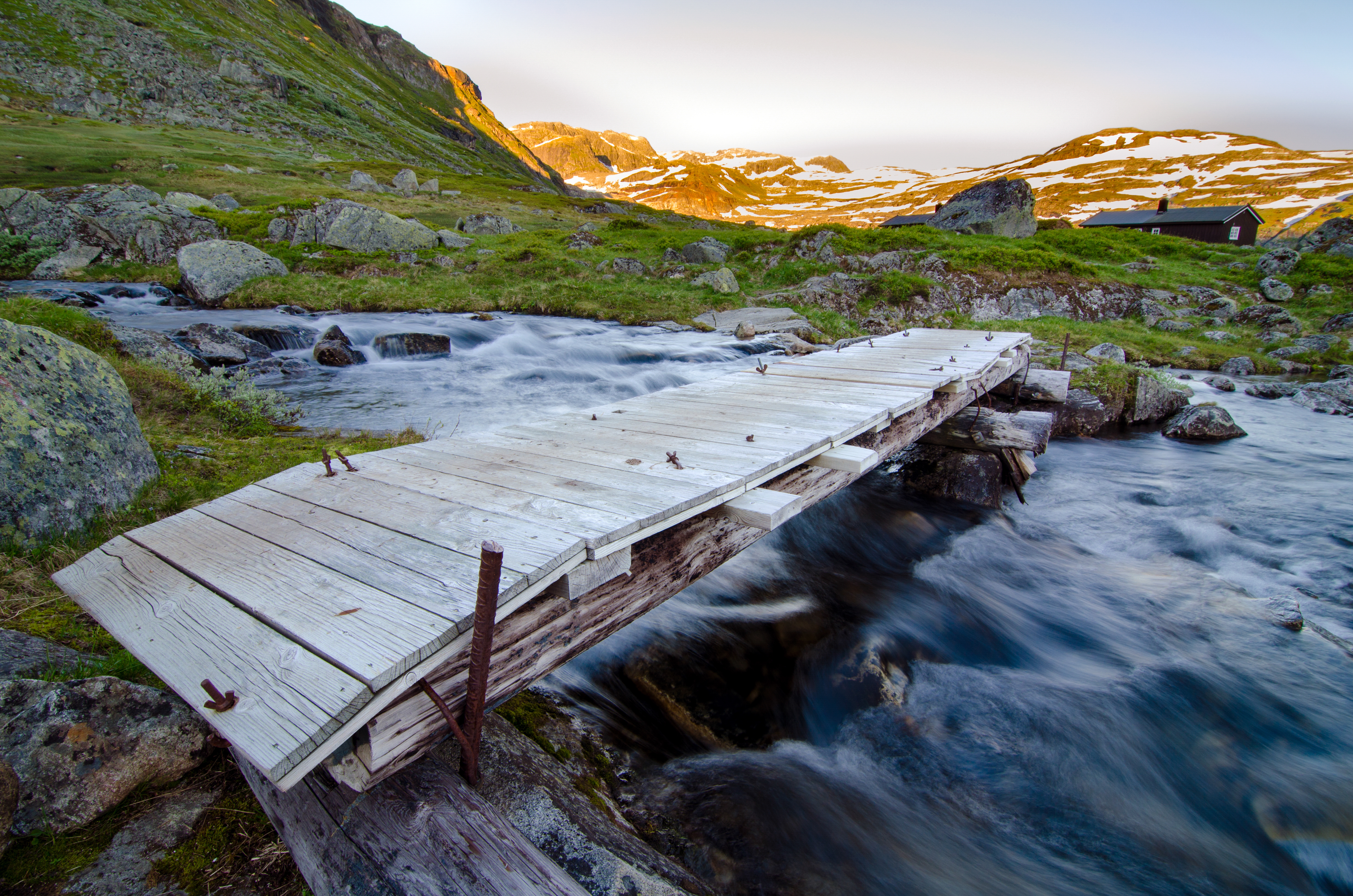
- Sunset by a river near Rembesdalsvatnet
- Interactive map of Hardangervidda National Park
- Location: Hardangervidda; Counties: Buskerud, Vestland, and Telemark; Country: Norway
- Nearest city: Bergen
- Coordinates: 60°3′N 7°25′E
- Area: 3,422 km^{2} (1,321 sq mi)
- Established: 1981
- Governing body: Directorate for Nature Management

Hardangervidda National Park (English: Hardanger Plateau National Park, Norwegian: Hardangervidda nasjonalpark) is Norway's largest national park, measuring 3,422 square kilometres (1,321 sq mi). It is located in Buskerud, Vestland, and Telemark counties. The park spans from the Uvdalen valley in Numedal in the east and the Røvilseggi mountain ridge in Ullensvang Municipality in the west across the Hardanger mountain plateau (Hardangervidda). Designated as a national park in 1981, today it serves as a popular tourist destination for activities such as hiking, climbing, fishing, and cross-country skiing. The Norwegian Mountain Touring Association (DNT) maintains a comprehensive network of huts and paths across Hardangervidda. The Bergen Line railway and the main Norwegian National Road 7 cross the plateau.

It has the southernmost stock of several arctic animals and plants. Its wild reindeer herds are among the largest in the world. Several hundred nomadic Stone Age settlements have been found in the area, most likely related to the migration of the reindeer. Ancient trails cross the plateau, linking western and eastern Norway; one example is the Nordmannsslepa linking Eidfjord in Hardanger and Veggli in the Numedal valley with Hol and Uvdal.

The name Hardangervidda is put together by the name of the district Hardanger and the finite form of vidde which means 'wide plain, large mountain plateau'.

The park includes lands in Eidfjord Municipality and Ullensvang Municipality in Vestland county, Vinje Municipality and Tinn Municipality in Telemark county, and Nore og Uvdal Municipality and Hol Municipality in Buskerud county.

== Geography and geology ==
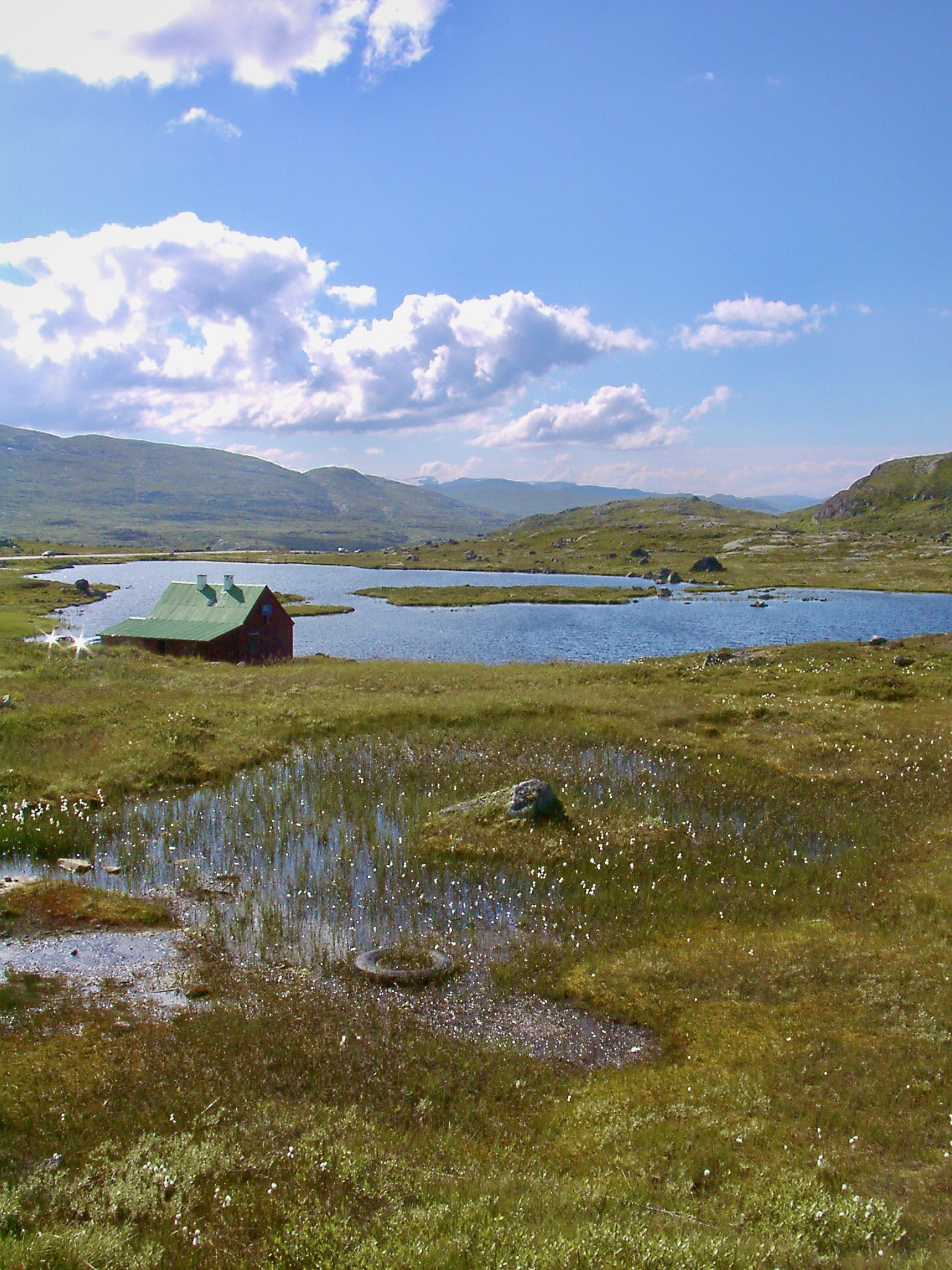
Hardangervidda

The plateau is the largest peneplain (eroded plain) in Europe, covering an area of about 6,500 km^{2} (2,500 sq mi) at an average elevation of 1,100 metres (3,600 ft). The highest point on the plateau is at the top of the Hardangerjøkulen glacier, which reaches a height of 1,863 m (6,112 ft).

The landscape of the Hardangervidda is characterised by barren, treeless moorland interrupted by numerous pools, lakes, rivers and streams. There are significant differences between the west side, which is dominated by rocky terrain and expanses of bare rock, and the east side, which is much flatter and more heavily vegetated. The climate also varies between the two sides: it is considerably wetter on the west side than on the east, with over 1,000 millimetres (39 in) per year recorded in some parts. The prominent peak of Hårteigen 1,690 m (5,545 ft) is visible across much of the plateau.

Much of the Hardangervidda's geology is extremely ancient. The rolling fells of the Hardangervidda are the remnants of mountains that were worn down by the action of glaciers during the ice ages. The bedrock is mainly of Precambrian and Cambro-Silurian origin.

== Flora and fauna ==
The whole of the Hardangervidda is above the tree line. Its alpine climate enables the presence of many species of arctic animals and plants further south than anywhere else in Europe. Its wild reindeer herds are among the largest in the world, with some 15,000 animals recorded in 1996 and around 8,000 in 2008. They migrate across the plateau during the year, moving from their winter grazing lands on the east side of the Hardangervidda, where they graze on lichen, to their breeding grounds in the more fertile west of the plateau.

The varying climate of the plateau has a marked effect on the flora, which is richer on the wetter west side than in the drier east; much of the plateau is covered by coarse grasses, mosses (especially sphagnum) and lichens.

In the Holocene climatic optimum (Stone Age) 9000 – 5000 years ago, the regional climate was warmer, and large parts of Hardangervidda were wooded; pine logs can still be found preserved in bogs well above today's treeline. With the predicted warming, Hardangervidda could again be largely wooded ().

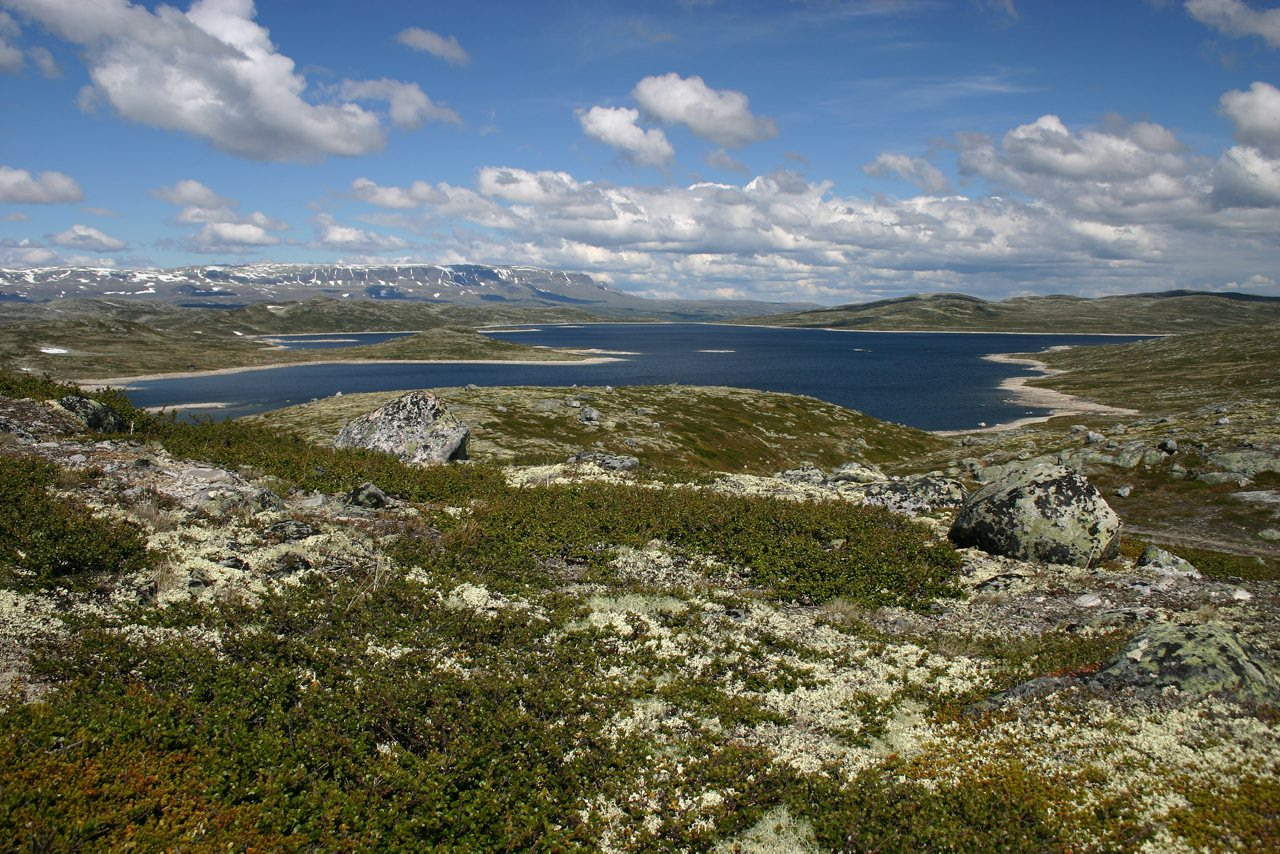
Hardangervidda landscape

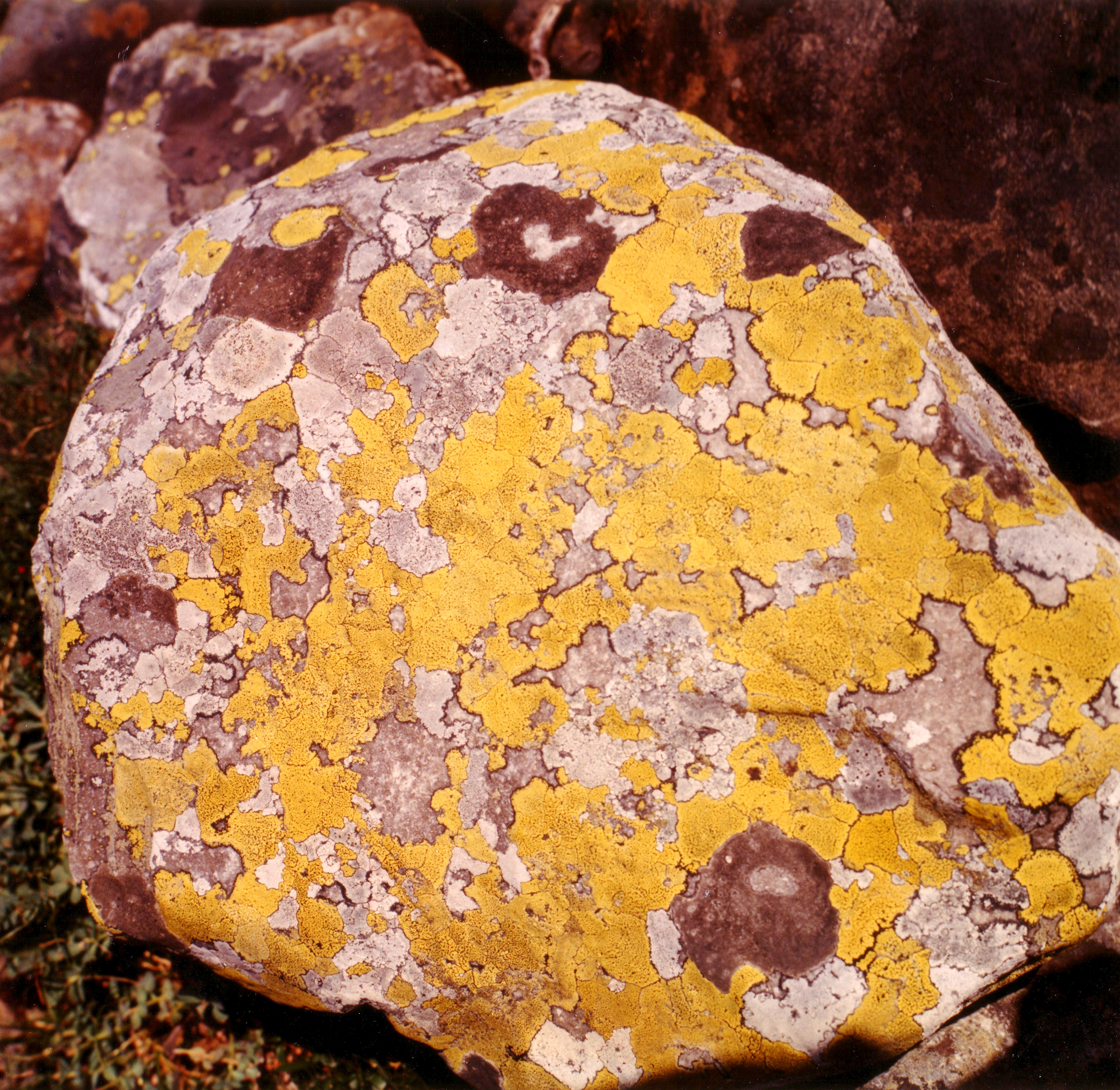
Map lichen on a rock of the Hardangervidda

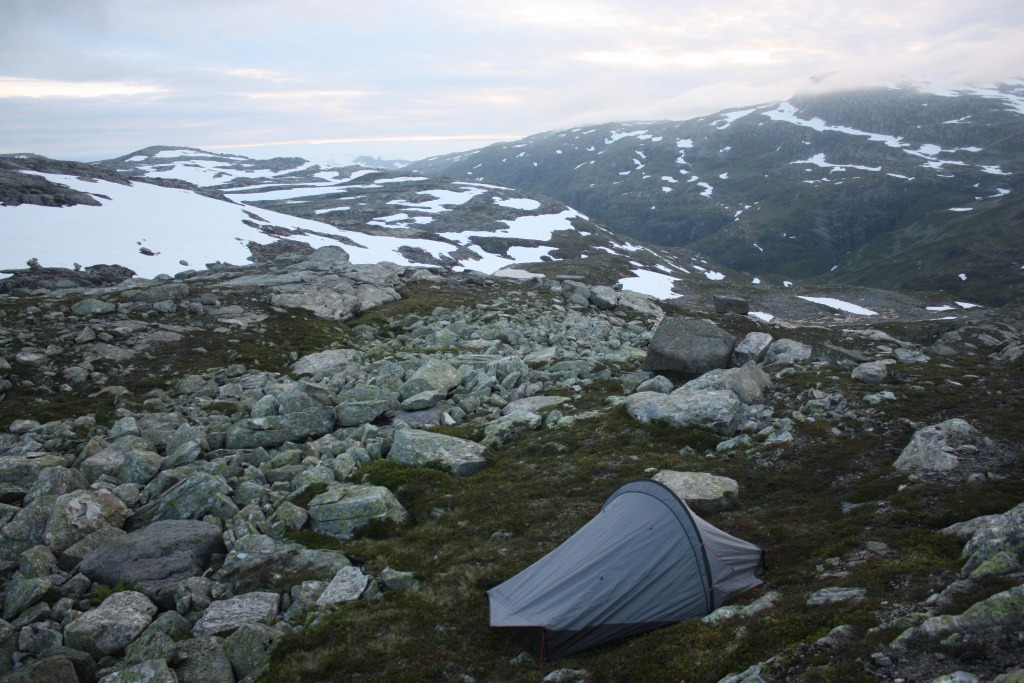
Hiking tent in southwestern Hardangervidda

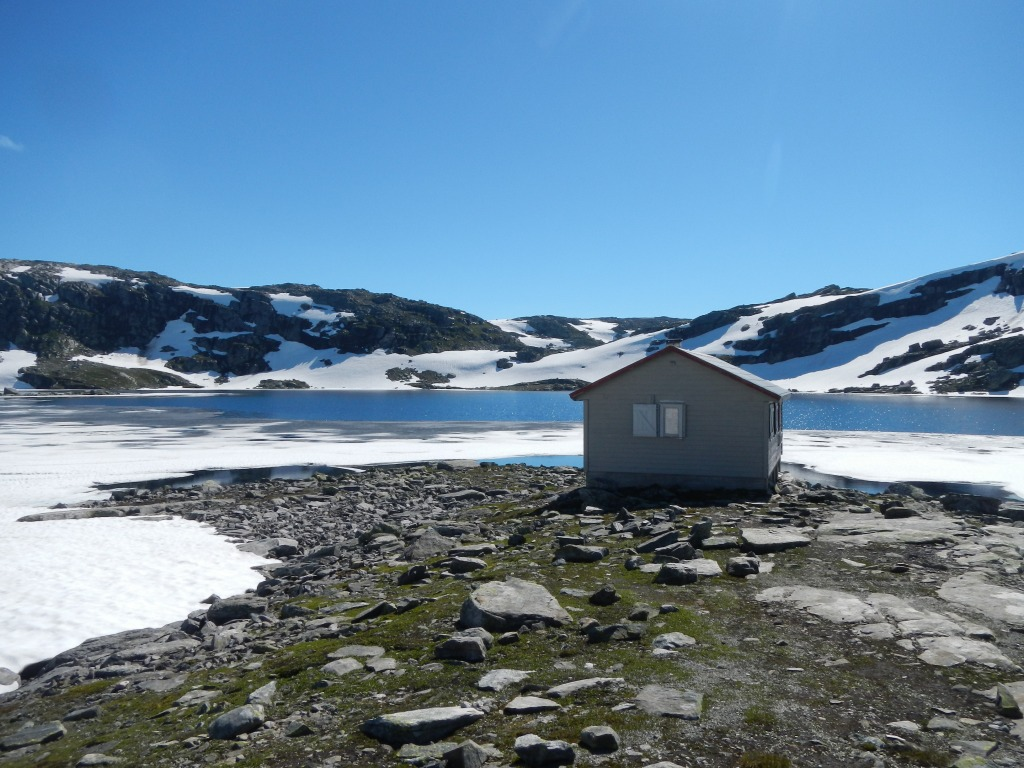
Kvanntjørnsbu

== Visitor centres ==
The national park has two visitor centres: the Hardangervidda Natursenter (Nature Centre) in the village of Øvre Eidfjord in Eidfjord Municipality, and the Hardangervidda Nasjonalparksenter (National Park Centre) at Skinnarbu in Tinn Municipality which is located near the lake Møsvatnet, the town of Rjukan, and the mountain village of Raulandsgrend.

== Human settlement ==
The Hardangervidda has been occupied for thousands of years; several hundred nomadic Stone Age settlements have been found in the area, most likely related to the migration of the reindeer. Ancient trails cross the plateau, linking western and eastern Norway. One example is the "Nordmannsslepa" linking Eidfjord and Veggli in the Numedal valley with Hol and Uvdal. It is still a key transit route between Oslo and Bergen. The Bergen Line railway and the main Norwegian National Road 7 cross the plateau.

== Activities ==
Hardangervidda is accessible all year round. June/July to September/October is great for hiking, fishing, wildlife viewing, cycling, horseback riding, canoeing, hunting and other summer activities. Hiking is the easiest and best way to experience Hardangervidda national park. The Norwegian Trekking Association offers a network of hiking paths and cabins connecting Hardangervidda from Haukeliseter and Mogen in the south to Finse in the north, Rjukan and Geilo in the east and Eidfjord and Odda in the west.

== Accidents ==
At night on 26 August 2016, 323 wild reindeers, including 70 calves, were killed by lightning during a storm, when they stood in the grasses of the Hardangervidda plateau.

== In filming ==
Part of the second episode of The Future is Wild was filmed here.
