= Hardangervidda =

Mountain plateau in Norway

Hardangervidda Hardanger Plateau
- Plateau
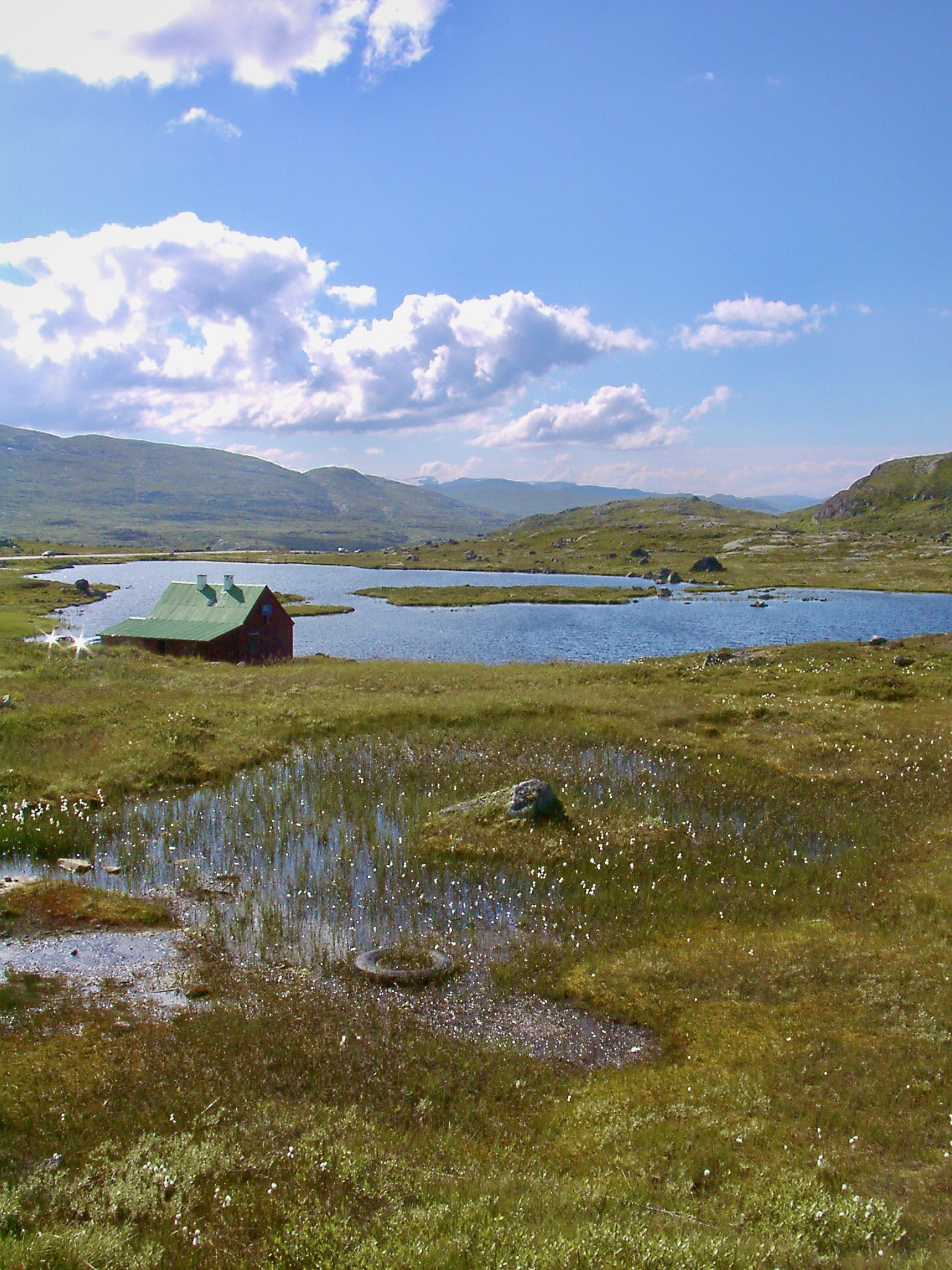
- 2001 view of the Hardangervidda landscape
- Interactive map of Hardangervidda
- Coordinates: 60°03′N 007°25′E
- Location: Vestland, Telemark, and Buskerud, Norway

Area
  - Total: 6,500 km^{2} (2,500 sq mi)
- Elevation: 1,100 m (3,600 ft)
- Highest elevation: 1,721 m (5,646 ft) (Sandfloegga)

Hardangervidda (English: Hardanger Plateau) is a mountain plateau (Norwegian: vidde) in central southern Norway, covering parts of Vestland, Telemark, and Buskerud counties. It is the largest plateau of its kind in Europe, with a cold year-round alpine climate, and one of Norway's largest glaciers, Hardangerjøkulen, is situated here. Much of the plateau is protected as part of Hardangervidda National Park. Hardangervidda is a popular tourist and leisure destination, and it is ideal for many outdoor activities.

== Geography and geology ==
The plateau is the largest peneplain (eroded plain) in Europe, covering an area of about 6,500 km^{2} (2,500 sq mi) at an average elevation of 1,100 metres (3,600 ft). The highest point on the plateau is the Sandfloegga, which reaches a height of 1,721 m (5,646 ft).

The landscape of the Hardangervidda is characterised by barren, treeless moorland interrupted by numerous pools, lakes, rivers and streams. There are significant differences between the west side, which is dominated by rocky terrain and expanses of bare rock, and the east side, which is much flatter and more heavily vegetated. The climate also varies between the two sides: it is considerably wetter on the west side than on the east, with over 1,000 millimetres (39 in) per year recorded in some parts. The prominent peak of Hårteigen 1,690 m (5,545 ft) is visible across much of the plateau.

Much of the Hardangervidda's geology is extremely ancient. The rolling fells of the Hardangervidda are the remnants of mountains that were worn down by the action of glaciers during the ice ages. The bedrock is mainly of Precambrian and Cambro-Silurian origin.

The area of the Hardangervidda was once part of the Sub-Cambrian peneplain before it was thrust over by the nappes of the Caledonian orogeny in Paleozoic times. Much later, in the Miocene epoch, the modern flatness of the Hardangervidda took form as a peneplain formed at sea level. Then in Early Pliocene times the Hardangervidda and the whole of southern Scandinavian Mountains were uplifted more than a thousand meters.

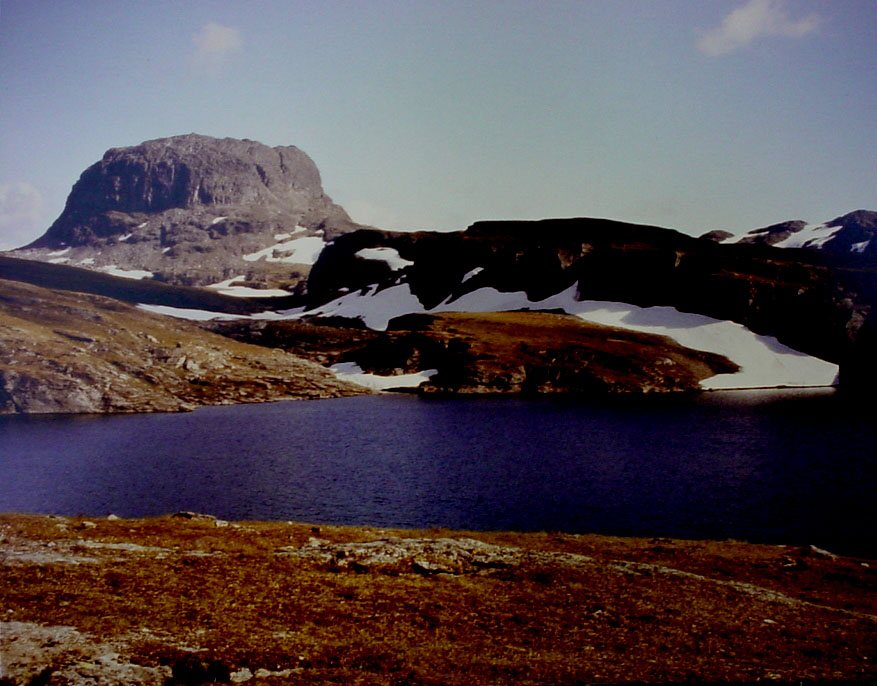
Hårteigen, a characteristic mountain on Hardangervidda

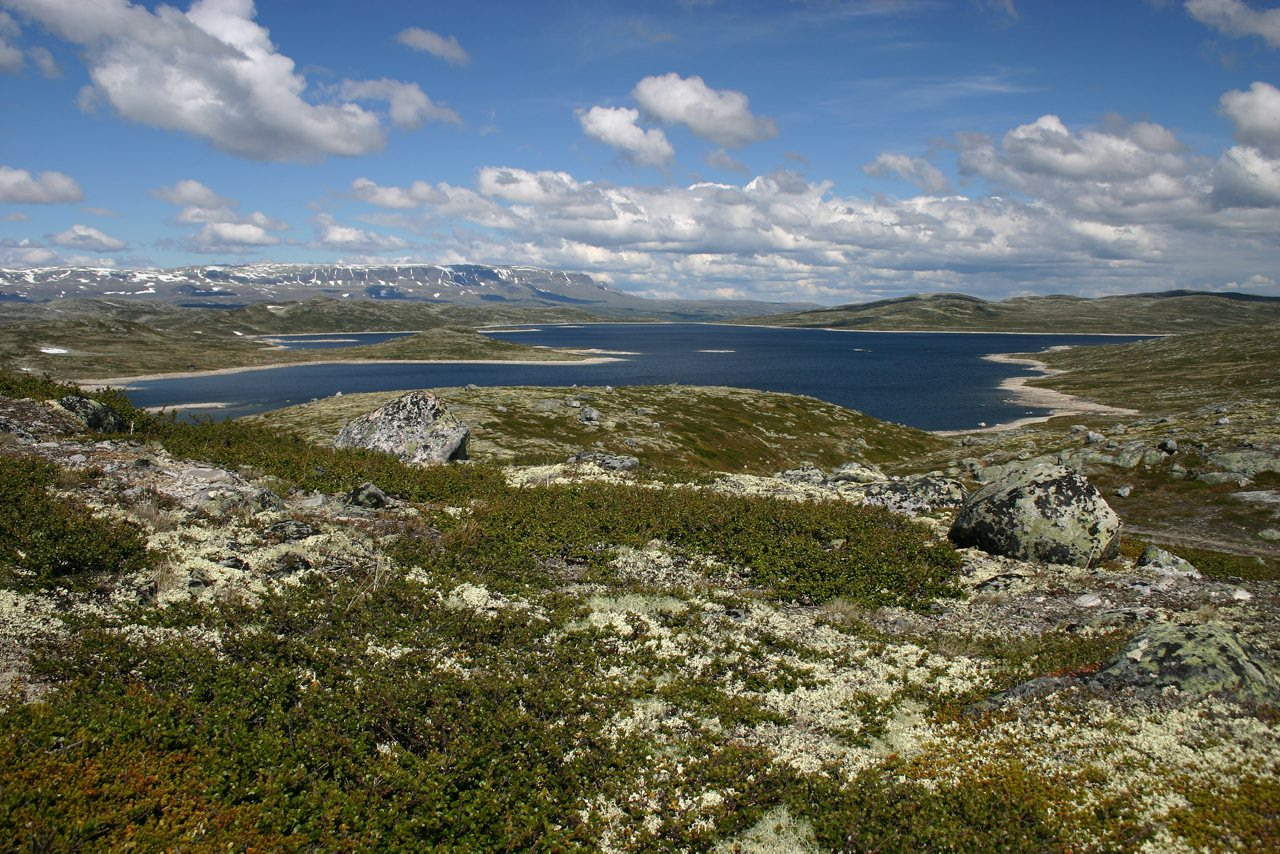
Hardangervidda landscape

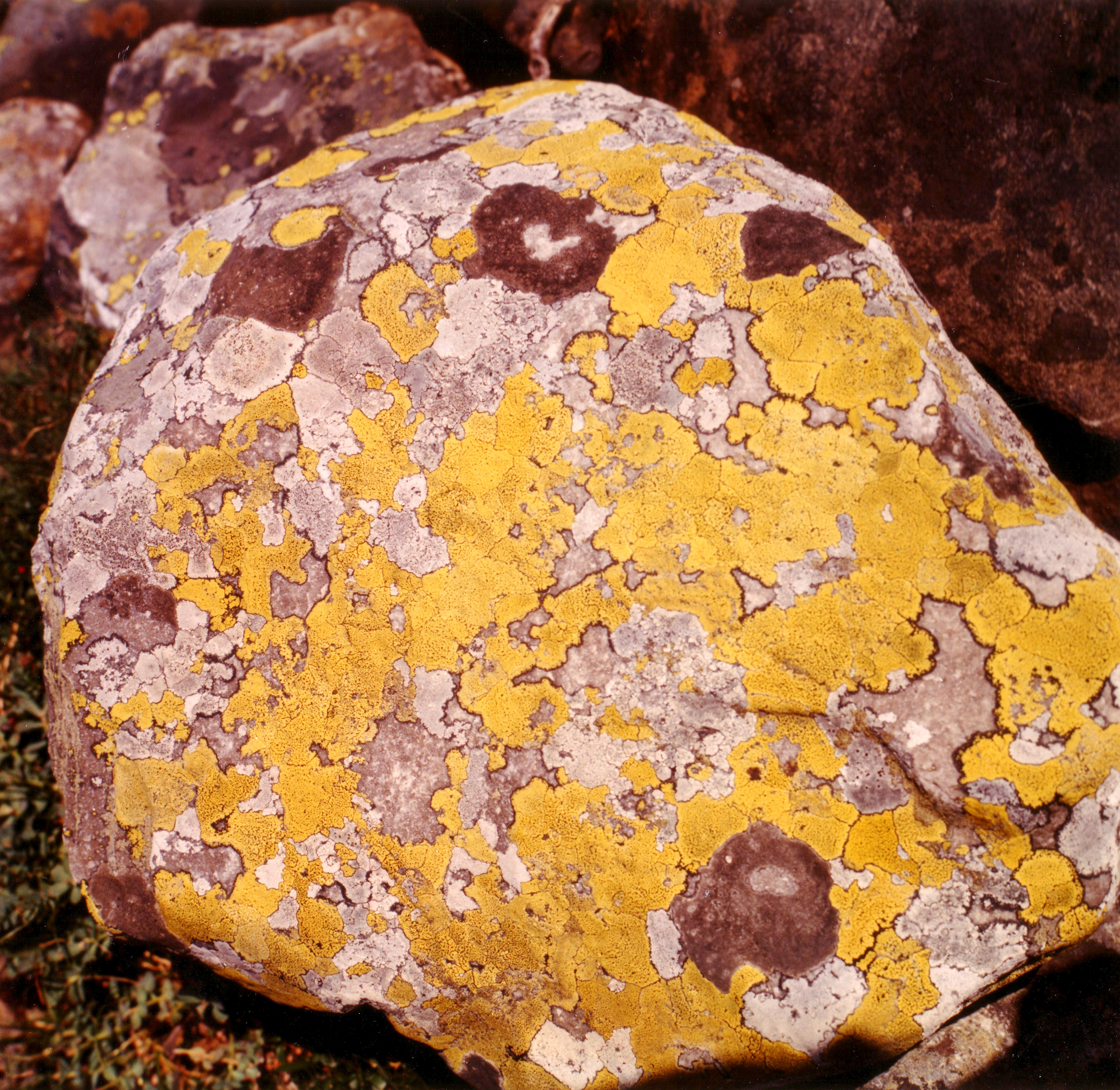
Map lichen on a rock of the Hardangervidda

== Flora and fauna ==
The whole of the Hardangervidda is above the tree line. Its alpine climate enables the presence of many species of arctic animals and plants further south than anywhere else in Europe. Its wild reindeer herds are among the largest in the world, with some 15,000 animals recorded in 1996 and about 8,000 in 2008. They migrate across the plateau during the year, moving from their winter grazing lands on the east side of the Hardangervidda, where they graze on lichen, to their breeding grounds in the more fertile west of the plateau. On 26 August 2016, 323 were killed by lightning, prompting a Norwegian Environment Agency discussion on whether to leave so many corpses in the open.

The varying climate of the plateau has a marked effect on the flora, which is richer on the wetter west side than in the drier east; much of the plateau is covered by coarse grasses, mosses (especially sphagnum) and lichens.

Ciclosporin, an immunosuppressant drug widely used in organ transplantation to prevent rejection was initially isolated from the fungus Tolypocladium inflatum (Beauveria nivea), found in a soil sample obtained in 1969 from Hardangervidda.

In the Holocene climatic optimum (Stone Age) 9,000–5,000 years ago, the regional climate was warmer, and large parts of Hardangervidda were wooded; pine logs can still be found preserved in bogs well above today's treeline. With the predicted warming, Hardangervidda could again be largely wooded.

== Visitor centres ==
The national park has two visitor centres on the plateau:

- the Hardangervidda Natursenter (Nature Centre) in Eidfjord Municipality in Vestland county
- the Hardangervidda Nasjonalparksenter (National Park Centre) at Skinnarbu in Tinn Municipality (near the lake Møsvatn, the town Rjukan, and the mountain village Raulandsgrend)

== Human settlement ==
The Hardangervidda has been occupied for thousands of years; several hundred nomadic Stone Age settlements have been found in the area, most likely related to the migration of the reindeer. Ancient trails cross the plateau, linking western and eastern Norway. One example is the "Nordmannsslepa" linking Eidfjord and Veggli in the Numedal valley with Hol and Uvdal. It is still a key transit route between Oslo and Bergen. The Bergen Line and the main Norwegian National Road 7 cross the plateau.

== National park ==
In 1981, much of the Hardangervidda was designated a national park, Norway's largest at 3,422 km^{2} (1,321 sq mi). The park's boundaries stretch from Numedal and Uvdal in the east and Røvelseggi and Ullensvang in the west. The Norwegian Mountain Touring Association (DNT) maintains a comprehensive network of huts and paths across the plateau. It is a popular destination for hiking, climbing and fishing, and in winter for cross-country skiing from hut to hut.

== In culture ==
Norwegian music projects Ildjarn and Nidhogg combined their talents to produce two ambient albums, one titled "Hardangervidda Part I" (2003) and the other "Hardangervidda Part II" (2003), inspired entirely by this zone.

The final two acts of the play When We Dead Awaken (Danish: Når vi døde vågner) by Henrik Ibsen, are set in a mountain health resort in Hardangervidda.

Location shooting for the Hoth sequences in The Empire Strikes Back took place on the Hardangerjøkulen glacier.

The title theme of the Norwegian film O'Horten, by Norwegian composer Kaada, is titled "Across the Hardanger Mountain Plateau" and features a train crossing the area.
