= Hårteigen =

Mountain in Vestland, Norway

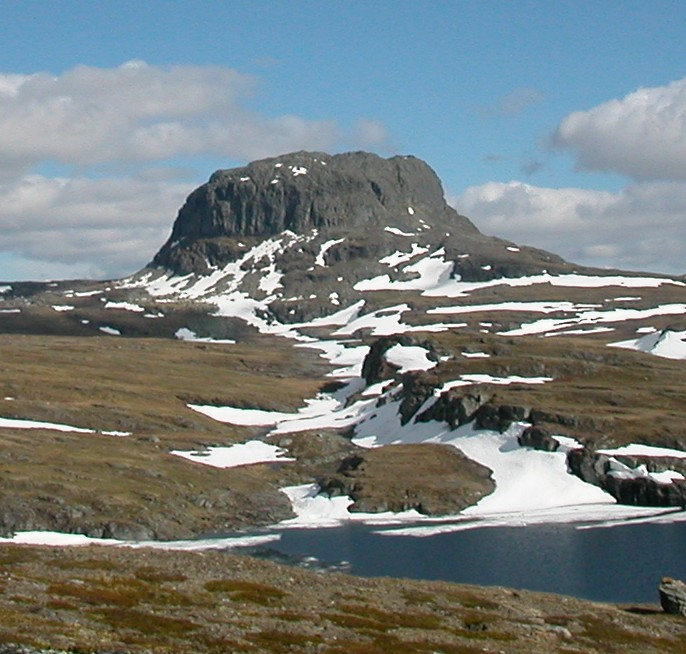

Highest point
- Elevation: 1,690 m (5,540 ft)
- Prominence: 471 m (1,545 ft)
- Isolation: 27.8 km (17.3 mi)
- Coordinates: 60°11′39″N 7°04′08″E

Geography
- Location: Vestland, Norway
- Topo map: 1415 III Hårteigen

Climbing
- First ascent: 18 August 1812. Christen Smith, J. Fr. Schouw, and Nils Hertzberg
- Easiest route: Steep ice/snow

Hårteigen is a characteristic mountain in Vestland county, Norway. It sits on and is visible from most parts of the vast Hardangervidda plateau. The mountain is located in Ullensvang Municipality, and it is inside the Hardangervidda National Park.

At an elevation of 1,690 metres (5,540 ft) above sea level, the peak of Hårteigen rises 471 metres (1,545 ft) above the surrounding plateau which is fairly flat. It is located about 30 kilometres (19 mi) northeast of the town of Odda.

== Name ==
The first element is from the Old Norse word hárr which means 'grey' and the last element is related to the German verb zeigen which means 'to show'. The name was likely chosen because when on the large and flat Hardangervidda plateau, this mountain was important for travelers to find the direction.

== See also ==
- List of mountains of Norway
