= Hardangerjøkulen =

Glacier in Norway

- Jukulen (historic); Hallingjøkulen (unofficial); Hardanger Glacier (English)
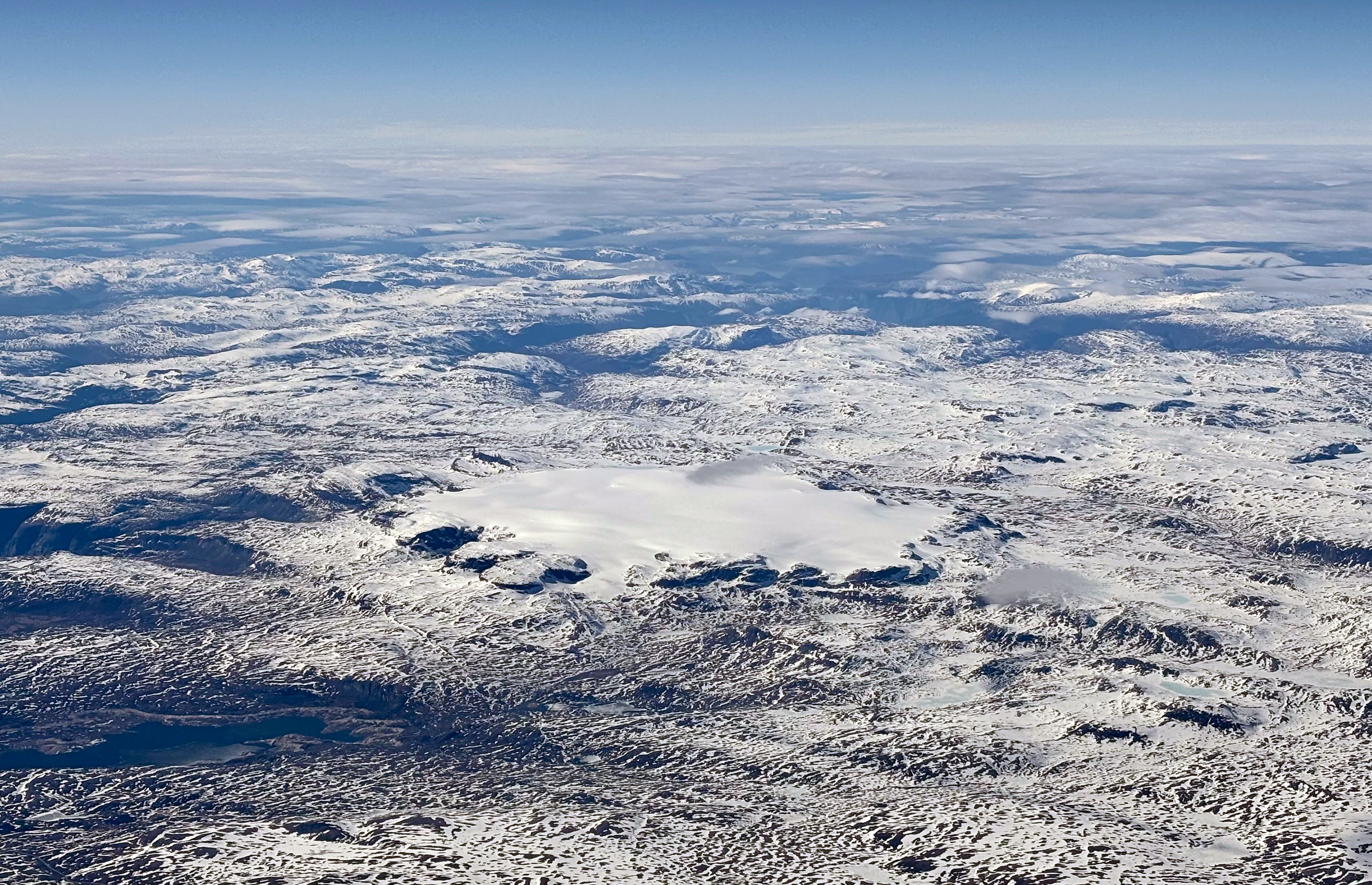
- Aerial view of Hardangerjøkulen
- Interactive map of Hardangerjøkulen
- Location: Vestland, Norway
- Coordinates: 60°32′N 07°25′E
- Area: 73 km^{2} (28 sq mi)
- Thickness: 380 metres (1,250 ft)
- Highest elevation: 1,863 metres (6,112 ft)
- Lowest elevation: 1,050 metres (3,440 ft)

Hardangerjøkulen (lit. 'Hardanger Glacier') is the sixth largest glacier in mainland Norway. It is located in Eidfjord Municipality and Ulvik Municipality in Vestland county. It is located about 16 kilometres (9.9 mi) northeast of the village of Eidfjord, about 5 kilometres (3.1 mi) south of the village of Finse, and about 20 kilometres (12 mi) west of the village of Haugastøl.

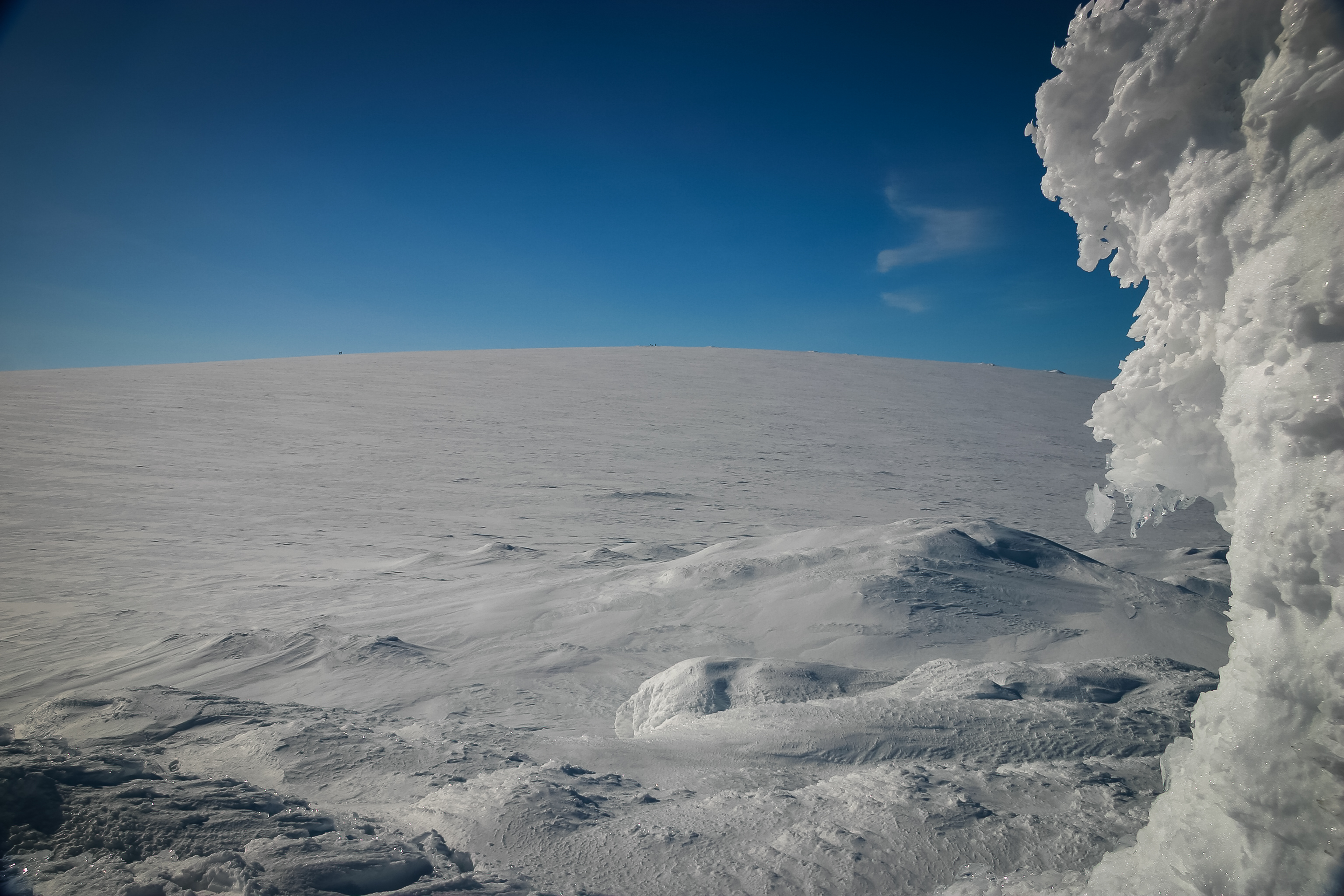
Hardangerjøkulen's highest point is at 1,863 metres (6,112 ft) above sea level.

Hardangerjøkulen's highest point is 1,863 m (6,112 ft) above sea level, and is the highest point in Hordaland county. Its lowest point is 1,050 m (3,440 ft) above sea level. The largest measured ice thickness on Hardangerjøkulen was 380 metres (1,250 ft), but it has been getting thinner during the 20th century.

== Accessibility ==
The glacier can be accessed by skis from the north in the winter, from the village of Finse, which is only accessible by stopping at Finse Station on the Bergen Line railway.

== Recent history ==
The 1980 movie Star Wars: Episode V – The Empire Strikes Back used Hardangerjøkulen as a filming location, for scenes of the ice planet Hoth, although in the battle scene, miniatures were used on a set that used microscopic glass bubbles and baking soda to mimic the snowy territory.

== See also ==
- List of glaciers in Norway
- List of highest points of Norwegian counties
