= Haus Municipality =

Former municipality in Hordaland, Norway

Haus Municipality Haus herad
- Former municipality
- Hougs herred (historic name)
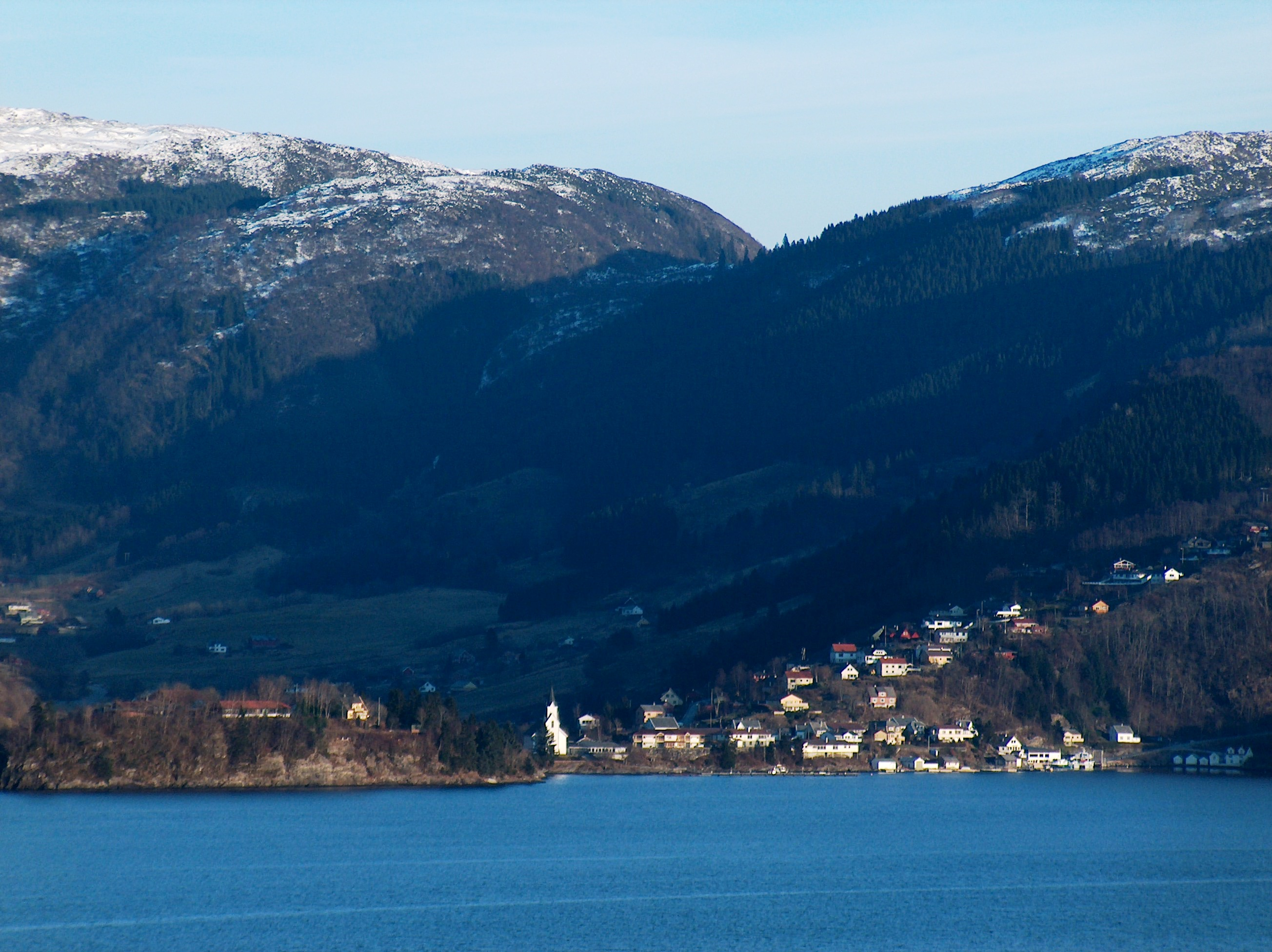
- View of Hausvik

- Hordaland within Norway

- Haus within Hordaland
- Coordinates: 60°27′11″N 05°29′45″E
- Country: Norway
- County: Hordaland
- District: Nordhordland
- Established: 1 Jan 1838
  - Created as: Formannskapsdistrikt
- Disestablished: 1 Jan 1964
  - Succeeded by: Osterøy Municipality and Arna Municipality
- Administrative centre: Haus

Government
  - Mayor (1956–1964): Johannes Holmefjord

Area (upon dissolution)
  - Total: 198.50 km^{2} (76.64 sq mi)
  - Rank: #372 in Norway
- Highest elevation: 987 m (3,238 ft)

Population (1963)
  - Total: 10,843
  - Rank: #60 in Norway
  - Density: 54.6/km^{2} (141/sq mi)
  - Change (10 years): ▲ +16.4%
- Demonym: Hausing

Official language
  - Norwegian form: Nynorsk
- Time zone: UTC+01:00 (CET)
  - Summer (DST): UTC+02:00 (CEST)
- ISO 3166 code: NO-1250

Haus (historically Hougs) is a former municipality in the old Hordaland county, Norway. The 198.5-square-kilometre (76.6 sq mi) municipality existed from 1838 until its dissolution in 1964. The area is now divided between Osterøy Municipality and Bergen Municipality in the traditional district of Nordhordland in Vestland county. The administrative centre was the village of Haus where Haus Church is located. Other villages in the municipality included Indre Arna, Ytre Arna, Trengereid, and Espeland.

Prior to its dissolution in 1964, the 198.5-square-kilometre (76.6 sq mi) municipality was the 372nd largest by area out of the 689 municipalities in Norway. Haus Municipality was the 60th most populous municipality in Norway with a population of about 10,843. The municipality's population density was 54.6 inhabitants per square kilometre (141/sq mi) and its population had increased by 16.4% over the previous 10-year period.

== General information ==
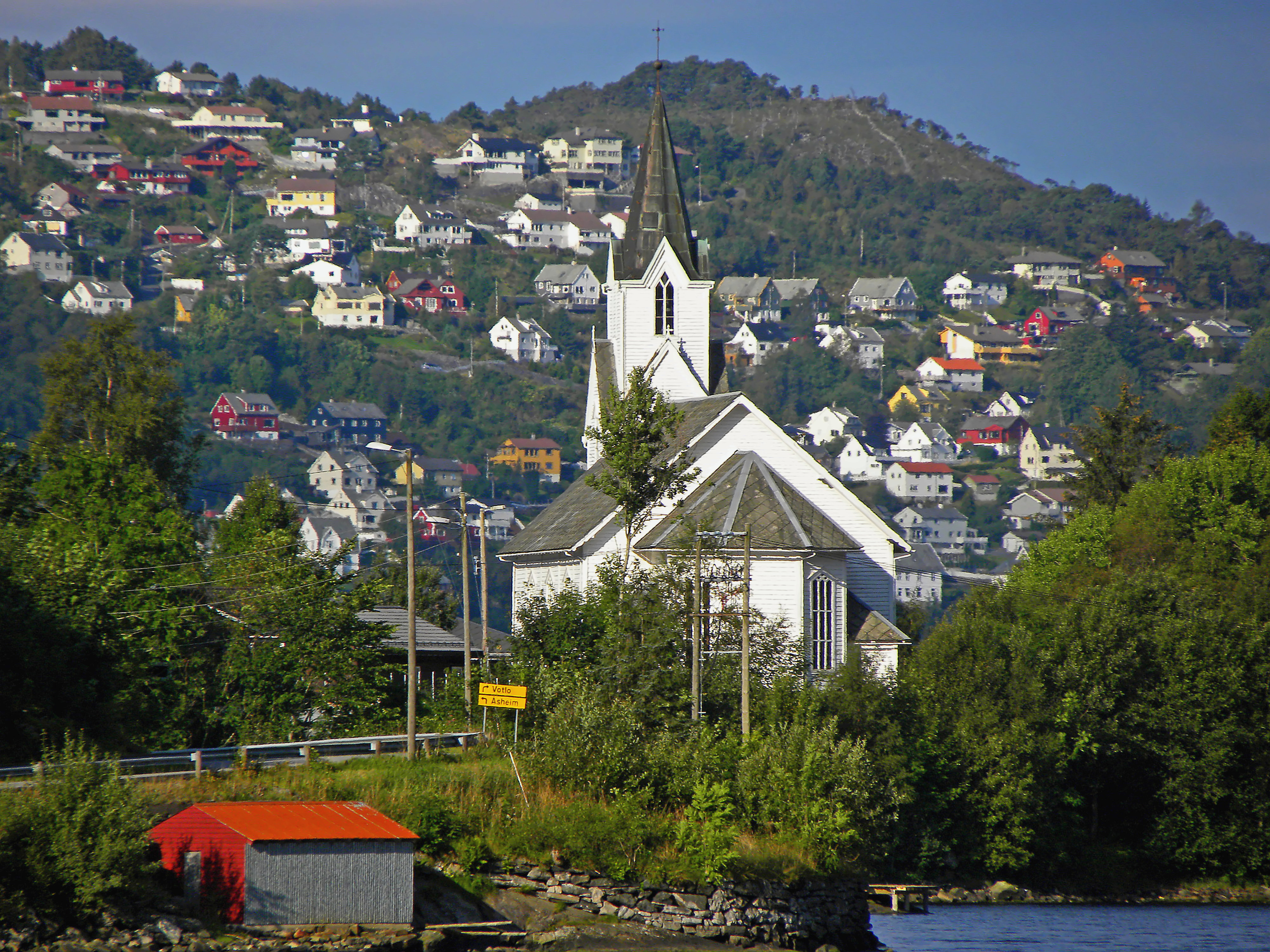
View of Haus Church

The parish of Haus (historically spelled "Hougs") was established as a municipality on 1 January 1838 (see formannskapsdistrikt law). On 1 January 1870, the municipality was divided: the northeastern half (population: 2,062) became the new Bruvik Municipality and the rest of the municipality (population: 4,229) remained as a smaller Haus Municipality.

During the 1960s, there were many municipal mergers across Norway due to the work of the Schei Committee. On 1 January 1964, Haus Municipality was dissolved and its lands were divided. The part of Haus Municipality that was situated on the island of Osterøy was transferred to the new Osterøy Municipality and the remaining part of Haus (on the mainland) formed the new Arna Municipality.

=== Name ===
The municipality (originally the parish) is named after the old Haus farm (Old Norse: Hauss) since the first Haus Church was built there. The name is identical with the word hauss which means "skull". It is likely referring to the shape of a nearby mountain. Historically, the name was spelled Hougs.

=== Churches ===
The Church of Norway had three parishes (sokn) within Haus Municipality. At the time of the municipal dissolution, it was part of the Haus prestegjeld and the Osterøy prosti (deanery) in the Diocese of Bjørgvin.

Churches in Haus Municipality
Parish (sokn)	Church name	Location of the church	Year built
Haus	Haus Church	Hausvik	1874
Arna	Arna Church	Indre Arna	1865
Arna	Arna Chapel	Ytre Arna	1899
Gjerstad	Gjerstad Church	Gjerstad	1870

== Geography ==
The municipality encompassed the southern part of the island of Osterøy as well as the mainland area across the Sørfjorden from the island to the east, south, and west (although the municipality was quite a bit larger when it was first created in 1838). The highest point in the municipality was the 987-metre (3,238 ft) tall mountain Gullfjelltoppen, located on the border with Samnanger Municipality.

Hosanger Municipality was located to the north, Bruvik Municipality was located to the east, Samnanger Municipality was located to the southeast, Fana Municipality was located to the south, the city of Bergen was located to the southwest, Åsane Municipality was located to the west, and Hamre Municipality was located to the northwest.

== Government ==
While it existed, Haus Municipality was responsible for primary education (through 10th grade), outpatient health services, senior citizen services, welfare and other social services, zoning, economic development, and municipal roads and utilities. The municipality was governed by a municipal council of directly elected representatives. The mayor was indirectly elected by a vote of the municipal council. The municipality was under the jurisdiction of the Gulating Court of Appeal.

=== Municipal council ===
The municipal council (Heradsstyre) of Haus Municipality was made up of 37 representatives that were elected to four year terms. The tables below show the historical composition of the council by political party.

Haus heradsstyre 1959–1963
Party name (in Nynorsk)	Number of representatives
Labour Party (Arbeidarpartiet)	17
Conservative Party (Høgre)	4
Christian Democratic Party (Kristeleg Folkeparti)	5
Centre Party (Senterpartiet)	3
Liberal Party (Venstre)	6
Local List(s) (Lokale lister)	2
Total number of members:	37
Note: On 1 January 1964, Haus Municipality was divided between Osterøy Municipality and Arna Municipality.

Haus heradsstyre 1955–1959
Party name (in Nynorsk)	Number of representatives
Labour Party (Arbeidarpartiet)	17
Conservative Party (Høgre)	2
Christian Democratic Party (Kristeleg Folkeparti)	6
Farmers' Party (Bondepartiet)	3
Liberal Party (Venstre)	5
Local List(s) (Lokale lister)	4
Total number of members:	37

Haus heradsstyre 1951–1955
Party name (in Nynorsk)	Number of representatives
Labour Party (Arbeidarpartiet)	16
Conservative Party (Høgre)	1
Christian Democratic Party (Kristeleg Folkeparti)	7
Farmers' Party (Bondepartiet)	3
Liberal Party (Venstre)	5
Total number of members:	32

Haus heradsstyre 1947–1951
Party name (in Nynorsk)	Number of representatives
Labour Party (Arbeidarpartiet)	13
Conservative Party (Høgre)	1
Communist Party (Kommunistiske Parti)	1
Christian Democratic Party (Kristeleg Folkeparti)	5
Farmers' Party (Bondepartiet)	1
Liberal Party (Venstre)	8
Local List(s) (Lokale lister)	3
Total number of members:	32

Haus heradsstyre 1945–1947
Party name (in Nynorsk)	Number of representatives
Labour Party (Arbeidarpartiet)	10
Communist Party (Kommunistiske Parti)	2
Christian Democratic Party (Kristeleg Folkeparti)	7
Farmers' Party (Bondepartiet)	1
Liberal Party (Venstre)	4
Local List(s) (Lokale lister)	8
Total number of members:	32

Haus heradsstyre 1937–1941*
Party name (in Nynorsk)	Number of representatives
Labour Party (Arbeidarpartiet)	15
Farmers' Party (Bondepartiet)	2
Liberal Party (Venstre)	8
Joint List(s) of Non-Socialist Parties (Borgarlege Felleslister)	7
Total number of members:	32
Note: Due to the German occupation of Norway during World War II, no elections were held for new municipal councils until after the war ended in 1945.

=== Mayors ===
The mayor (Nynorsk: ordførar) of Haus Municipality was the political leader of the municipality and the chairperson of the municipal council. The following people held this position:

- 1838–1845: Julius Christopher Hammer
- 1846–1847: Johannes O. Veseth
- 1848–1851: Julius Christopher Hammer
- 1852–1853: Ole J. Borge
- 1854–1857: Julius Christopher Hammer
- 1858–1859: Christopher Julius Hammer
- 1860–1861: Anders J. Sandvig
- 1862–1863: Peter Jebsen
- 1864–1869: John L. Rognved
- 1870–1873: Rev. E. Meier
- 1874–1875: Mons J. Vevle
- 1876–1885: John L. Rognved
- 1886–1895: Ole J. Veseth
- 1896–1904: Magne J. Rognved
- 1905–1907: Ole J. Mjelde
- 1908–1910: Magne J. Rognved
- 1911–1919: Anders O. Sundland
- 1920–1925: Johan E. Rognved
- 1926–1934: Anders O. Sundland
- 1935–1937: Johan E. Rognved
- 1937–1937: Johan Garnes
- 1938–1940: G. Adolf Andersen
- 1945–1945: G. Adolf Andersen
- 1946–1947: Nils Garnes
- 1948–1951: Henrik A. Holsen
- 1952–1955: Hjalmar Romslo
- 1956–1964: Johannes Holmefjord

== See also ==
- List of former municipalities of Norway
