= Arna Municipality =

Former municipality in Hordaland, Norway

Arna Municipality Arna kommune
- Former municipality
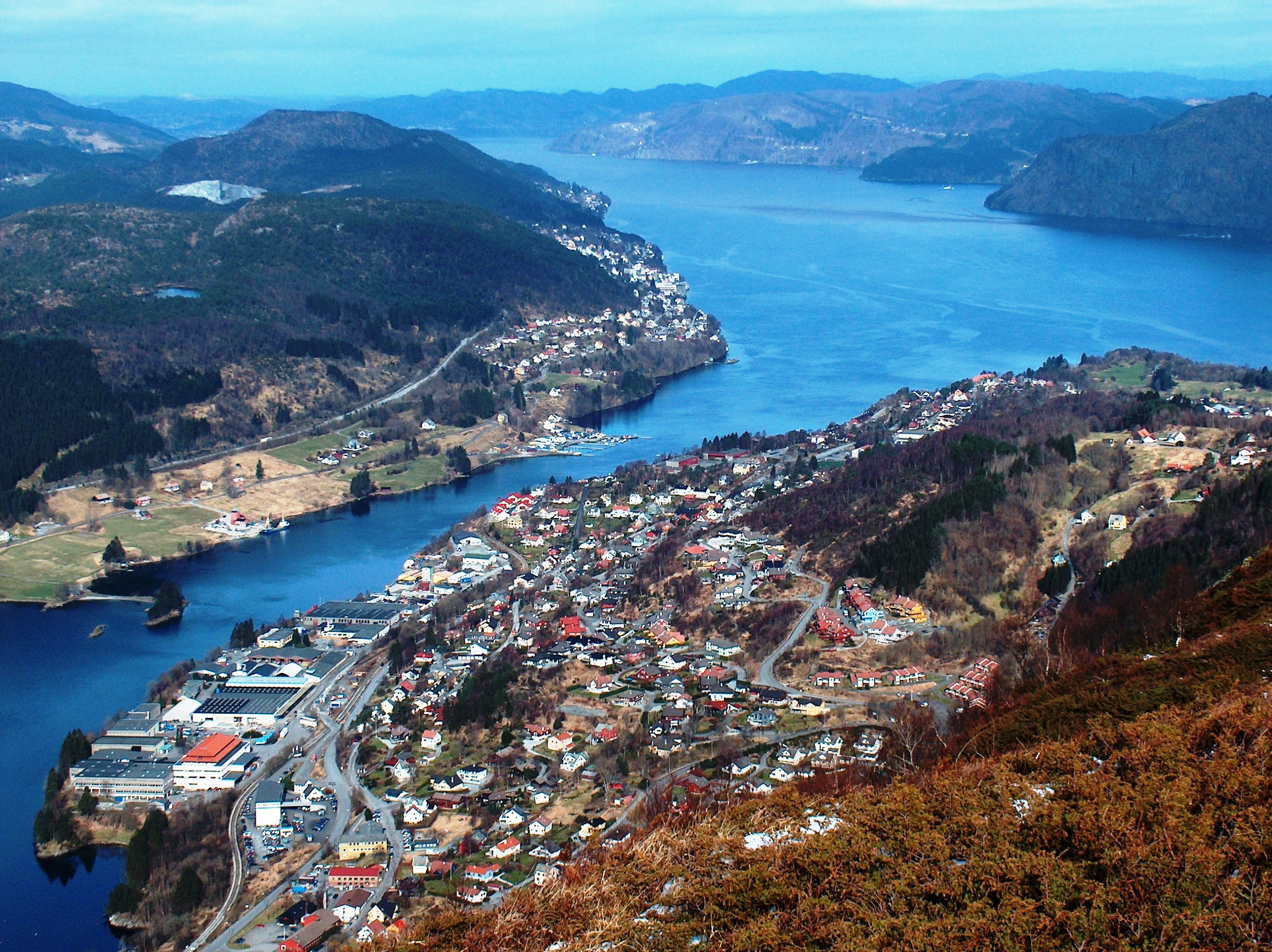
- View from Ådnanipa towards Indre Arna

- Hordaland within Norway

- Arna within Hordaland
- Coordinates: 60°25′03″N 05°28′15″E
- Country: Norway
- County: Hordaland
- District: Midhordland
- Established: 1 Jan 1964
  - Preceded by: Haus Municipality
- Disestablished: 1 Jan 1972
  - Succeeded by: Bergen Municipality
- Administrative centre: Indre Arna

Government
  - Mayor (1967–1971): Arne Ekeland (Ap)

Area
  - Total: 102.44 km^{2} (39.55 sq mi)
  - Rank: #379 in Norway
- Highest elevation: 987.68 m (3,240.4 ft)

Population (1971)
  - Total: 11,476
  - Rank: #69 in Norway
  - Density: 112/km^{2} (290/sq mi)
  - Change (10 years): ▲ +10.3%

Official language
  - Norwegian form: Nynorsk
- Time zone: UTC+01:00 (CET)
  - Summer (DST): UTC+02:00 (CEST)
- ISO 3166 code: NO-1250

Arna is a former municipality in the old Hordaland county, Norway. The 102.44-square-kilometre (39.55 sq mi) municipality existed from 1964 until its dissolution in 1972. The area is now part of Bergen Municipality in the traditional district of Midhordland in Vestland county. The administrative centre was the village of Indre Arna. Other villages in the municipality included Ytre Arna, Tunes, Trengereid, Espeland, and Garnes. The area of the former municipality makes up the present-day borough of Arna, east of the city centre of Bergen.

Prior to its dissolution in 1972, the 102.44-square-kilometre (39.55 sq mi) municipality was the 379th largest by area out of the 449 municipalities in Norway. Arna Municipality was the 69th most populous municipality in Norway with a population of about 11,476. The municipality's population density was 112 inhabitants per square kilometre (290/sq mi) and its population had increased by 10.3% over the previous 10-year period.

== General information ==
During the 1960s, there were many municipal mergers across Norway due to the work of the Schei Committee. On 1 January 1964, the large Haus Municipality was dissolved and its territories were divided up as follows:

- the part of Haus on the island of Osterøy became part of the new Osterøy Municipality
- the part of Haus located on the Bergen Peninsula became the new Arna Municipality (this municipality was short-lived due to its proximity to the growing city of Bergen.

On 1 January 1972, the city of Bergen was greatly expanded and the following areas were merged to for a new, much larger Bergen Municipality with over 200,000 residents:

- the city of Bergen (population: 111,925)
- all of Fana Municipality (population: 44,402)
- all of Laksevåg Municipality (population: 24,672)
- all of Åsane Municipality (population: 19,205)
- all of Arna Municipality (population: 11,766)

=== Name ===
The municipality (originally the parish) is named after the old Arne farm (Old Norse: Arnar). The name is the indefinite genitive case plural form of arinn which means "hearth" or "platform" or "cliff at the bottom of the sea". The name was likely an old name for near Arnavågen bay, a shallow bay that flows out into a deep fjord.

=== Churches ===
The Church of Norway had two parishes (sokn) within Arna Municipality. At the time of the municipal dissolution, it was part of the Arna prestegjeld and the Bergen domprosti (arch-deanery) in the Diocese of Bjørgvin.

Churches in Arna Municipality
Parish (sokn)	Church name	Location of the church	Year built
Arna	Arna Church	Indre Arna	1865
Arna	Takvam Chapel	Takvam	1912
Ytre Arna	Ytre Arna Church	Ytre Arna	1899

== Geography ==
The municipality encompassed the northeastern part of the Bergen Peninsula, along the Sørfjorden, bordering the city of Bergen across the mountains to the west. The municipality stretched from the village of Ytre Arna to Trengereid along the fjord coast and then inland about 8 kilometres (5.0 mi) to the Espeland area. The highest point in the municipality was the 987.68-metre (3,240.4 ft) tall mountain Gullfjelltoppen.

Åsane Municipality was located to the northwest, Osterøy Municipality was located to the north, Vaksdal Municipality was located to the northeast, Samnanger Municipality was located to the southeast, Fana Municipality was located to the south, and Bergen Municipality was located to the west.

== Government ==
While it existed, Arna Municipality was responsible for primary education (through 10th grade), outpatient health services, senior citizen services, welfare and other social services, zoning, economic development, and municipal roads and utilities. The municipality was governed by a municipal council of directly elected representatives. The mayor was indirectly elected by a vote of the municipal council. The municipality was under the jurisdiction of the Gulating Court of Appeal.

=== Municipal council ===
The municipal council (Kommunestyre) of Arna Municipality was made up of 37 representatives that were elected to four year terms. The tables below show the historical composition of the council by political party.

Arna kommunestyre 1967–1971
Party name (in Nynorsk)	Number of representatives
Labour Party (Arbeidarpartiet)	19
Conservative Party (Høgre)	5
Christian Democratic Party (Kristeleg Folkeparti)	4
Centre Party (Senterpartiet)	2
Socialist People's Party (Sosialistisk Folkeparti)	1
Liberal Party (Venstre)	6
Total number of members:	37
Note: On 1 January 1972, Arna Municipality became part of Bergen Municipality.

Arna kommunestyre 1964–1967
Party name (in Nynorsk)	Number of representatives
Labour Party (Arbeidarpartiet)	20
Conservative Party (Høgre)	5
Christian Democratic Party (Kristeleg Folkeparti)	4
Centre Party (Senterpartiet)	2
Liberal Party (Venstre)	6
Total number of members:	37

=== Mayors ===
The mayor (Nynorsk: ordførar) of Arna Municipality was the political leader of the municipality and the chairperson of the municipal council. The following people have held this position:

- 1964–1967: Gustav Holtan
- 1967–1971: Arne Ekeland (Ap)

== See also ==
- List of former municipalities of Norway
