= Arna =

Arna may refer to:

== People ==
- Arna Bontemps (1902–1973), African-American poet, novelist, librarian, and member of the Harlem Renaissance
- Arna Lára Jónsdóttir (born 1976), Icelandic politician
- Arna Mer-Khamis (1929–1995), Israeli Jewish political and human rights activist
- Arna Selznick, Canadian director and artist, known for directing Nelvana's 1985 animated film The Care Bears Movie
- Arna Sif Pálsdóttir (born 1988), Icelandic team handball player
- Arna Vågen (1905–2005), Norwegian missionary and politician for the Christian Democratic Party
- Lissy Arna (1900–1964), German film actress

== Places ==
Italy

- Diocese of Arna, an ancient city and former bishopric, now Civitella d'Arna frazione in Perugia city, and a Latin Catholic titular see

Greece

- Arna, Greece, a village in Laconia, Peloponnesus, peninsular Greece

Norway

- Arna Municipality, a former municipality in the old Hordaland county, Norway (now part of Bergen)
- Indre Arna and Ytre Arna, two neighboring villages in the municipality of Bergen in Norway
- Arna, Bergen, a borough in the city of Bergen, Norway
- Arna Church, a church in the city of Bergen, Norway

Turkey

- Xanthos, an ancient Lycian city known by the Lycians as Arna

USA

- Arna Township, Pine County, Minnesota, a township in Pine County, Minnesota

== Transportation ==
- Ärna (or Uppsala Airport), an airport northwest of Uppsala, Sweden
- Arna Station, a railway station in the city of Bergen, Norway
- Arna Tunnel, a proposed road tunnel in Norway

== Other ==
- Arna-Bjørnar, an association football club from Bergen, Norway
- Arna (moth), a genus of moths in the subfamily Lymantriinae
- Arna (publication), a journal of the Faculty of Arts, University of Sydney
- Alfa Romeo Arna, a type of Italian car
