= Elizabeth Stephansen =

Norwegian mathematician and educator

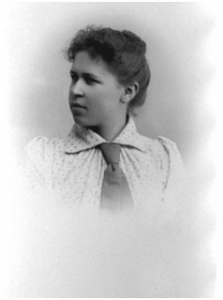

(Mary Ann) Elizabeth Stephansen (10 March 1872 – 23 February 1961) was a Norwegian mathematician and educator. She was one of the first Norwegian women to be awarded a doctorate degree.

== Biography ==
Stephansen was born in Bergen, Norway. She was the eldest daughter of Anton Stephan Stephansen (1845–1929) and Gerche Reimers Jahn (1848–1935). Her father was a merchant and owner of a textile shop. He later established the textile factory, Espelandfos Spinderi & Tricotagefabrik, in Arna. She was educated at the Bergen Cathedral School graduating in 1891. She was fluent in the German language and traveled to Switzerland to continue her education. She attended Eidgenössische Polytechnikum in Zurich and graduated in 1896. Her thesis Ueber partielle Differentialgleichungen vierter Ordnung die ein intermediäres Integral besitzen was published in 1902. She obtained her doctorate (Dr. Philos.) in absentia from the University of Zurich in the fall of 1902.

In 1902–1903, she traveled to the University of Göttingen under a government grant to attend lectures by noted German mathematicians, Ernst Zermelo, David Hilbert and Felix Klein. She first served as a teacher of mathematics at Bergen Cathedral School and Bergen Technical School. Between 1905–1906, she completed mathematical research and wrote further papers on difference equations. From 1906 until her retirement in 1937 she worked at the Agricultural College of Norway at Ås in Akershus. She first taught physics and mathematics. In 1921, she was appointed Docent in mathematics.

In retirement, she lived at the family farm at Espeland in Arna (Espeland, gnr. 289, gårdsbruk i Arna) which her father had first acquired during 1918. After the liberation of Norway in 1945, she was awarded the King's Medal of Merit (Kongens fortjenstmedalje) for the assistance she rendered to Norwegian prisoners held at the Nazi operated Espeland concentration camp (Espeland fangeleir). She died in 1961 at Espeland in the modern-day borough of Arna, and was buried at Solheim Cemetery in the Årstad district of Bergen.

== Other sources ==
- Kari Hag and Peter Lindqvist (1997) Elizabeth Stephansen: A pioneer Skrifter det Kongelige Norske Videnskabers Selskab 2, 1-23.
- Catharine M. C. Haines (2001) "Stephansen, Mary Ann Elizabeth" in International Women in Science: A Bibliographical Dictionary to 1950 (Santa Barbara, CA: ABC-CLIO, Inc., pgs 295-296) ISBN 1-57607-090-5

== Related reading ==
- Gila Hanna, ed. (2006) Towards Gender Equity in Mathematics Education (Volume 3 of New ICMI Study Series. Springer Science & Business Media) ISBN 9780306472053
