= Haus, Osterøy =

Haus Hausvik
- Village
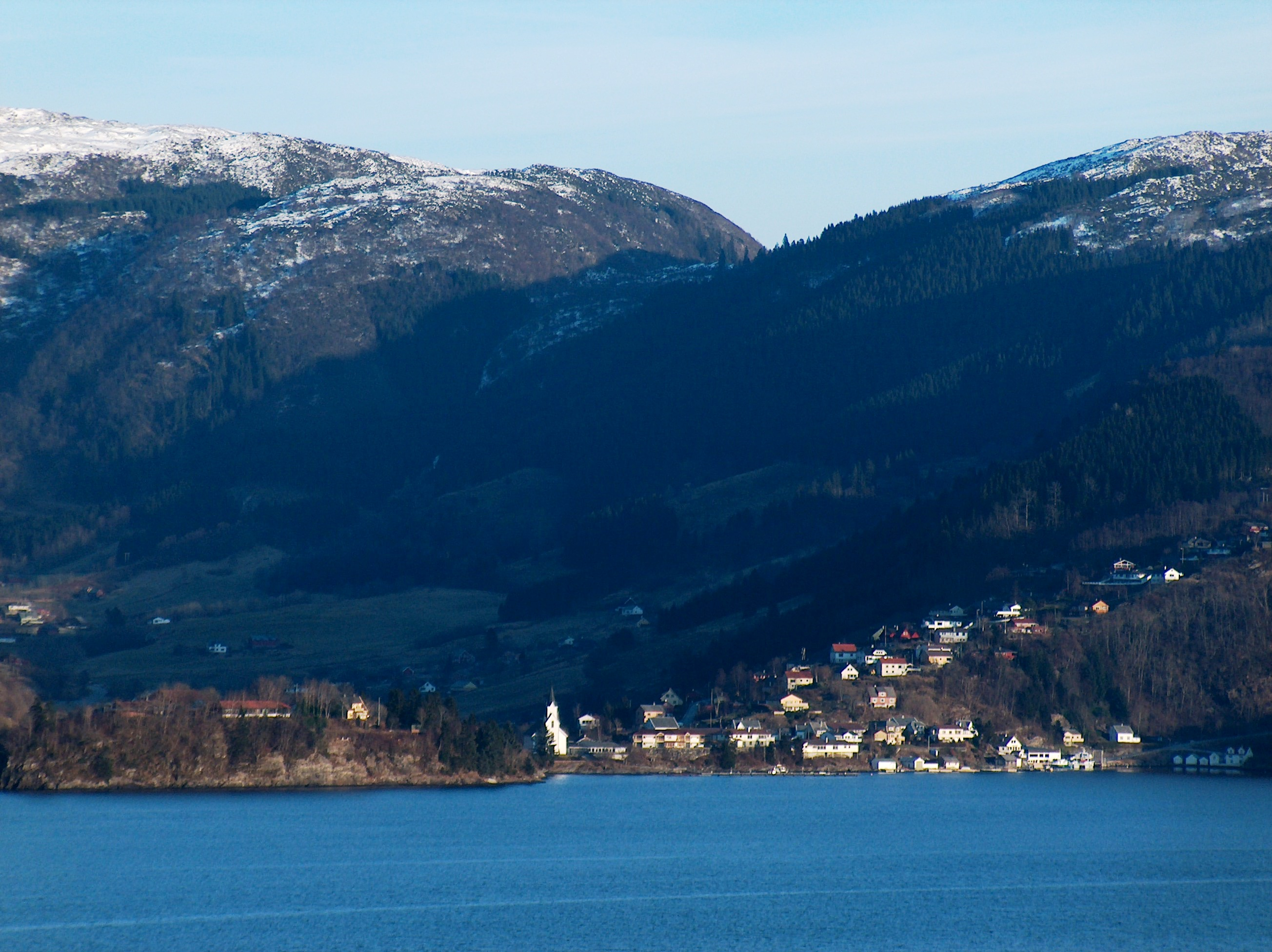
- View of the village
- Interactive map of Haus
- Coordinates: 60.4531°N 5.49603°E
- Country: Norway
- Region: Western Norway
- County: Vestland
- District: Nordhordland
- Municipality: Osterøy Municipality

Area
  - Total: 0.35 km^{2} (0.14 sq mi)
- Elevation: 8 m (26 ft)

Population (2025)
  - Total: 583
  - Density: 1,666/km^{2} (4,310/sq mi)
- Time zone: UTC+01:00 (CET)
  - Summer (DST): UTC+02:00 (CEST)
- Post Code: 5286 Haus

Haus (or Hausvik) is a village in Osterøy Municipality in Vestland county, Norway. The village is located on the southwestern coast of the island of Osterøy along the Sørfjorden. The village lies across the Sørfjorden from the villages of Ytre Arna and Garnes. The village of Valestrandfossen lies about 7 kilometres (4.3 mi) north along the fjord.

The 0.35-square-kilometre (86-acre) village has a population (2025) of 583 and a population density of 1,666 inhabitants per square kilometre (4,310/sq mi).

The Osterøy Bridge is located about 4 kilometres (2.5 mi) south of the village, connecting Osterøy island to the mainland of Bergen Municipality. Before the opening of the bridge in 1997, there was a regular ferry route from Haus to Garnes. The ferry route was discontinued after the bridge opened.

Haus Church is located in the village, serving the southwestern part of Osterøy. The village of Haus was the administrative centre of the old Haus Municipality that existed from 1838 until 1964.
