= Bronze Head of Hypnos from Civitella d'Arna =

Bronze Head

Bronze Head of Hypnos
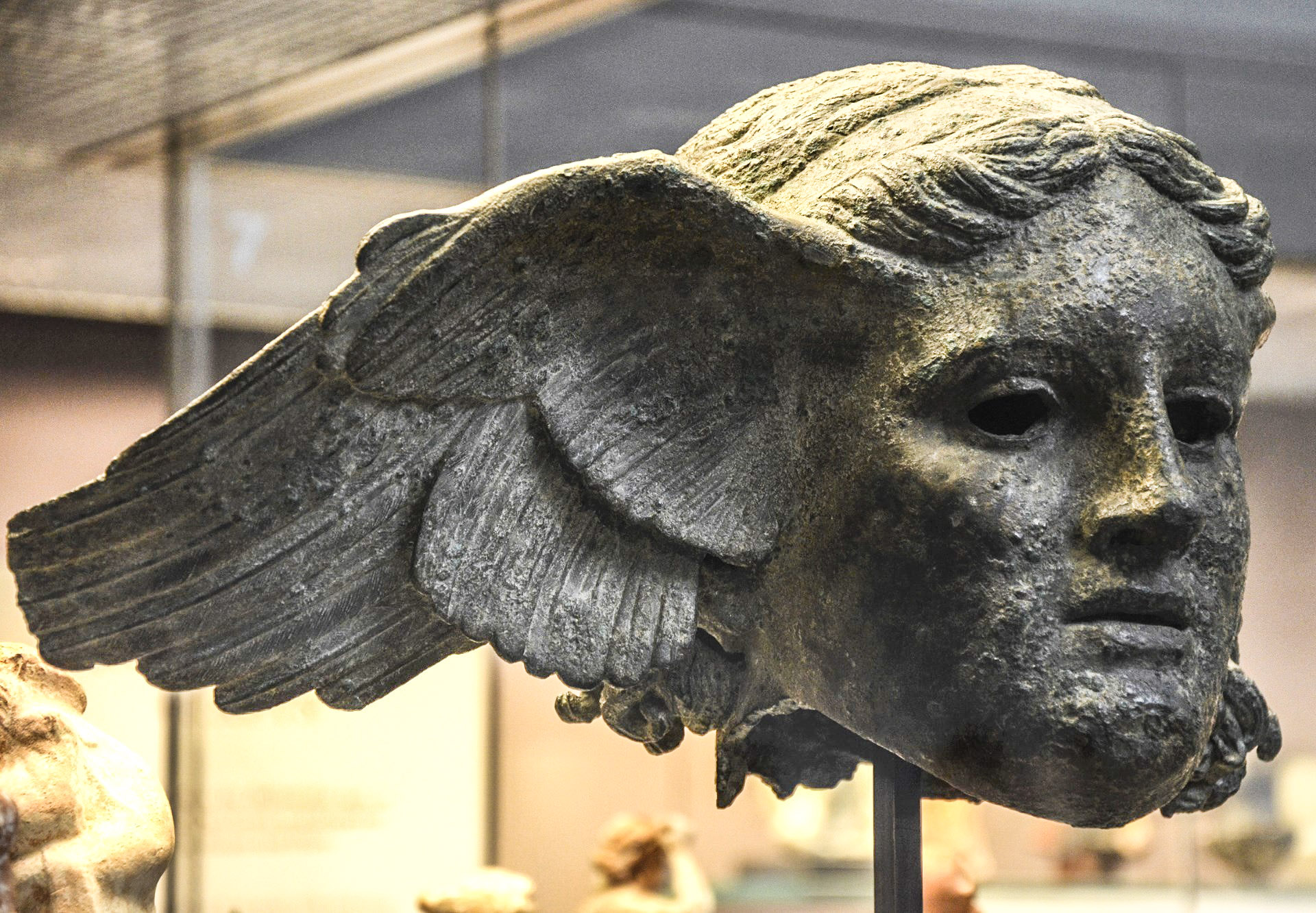
- Bronze Head of Hypnos on display in the British Museum
- Material: Bronze
- Size: 21 cm high
- Created: 1st-2nd Century AD
- Present location: British Museum, London
- Registration: GR 1868.6-6.9 (Bronze 267)

The Bronze Head of Hypnos is a Roman copy of an ancient Greek statue found at Civitella d'Arna near Perugia in central Italy. Widely copied since its discovery in the early nineteenth century, it has been part of the British Museum's collection since 1868.

== Description ==
Only the head of the bronze statue is extant. The face shows wings emerging from his right temple and elaborately woven locks of hair held in by a head band. As the god of sleep, the intact statue would have shown the deity walking forwards, clutching a drinking horn and poppies in his hands. Sculptural images of Hypnos are unusual, and only a handful of similar statues are known in Western Europe.

== Provenance ==
The bronze head was originally discovered in the small Umbrian town of Civitella d'Arna. Little is known of the circumstances of the find until it became part of the Castellani Collection. The British Museum purchased the bronze sculpture, along with other parts of the collection, in 1868.
