= Civitella d'Arna =

Coordinates: 43.128°N 12.487°E

- Frazione
- Location of Civitella d'Arna in Italy
- Country: Italy
- Region: Umbria
- Province: Perugia (PG)
- Comune: Perugia
- Time zone: UTC+1 (CET)
  - Summer (DST): UTC+2 (CEST)

Civitella d'Arna is a frazione of the comune (municipality) of Perugia in central Italy, and the Ancient city and former bishopric Arna, which remains a Latin Catholic titular see.

== Town ==
What was once an important town but now only a village of some 350 inhabitants stands atop a small hill (333 metres above sea level) about 9 kilometres east of the city of Perugia, the capital of Umbria (and of Perugia Province). On one side, it provides a view of that city along its main axis from the bell towers of San Pietro and San Domenico, to the Rocca Paolina fortress, the bell tower of the Palazzo dei Priori, the gateway of Porta Sole and the Convent of Monteripido. On the other side, it looks towards Assisi, Spello, Trevi, Bastia, the dome of Santa Maria degli Angeli, and beyond them to Foligno, Bevagna, Montefalco, and as far as the Rocca (castle) of Spoleto.

== History ==
Civitella d'Arna boasts of Umbrian origins, but it was the Etruscans who were chiefly responsible for its development in the 4th century BC. The Ancient name Arna in the Etruscan language meant "river current" and probably referred to its position between the rivers Tiber and Arno. Under Roman rule, it continued to be important and was the seat of a bishop by the end of the 5th century AD, in the last decade of which a Bishop Vitalianus held the see.

The barbarian hordes of Totila devastated it in 548–549 and it ceased to be an episcopal see. The centuries-long struggles between Byzantines and Lombards brought further decline to the town, which saw its bishopric suppressed in 588 or 589. Only in the 13th century was the building of its hilltop castle completed.

== Titular see ==
At the request of the then Archbishop of Perugia, the Holy See acknowledged the former existence of the residential bishopric of Arna, by inserting its name among the Latin titular sees recognized by the Catholic Church. as Latin Titular bishopric of Arna (Latin = Curiate Italian) / Arien(sis) (Latin adjective).

It has had the following incumbent(s), so far of the fitting Episcopal (lowest) rank :

- Camillo Ballin, Comboni Missionaries (M.C.C.J.) (2005.07.14 – ...), as Apostolic Vicar of Northern Arabia (Kuwait-based).

== Sights ==
- The 13th-century castle stands on foundations of a Roman-era cistern, whose remains can be seen. It underwent adjustments under the local noble families of the Sozi, the Degli Azzi Vitelleschi, the Spinola, and the present owners, the Baldelli. It has an entrance bastion and a fine 14th-century arch. Traces of walls of the Etruscan and Roman periods are built into its outer walls.
- A 19th-century parish church inside the castle. It contains a 1492 gonfalone attributed to Bartolomeo Caporali, a painting on wood by Domenico Bruschi of Perugia, a 19th-century crucifix, a Deruta ceramic of the end of the 16th century, and a fresco attributed to Giannicola di Paolo, of the school of Perugino. The bronze church bells of 1850 weigh respectively 536, 264 e 127 kilograms.
- A ruined 11th-century chapel in the cemetery.
- The 17th-century convent of the Filippini Fathers, summer residence of the Filippini of the Chiesa Nuova in Perugia. Walls of Roman cisterns serve as its foundations. The 14th-century chapel has 18th-century stuccoes and a painting on canvas by Francesco Appiani.
- A 1562 fountain at Osteria built by Francesco di Orsino Sozi to a design by the architect Guido Caporali.
- Villa Floramonti (17th century) on the road to Sant'Egidio, built by Cardinal Pompeo Floramonti.

Many archaeological finds from the area are on display in the Archaeological Museum of Perugia. However, a bronze head of Hypnos (the god of sleep), perhaps a 1st or 2nd-century AD copy of a Hellenistic original, was found at Civitella d'Arna in the early nineteenth century and is now part of the Castellani Collection in the British Museum.

== See also ==
- Arna, for (partial) namesakes
- List of Catholic dioceses in Italy

== Sources and external links ==
- Associazione Proarna di Civitella d'Arna
- History of Arna
- GCatholic - (former and) titular see
- The bells
- Bronze head of Hypnos
- Associazione Proarna di Civitella - Local news

Bibliography - ecclesiastical history

- Francesco Lanzoni, Le diocesi d'Italia dalle origini al principio del secolo VII (an. 604), vol. I, Faenza 1927, p. 480
