= Tunes, Norway =

Tunes
- Neighborhood in Bergen
- Interactive map of Tunes
- Coordinates: 60.4315°N 5.4976°E
- Country: Norway
- Region: Western Norway
- County: Vestland
- Municipality: Bergen
- Borough: Arna
- Elevation: 51 m (167 ft)
- Time zone: UTC+01:00 (CET)
  - Summer (DST): UTC+02:00 (CEST)

Tunes is a suburban village in the borough of Arna in Bergen Municipality in Vestland county, Norway. It is a part of the urban area of Arna, which has a population of 9,744.
