= Old Voss Line =

Heritage railway in Norway

Norwegian: Gamle Vossebanen
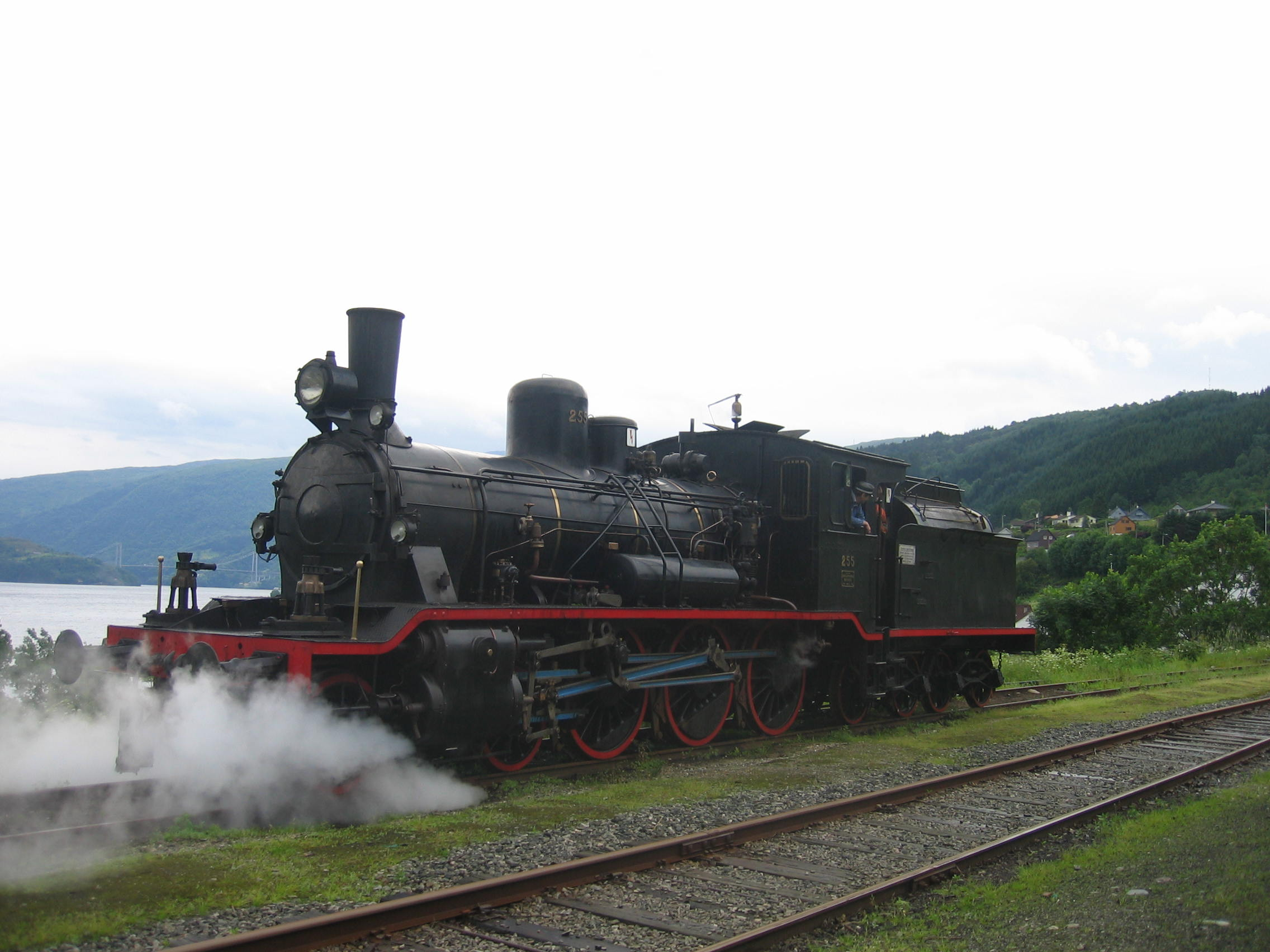
- Type 18 locomotive no. 255 at Garnes
- Locale: Norway
- Terminus: Garnes & Midttun
- Connections: Norges Statsbaner

Commercial operations
- Built by: Norges Statsbaner
- Original gauge: 1,067 mm (3 ft 6 in); 1,435 mm (4 ft 8 1/2 in) standard gauge
- Original electrification: 15 kV 16.7 Hz AC

Preserved operations
- Owned by: Norwegian Railway Society
- Operated by: Norwegian Railway Society
- Length: 18 km (11 mi)
- Preserved gauge: 1,435 mm (4 ft 8 1/2 in) standard gauge
- Preserved electrification: None

Commercial history
- Opened: 1883
- 1904: Gauge converted
- Closed to passengers: 1964
- Closed: still open for freight

Preservation history
- Headquarters: Garnes

Website
- Old Voss Line web site

The Old Voss Line (Norwegian: Gamle Vossebanen) is a heritage railway between Garnes and Midttun near Bergen, Norway.

Originally constructed as a 1,067 mm (3 ft 6 in) narrow gauge line, it formed part of the Bergen to Voss railway opened in 1883. Following the decision to complete the railway to Oslo in 1,435 mm (4 ft 8 1/2 in) standard gauge, the line was upgraded in 1904. Electrified in 1954, it continued to serve as part of the Bergen to Oslo main line until the Arnanipa Tunnel and the 7.5 km (4.7 mi) Ulriken Tunnel, which opened in 1964, resulted in the closure of the line for passenger traffic. The line is still open for freight traffic.

Today, the museum railway is operated by the Norwegian Railway Association (Norsk Jernbaneklubb) and runs on Sundays between June and September over a distance of 18 km (11 mi) between Garnes and Midttun, taking just under one hour. The Midttun terminus is located near Nesttun, and there are further intermediate stops at Arna, Espeland and Haukeland. The service operates with a type 18 steam locomotive, no. 255, built in 1913, decommissioned in 1969 and restored by volunteers between 1981 and 1993. It pulls a series of teak coaches built between 1921 and 1938. The locomotive is stored in the engine shed at the restored Garnes station that features a museum, a coach shed, a yard and turntable.

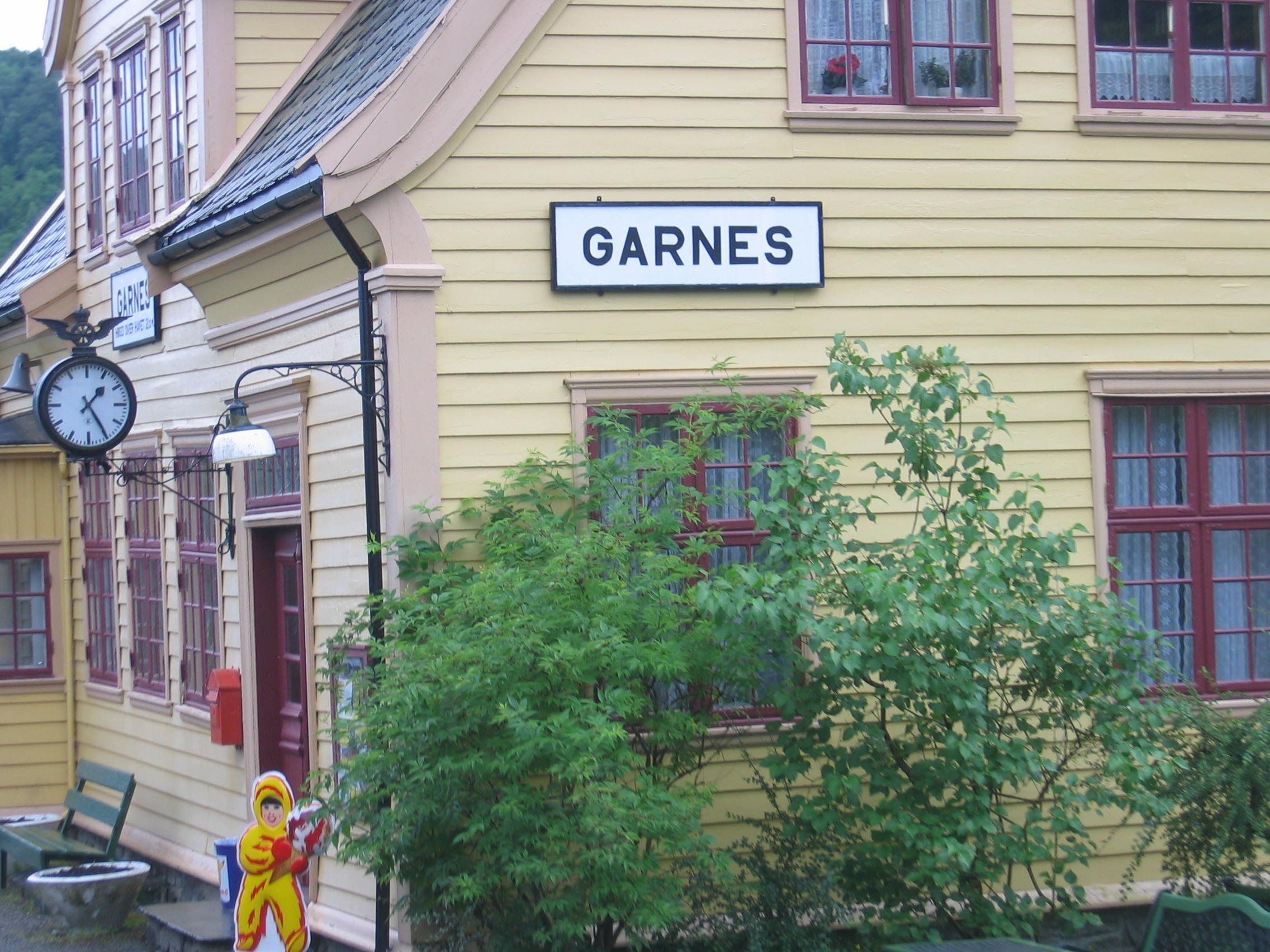
The restored Garnes Station
