= Arna Tunnel =

Proposed road tunnel in Norway

Coordinates: 60°24′14″N 5°24′10″E

The Arna Tunnel (Norwegian: Arnatunnelen) was a proposed road tunnel which would run from Arna through the mountain Ulriken to Minde or Nygårdstangen in Bergen, Norway. It was planned to have two tubes, four lanes, and would be 8 kilometres (5.0 mi) long. It would shorten the distance of European Road 16 (E16) between Bergen and Arna by 15 kilometres (9.3 mi).

Currently E16 runs north from Arna to Åsane as a limited-access road and then runs concurrently with E39 as a four-lane motorway to the city center, a distance of 24 kilometres (15 mi). By building a tunnel directly from Arna to the city centre, this distance would be reduced to 8 kilometers (5.0 mi). Alternatively, cars can drive via County Road 580 via Nesttun, which is 22 kilometres (14 mi) to the city center, but this road has much lower standard than E16. The Arna Tunnel would allow a 15-minute reduction in travel time for all cars running from the city centre and from Bergen West, including Askøy and Sotra, eastwards, including the main routes to Oslo. It would also give the same time saving for transport for commuter from Arna, Voss, parts of Hardanger and Osterøy, and would remove the need for the ferry from Osterøy, as all of Osterøy could use the Osterøy Bridge.

In contrast to the roadway, the Bergen Line runs through the mountain in the Ulriken Tunnel, and Vy Tog operate a service with the Bergen Commuter Rail between Bergen Station and Arna Station every 30 minutes. The Norwegian National Rail Administration is planning to expand the Ulriken Tunnel to double track, which would allow increased traffic on the whole Bergen Line and a 15-minute headway on the Bergen–Arna service. The construction is scheduled for completion in 2016. An alternative has been to build a branch of the Bergen Light Rail to Arna through its own tunnel through Ulrikken.

Nygårdstangen acts as the main interchange in the city center, and distributes traffic between the city centre, traffic westwards along National Road 555 via the Nygård Tunnel, southwards along E39 along the Nygård Bridge and northwards along E39 and E16 through the Fløyfjell Tunnel. By 2015, it is estimated that the interchange would have 97,000 vehicles per day if the Arna Tunnel is not built, and 114,000 vehicles per day if the Arna Tunnel is built. This exceeds the interchange's capacity, and would result in severe congestion. A possible remedy is to build both the Arna Tunnel and extend the Fløyfjell Tunnel to the planned Minde Tunnel, which would run from Fjøsanger to Danmarksplass. This would require the Arna Tunnel to be built after the Minde Tunnel, the latter which is not included in any plans until 2019. If the Arna Tunnel is built, buses operating to Arna would probably continue through the tunnel to the city centre, thus ending the commuter train service. This would give an increased number of buses through the city centre, which is already experiencing bus congestion.

The Ulriken Tunnel is being expanded to double track during 2016-2020 which instead will increase the train traffic. The Road administration has decided not to build to build the Arna Tunnel, instead build a Ring road East around 2030-2035. It will be a 4 lane road east of the Ulriken mountain, bypassing the city Bergen, and including a shorter tunnel at Fjøsanger and eastwards.
