= Haus Church =

Church in Vestland, Norway

- Haus kyrkje
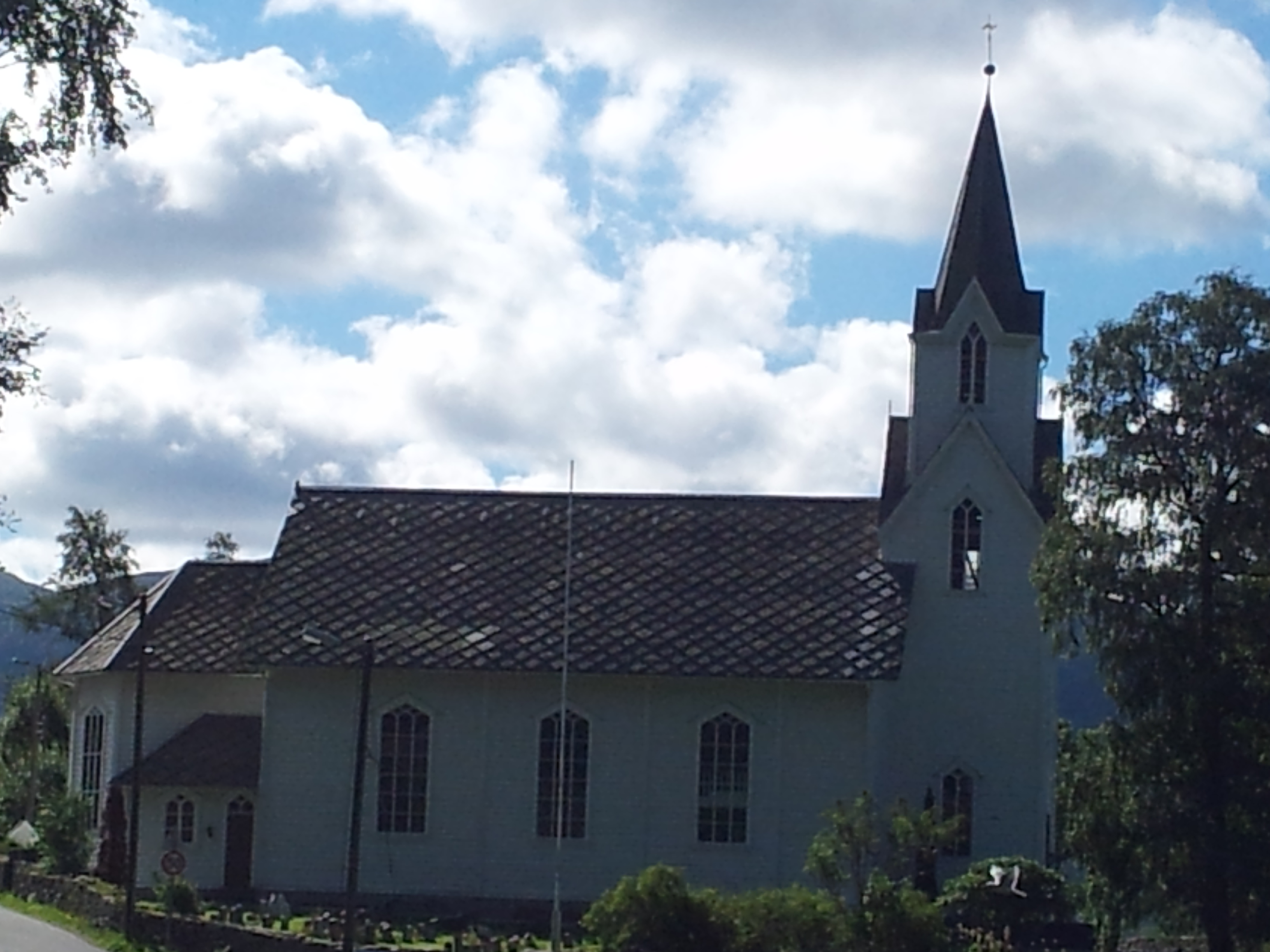
- View of the church
- Haus Church
- 60°27′14″N 5°29′38″E
- Location: Osterøy Municipality, Vestland
- Country: Norway
- Denomination: Church of Norway
- Previous denomination: Catholic Church
- Churchmanship: Evangelical Lutheran

History
- Former name: Hougs kirke
- Status: Parish church
- Founded: 13th century
- Consecrated: 19 May 1874

Architecture
- Functional status: Active
- Architect: Ole Vangberg
- Architectural type: Long church
- Completed: 1874 (152 years ago)

Specifications
- Capacity: 460
- Materials: Wood

Administration
- Diocese: Bjørgvin bispedømme
- Deanery: Åsane prosti
- Parish: Haus
- Norwegian Cultural Heritage Site
- Type: Church
- Status: Not protected
- ID: 84508

Haus Church (Norwegian: Haus kyrkje) is a parish church of the Church of Norway in Osterøy Municipality in Vestland county, Norway. It is located in the village of Haus on the western shore of the island of Osterøy. It is the church for the Haus parish which is part of the Åsane prosti (deanery) in the Diocese of Bjørgvin. The white, wooden church was built in a long church design in 1874 using plans drawn up by the architect Ole Vangberg. The church seats about 460 people.

== History ==
The earliest existing historical records of the church date back to the early 1300s when it was mentioned in a church land register, the Bergens kalvskinn, but the church was built before this was written. The first church in Haus was a wooden stave church that was likely first built in the 13th century. The church was dedicated to St. Nikolas.

Around the year 1613, the old church was replaced by a timber-framed long church with one tower that was probably similar design to the nearby Hamre Church. The church had a nave that measured about 15 by 9.5 metres (49 ft × 31 ft) and a choir that measured about 7.5 by 7.5 metres (25 ft × 25 ft). The church weathered several damaging storms. In 1702, the spire atop the tower blew down in a storm and broke. Again in 1719 and 1720, there were hundreds of roof tiles that blew off the roof. In 1724, the church was sold during the Norwegian church auction by the King who was raising money to pay off debts from the Great Northern War. The church was purchased by Christian Krogh from Bergen at the auction.

In 1814, this church served as an election church (Norwegian: valgkirke). Together with more than 300 other parish churches across Norway, it was a polling station for elections to the 1814 Norwegian Constituent Assembly which wrote the Constitution of Norway. This was Norway's first national elections. Each church parish was a constituency that elected people called "electors" who later met together in each county to elect the representatives for the assembly that was to meet at Eidsvoll Manor later that year.

The church changed ownership several times over the decades. In 1861, the current owner of the church sold it to the municipality and it was no longer privately owned. The municipality then decided that the church needed to be replaced. In 1874, a new church was built slightly to the south of the old building. The architect was Old Vangberg and the lead builders were Askild Aase and Mikjel Svenheim. The new church was consecrated on 19 May 1874. After the new church was completed, the old church was torn down. In 1939, the church was renovated under the direction of the architect Ole Landmark. Again in 1975, the church was renovated by Claus Lindstrøm.

== Media gallery ==
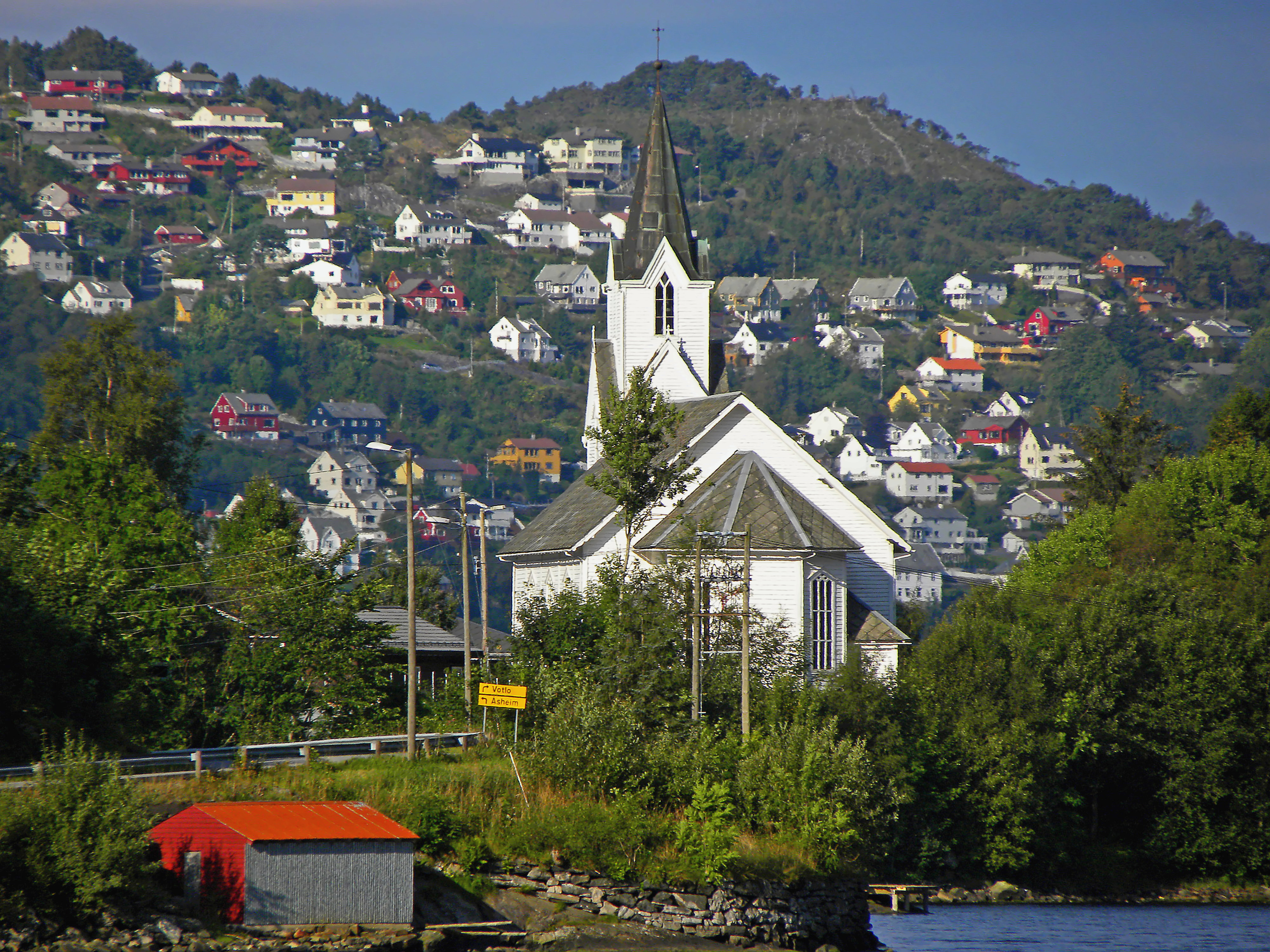

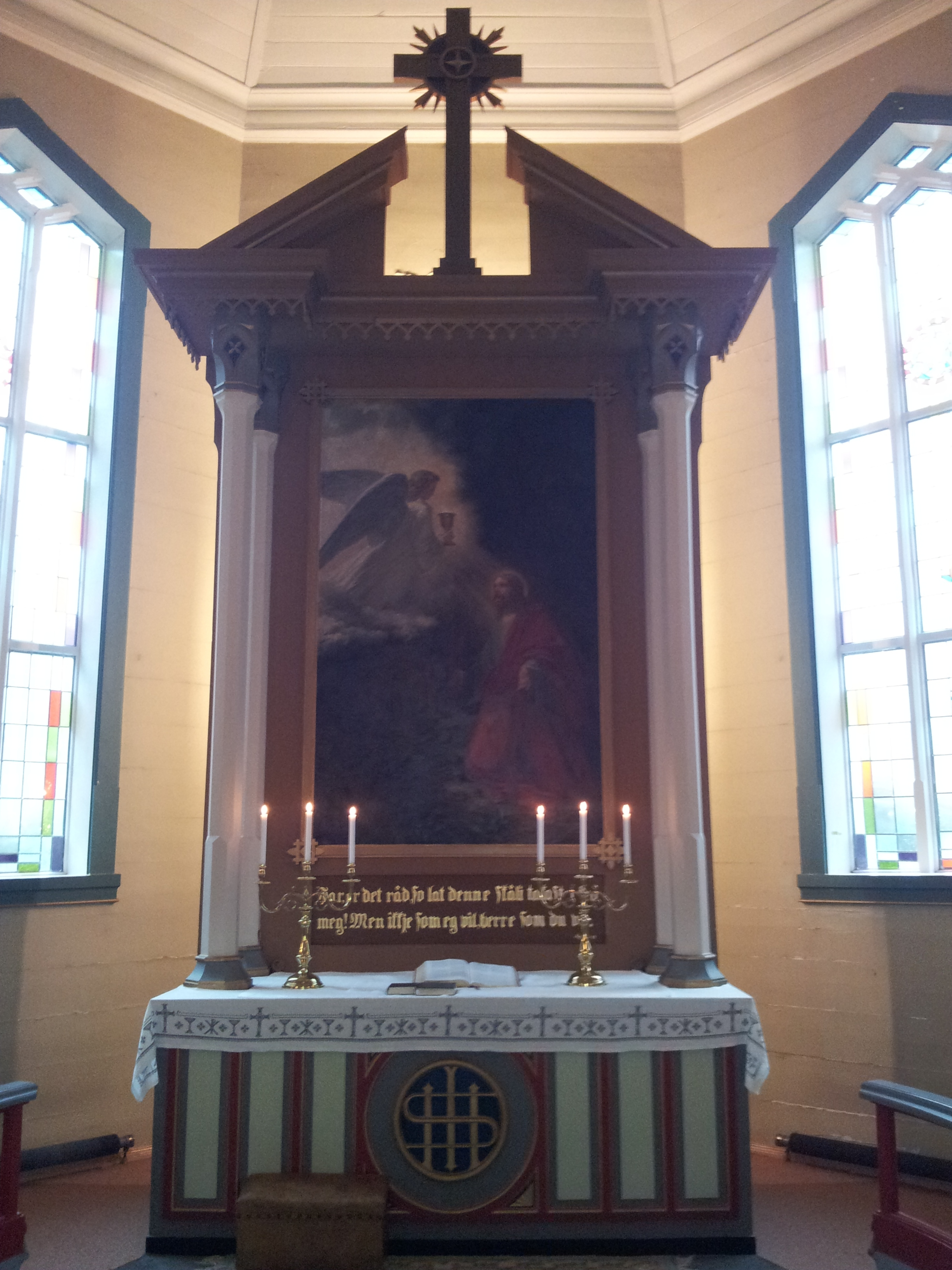

== See also ==
- List of churches in Bjørgvin
