= Ytre Arna Church =

Church in Vestland, Norway

- Ytre Arna kirke
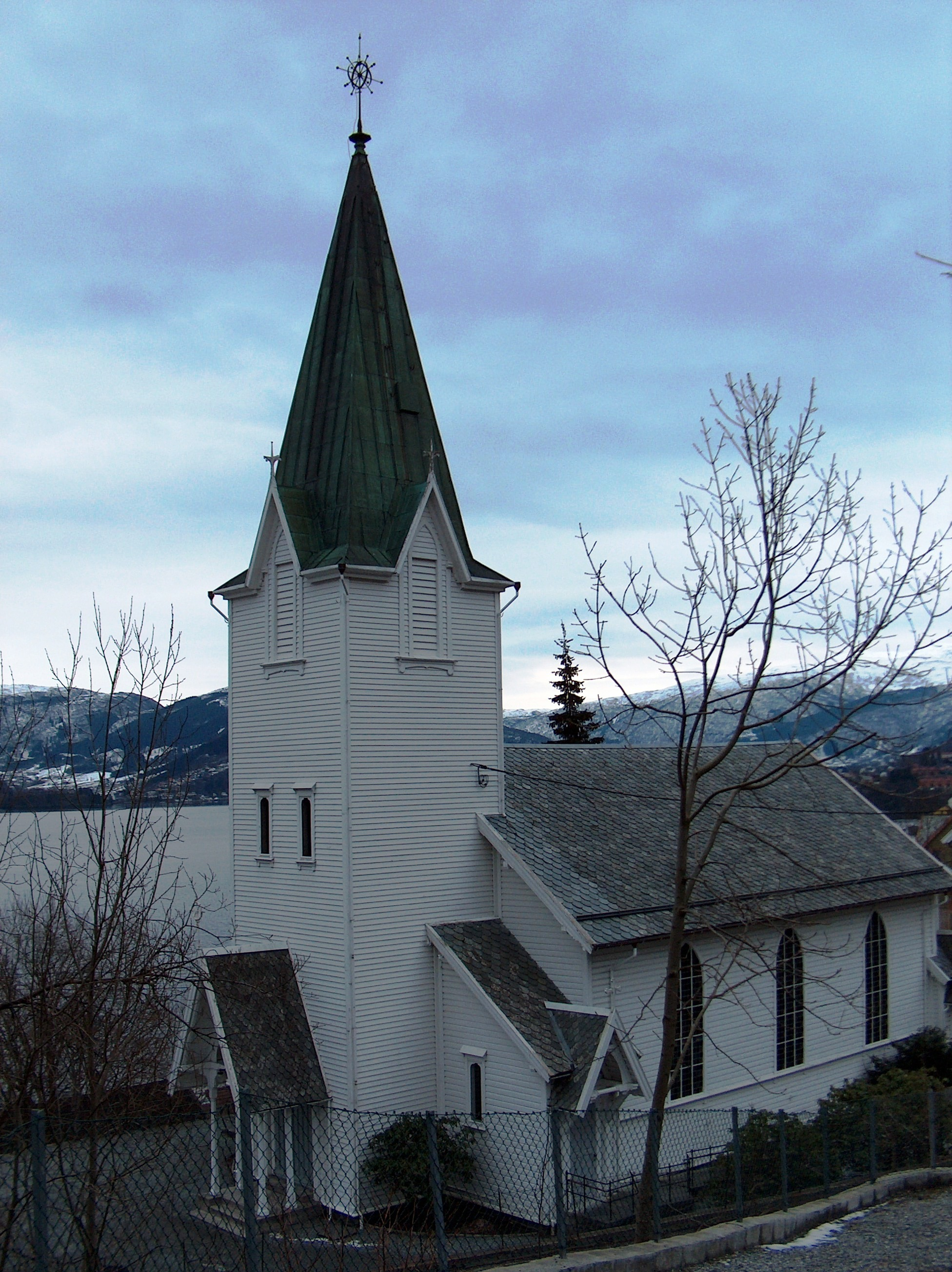
- View of the church
- Ytre Arna Church
- 60°27′29″N 5°26′22″E
- Location: Bergen Municipality, Vestland
- Country: Norway
- Denomination: Church of Norway
- Churchmanship: Evangelical Lutheran

History
- Status: Parish church
- Founded: 1899
- Consecrated: 5 Nov 1899

Architecture
- Functional status: Active
- Architect: Schak Bull
- Architectural type: Long church
- Completed: 1899 (127 years ago)

Specifications
- Capacity: 250
- Materials: Wood

Administration
- Diocese: Bjørgvin bispedømme
- Deanery: Åsane prosti
- Parish: Ytre Arna
- Norwegian Cultural Heritage Site
- Type: Church
- Status: Listed
- ID: 85890

Ytre Arna Church (Norwegian: Ytre Arna kirke) is a parish church of the Church of Norway in Bergen Municipality in Vestland county, Norway. It is located in the village of Ytre Arna in the borough of Åsane. It is the church for the Ytre Arna parish which is part of the Åsane prosti (deanery) in the Diocese of Bjørgvin. The white, wooden church was built in a long church design in 1899 using plans drawn up by the architect Schak Bull. The church seats about 250 people.

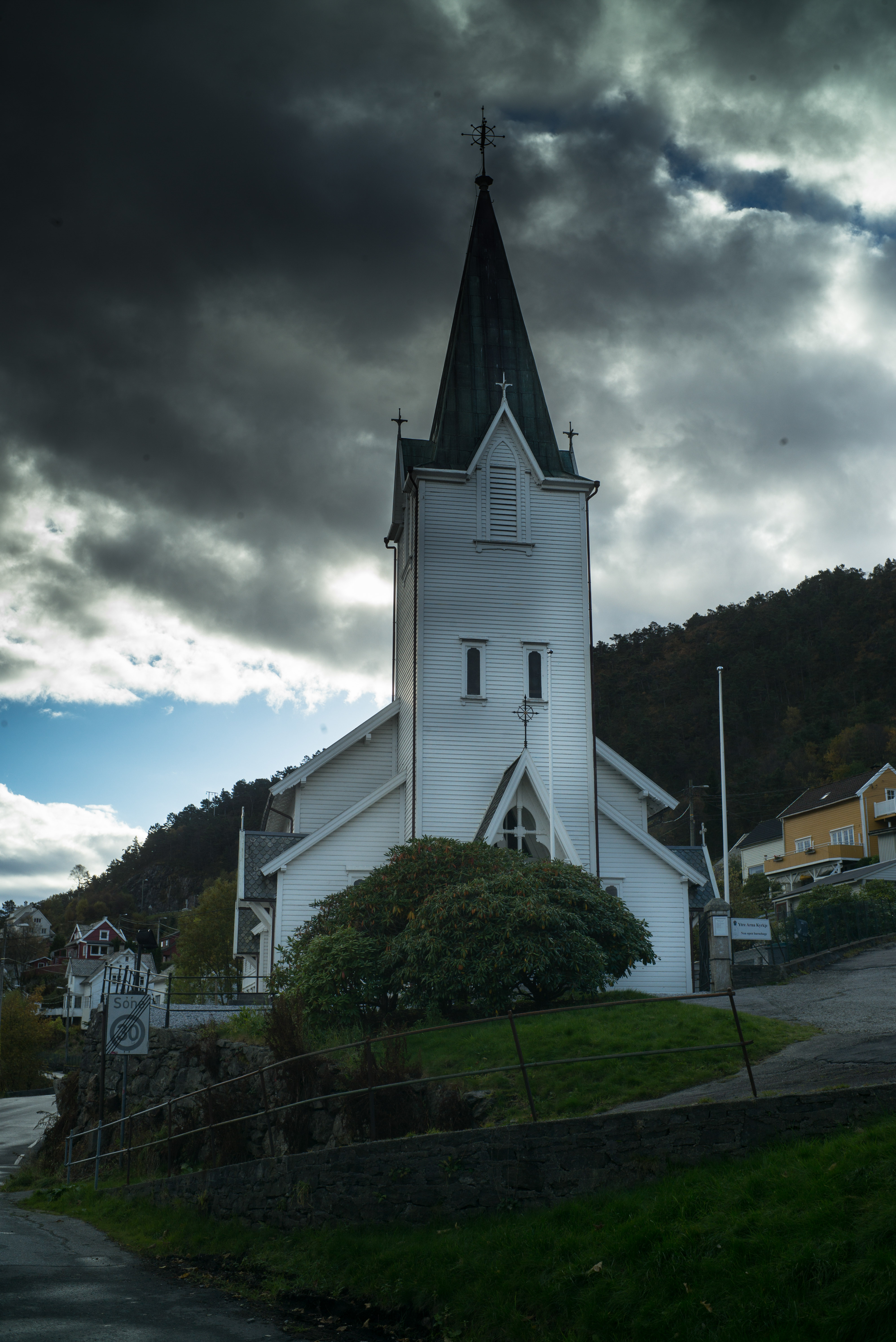
View of the church

== History ==
The village of Ytre Arna had significant population growth starting in the middle of the 19th century when a factory was built in the village. Permission to build a church in Ytre Arna was granted by Royal Decree on 22 May 1897. The designs of the church were drawn by the architect Schak Bull, and the main builder was Peter Gabrielsen from Spjutøy in Lindaas Municipality. The construction of the church was funded by the owner of the local factory, Jürgen Jebsen. The new church was completed in 1899 and it was consecrated on 5 November 1899. In 1949, the interior underwent a significant renovation led by architect Ole Landmark.

== See also ==
- List of churches in Bjørgvin
