= Espeland =

- Neighborhood in Bergen
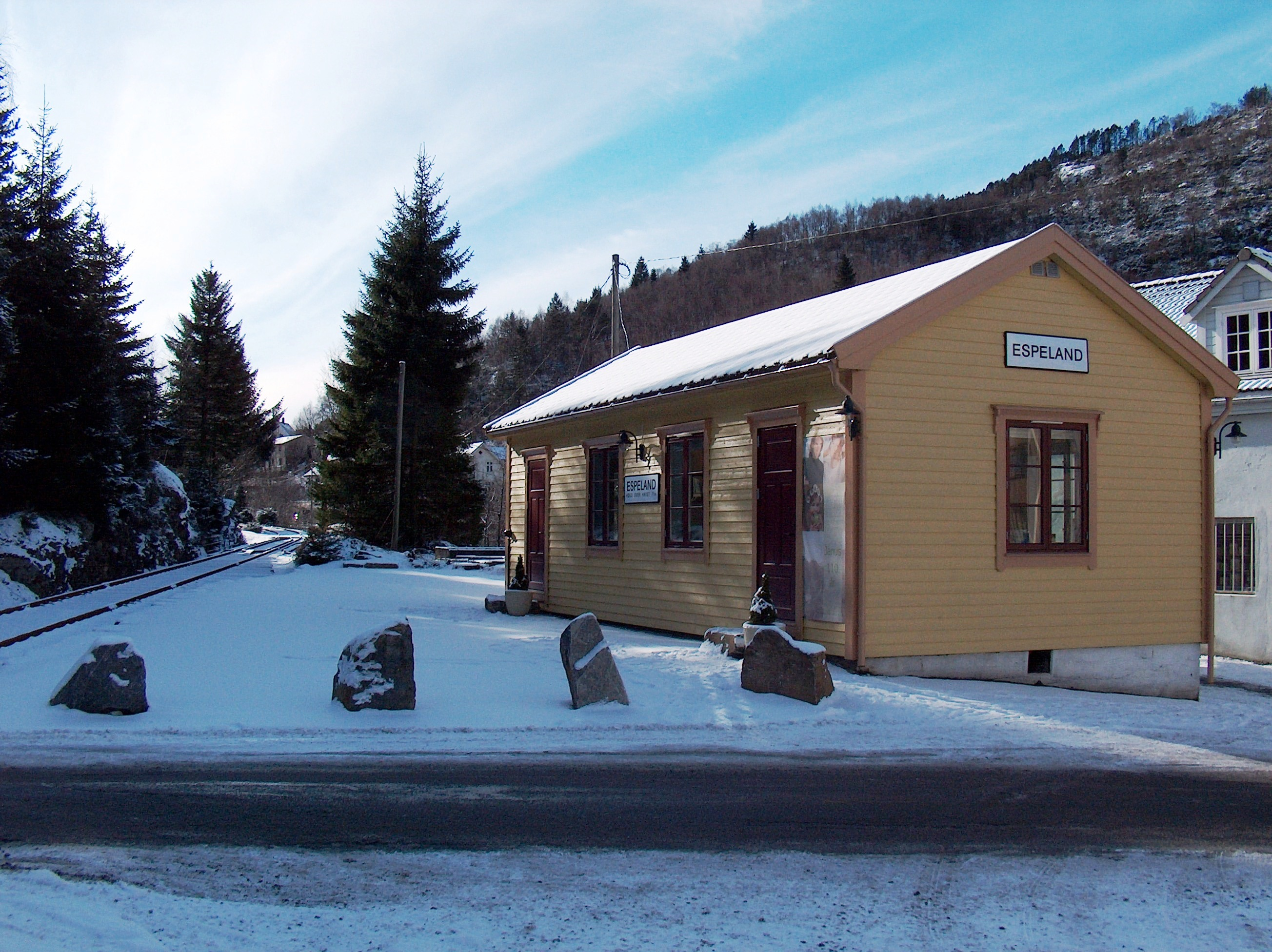
- View of the neighborhood Espeland train station on the Old Voss Line
- Interactive map of Espeland
- Coordinates: 60.3833°N 5.46667°E
- Country: Norway
- Region: Western Norway
- County: Vestland
- Municipality: Bergen
- Borough: Arna

Area
  - Total: 1.69 km^{2} (0.65 sq mi)
- Elevation: 85 m (279 ft)

Population (2025)
  - Total: 2,638
  - Density: 1,561/km^{2} (4,040/sq mi)
- Time zone: UTC+01:00 (CET)
  - Summer (DST): UTC+02:00 (CEST)

Espeland is a village in the borough of Arna in Bergen Municipality in Vestland county, Norway. Espeland is located north of Lake Haukeland (Norwegian: Haukelandsvatnet) and Mount Livarden. The village of Indre Arna lies about 4 kilometres (2.5 mi) to the north.

The 1.69-square-kilometre (420-acre) village has a population (2025) of 2,638 and a population density of 1,571 inhabitants per square kilometre (4,070/sq mi).

Espeland was the site of the Espeland concentration camp (Norwegian: Espeland fangeleir) built under the direction of German occupation forces between 1942 and 1943.
