= Åsane Municipality =

Former municipality in Hordaland, Norway

Åsane Municipality Åsane kommune
- Former municipality
- Aasane herred (historic name); Aasene herred (historic name)
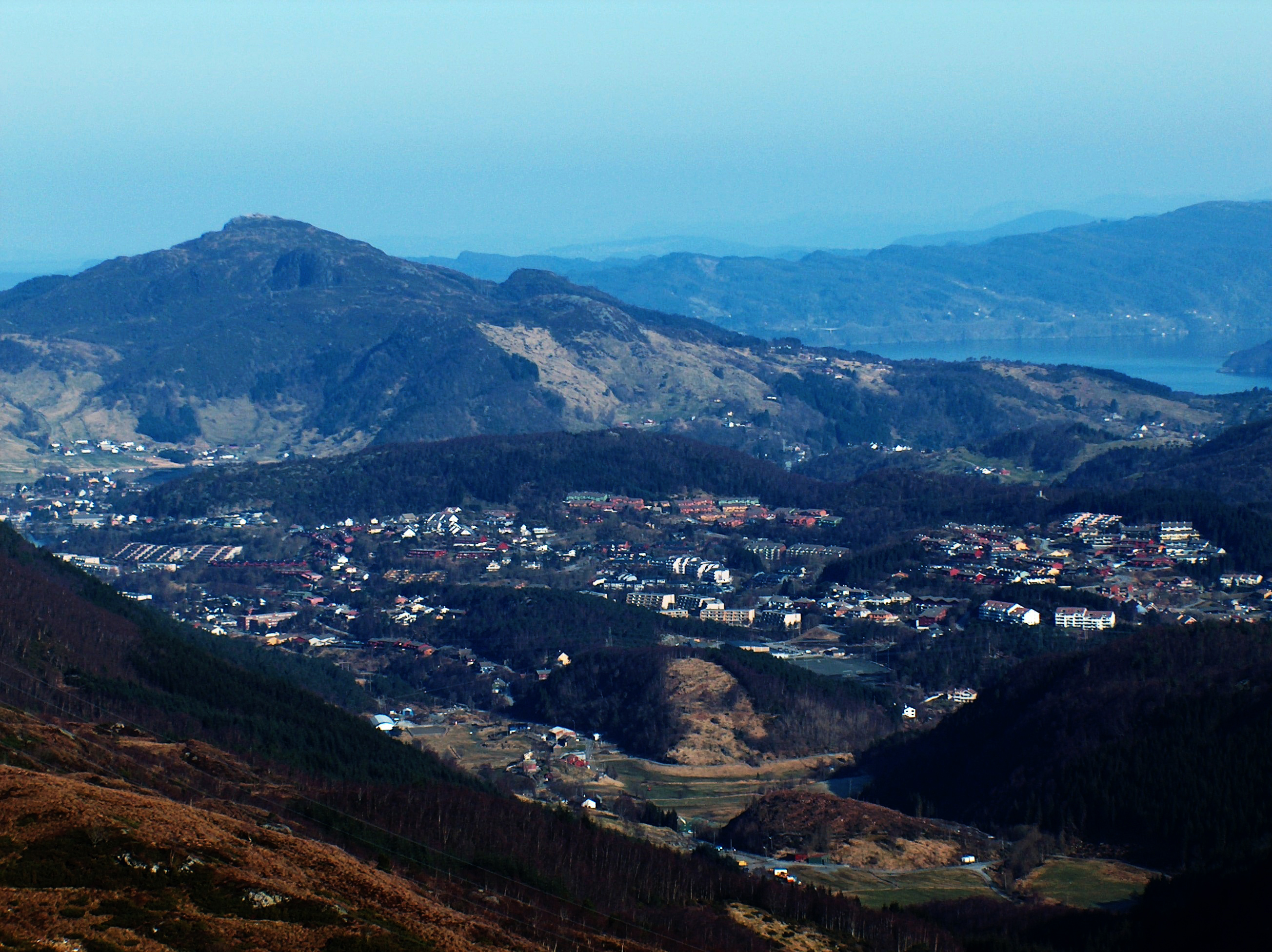
- Flaktveit in Åsane, seen from Vareggen.

- Hordaland within Norway

- Åsane within Hordaland
- Coordinates: 60°28′16″N 05°19′38″E
- Country: Norway
- County: Hordaland
- District: Midhordland
- Established: 1 Jan 1904
  - Preceded by: Hammer Municipality
- Disestablished: 1 Jan 1972
  - Succeeded by: Bergen Municipality
- Administrative centre: Eidsvåg

Government
  - Mayor (1966–1971): Henry Andreassen

Area (upon dissolution)
  - Total: 71.2 km^{2} (27.5 sq mi)
  - Rank: #404 in Norway
- Highest elevation: 642 m (2,106 ft)

Population (1971)
  - Total: 18,161
  - Rank: #35 in Norway
  - Density: 255.1/km^{2} (661/sq mi)
  - Change (10 years): ▲ +76.6%
- Demonym: Åsabu

Official language
  - Norwegian form: Nynorsk
- Time zone: UTC+01:00 (CET)
  - Summer (DST): UTC+02:00 (CEST)
- ISO 3166 code: NO-1255

Åsane is a former municipality in the old Hordaland county, Norway. The 71.2-square-kilometre (27.5 sq mi) municipality existed from 1904 until its dissolution in 1972. The area is now part of Bergen Municipality in the traditional district of Midhordland in Vestland county. The administrative centre was the village of Eidsvåg. The municipality encompassed the northern part of the Bergen Peninsula, roughly corresponding to the present-day borough of Åsane, north of the city centre of Bergen. The main church for the municipality was Åsane Church.

Prior to its dissolution in 1972, the 71.2-square-kilometre (27.5 sq mi) municipality was the 404th largest by area out of the 449 municipalities in Norway. Åsane Municipality was the 35th most populous municipality in Norway with a population of about 18,161. The municipality's population density was 255.1 inhabitants per square kilometre (661/sq mi) and its population had increased by 76.6% over the previous 10-year period.

== General information ==
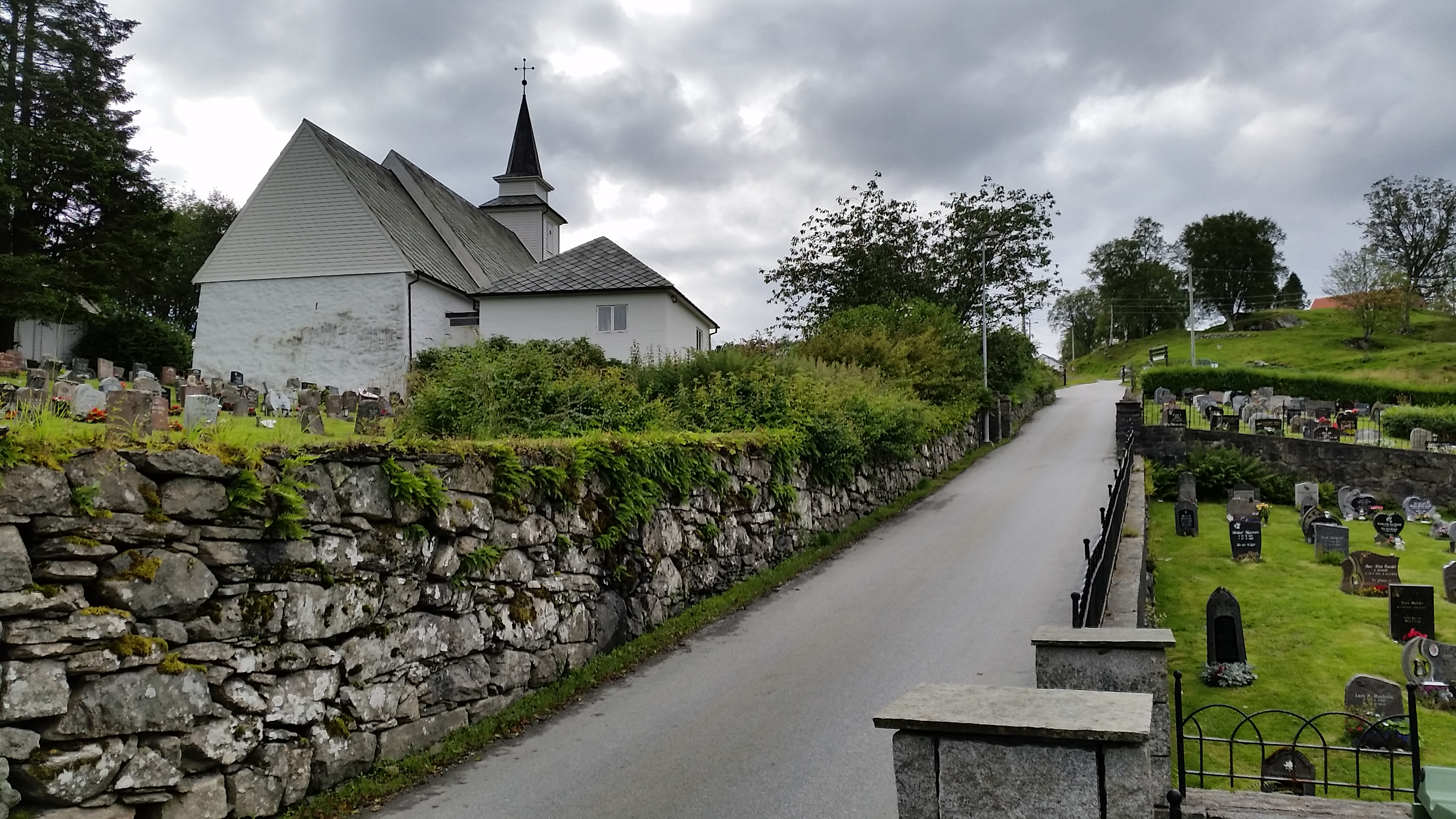
View of the Old Åsane Church

The large parish of Hammer existed for many centuries and within the parish existed the annex of Aasene. On 1 January 1904, the large Hammer Municipality was divided in two: the annex of Aasene on the Bergen Peninsula (population: 1,625) became the new Aasene Municipality (later spelled Åsane) and the rest (population: 2,914) remained as a smaller Hammer Municipality. The original Aasene Municipality included the northern part of the Bergen Peninsula, except for the coastal areas along the Salhusfjorden and Sørfjorden.

On 1 July 1914, most of the northern coastal part of the Bergen Peninsula (population: 644) was transferred from Hammer Municipality to Aasene Municipality (except for the far northern tip around Tellevik). On 1 July 1938, the far northern tip of the Bergen Peninsula around the villages of Tellevik and Hordvik were transferred from Hamre Municipality to Åsane Municipality.

On 1 January 1972, the city of Bergen was greatly expanded and the following areas were merged to for a new, much larger Bergen Municipality with over 200,000 residents:

- the city of Bergen (population: 111,925)
- all of Fana Municipality (population: 44,402)
- all of Laksevåg Municipality (population: 24,672)
- all of Åsane Municipality (population: 19,205)
- all of Arna Municipality (population: 11,766)

=== Name ===
The municipality (originally the parish) is named Aasene after an old name for the area (Old Norse: Ásar or Ásarnir). The name is the plural form of áss which means "rocky ridge" or "hill". Thus the name (since it was plural) means something like "the hills" or "the ridges". The whole area has been called Aasene for centuries. It likely gained that name since many of the local farms in that area had áss ("hill") in their names, thus the area was known as "the hills".

Historically, the name of the municipality was spelled Aasene. On 3 November 1917, a royal resolution changed the spelling of the name of the municipality to Aasane, using the Nynorsk spelling. On 21 December 1917, a royal resolution enacted the 1917 Norwegian language reforms. Prior to this change, the name was spelled Aasane with the digraph "Aa", and after this reform, the name was spelled Åsane, using the letter Å instead.

=== Churches ===
The Church of Norway had one parish (sokn) within Åsane Municipality. At the time of the municipal dissolution, it was part of the Åsane prestegjeld and the Bergen domprosti (arch-deanery) in the Diocese of Bjørgvin.

Churches in Åsane Municipality
| Parish (sokn) | Church name | Location of the church | Year built |
|---|---|---|---|
| Åsane | Åsane Church | Åsane | 1795 |
| Åsane | Biskopshavn Chapel | Biskopshavn | 1966 |
| Åsane | Salhus Chapel | Salhus | 1924 |

== Geography ==
The municipality was located in the northern part of the Bergen Peninsula. It was surrounded by the Byfjorden, Salhusfjorden, and Sørfjorden. The highest point in the municipality was the 642-metre (2,106 ft) tall mountain Grønetua, located on the border with Arna Municipality.

Lindås Municipality was located to the north, Osterøy Municipality was located to the east, Arna Municipality was located to the southeast, Bergen Municipality was located to the southwest, Askøy Municipality was located to the west, and Meland Municipality was located to the northwest.

== Government ==
While it existed, Åsane Municipality was responsible for primary education (through 10th grade), outpatient health services, senior citizen services, welfare and other social services, zoning, economic development, and municipal roads and utilities. The municipality was governed by a municipal council of directly elected representatives. The mayor was indirectly elected by a vote of the municipal council. The municipality was under the jurisdiction of the Gulating Court of Appeal.

=== Municipal council ===
The municipal council (Kommunestyre) of Åsane Municipality was made up of 41 representatives that were elected to four year terms. The tables below show the historical composition of the council by political party.

Åsane kommunestyre 1967–1971
| Party name (in Nynorsk) | Number of representatives |
|---|---|
| Labour Party (Arbeidarpartiet) | 16 |
| Conservative Party (Høgre) | 9 |
| Christian Democratic Party (Kristeleg Folkeparti) | 4 |
| Centre Party (Senterpartiet) | 1 |
| Socialist People's Party (Sosialistisk Folkeparti) | 2 |
| Liberal Party (Venstre) | 9 |
| Total number of members: | 41 |
Note: On 1 January 1972, Åsane Municipality became part of Bergen Municipality.

Åsane kommunestyre 1963–1967
| Party name (in Nynorsk) | Number of representatives |
|---|---|
| Labour Party (Arbeidarpartiet) | 17 |
| Conservative Party (Høgre) | 10 |
| Christian Democratic Party (Kristeleg Folkeparti) | 5 |
| Centre Party (Senterpartiet) | 2 |
| Socialist People's Party (Sosialistisk Folkeparti) | 1 |
| Liberal Party (Venstre) | 8 |
| Total number of members: | 43 |

Åsane heradsstyre 1959–1963
| Party name (in Nynorsk) | Number of representatives |
|---|---|
| Labour Party (Arbeidarpartiet) | 12 |
| Conservative Party (Høgre) | 6 |
| Christian Democratic Party (Kristeleg Folkeparti) | 5 |
| Liberal Party (Venstre) | 6 |
| Total number of members: | 29 |

Åsane heradsstyre 1955–1959
| Party name (in Nynorsk) | Number of representatives |
|---|---|
| Labour Party (Arbeidarpartiet) | 13 |
| Conservative Party (Høgre) | 4 |
| Christian Democratic Party (Kristeleg Folkeparti) | 1 |
| Farmers' Party (Bondepartiet) | 5 |
| Liberal Party (Venstre) | 6 |
| Total number of members: | 29 |

Åsane heradsstyre 1951–1955
| Party name (in Nynorsk) | Number of representatives |
|---|---|
| Labour Party (Arbeidarpartiet) | 8 |
| Conservative Party (Høgre) | 3 |
| Farmers' Party (Bondepartiet) | 4 |
| Liberal Party (Venstre) | 5 |
| Total number of members: | 20 |

Åsane heradsstyre 1947–1951
| Party name (in Nynorsk) | Number of representatives |
|---|---|
| Labour Party (Arbeidarpartiet) | 7 |
| Conservative Party (Høgre) | 3 |
| Farmers' Party (Bondepartiet) | 4 |
| Liberal Party (Venstre) | 6 |
| Total number of members: | 20 |

Åsane heradsstyre 1945–1947
| Party name (in Nynorsk) | Number of representatives |
|---|---|
| Labour Party (Arbeidarpartiet) | 8 |
| Communist Party (Kommunistiske Parti) | 1 |
| Christian Democratic Party (Kristeleg Folkeparti) | 4 |
| Joint List(s) of Non-Socialist Parties (Borgarlege Felleslister) | 7 |
| Total number of members: | 20 |

Åsane heradsstyre 1937–1941*
| Party name (in Nynorsk) | Number of representatives |
|---|---|
| Local List(s) (Lokale lister) | 16 |
| Total number of members: | 16 |
Note: Due to the German occupation of Norway during World War II, no elections were held for new municipal councils until after the war ended in 1945.

=== Mayors ===
The mayor (Nynorsk: ordførar) of Åsane Municipality was the political leader of the municipality and the chairperson of the municipal council. The following people have held this position:

- 1904–1911: Vemund J. Tertnes
- 1911–1913: Konrad Meyer
- 1914–1919: Vemund J. Tertnes
- 1919–1925: Adolf Andersen
- 1925–1925: Johan Birkeland
- 1926–1928: Olav Sellevold (V)
- 1929–1931: Nils Koltveit (V)
- 1932–1935: Olav Sellevold (V)
- 1936–1938: Anton Olsen
- 1939–1941: Olav Sellevold (V)
- 1945–1945: Olav Sellevold (V)
- 1946–1954: Olav Hordvik (V)
- 1954–1955: Steffen J. Toppe (Ap)
- 1956–1959: P. Leif Rutle
- 1960–1965: Kjeld Langeland (H)
- 1966–1971: Henry Andreassen

== See also ==
- List of former municipalities of Norway
