= Trengereid =

Village in Bergen Municipality, Norway

- Village
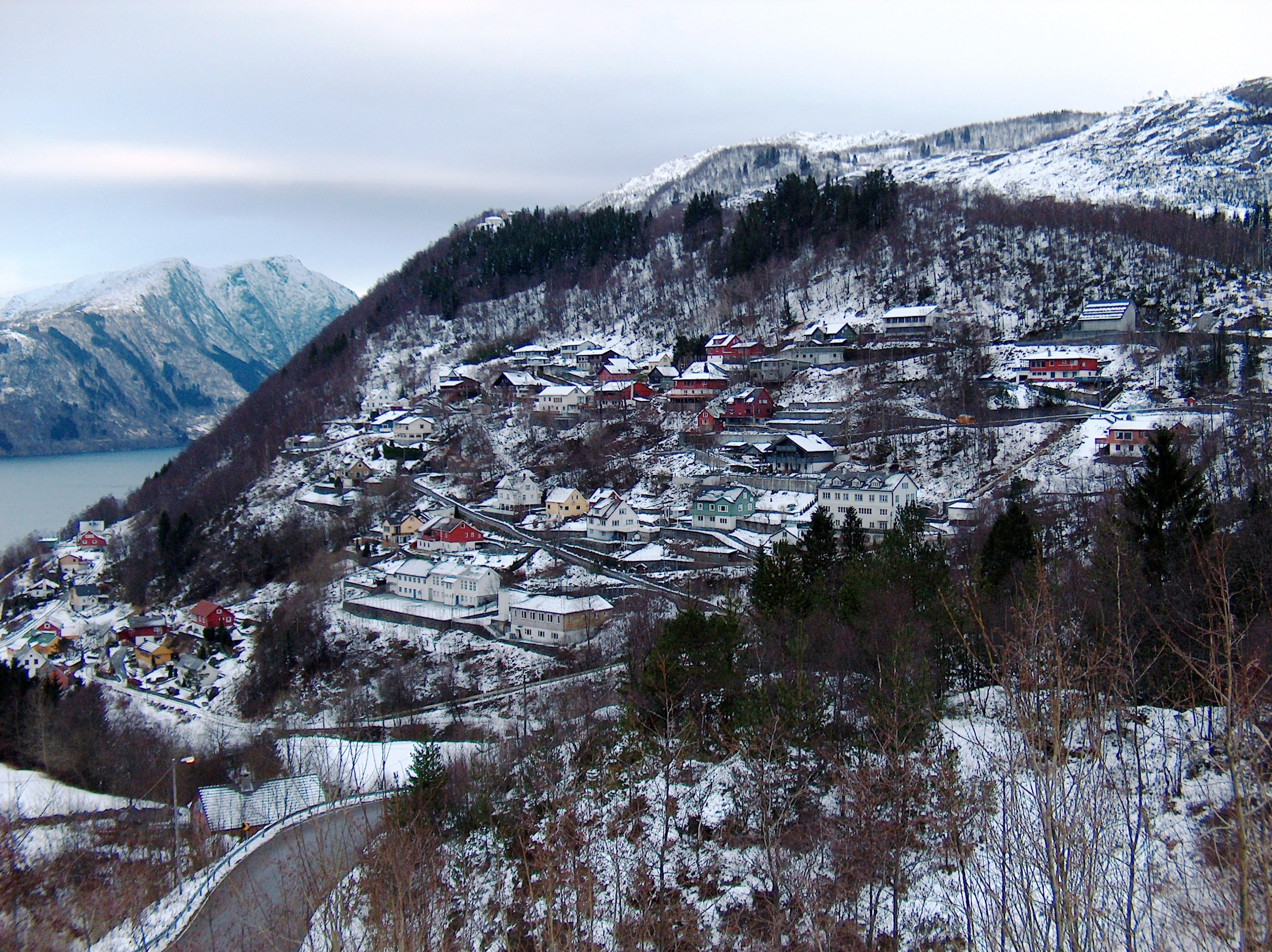
- View of Trengereid
- Interactive map of Trengereid
- Coordinates: 60.42766°N 5.62339°E
- Country: Norway
- Region: Western Norway
- County: Vestland
- District: Midhordland
- Municipality: Bergen Municipality
- Borough: Arna
- Elevation: 63 m (207 ft)
- Time zone: UTC+01:00 (CET)
  - Summer (DST): UTC+02:00 (CEST)
- Post Code: 5263 Trengereid

Trengereid is a village in the borough of Arna in Bergen Municipality in Hordaland county, Norway.

== History ==
In 1895, Johan Jebsen established a factory in Trengereid. The factory produced ribbons and lace, and it had its own power plant. Today the Trengereid power plant has been modernized and is operated by BKK. Previously there was also mining at nearby Risnes, where lime was extracted.

== Infrastructure ==
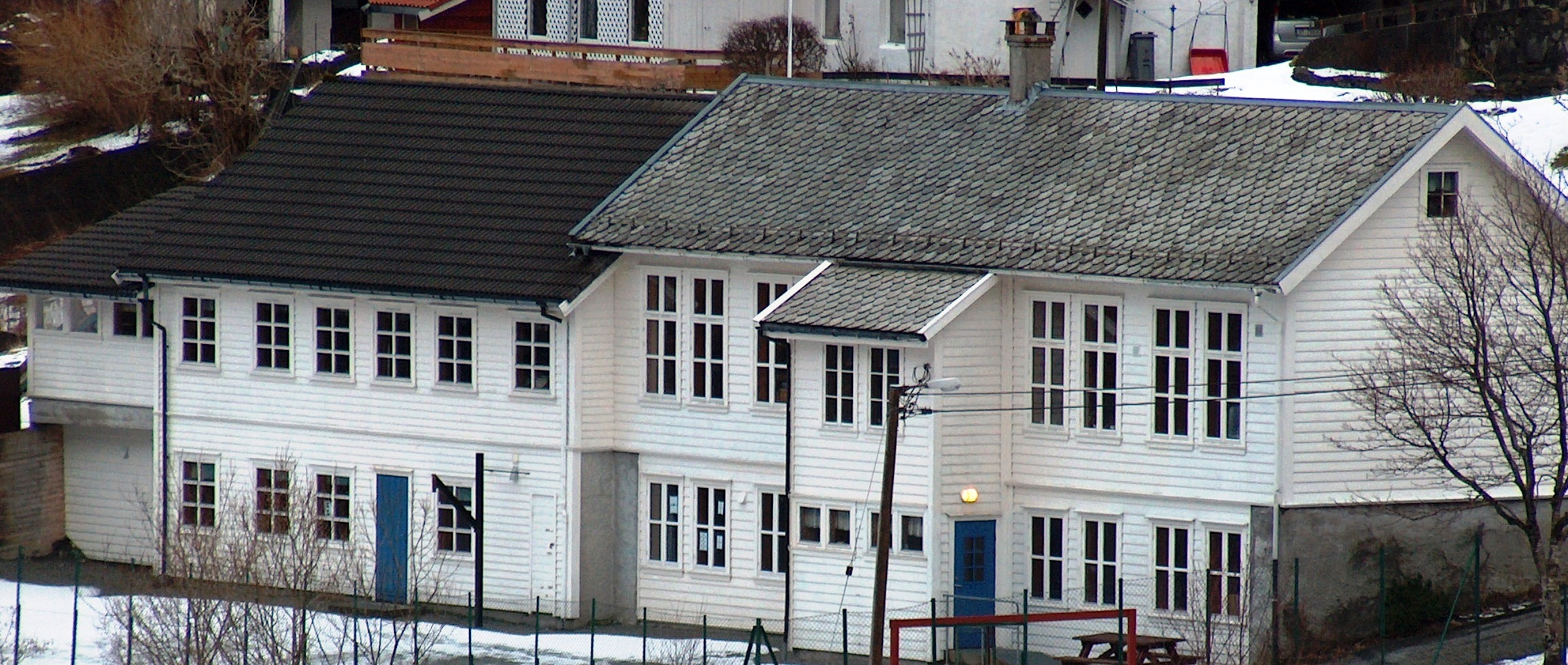
Trengereid School

Above Trengereid there is a roundabout that routes traffic between Norwegian County Road 7 to Hardanger and European route E16 eastwards to Voss Municipality and westward to Bergen's city center, or via a bypass road down to Trengereid.

Trengereid Station on the Bergen Line between Bergen and Myrdal via Voss stands below the village.

Neighborhoods and villages in Bergen Municipality
