= Arna, Bergen =

Borough of Bergen, Norway

Arna bydel
- Borough
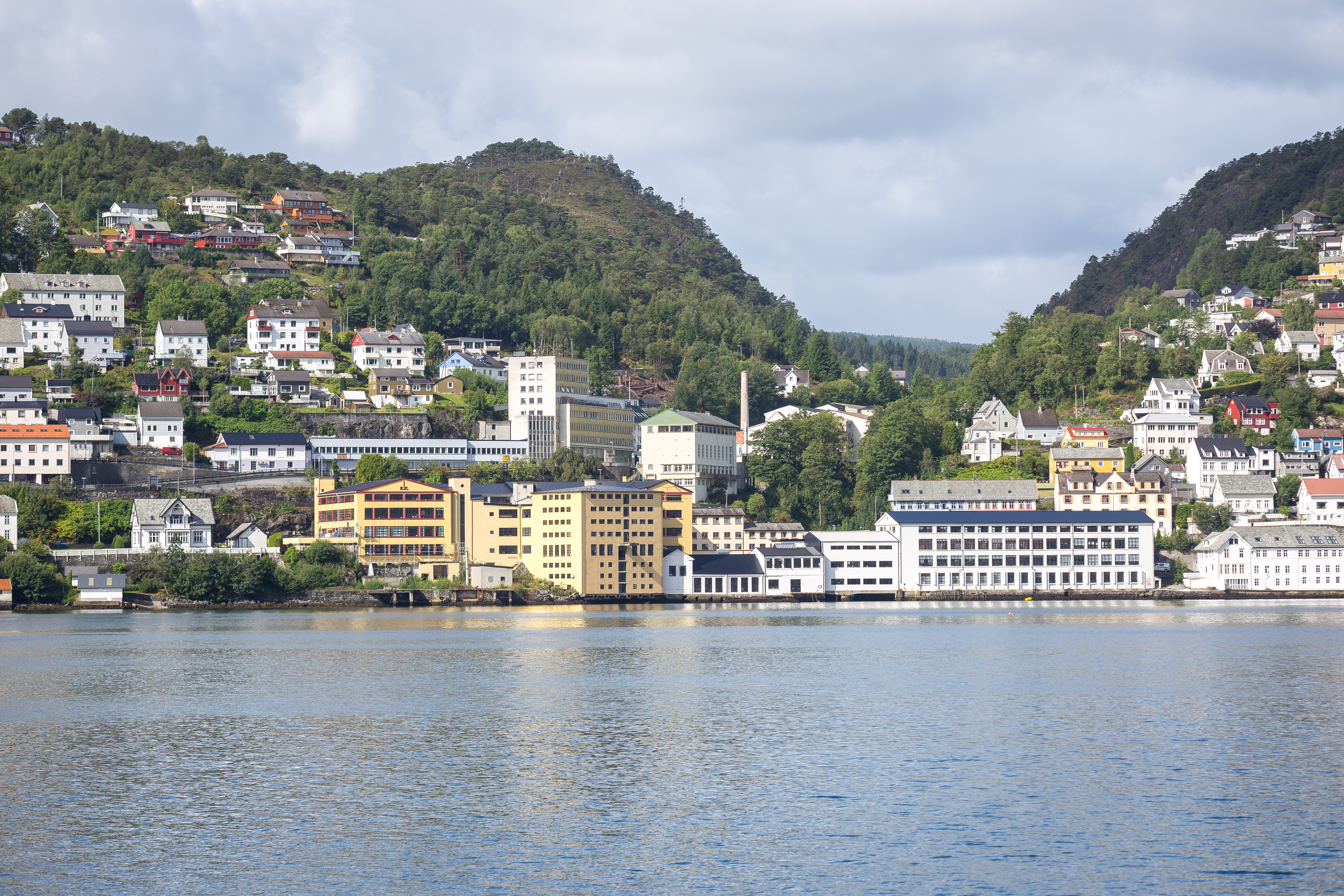

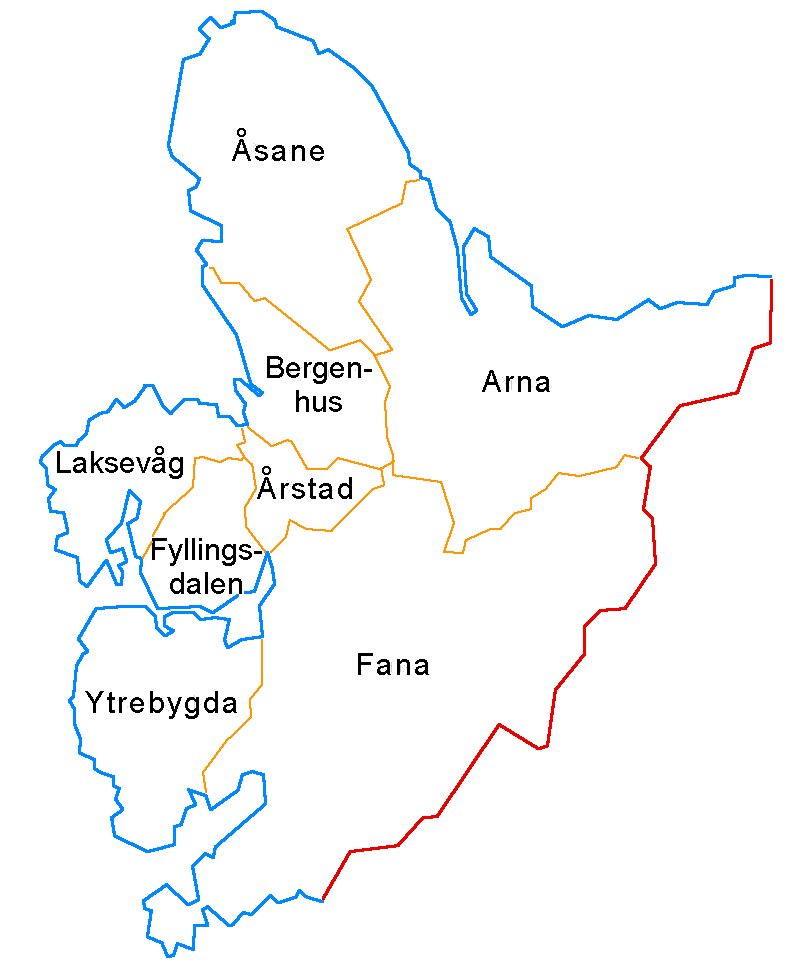
- Map of the 8 boroughs of Bergen
- Coordinates: 60°25′6″N 5°28′18″E
- Country: Norway
- Region: Western Norway
- County: Vestland
- District: Midhordland
- City: Bergen

Area
  - Total: 99.71 km^{2} (38.50 sq mi)
  - Rank: 2nd
- 22.4% of total

Population (2014)
  - Total: 13,458
  - Rank: 8th
  - Density: 135.0/km^{2} (349.6/sq mi)
- 4.9% of total
- Time zone: UTC+01:00 (CET)
  - Summer (DST): UTC+02:00 (CEST)
- ISO 3166 code: NO-120101

Arna is a borough in the city of Bergen in Vestland county, Norway. It is one of eight boroughs in Bergen. It encompasses the northeastern part of Bergen Municipality. The old Arna Municipality was merged into the city of Bergen in 1972 and since then it has been a borough within the city-municipality. The main population centres in the borough are the villages of Indre Arna, Ytre Arna, and Espeland.

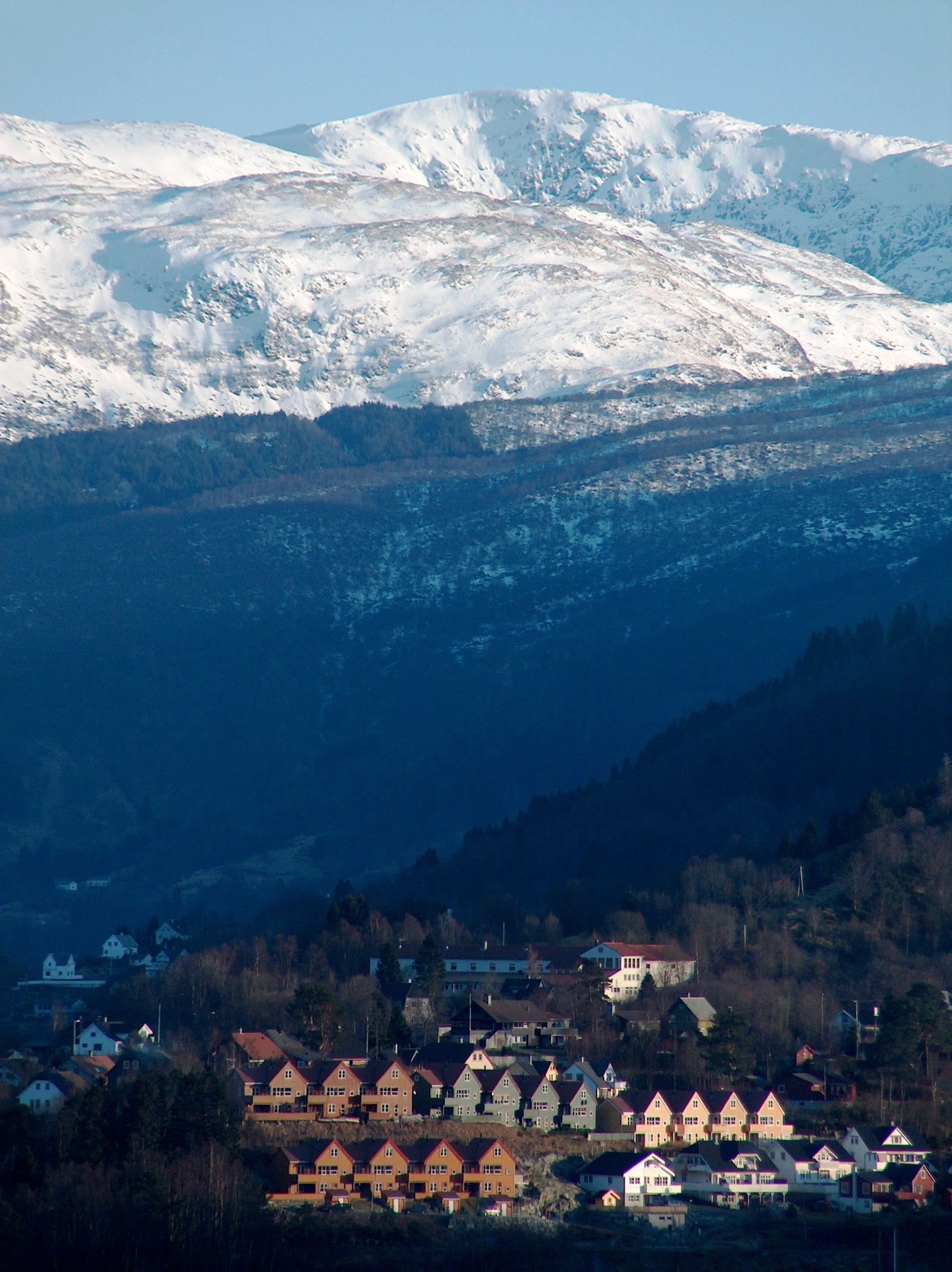
Gullfjellet (987 m), the highest mountain in Bergen, is located in Arna

== Location ==
The borough of Arna has approximately 13,000 inhabitants. It lies along the Sørfjorden, east of the centre of the city of Bergen (the borough of Bergenhus). The large mountains Ulriken and Rundemanen lie between the city centre and Arna. Arna is geographically close to central Bergen, but it takes some time to drive there by road as there is currently no road tunnel. However, a train journey from Arna Station to Bergen only takes eight minutes since there is a train tunnel (Ulriken Tunnel) through the mountain. Takvam Station and Trengereid Station are also located within the borough, a little east of the village of Indre Arna. The European route E16 highway runs through Arna, along the shoreline.

The borough of Arna consists of many smaller "village" areas, since this borough includes some of the most rural parts of the city of Bergen. The village areas include Haukeland, Unneland, Espeland, Rødland, Haugland, Gaupås, Ytre Arna, Indre Arna, Arnatveit, Garnes, Takvam, Songstad, and Trengereid.

== Name ==
The Old Norse forms of the name were Arni (nominative) and Arna (dative), and this was originally the old name of Arnavågen bay. The name is very old, and it is possibly related to the Italian name Arno. In the local dialect of this area, the name was traditionally pronounced Ådna. This form is still used for many other local place names such as Ådnamarka, Ådnavegen, Ådnatun, and Ådnanipa (Arnanipa).

== History ==
The parish of Haus was established as a municipality on 1 January 1838 (see formannskapsdistrikt law), including the annex Bruvik. On 1 January 1870, Bruvik (population: 2,062) was separated from Haus to form a municipality of its own. The split left Haus with a population of 4,229. On 1 January 1964, the part of Haus in Osterøy was transferred to the new Osterøy Municipality, whereas the remaining part on the mainland formed the new Arna Municipality. On 1 January 1972, the city of Bergen was expanded by merging the neighboring municipalities of Arna, Bergen, Fana, Laksevåg, and Åsane into one large urban municipality. At the time of the merger, Arna had a population of 11,766.

== Attractions ==
Arna has a number of natural attractions. There are several beaches along the Sørfjorden. The Arnaelva river is Bergen's only salmon-fishing river. The mountains Ådnanipa and Gullfjellet are both accessible to hikers. The Kråmyrane nature reserve and Reppadalen nature reserve are both located in Arna. There are also two museums in Arna. The Ådnatun Museum and the Old Voss Line railway museum are both located near Indre Arna.

== Education ==
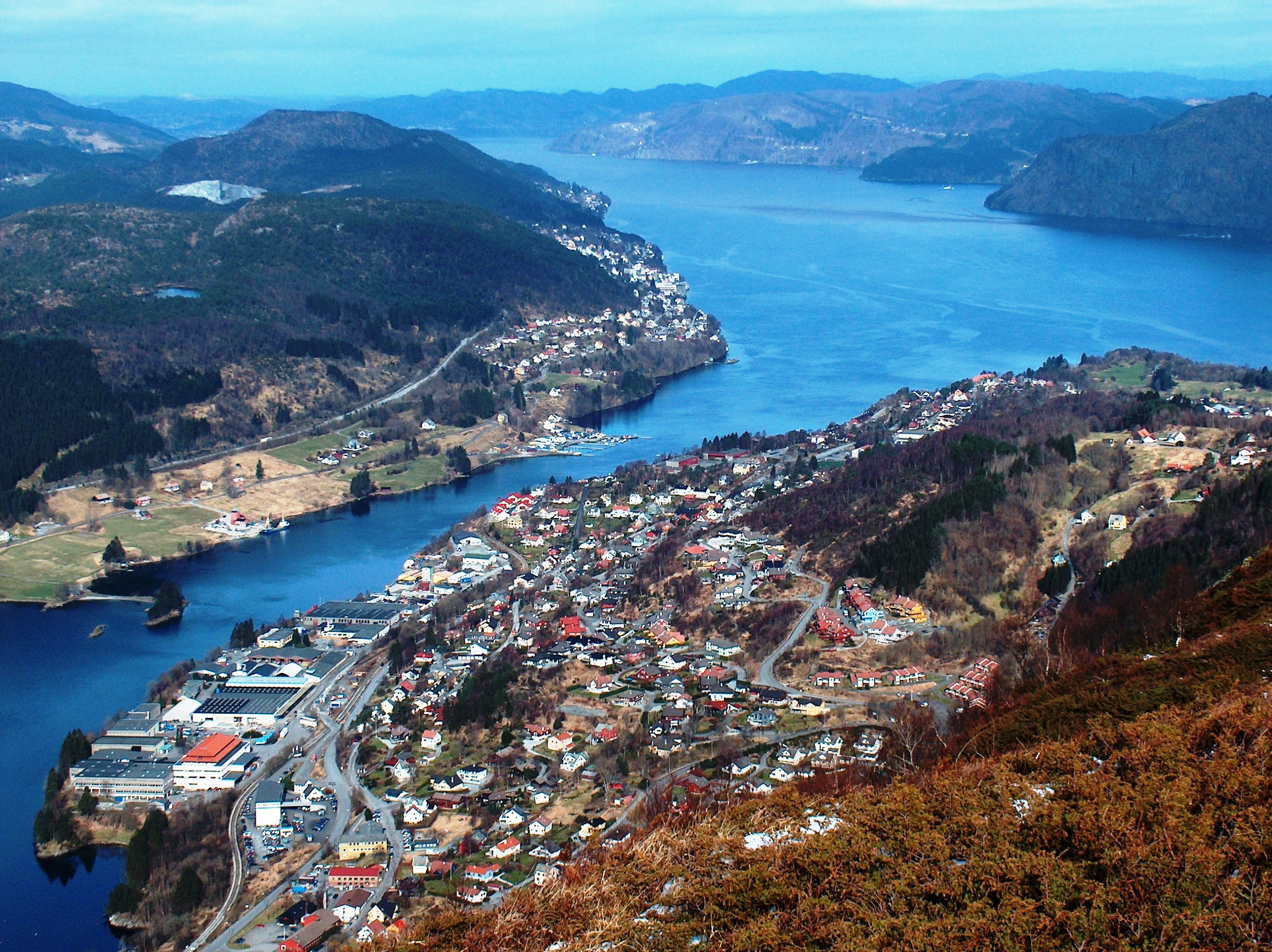
View of the Arnavågen bay

Arna has a number of educational facilities.

- Garnes barneskule, a primary school at Garnes
- Haugland school, a primary school at Haugland
- Lone school, a primary school at Haukeland
- Ytre Arna school, a primary and lower secondary school in Ytre Arna
- Ådnamarka school, a primary school at Arnatveit
- Garnes Lower Secondary School at Garnes
- Arna Upper Secondary School at Indre Arna
- Garnes Upper Secondary School at Garnes
