= Arna Church =

Church in Vestland, Norway

- Arna kirke
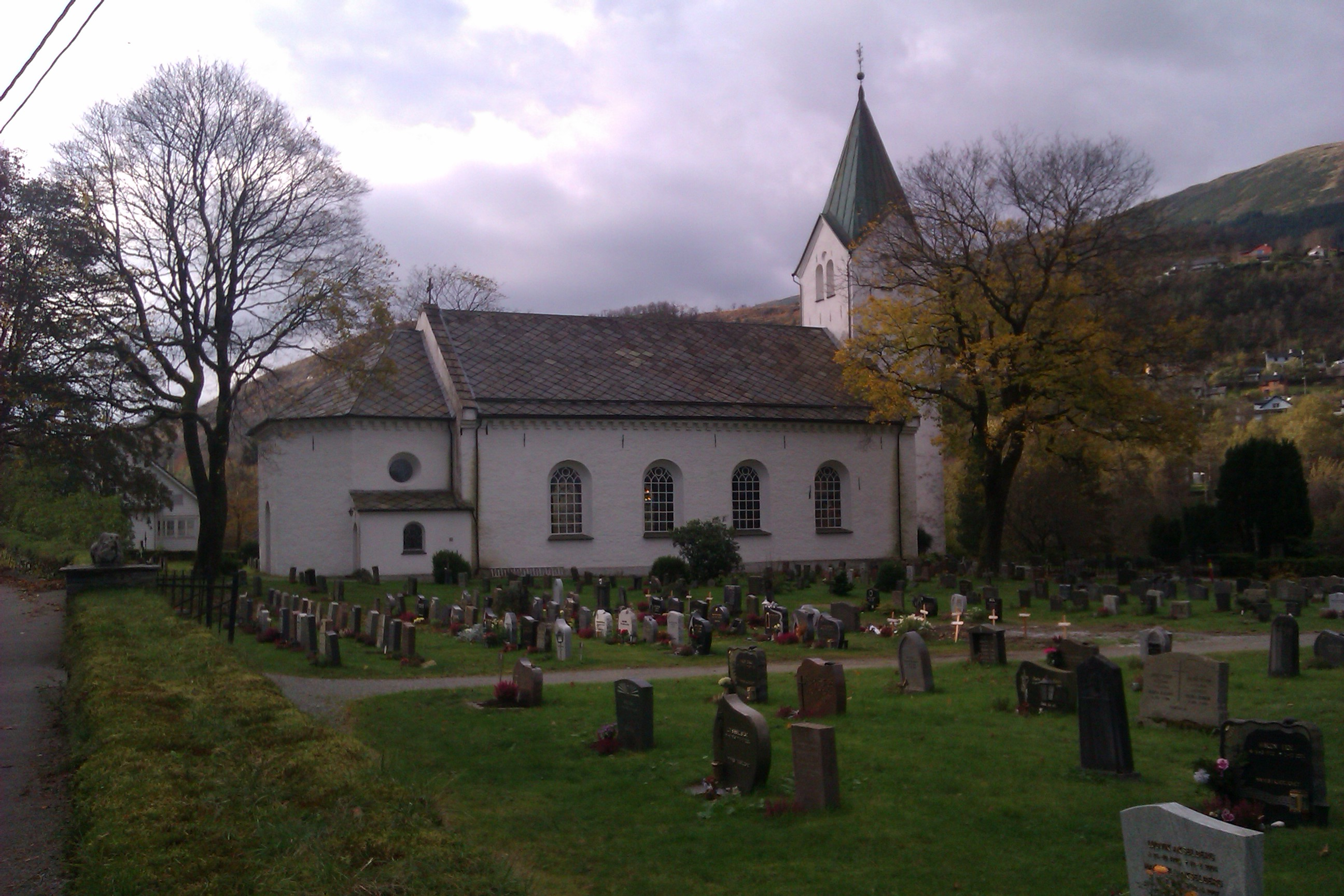
- View of the church
- Arna Church
- 60°25′09″N 5°28′04″E
- Location: Bergen Municipality, Vestland
- Country: Norway
- Denomination: Church of Norway
- Churchmanship: Evangelical Lutheran

History
- Status: Parish church
- Founded: 1864
- Consecrated: 1864

Architecture
- Functional status: Active
- Architect: F.H. Stockfleth
- Architectural type: Long church
- Completed: 1864 (162 years ago)

Specifications
- Capacity: 280
- Materials: Stone

Administration
- Diocese: Bjørgvin bispedømme
- Deanery: Åsane prosti
- Parish: Arna
- Norwegian Cultural Heritage Site
- Type: Church
- Status: Listed
- ID: 83791

Arna Church (Norwegian: Arna kirke) is a parish church of the Church of Norway in Bergen Municipality in Vestland county, Norway. It is located in the village of Indre Arna. It is one of two churches in the Arna parish which is part of the Åsane prosti (deanery) in the Diocese of Bjørgvin. The white, stone church was built in a long church design in 1864 using plans drawn up by the architect Frederik Hannibal Stockfleth. The church seats about 280 people.

== History ==
In 1861, a cemetery was built in Arna, and soon after, planning began for a church at the cemetery. Frederik Hannibal Stockfleth was hired to design the new church and a man named Wangberg was hired as the lead builder. The church was completed in 1864, a date that is prominently displayed on the side of the church, and it was consecrated in 1865. The church received its first organ in 1912. In 1928, the church interior was refurbished and repainted. In 1936, a sacristy was built on the north and south sides of the choir using designs by the architect Erlend Tryti. The church was again renovated from 1964 to 1965 for the church's centennial celebrations, using plans by the architect R. Brandvik.

== Media gallery ==
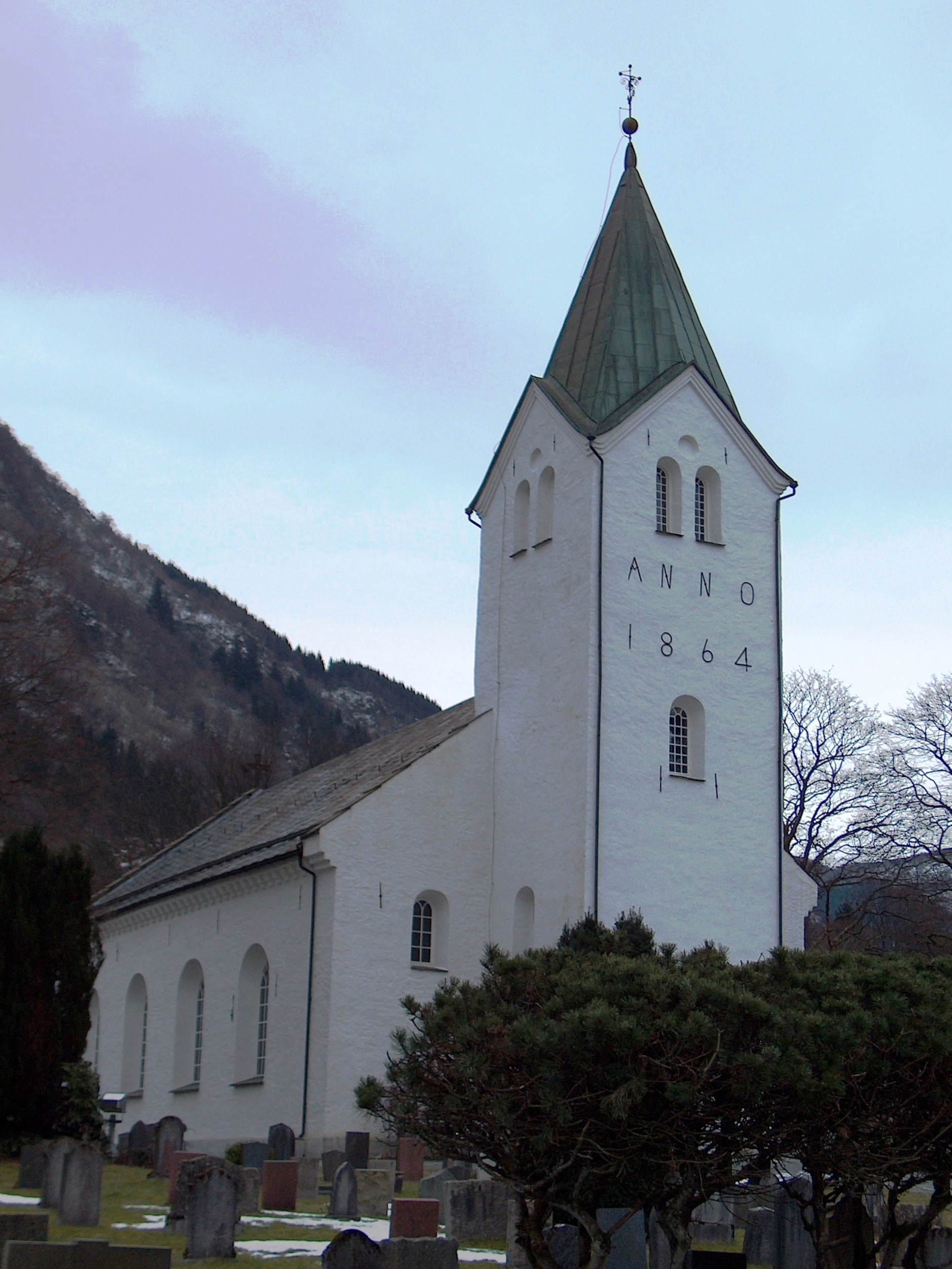
Exterior view of the church

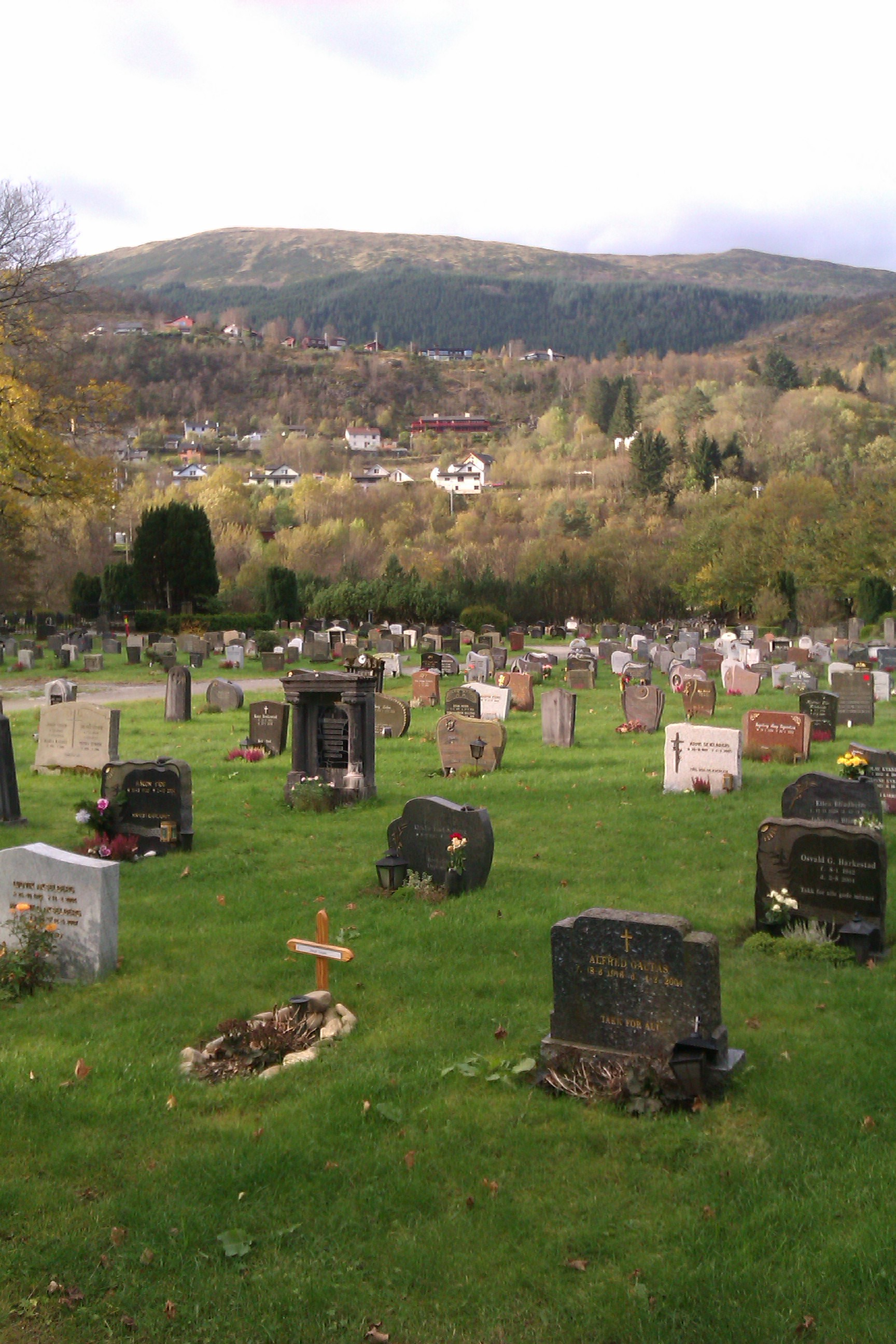
The graveyard surrounding the church

== See also ==
- List of churches in Bjørgvin
