= Indre Arna =

- Neighborhood in Bergen
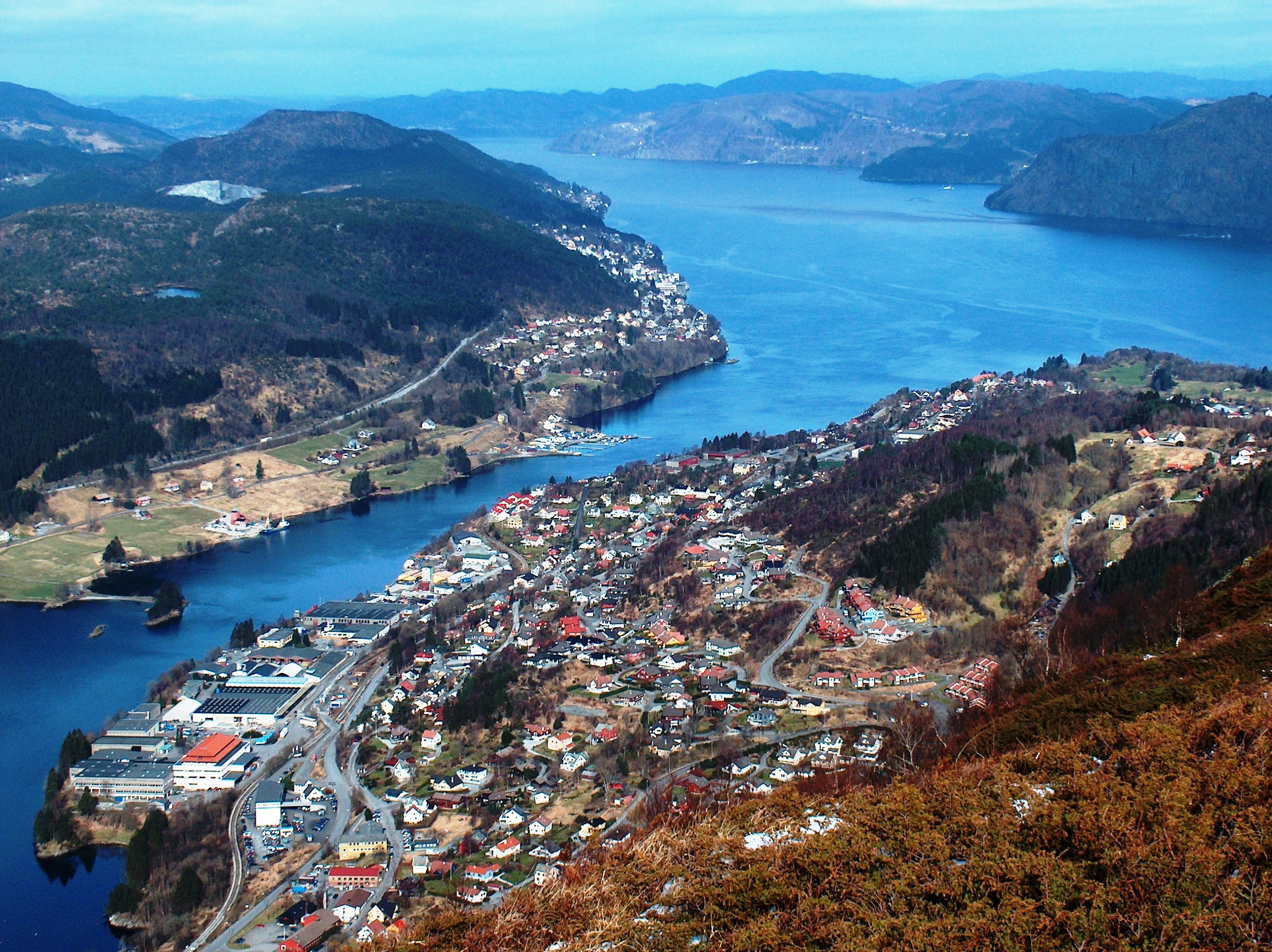
- View of the neighborhood with Ådnanipa in Indre Arna in the foreground
- Interactive map of Indre Arna
- Coordinates: 60.4177°N 5.4709°E
- Country: Norway
- Region: Western Norway
- County: Vestland
- Municipality: Bergen
- Borough: Arna

Area
  - Total: 3.96 km^{2} (1.53 sq mi)
- Elevation: 38 m (125 ft)

Population (2012)
  - Total: 6,536
  - Density: 1,651/km^{2} (4,280/sq mi)
- Time zone: UTC+01:00 (CET)
  - Summer (DST): UTC+02:00 (CEST)

Indre Arna is a suburban village in the borough of Arna in Bergen Municipality in Vestland county, Norway. While Indre Arna is relatively far from most of the city centre of Bergen by road, there is an 8-minute train journey through the mountain Ulriken from Indre Arna to the city centre. Arna Church and Arna Station are both located in the village.

The 3.96-square-kilometre (980-acre) village has a population (2012) of 6,536 and a population density of 1,651 inhabitants per square kilometre (4,280/sq mi). Since 2013, Statistics Norway no longer tracked separate population statistics for Indre Arna, instead the village was incorporated into a larger urban area called Arna which includes the greater Indre Arna and Ytre Arna areas.
