= Ytre Arna =

- Neighborhood in Bergen
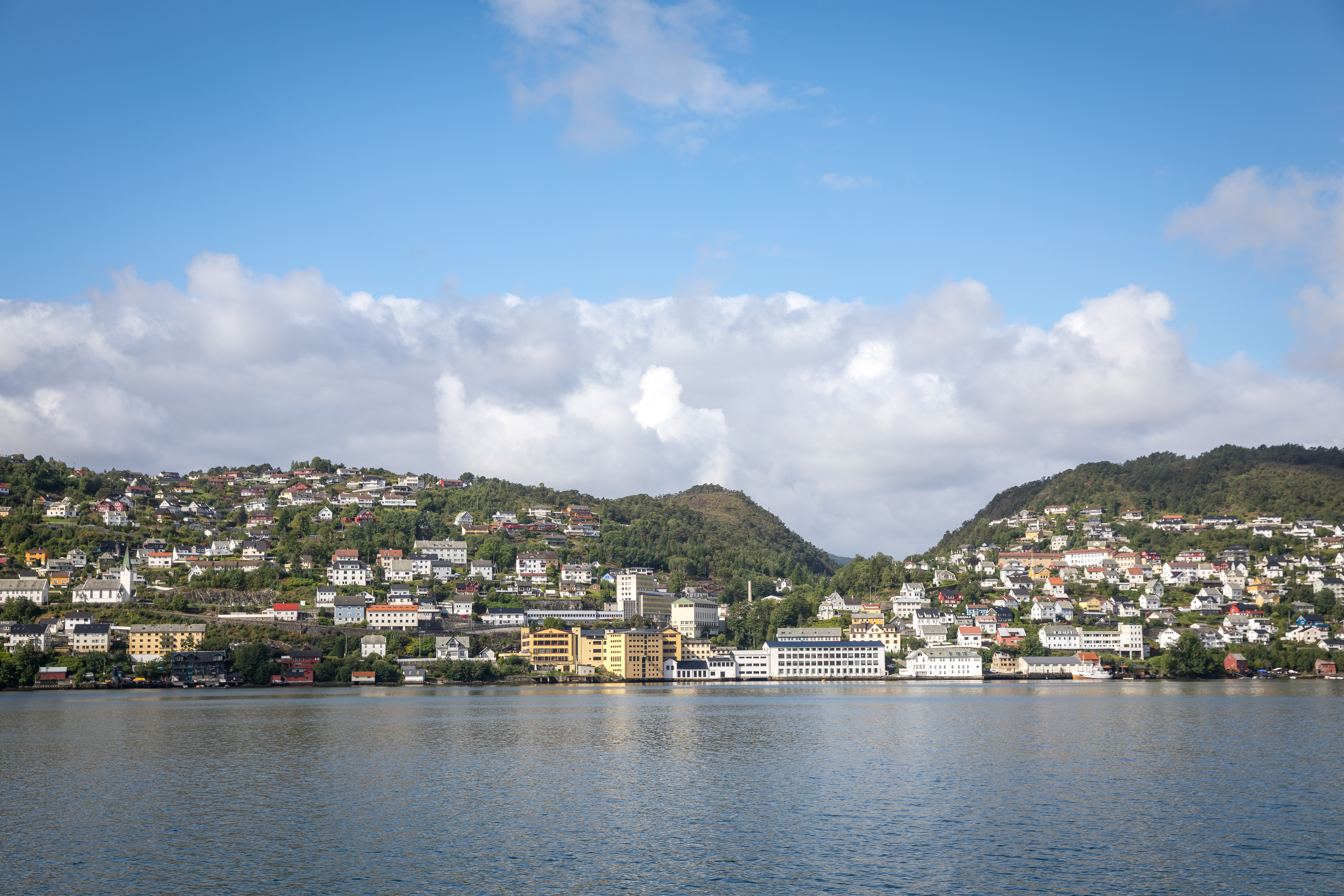
- View of Ytre Arna
- Interactive map of Ytre Arna
- Coordinates: 60.4587°N 5.4391°E
- Country: Norway
- Region: Western Norway
- County: Vestland
- Municipality: Bergen Municipality
- Borough: Arna

Area
  - Total: 1.55 km^{2} (0.60 sq mi)
- Elevation: 38 m (125 ft)

Population (2012)
  - Total: 2,626
  - Density: 1,694/km^{2} (4,390/sq mi)
- Time zone: UTC+01:00 (CET)
  - Summer (DST): UTC+02:00 (CEST)

Ytre Arna is a village area in the borough of Arna in Bergen Municipality in Vestland county, Norway. Ytre Arna is principally associated with A/S Arne Fabrikker, the country's first mechanised cotton mill. Ytre Arna Church (Ytre Arna kirke) is also located in the village.

The 1.55-square-kilometre (380-acre) village has a population (2012) of 2,626 and a population density of 1,694 inhabitants per square kilometre (4,390/sq mi). Since 2013, Statistics Norway no longer tracked separate population statistics for Ytre Arna, instead the village was incorporated into a larger urban area called Arna that includes the greater Indre Arna and Ytre Arna areas.
