= Finsevatnet =

Lake in Norway

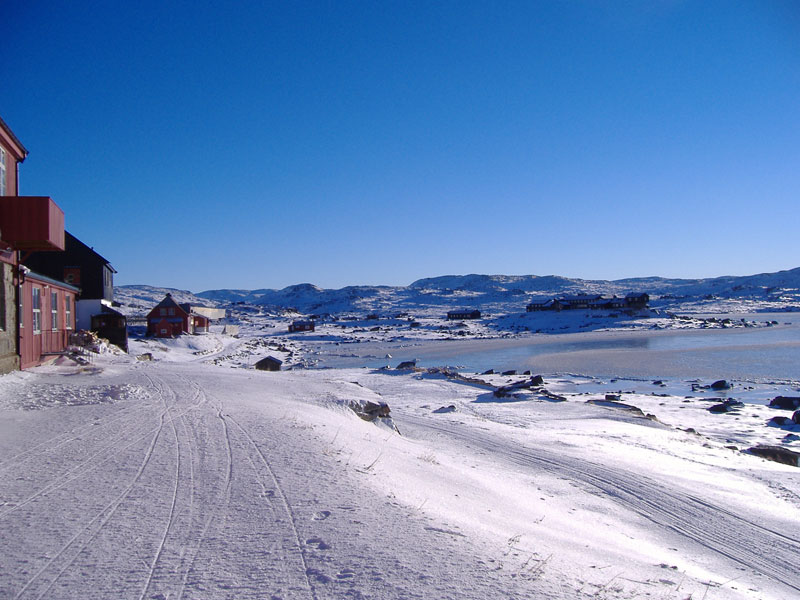
- View of the lake (right side of picture)
- Interactive map of Finsevatnet
- Location: Ulvik Municipality, Vestland
- Coordinates: 60.59588°N 7.50991°E
- Basin countries: Norway
- Max. length: 4 kilometres (2.5 mi)
- Max. width: 1.2 kilometres (0.75 mi)
- Surface area: 3.14 km^{2} (1.21 sq mi)
- Shore length^{1}: 11.71 kilometres (7.28 mi)
- Surface elevation: 1,214 metres (3,983 ft)
- Settlements: Finse
- References: NVE
- ^{1} Shore length is not a well-defined measure.

Finsevatnet is a lake in Ulvik Municipality in Vestland county, Norway. The 3.14-square-kilometre (1.21 sq mi) lake lies just south of the village of Finse where Finse Station on the Bergen Line is located. The Finse Tunnel is located just north of the lake. The southeast side of the lake has a dam which regulates the depth of the lake for the purposes of hydro-electric power generation.

== See also ==
- List of lakes in Norway
