= Togavatnet =

Lake in Vestland, Norway

- Tangavatnet
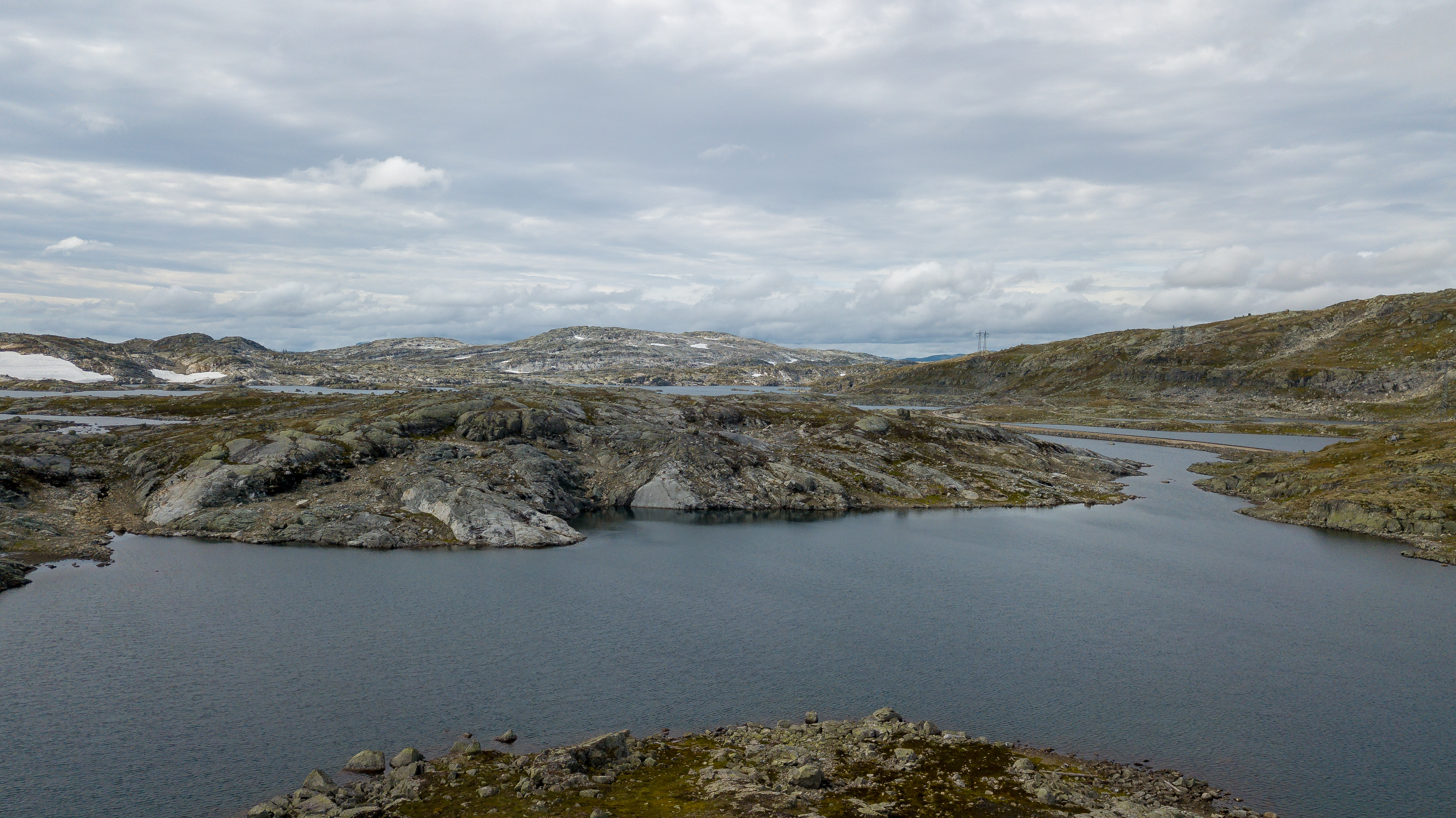
- View of the lake from the Rallarvegen
- Interactive map of Togavatnet
- Location: Ulvik Municipality, Vestland
- Coordinates: 60.62357°N 7.35507°E
- Primary outflows: Ustekveikja
- Basin countries: Norway
- Max. length: 1.5 kilometres (0.93 mi)
- Max. width: 1 kilometre (0.62 mi)
- Surface area: 1.57 km^{2} (0.61 sq mi)
- Surface elevation: 1,296 m (4,252 ft)
- References: NVE

Togavatnet is a lake in Ulvik Municipality in Vestland county, Norway. The lake lies on the south side of the Bergen Line railway as it crosses the Hardangervidda plateau. It sits at an elevation of 1,296 metres (4,252 ft) above sea level. The railway had its summit here, at 1,301.7 metres (4,271 ft) above sea level, until the Finse Tunnel was built which led to the closure of the route past the lake on 16 May 1993. After the tunnel opened, the highest point on the line became 1,237 metres (4,058 ft) above sea level, at kilometre 306.90 inside the tunnel.

The lake drains via the neighboring Fagervatnet lake (at the same elevation) and then into the Ustekveikja river, which feeds into the lake Ustevatn in Hol Municipality in Buskerud county to the east. The Rallarvegen road passes along the northern shore of the lake.

== Name ==
The official name of the lake according to the Norwegian Mapping Authority is Togavatnet. The spelling Tangavatnet is also approved, but it is not the prioritized name. There are a number of unofficial names that were rejected by the Mapping Authority: Tågavatni, Taugevatn, Tangavatn.

== See also ==
- List of lakes in Norway
