= Finse =

Village in Ulvik Municipality, Norway

- Hamlet
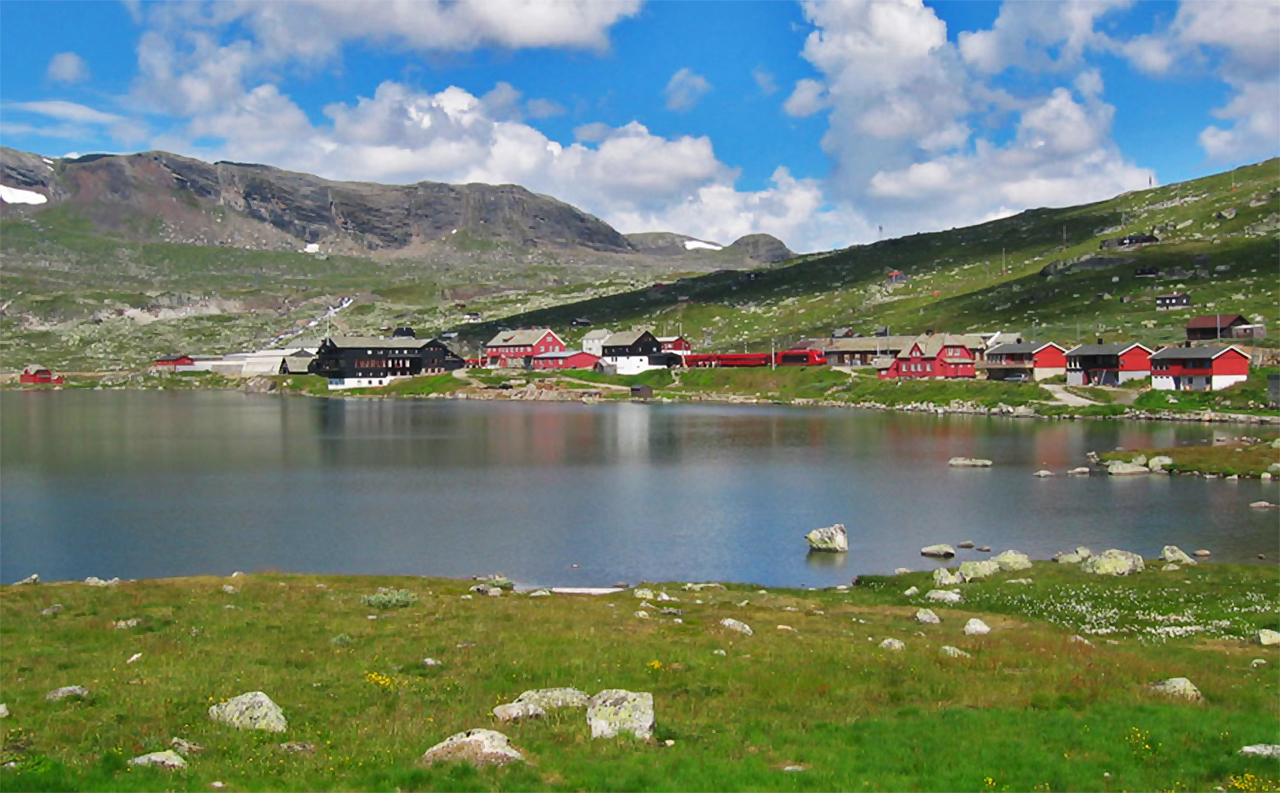
- View of Finse in summer
- Interactive map of Finse
- Coordinates: 60.60168°N 7.5041°E
- Country: Norway
- Region: Western Norway
- County: Vestland
- District: Hardanger
- Municipality: Ulvik Municipality
- Elevation: 1,216 m (3,990 ft)

Population
  - Total: 15
- (Population of basic statistical unit Finse-Hallingskeid)
- Time zone: UTC+01:00 (CET)
  - Summer (DST): UTC+02:00 (CEST)
- Post Code: 5719 Finse

Finse is a mountain hamlet in Ulvik Municipality in Vestland county, Norway. The small settlement is located along the lake Finsevatnet and it is centered around Finse station, a railway station on the Bergen Line. The station is the highest station of the Norwegian railway system at an elevation of 1,222 metres (4,009 ft) above sea level. As it is not reachable by road, and as the municipality is not otherwise connected by rail, Finse is not easily accessible from the rest of Ulvik Municipality (or from elsewhere in the Hardanger region). According to Statistics Norway, the basic statistical unit of Finse-Hallingskeid, which includes several other nearby localities such as Hallingskeid station, had a population of 15 in 2025.

In winter, Finse is a popular destination for cross-country skiing and other winter sports, while during summer it is a popular starting point for hiking and bicycling trips. Tourist facilities include a hotel (Finse 1222), a hostel (Finsehytta) operated by the Norwegian Mountain Touring Association (DNT), as well as a number of private cabins. Just west of Finse station, the railway passes through the Finse Tunnel, the longest tunnel on the Bergen Line. When opened, the tunnel replaced a section of rail that was frequently blocked by snow and difficult to clear, causing delays and cancellations on the railway. According to the BBC, explorers Roald Amundsen, Robert Falcon Scott and Ernest Shackleton all trained for their Antarctic and polar expeditions at Finse.

== Transportation ==
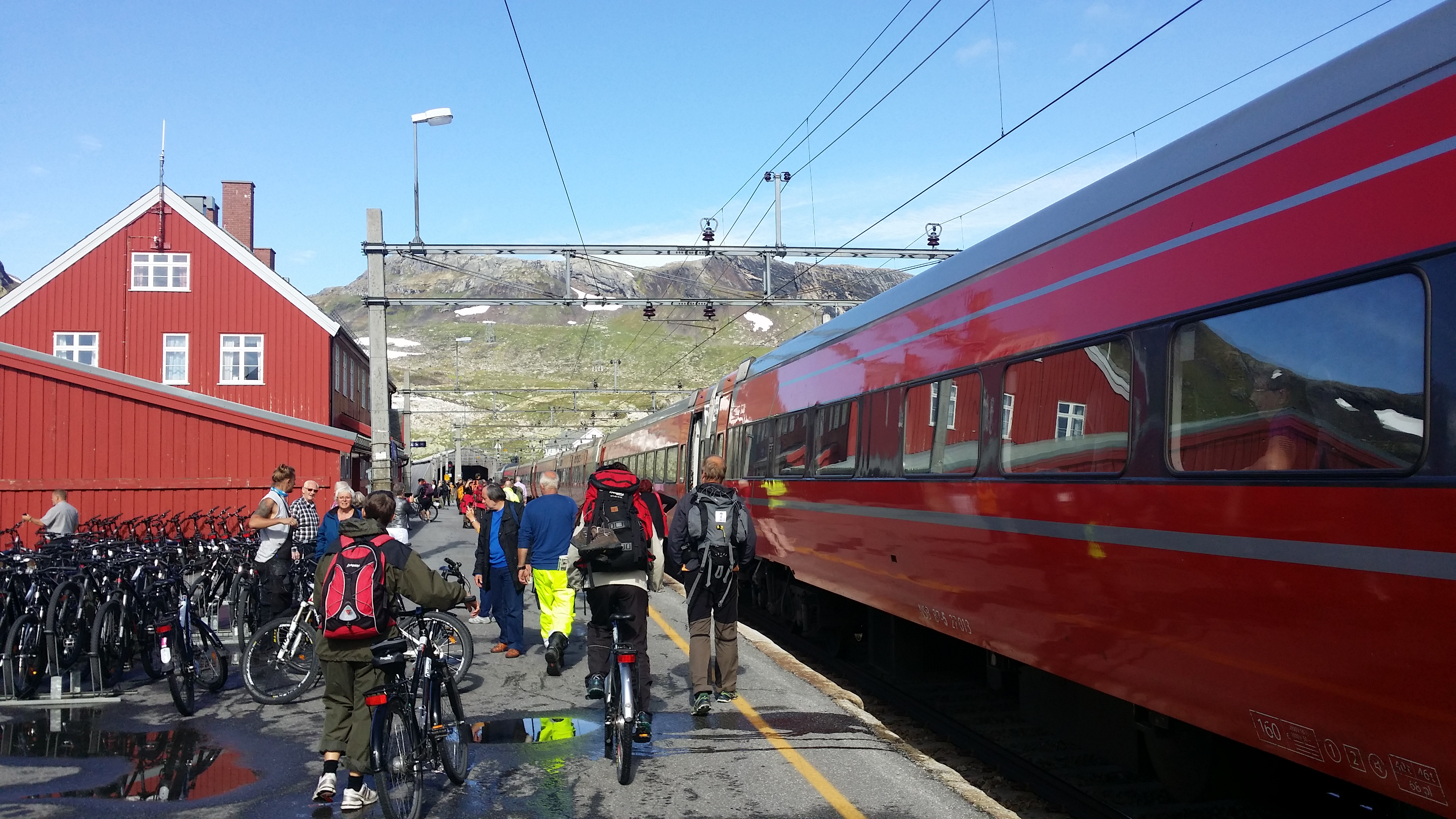
A Bergen Line train at Finse station

Finse is the highest point of Norway's railroad system, at 1222 meters above sea level

Since there are no public roads linking Finse to the outside world, the railway provides the sole means of year-round motorised transportation to and from Finse. As of 2023, the long-distance trains between Bergen and Oslo called at Finse with four daily departures in each direction on weekdays. Apart from these long-distance trains, Finse is not served by any railway services. Because the railway is the only means of transportation into or out of Finse, especially difficult weather conditions, rail accidents or damage to rail infrastructure can isolate it from the outside world. In 2020, a particularly difficult year, several separate incidents caused the Bergen Line to be closed for 4 days in total during the first three months of the year. These incidents included the destruction of an avalanche gallery and the derailing of a freight train, both occurring near Finse. The four days of closure equalled the total number of days without passenger traffic on the line during the previous decade.

In summer, it is possible to walk or cycle to Finse on the Rallarvegen rail trail, which stretches from Myrdal station or Flåm to Finse's west to Haugastøl station to its east. Originally built around the turn of the twentieth century as an access road for the workers constructing the railway, Rallarvegen has been open to the public as a bicycle trail since 1974 following a volunteer effort in the 1960s and 1970s. Motorised vehicles are permitted only by application in order to prevent damage to the trail. A railway navvy museum is located near the station, displaying exhibits concerning the construction of the railway line as well as two decommissioned snow-clearing engines which visitors are free to explore.

== Recreation ==
During the winter, Finse is popular for cross-country skiing, snowkiting (due to its location on the edge of the frozen lake Finsevatnet) and expedition training. The ill-fated Scott expedition to the South Pole trained here, and outside the hotel there is a monument to those that died.

There is one small drag lift which allows downhill skiing on one slope back into town. In summer, the recreational focus switches to mountain cycling (including on the aforementioned Rallarvegen trail) and hiking, including glacier hiking on the nearby "blue ice" glacier Hardangerjøkulen, the sixth largest glacier in mainland Norway.

== Research ==
Owing to its high altitude and cold climate, Finse is a centre for teaching and academic work on high-altitude biology. It is home to the Alpine Research Center operated by the University of Oslo and the University of Bergen. The research centre began its work in 1972, initially under the title of the High Mountain Ecological Research Station. The Centre hosts numerous workshops, conferences, and research projects from both Norwegian and international institutions. It is part of the EU funded International Network for Terrestrial Research and Monitoring in the Arctic (INTERACT).

== Climate ==
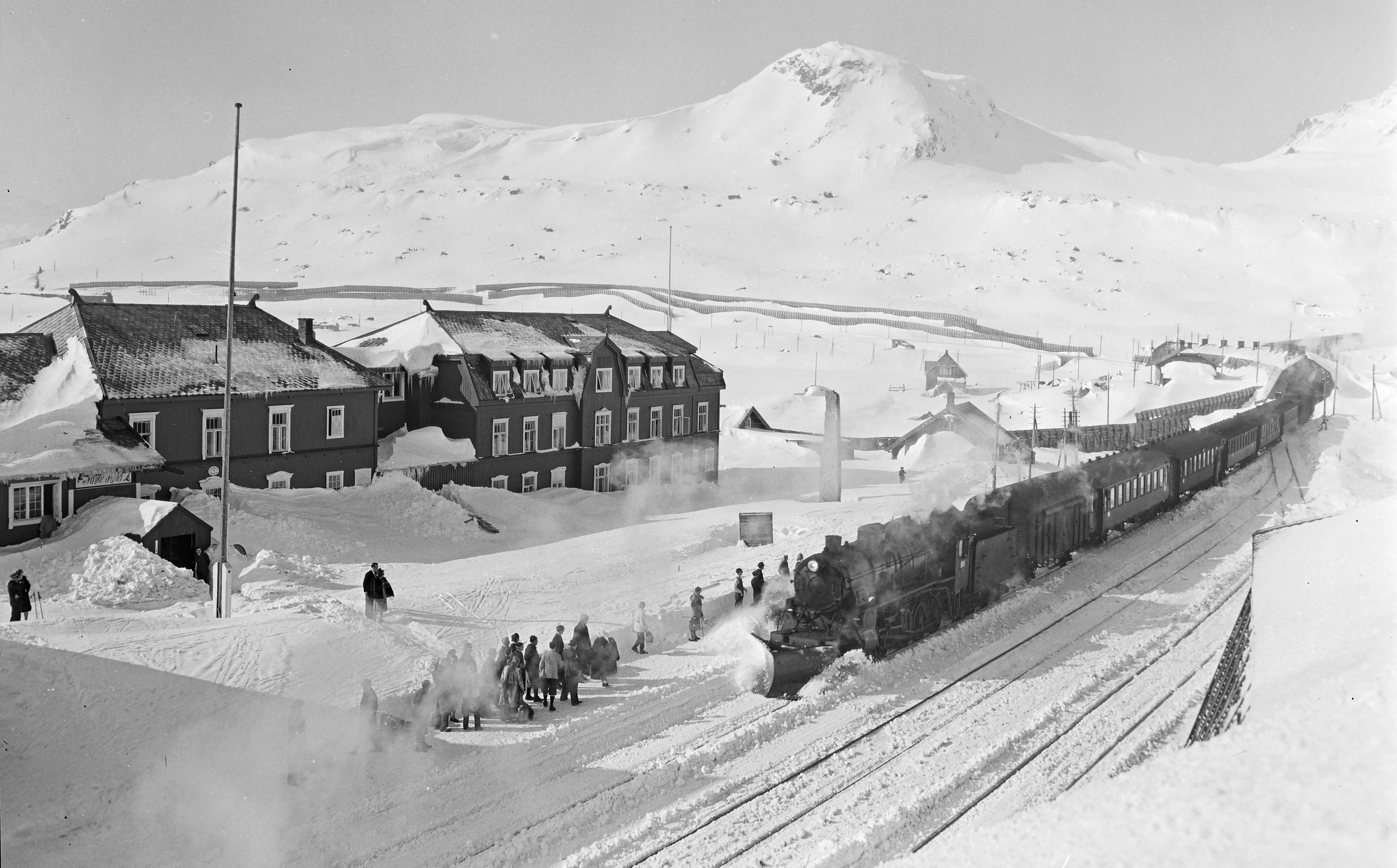
A train arriving at Finse station in 1948

Located at a high altitude, Finse has an alpine tundra climate (ET in the Köppen climate classification). The wettest season is late summer and autumn, and the driest season is spring. The closest weather station is Finsevatn, which has been operating since 1993 and is located about 1.5 kilometers south-east of Finse station. There is usually snow on the ground from late October or November to late May or June.

Climate data for Finsevatn 1991–2020 (1210 m), extremes 1980-present
Month	Jan	Feb	Mar	Apr	May	Jun	Jul	Aug	Sep	Oct	Nov	Dec	Year
Record high °C (°F)	6.6 (43.9)	16.0 (60.8)	10.5 (50.9)	20.8 (69.4)	19.6 (67.3)	22.1 (71.8)	24.1 (75.4)	24.2 (75.6)	17.7 (63.9)	16.2 (61.2)	8.4 (47.1)	7.8 (46.0)	24.2 (75.6)
Mean daily maximum °C (°F)	−6.1 (21.0)	−5.4 (22.3)	−3.3 (26.1)	1.2 (34.2)	4.8 (40.6)	9.2 (48.6)	12.5 (54.5)	11.5 (52.7)	7.6 (45.7)	2.7 (36.9)	−1.7 (28.9)	−4.1 (24.6)	2.4 (36.3)
Daily mean °C (°F)	−8 (18)	−8.7 (16.3)	−7.2 (19.0)	−3.5 (25.7)	0.5 (32.9)	4.5 (40.1)	8.6 (47.5)	8.3 (46.9)	4.9 (40.8)	−0.6 (30.9)	−4.4 (24.1)	−7.4 (18.7)	−1.1 (30.1)
Mean daily minimum °C (°F)	−11.2 (11.8)	−11.6 (11.1)	−10.6 (12.9)	−7.9 (17.8)	−2.6 (27.3)	1.4 (34.5)	5.5 (41.9)	5.6 (42.1)	2.6 (36.7)	−1.9 (28.6)	−6.3 (20.7)	−9.7 (14.5)	−3.9 (25.0)
Record low °C (°F)	−38.1 (−36.6)	−33.2 (−27.8)	−34.3 (−29.7)	−29.6 (−21.3)	−20.0 (−4.0)	−8.0 (17.6)	−3.7 (25.3)	−9.5 (14.9)	−7.1 (19.2)	−21.5 (−6.7)	−28.1 (−18.6)	−34.1 (−29.4)	−38.1 (−36.6)
Average precipitation mm (inches)	76 (3.0)	62 (2.4)	59 (2.3)	44 (1.7)	51 (2.0)	72 (2.8)	90 (3.5)	111 (4.4)	130 (5.1)	111 (4.4)	87 (3.4)	75 (3.0)	968 (38)
Source 1: yr.no/Met.no (normals)
Source 2: infoclimat.fr (extremes)

== In culture ==
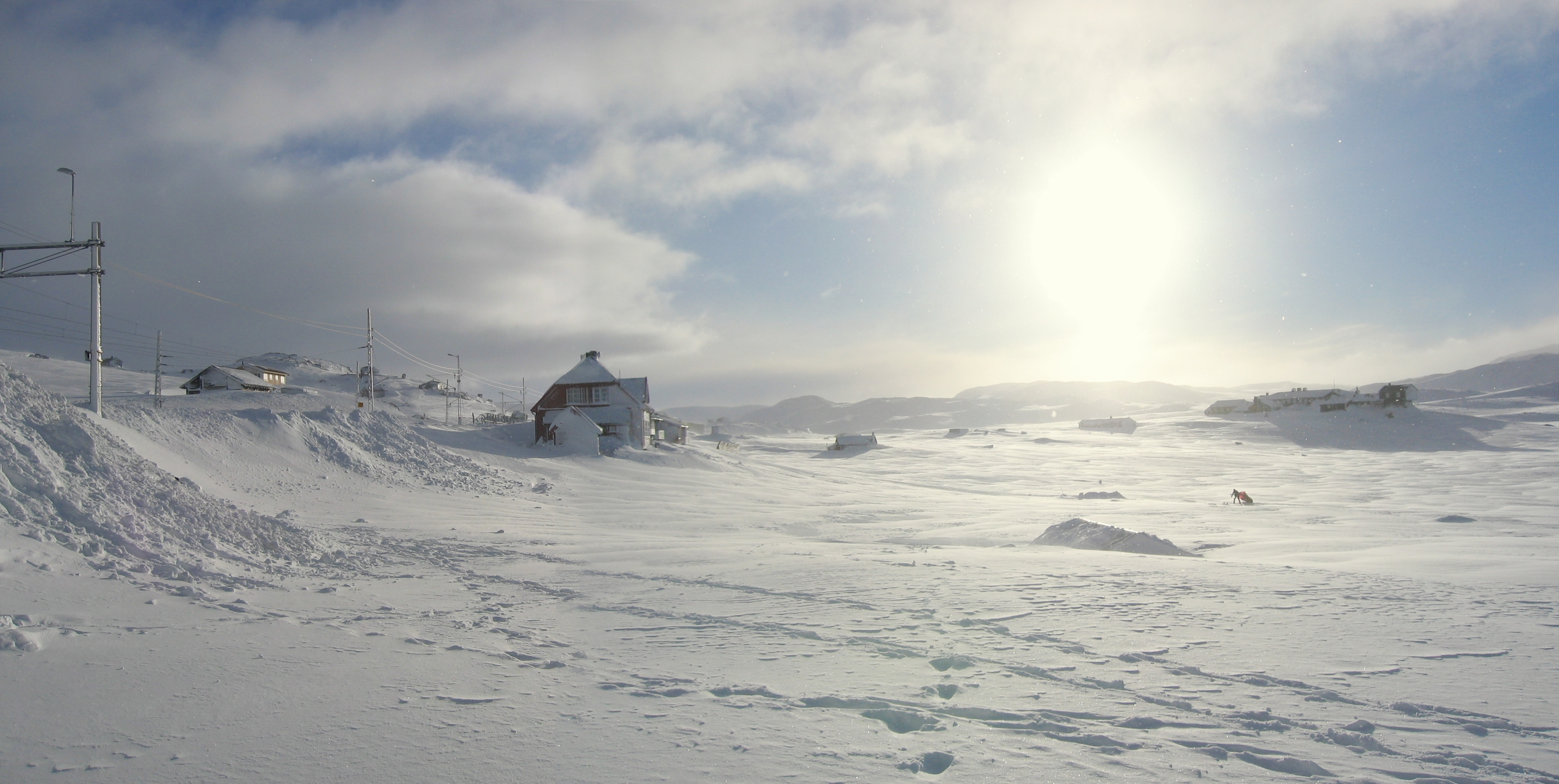
Finse in winter

Finse, including the Finse tunnel and the hotel Finse 1222, is the setting of Anne Holt's 2007 novel 1222. It is also the setting for the climax of the 1948 Hammond Innes novel The Blue Ice.

For the 1980 movie The Empire Strikes Back, the second feature film of the Star Wars franchise, Finse was used as filming location for several scenes taking place on the ice planet Hoth. The hotel at Finse hosted the production crew during filming, and a festival for Star Wars fans was held there from 2017—2020. According to the official PlayStation account on Twitter, the team behind the 2015 video game Star Wars Battlefront went to Finse to film in preparation for building the game's Hoth map.
