= Hallingskeid Station =

Railway station in Ulvik, Norway

Hallingskeid
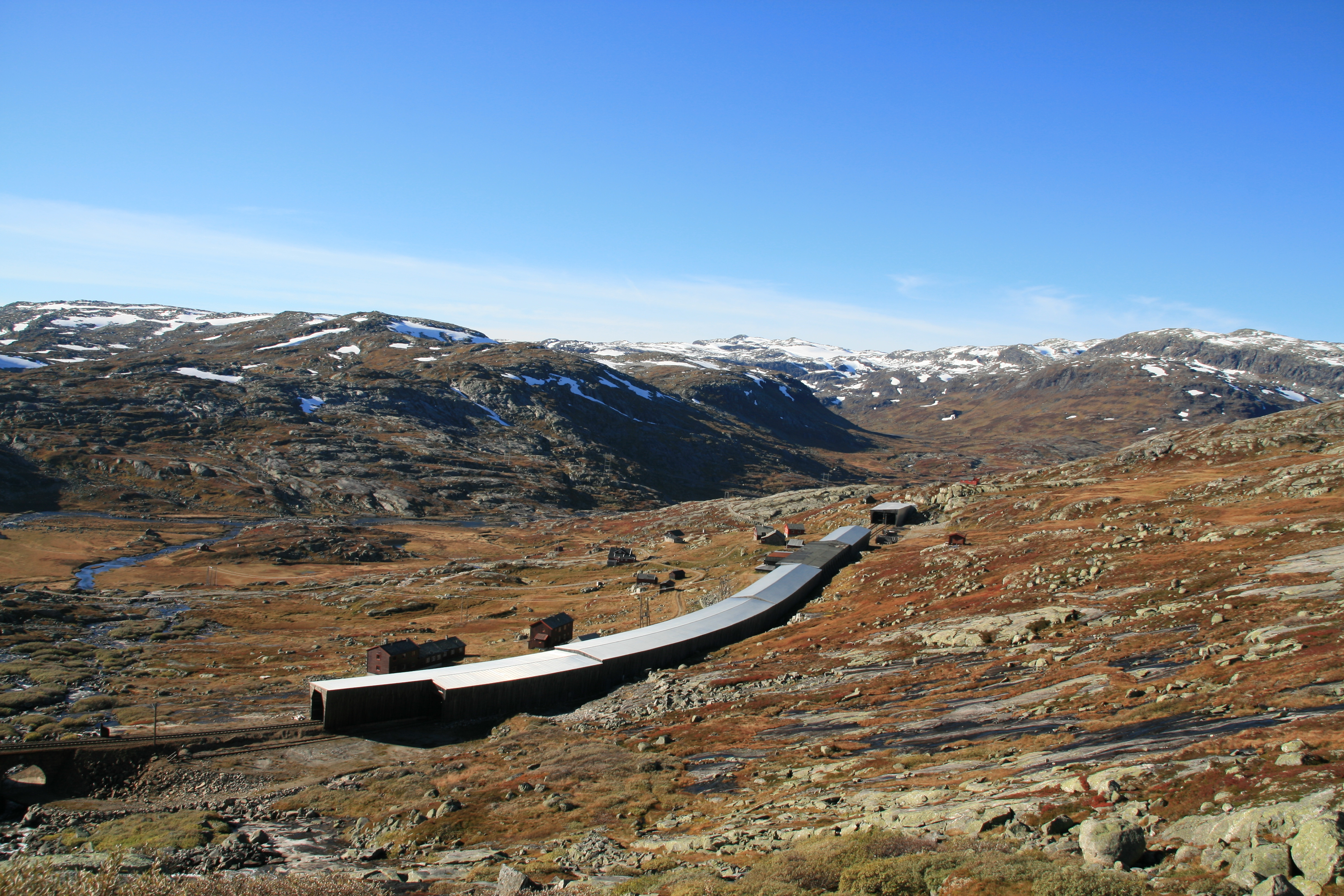
- The burned down snow tunnel

General information
- Location: Hallingskeid, Ulvik Municipality; Norway
- Coordinates: 60°40′N 7°15′E
- Elevation: 1,110 m (3,640 ft)
- Owner: Bane NOR
- Operator: Vy Tog
- Line: Bergen Line
- Distance: 322.80 km (200.58 mi)
- Platforms: 1

Construction
- Architect: Paul Due

History
- Opened: 10 June 1908
Location

Hallingskeid Station (Norwegian: Hallingskeid stasjon) is a train station on the Bergen Line in Ulvik Municipality in Vestland county, Norway. Located at an elevation of 1,110 meters (3,640 ft) above mean sea level, the station is situated inside a snow tunnel. It opened along with the central section of the line on 10 June 1908 and remained as a staffed station until 1982. It is located on the Hardangervidda plateau in an area without population or road access. The station therefore serves trekkers and mountaineers. Only some of the Vy Tog trains stop at the station.

The original station building was designed by Paul Due, who used the same architectural plan for four other mountain stations on the line. The snow tunnel has caught fire five times. The fires in 1948, 1953 and 2008 only caused minor damage to the tunnel itself. The 1960 fire burned-down the tunnel, the station building and most of the station area. The last fire, in 2011, had a Class 73 train caught in the tunnel; both it and the tunnel were damaged beyond repair.

== History ==
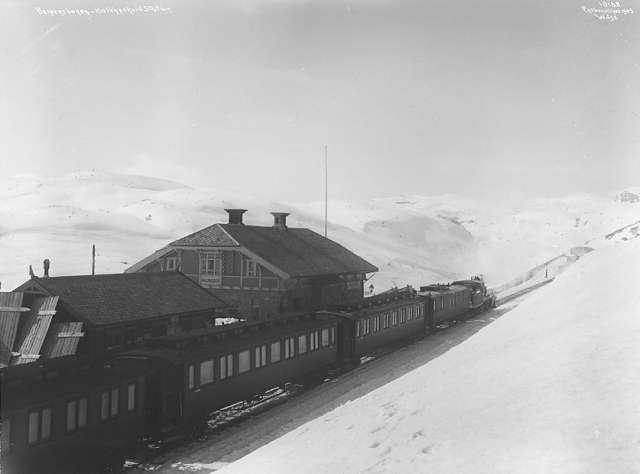
A train at the station in 1909, before the snow tunnel was built

The station was opened on 10 June 1908, along with the rest of the central portion of the Bergen Line. The station building was of the Mountain Station Variant 1 type, designed by Paul Due. This made it identical to Mjølfjell Station, and with only slight variations to Haugastøl Station, Finse Station and Myrdal Station. During construction, NSB built several buildings for their staff. Two of the houses and an assembly building have been preserved. They were built in 1900 and represent an example of buildings from the construction time. One is partially built in stone, partially in wood, while the other two are entirely in wood. All are now used as cabins. The sick ward for the navvies was bought by Kari Maristuen in 1909 converted to a hotel, named Fjellstova.

Because of the harsh winter conditions, the station area was gradually built with snow tunnels to keep the snow off the tracks. This included the platforms and most of the passing loop at the station. In 1914–15, the station serviced 398 passengers, and in 1919–20, it serviced 684 passengers, both times making it the least used station on the line. In 1948, the western part of the snow tunnel caught fire, and although it spread to the station building, it was quickly put out by the staff. In 1953, there was again a fire in the tunnel.

=== 1960 fire ===
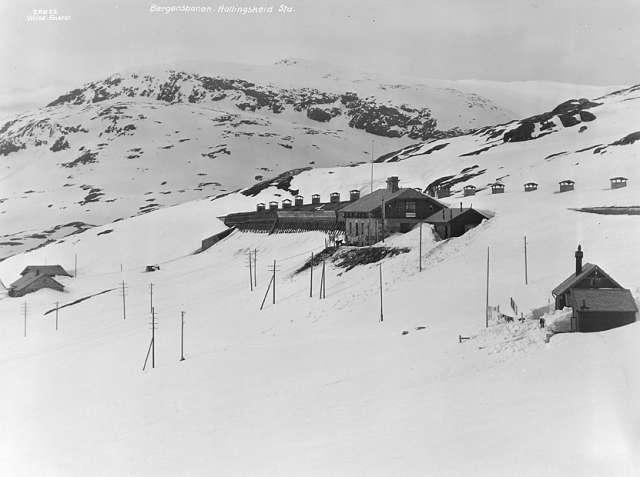
The original station building and tunnel in 1927, which burned down in 1960

In 1960, there was a major fire which burned down most of the station area. On 22 October, two boys were playing with matches and had lit some wood shavings in the tunnel, about 100 meters (330 ft) from the station building. The tunnel quickly caught on fire, which spread towards the other buildings. The fire was discovered by Station Master Mons Almenningen, who immediately notified Bergen Station, Myrdal Station, and Finse Station. The morning expresses in both directions were en route to Hallingskeid, with the east-bound train about half an hour away. It was forced to turn around at Myrdal, and the passengers were bused from Voss Station across the mountain. A train with a fire engine containing 20,000 litres (4,400 imp gal; 5,300 US gal) of water was sent from Myrdal and a fire engine was dispatched from Finse, but the fire spread quickly and within an hour the station building, the guard house and 500 meters (1,600 ft) of tunnel had burnt down. The incident occurred around noon. By 12:30 the next day, when the morning express passed the station, 500 meters (1,600 ft) of track had been replaced. Work had been done by 100 men in two shifts around the clock. Four families with a total of fourteen people lost their houses in the fire. The fire caused the hotel to burn down, and it was never rebuilt. A new station building opened in 1970 was built on the same foundation as the old.

The section past the station took electric traction into use on 7 December 1964. The station received automatic train control from 23 September 1982, and starting on 1 October 1982, the station became unstaffed. On 2 October 2008, there was a fire in a 100-meter (330 ft) long snow tunnel 2 kilometers (1.2 mi) west of Hallingskeid. Traffic was stopped and a combination of a fire train and helicopter put out the fire. However, the track and overhead lines past the station were destroyed. The line re-opened on 4 October.

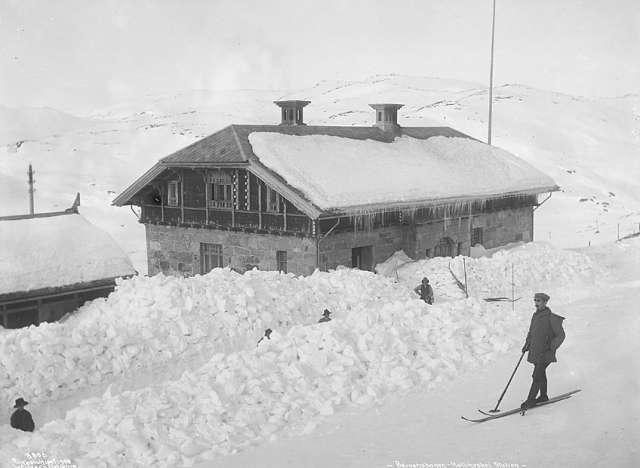
The station in 1908

=== 2011 fire ===
A fire started in the snow tunnel at Hallingskeid on 16 June 2011. It was caused by sparks from welding, which had been completed at 07:45. A freight train passed through the station at 09:16 and the welders left the station at 09:30. The passenger train that caught fire passed through the station at 10:06. As the station is unstaffed, there was no prior warning of the fire until the driver saw it from the cab just as the train entered the tunnel. The train almost immediately reached the point where the fire had caused the power cut. The driver applied the emergency brake, stopping the train 5 to 10 meters (16 to 33 ft) from the fire. Because the train had no power, it was not possible to reverse out. The 257 passengers, including two people in wheelchairs, were immediately evacuated, which took 15 to 20 minutes. Passengers were told to not bring any possessions with them, and many passengers lost valuables, such as laptop computers. All personnel acted according to regulations and no-one was injured in the accident. According to the motorman, had he not lost the power, he would have continued through the tunnel, as the fire was just beginning.

The Norwegian Civil Defence, who did the main bulk of the rescue work, stated that they had been planning on an exercise which would have been identical to the accident, with a train stuck in exactly the same tunnel while it was on fire. The rescue work was difficult, as there is no road connection to the area and all materials have to be transported to the area by air. In addition, the mobile telephone and radio network was out. Representatives stated that it would have been easier if they could have used the GSM-R network operated by the railway, which was functioning. The train, which consisted of a twin Class 73 electric multiple unit, burnt up and was destroyed in the fire. These cost 100 million kr (€12.7M as of June 2011) each. The fire forced the temporary closure of the Bergen Line, which was reopened in the evening on 23 June. The cost of the accident was 250 million kr (€31.8M as of June 2011), of which most was for the unit which was written off.

According to the Accident Investigation Board Norway, the rescue work was hampered by, among other things: lack of fire crew at Voss to drive the fire engine, a defective helicopter bucket, and a three-hour delay from the fire to a rail carriage with water was sent from Ål. Also, the fire carriage from Voss arrived six hours after the accident was reported. Concerns were raised regarding the fire hazards of wooden snow tunnels, and the National Rail Administration admitted that they should be made of a more fire-proof material, such as concrete or steel. Following the accident, the National Rail Administration decided that all welding would have to be monitored for several hours after completion of the work.

== Facilities and service ==
The station is located 322.80 kilometers (200.58 mi) from Oslo and at 1,110.1 meters (3,642 ft) above mean sea level. The station is not staffed and serves no local population. The area around the station has no road access, and the station serves only for trekking in the Hardangervidda plateau. There is a self-serve cabin run by the Norwegian Trekking Association nearby. The station building itself is owned by Bane NOR Eiendom, a subsidiary of Bane NOR. The station has a waiting room and washrooms. Up to three daily services in each direction of the Oslo–Bergen service, operated by the state railways, call at Hallingskeid, with up to two bypassing the station each day.

Preceding station			Following station
Myrdal	Bergen Line		Finse
Preceding station	Express trains		Following station
Myrdal	F4	Bergen–Oslo S	Finse
