= Finse Tunnel =

Railway tunnel in Vestland county, Norway

Coordinates: 60°37′23″N 7°24′19″E

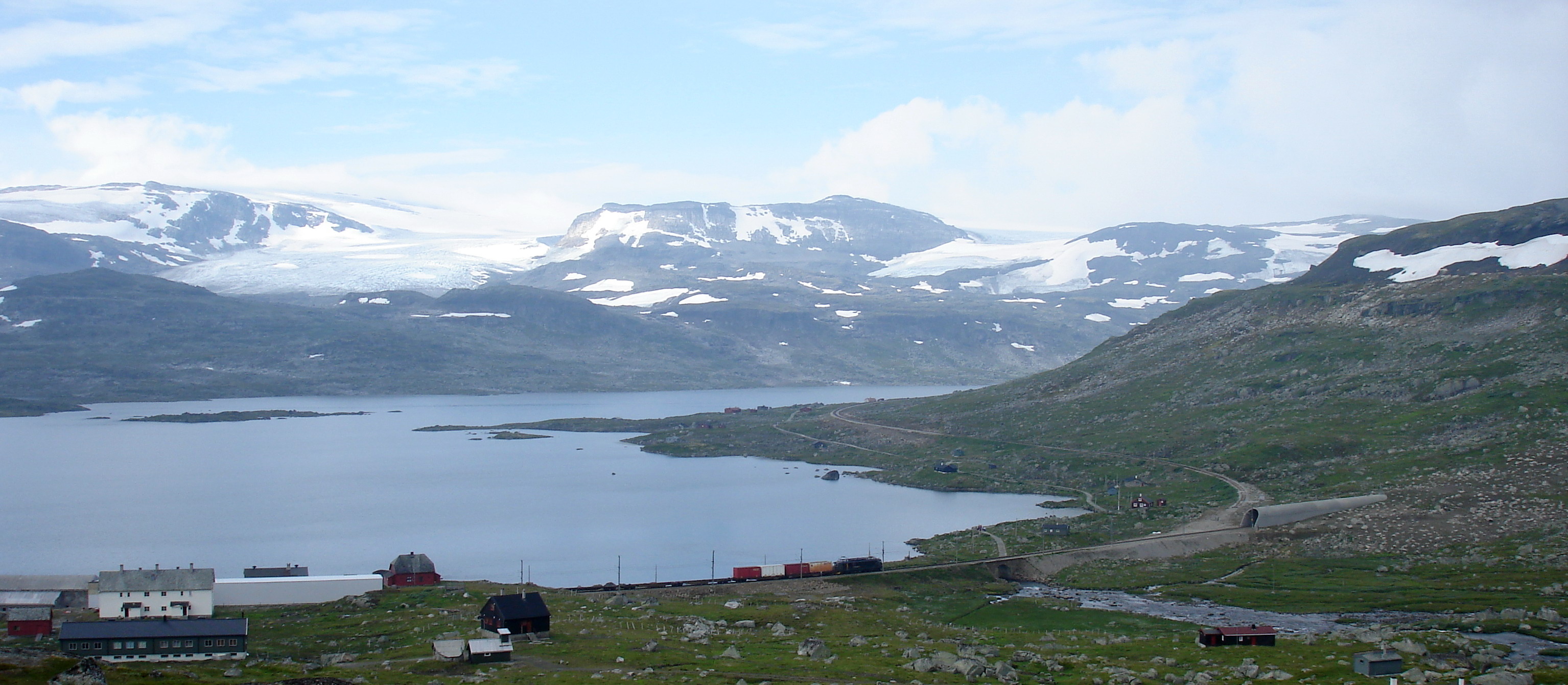
- A freight train about to enter the Finse Tunnel
- Interactive map of Finse Tunnel

Overview
- Line: Bergen Line
- Location: Finse, Norway
- System: Norwegian railway network

Operation
- Opened: 16 May 1993
- Owner: Bane NOR
- Operator: Vy Tog; CargoNet

Technical
- Line length: 10,300 m (6.4 mi)
- No. of tracks: Single
- Track gauge: 1,435 mm (4 ft 8 1/2 in)
- Electrified: 15 kV 16.7 Hz AC
- Max elevation: 1,237 m (4,058 ft)

The Finse Tunnel (Norwegian: Finsetunnelen) is a 10,300-metre-long (6.4 mi; 11,300 yd) railway tunnel west of the village of Finse in Eidfjord Municipality in Vestland county, Norway. The tunnel is part of the Bergen Line between the cities of Oslo and Bergen. It is the longest tunnel on the line, and the third longest railway tunnel in the kingdom. Inside the tunnel, at 1,237 metres (4,058 ft) elevation, is the highest point on the Norwegian railway network.

The tunnel was constructed to increase the regularity of the line past the Finse peak which was often blocked by snow. Planning started during the 1980s to remove this section that was regularly snowed down, and at the same time reduce the length and increase the speed of the railway. Construction started in 1990, and it was opened by King Harald V on 16 May 1993. Following the construction of the tunnel, 32 kilometres (20 mi) of railway around this area was also rebuilt to achieve higher train speeds, a shorter overall distance, and to maximize the natural protection from the weather. This was built in five stages, opening between 1995 and 1998.

== History ==
When the Bergen Line opened in 1909, it was the first railway to connect Eastern and Western Norway. The railway had faced many engineering challenges during construction, and after it opened, winter proved to be a fierce enemy to holding the railway open. Especially the parts around Finse proved extremely difficult to manage. Despite the use of single-locomotive rotary snowplows running continually through the day, the track was snowed out frequently, and on a few occasions days passed before the track could be cleared.

=== Launch of an idea ===
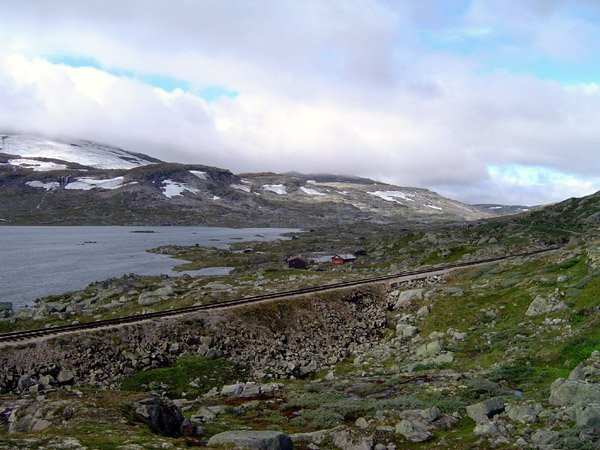
Part of the now abandoned part of the Bergen Line that was replaced by the Finse Tunnel

To solve this challenge, the Norwegian State Railways (NSB) had built snow sheds along the track, especially on the section between Finse Station and Hallingskeid Station. Of the 20.7-kilometre (12.9 mi) line between the two stations, 10.5 kilometres (6.5 mi) was under snow sheds and 2.5 kilometres (1.6 mi) was in tunnel. Along this part of the line was the highest point of the railways, 1,301.7 metres (4,271 ft) at a point named Taugevatn.

During the 1980s, the repeated operational breaks and high costs related to the Bergen Line past Finse was a constant problem for NSB and in 1983 the director, Robert Nordén launched the idea of a tunnel through the mountain. He was backed by the engineering staff in NSB, who felt that a tunnel would be a simple way of solving many of the challenges relating to the railway operations. Estimates calculated the cost of the investment at 170 million kr, including the upgrade of part of the line east of Finse Station. In addition to the argument for better regularity on the Bergen Line, NSB pointed out that the cost structure of railway operations had changed, making it relatively more expensive to operate snow sheds, that required rebuilding about every twenty years, than to build a tunnel, that would be excavated using heavy and automated machinery. NSB launched the idea to start construction after Oslo Central Station was scheduled for completion in 1989.

It was decided to build the new line on the east side of Finse that would both permit higher speeds—allowing through speeds of 170 kilometres per hour (110 mph)—and at the same time move the line to a more protected right-of-way, to take advantage of natural protection against the weather. In total the two proposals would mean that 32 kilometres (20 mi) of railway would be rebuilt. The higher speed limit was seen as part of a long-term plan to shorten down travel time on the Bergen Line—a plan that would include shortening the line with Ringerike Line from Hønefoss to Sandvika, as well as gradual upgrades of the line.

The plans were taken up to political level in 1987, when they were launched by the Standing Committee on Transport and Communications of the Norwegian Parliament. Due to the possibility of covering the investment costs through savings on operations, the committee asked the Norwegian Ministry of Transport and Communications to prioritize the tunnel on their budget proposals. At the political level, the Finse Tunnel had to compete with upgrades in Eastern Norway, where NSB was planning to launch the InterCity Express service. The government chose to try to delay the decision to build the Finse Tunnel until after 1990 so it could be considered along with other railway projects in a central plan. Calculations showed a benefit-cost ratio of 1.93, making it a highly profitable venture for the government. The Minister of Transport and Communications, Kjell Borgen, wanted to give priority to the new line from Ski to Moss. It was not until after the 1989 election that Parliament managed to pass the necessary priorities to start construction, which started in 1990.

=== Construction ===
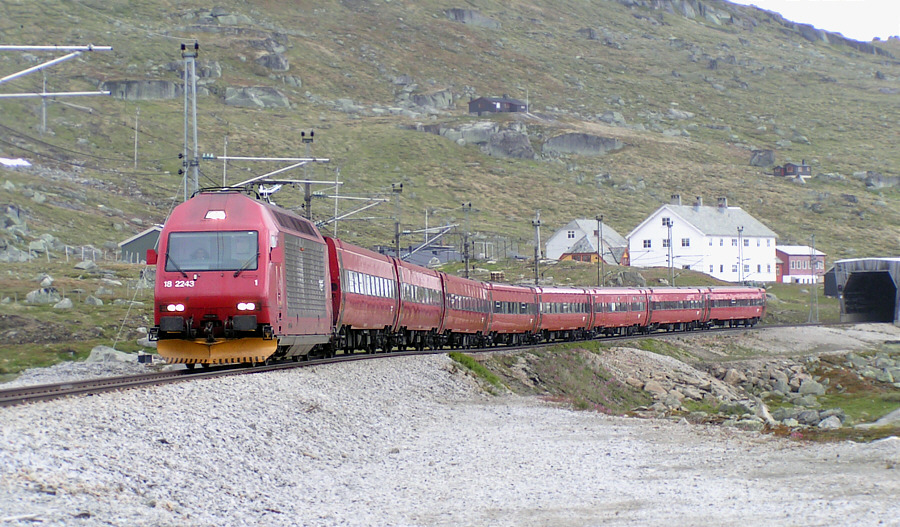
An NSB El 18 hauling B7 cars just leaving the Finse snow shed

The Finse Tunnel was built along with two kilometres of extra line at-grade. Total costs were estimated at 290 million kr, and reduce the line length by 4.5 kilometres (2.8 mi) and the time by 8–10 minutes. Construction started in 1990, and the tunnel was completed in 1992. The tunnel was not electrified before it was too late to continue construction for the winter. This, in addition to the lack of connection of the tunnel rail tracks to the main railway prior to winter made it impossible to use the tunnel in the 1992–93 winter season. In the tunnel there had to be a 900-metre (3,000 ft) passing loop, named Fagernut, to ensure even distances between passing loops along the line. There is also a short side track ending at a turntable, used when snowplows were unidirectional. On 16 May 1993 the tunnel was opened, costing in total 480 million kr. The snow clearance base at Finse Station was closed down after the tunnel was constructed.

The second part of the construction project consisted of the 11-kilometre (6.8 mi) line from Tunga to Finse, and was with the exception of one 300-metre (980 ft) tunnel all at grade. The old line was built for speeds of 70 kilometres per hour (43 mph), with the new line allowing speeds of 170 kilometres per hour (110 mph). These sections were built in five stages, with the first completed in 1995, and the last in 1998. The total cost for this part of the line were 280 million kr.

== Safety ==
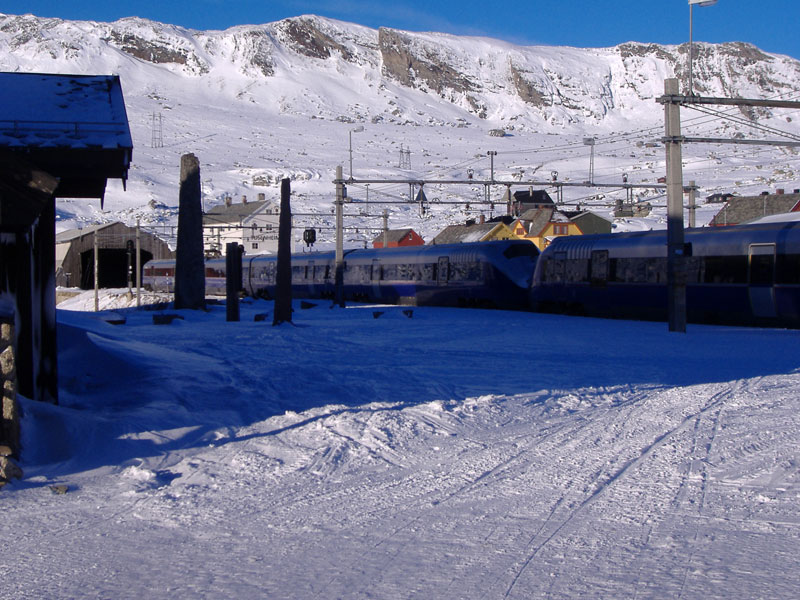
The Finse snow shed as seen from Finse Station; NSB Class 73 in the foreground

A report from 2004 warned that the tunnel might be a potential fire hazard because of the difficulty in accessing the tunnel with rescue equipment. The Finse Tunnel, unlike most other tunnels on the line, does have some safety equipment such as communications systems, lighting, and emergency areas, but the report was critical of the ability to evacuate the tunnel. There is only 1 metre (3.3 ft) of clearance on each side of the trains, and it would take between two and three hours to get fire fighters to the scene, since the tunnel is located in an area without roads. However, the probability of a fire occurring in the tunnel was considered very small.
