= Haugastøl Station =

Railway station in Hol, Norway

Haugastøl
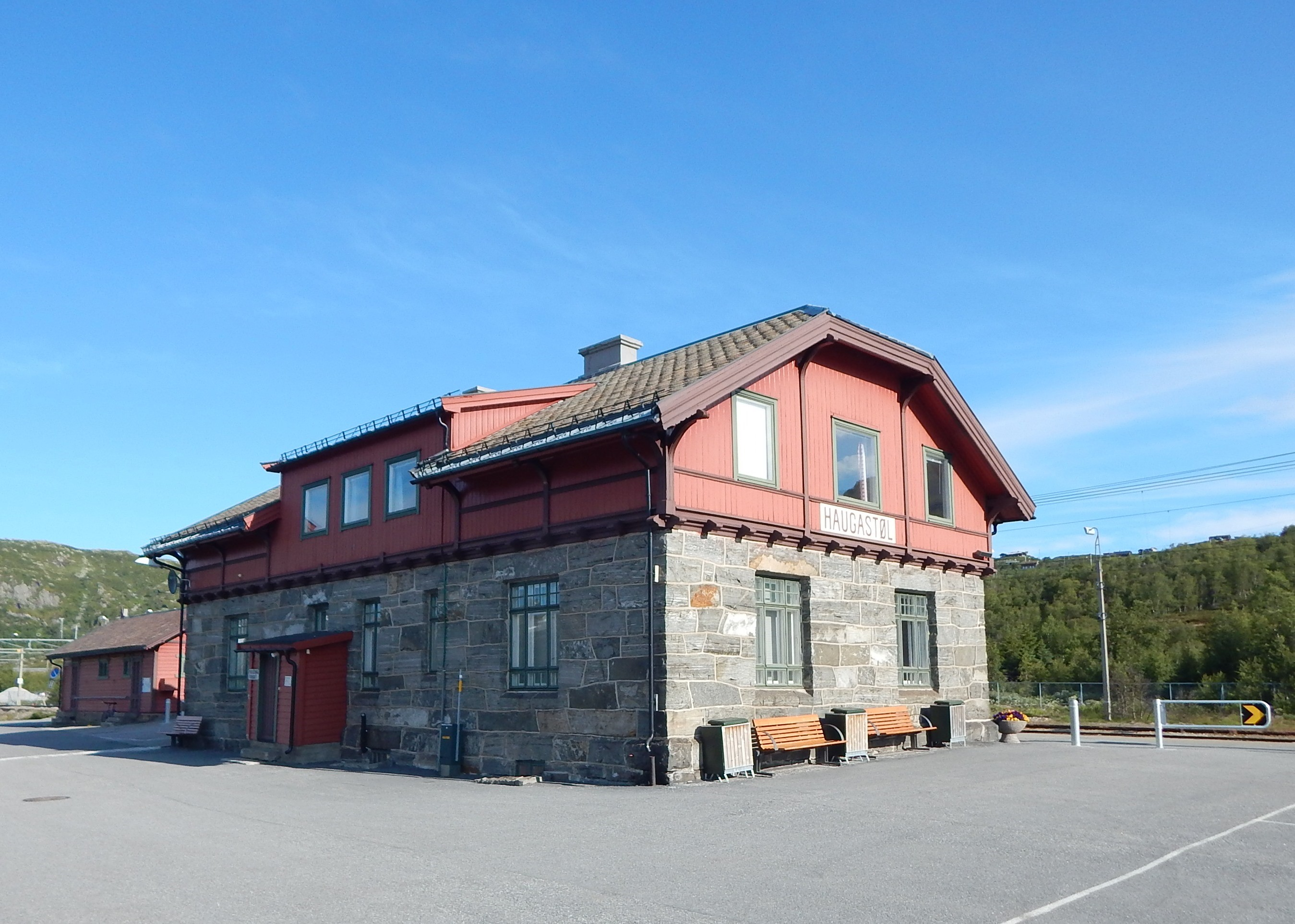

General information
- Location: Haugastøl, Hol; Norway
- Coordinates: 60.51136°N 7.86990°E
- Elevation: 988.0 m (3,241.5 ft)
- Owner: Bane NOR
- Operator: Vy Tog
- Line: Bergen Line
- Distance: 275.50 kilometres (171.19 mi)
- Platforms: 1

History
- Opened: 1908
Location

Haugastøl (Haugastøl stasjon) is a station on the Bergen Line in Norway. The station is located in the Hol municipality situated between the stations Ustaoset to the east and Finse to the west. The station is 275.50 kilometres (171.19 mi) from Oslo if one follows the track over Roa. The altitude is 988 metres (3,241 ft) above sea level.

== History ==
The station was opened in 1908. The station building was designed by the architect Paul Armin Due (1870-1926) and is a hybrid between the National Romantic style and the Jugendstil. The building was renovated in 1963 with the addition of lavatories. In 2002 the Norwegian Directorate for Cultural Heritage declared the building worthy of protection.

The Rallarvegen cycling and hiking path, which was originally constructed to aid the construction of the railway, starts at Haugastøl giving the station significant traffic during the summer. The station is also staffed during the summer. Haugastøl is not among the main stations on the mountainous stretch, and the fast express trains do not serve the station.

Preceding station			Following station
Finse	Bergen Line		Ustaoset
Preceding station	Express trains		Following station
Finse	F4	Bergen–Oslo S	Ustaoset
