= Finse Station =

Railway station in Ulvik, Norway

Finse
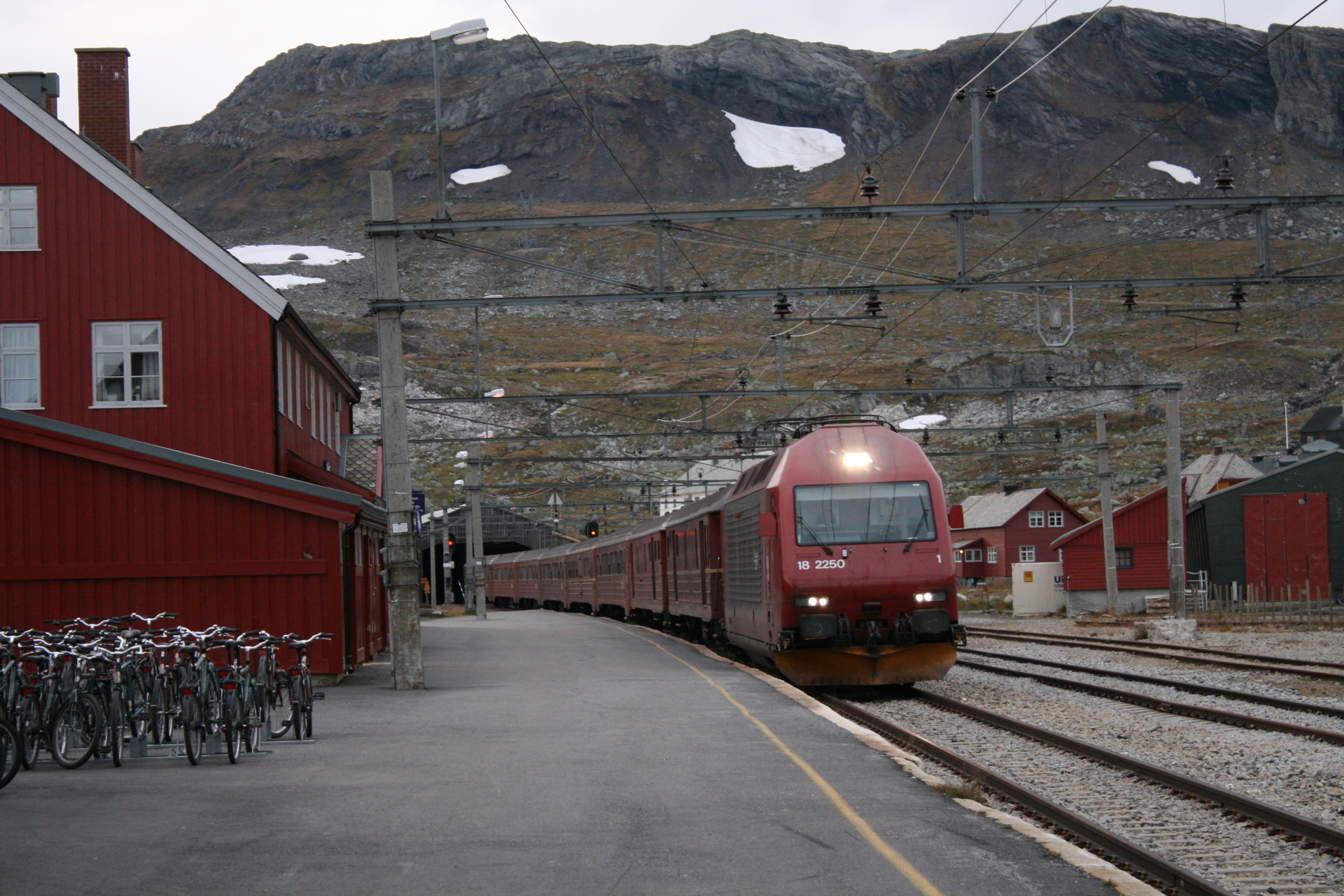

General information
- Location: Finse, Ulvik Municipality; Norway
- Coordinates: 60.601938°N 7.503893°E
- Elevation: 1,222.2 m (4,010 ft)
- Owner: Bane NOR
- Operator: Vy Tog
- Line: Bergen Line
- Distance: 302.10 km (187.72 mi)
- Platforms: 2

Construction
- Architect: Paul Armin Due

History
- Opened: 10 June 1908
Location

Finse Station (Norwegian: Finse stasjon) is located in the mountain village of Finse in Ulvik Municipality in Vestland county, Norway. The station is served by up to seven daily (peak days only) express trains in each direction, normally three per day and one overnight trains, all operated by Vy Tog. The Finse Tunnel begins just west of the village and the Rallarvegen goes through the village.

The station also features a navvy museum, dedicated to the builders of the railways in Norway. One of Norway's popular hiking trails also starts at the station and ends in the village of Aurlandsvangen after a four-day trek. Finse station is the only access point to Hardangerjøkulen; the glacier is clearly visible from the station area and the village.

== History ==
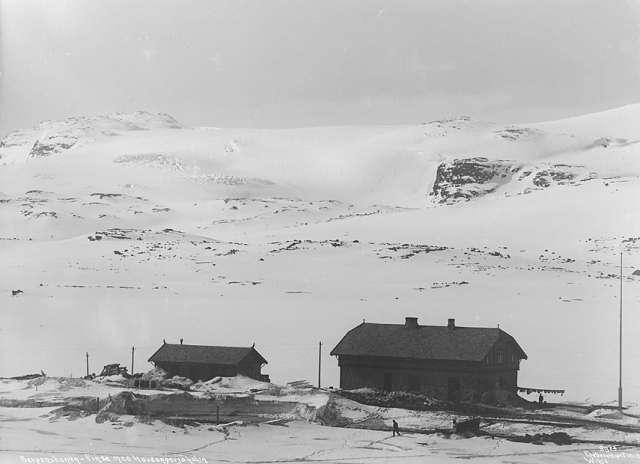
The station in 1908

The station was opened as part of the Bergen Line on 10 June 1908, five years after the first hotel was built in Finse. Since there is no (public) road access, the railway is the sole access to the area. After the railway came, Finse grew as a recreational area, and also received a small amount of permanent residents, at the most 200 people, including a school and a store. The proximity and easy access to both Bergen and Oslo made Finse a popular mountain resort, but during the 1960s and 1970s the tourist traffic declined, as did the village, and during the 1980s it virtually died when the school and store closed. Finse Station still operates the oldest and highest situated post office in Norway, founded on 1 March 1904.

Paul Armin Due designed the station building in the jugendstil; originally with one and half storeys, it soon outgrew the traffic and was extended in length and in height. The second store was then built in wood. There was also two locomotive depots at Finse, used to store the snowplows. The restaurant was taken over by Norsk Spisevognselskap on 1 January 1928. It retained operations until 17 June 1946, when it was privatised. Finse was one of the bases for snow removal on the railway until 1993 when the Finse Tunnel opened. At the same time the station, at 1,222.2 metres (4,010 ft) above mean sea level, became the highest point on the Norwegian railway network.

Preceding station			Following station
Hallingskeid	Bergen Line		Haugastøl
Preceding station	Express trains		Following station
Hallingskeid	F4	Bergen–Oslo S	Haugastøl
