= National Transport Plan =

The National Transport Plan (Norwegian: Nasjonal transportplan or NTP) is a ten-year investment plan for all modes of transport in Norway passed by the Parliament of Norway every four years. The plan coordinates the investments carried out by the Norwegian National Rail Administration, the Norwegian Public Roads Administration, the Norwegian Coastal Administration and airport and air traffic operator Avinor.

The plan gets renewed every fourth year. Each time it gets approved by parliament, it is not binding.
