= Rallarvegen =

Road in Norway

Coordinates: 60°31′45″N 7°48′08″E

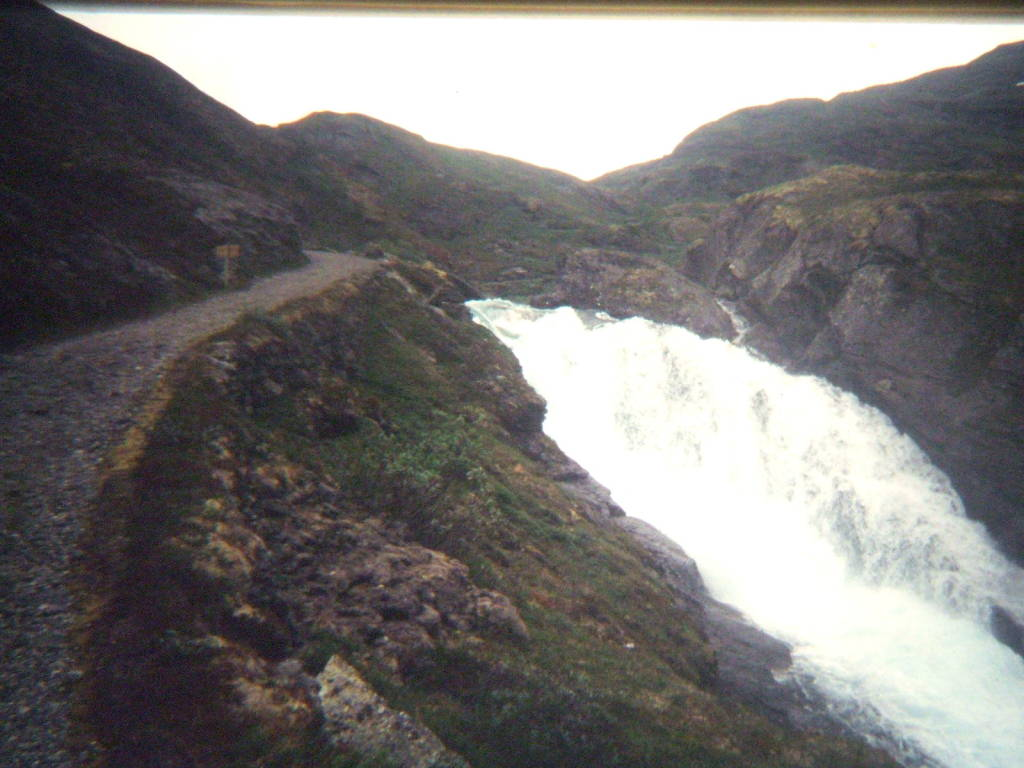
Rallarvegen and waterfalls

Rallarvegen - Haugastøl to Flåm section

Rallarvegen (English: The Navvy Road) is a construction/access road in central Norway that is now popular as a recreation trail for bicyclists. It was built from 1902 to 1904 in connection with the construction of the Bergen Line. The road is maintained by the Norwegian National Rail Administration as an access road for the railroad.

In the late 1960s, editor and former manager of Norske Ungdomsherberger Odd Strand took the initiative to build a cycle path along the old construction road. The work was carried out on a voluntary basis from 1970, and completed in August 1974.

The road runs from Haugastøl Station in Hol Municipality in Buskerud county to Finse Station in Ulvik Municipality in Vestland county. It continues across the mountains to Myrdal Station in Aurland Municipality. It then goes north through the Flåmsdalen valley to the village of Flåm on the shore of the Sognefjorden. A second portion of the road heads west through the Raundalen valley from Upsete to Vossevangen. Upsete Station is about 6 kilometres (3.7 mi) from Myrdal Station, separated by the Gravhals Tunnel that runs through the mountains. In all, the road is 123 kilometres (76 mi) long: 80 kilometres (50 mi) from Haugestøl to Flåm, and then another 43 kilometres (27 mi) from Upsete to Voss.

The road is named after the "rallar" or navvies, the railway construction workers and "vegen" means the road, so the name literally means "the navvy road".

The road is now a popular bicycle road. Every year, in the short season from July to September, over 20,000 cyclists travel the route. It is unpaved, and maintained by the railroad with period materials.

== Media gallery ==
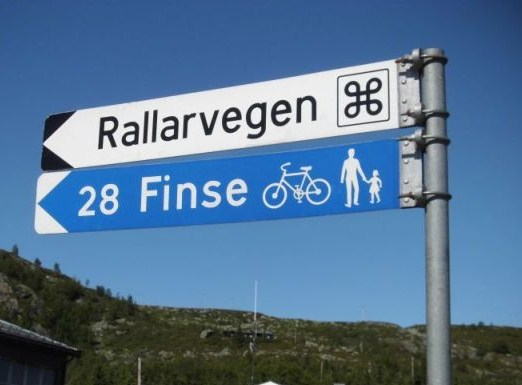
Signpost

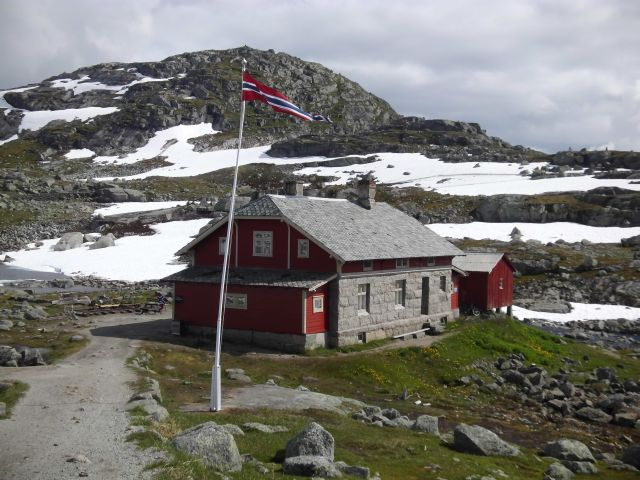
Former railroad watchman's house in Fagernut

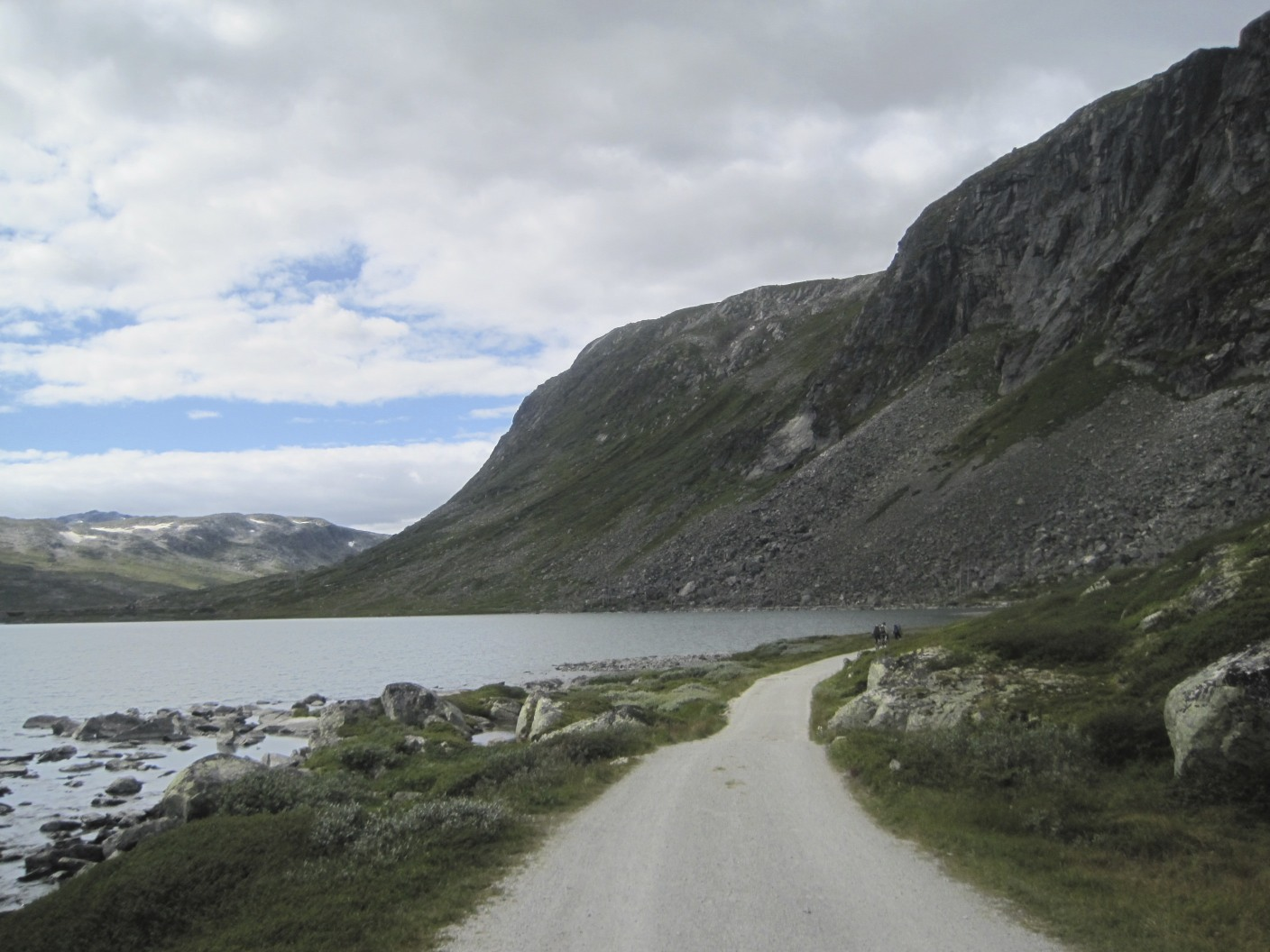
View by the lake Nedre Storurdevatnet

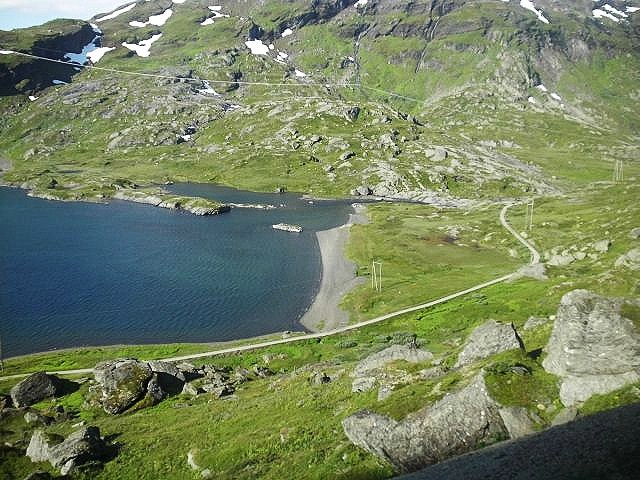
View from the train

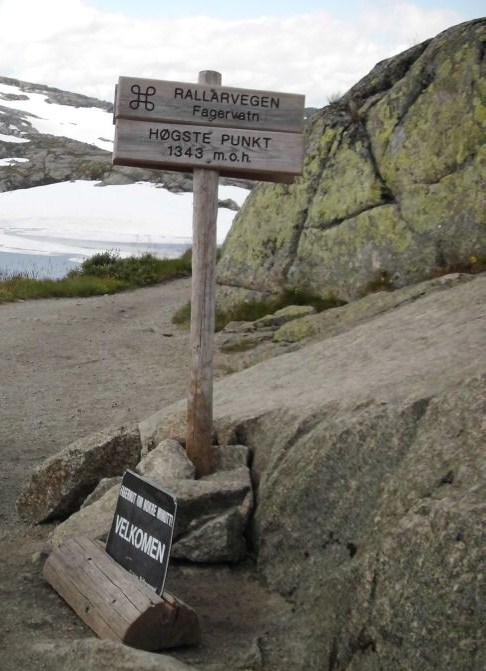
Highest point on the trail

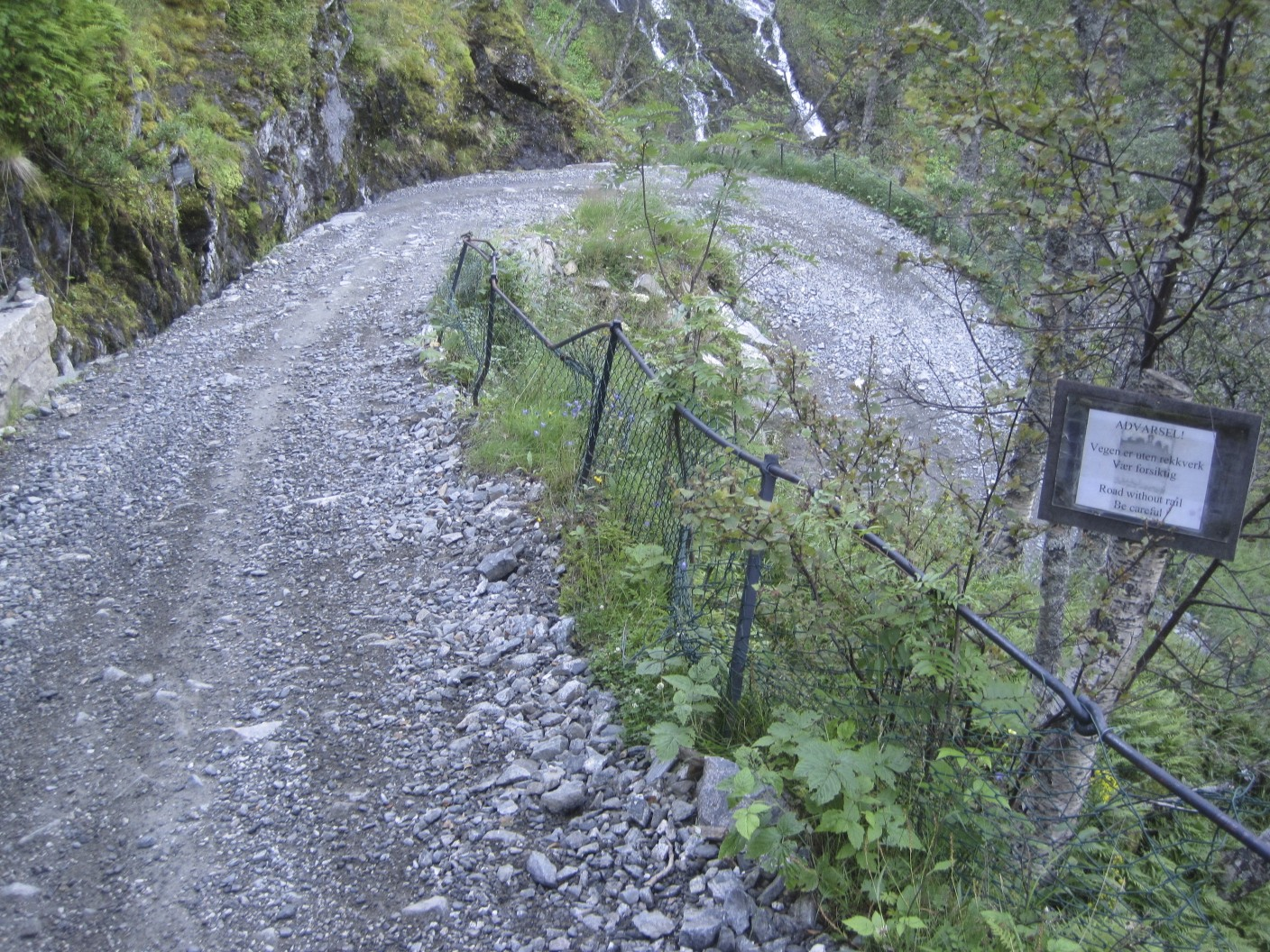
Typical hairpin turn
