= Bergen Line =

Norwegian railway line

Coordinates: 60°20′16″N 7°49′20″E

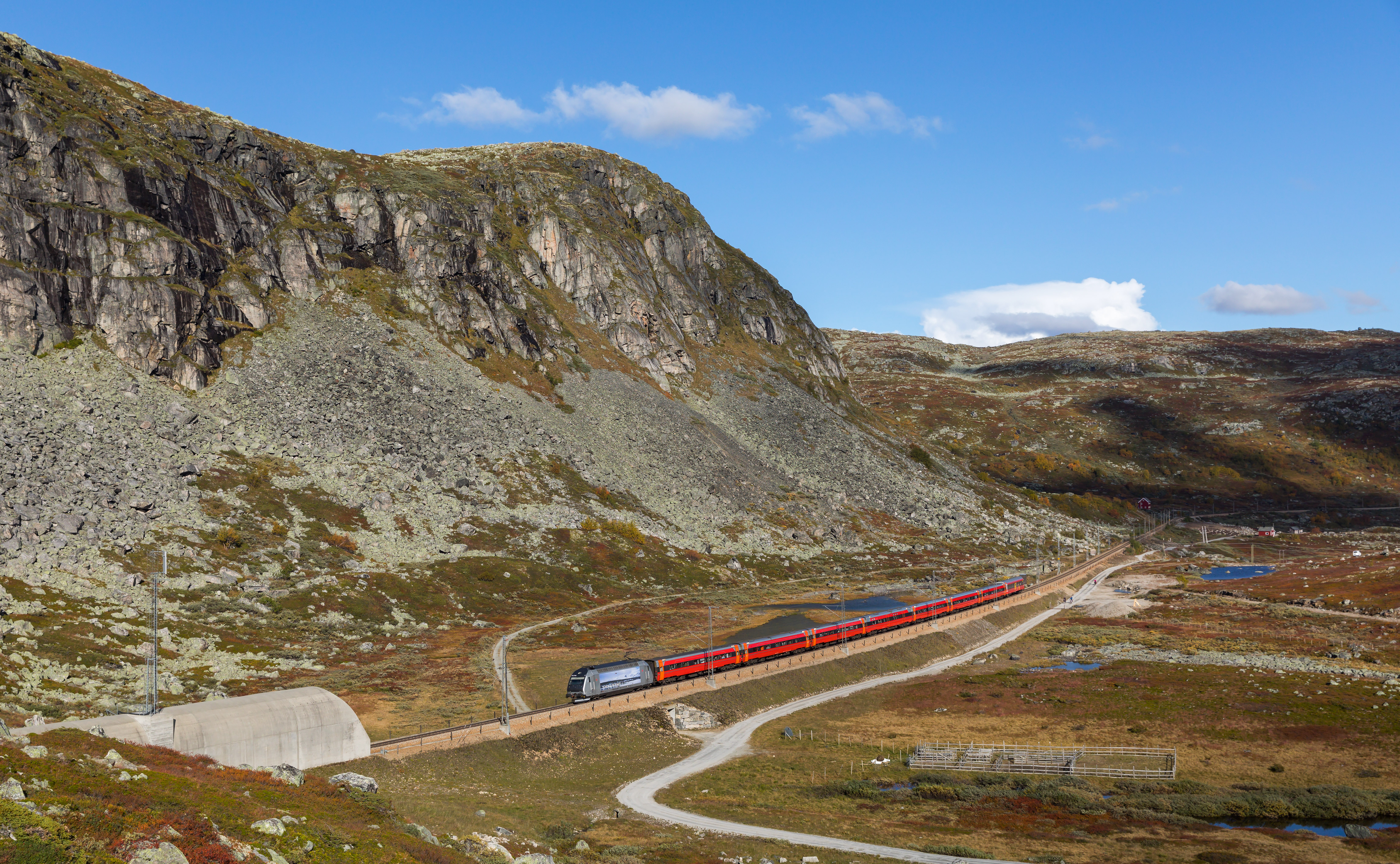
- Westbound train east of Tungevatnet, between Haugastøl and Finse

Overview
- Native name: Bergensbanen
- Owner: Bane NOR
- Termini: Hønefoss; Bergen
- Stations: 39

Service
- Type: Railway
- System: Norwegian railway
- Operator(s): Vy Tog; CargoNet
- Rolling stock: El 18

History
- Opened: 27 November 1909

Technical
- Line length: 371 km (231 mi)
- Number of tracks: Single
- Character: Express trains Freight trains
- Track gauge: 1,435 mm (4 ft 8 1/2 in)
- Electrification: 15 kV 16.7 Hz AC
- Operating speed: 160 km/h (100 mph)
- Highest elevation: 1,237 metres (4,058 ft)

The Bergen Line, or the Bergen Railway (Bokmål: Bergensbanen or Nynorsk: Bergensbana), is a 371-kilometre (231 mi) long scenic standard gauge railway line between Bergen and Hønefoss, Norway. The name is often applied to the entire route from Bergen to Oslo, including the Randsfjord and Drammen lines between Hønefoss and Oslo, covering a total distance of 496 kilometres (308 mi). It is the highest mainline railway line in Northern Europe, crossing the Hardangervidda plateau at 1,237 metres (4,058 ft) above sea level.

The railway opened from Bergen to Voss in 1883 as the narrow gauge Voss Line. In 1909, the route was continued over the mountain to Oslo and the whole route converted to standard gauge, and the Voss Line became part of the Bergen Line. The line is single track, and was electrified in 1954–64. The Bergen Line is owned and maintained by Bane NOR, and served with passenger trains by Vy Tog and freight trains by CargoNet. The Flåm Line remains as the only branch line, after the closure of the Hardanger Line. The western section from Bergen to Voss is also served by the Bergen Commuter Rail, and was shortened following the 1966 opening of the Ulriken Tunnel.

== History ==
=== The Voss Line ===
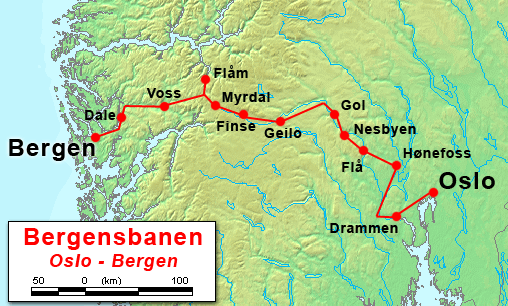
Map of the Bergen Line and principal stations

The first documented proposal for building a railway between Norway's two largest cities was announced by Andreas Tanberg Gløersen on 24 August 1871 in Bergensposten. The forest supervisor in Voss suggested building the railway via Voss and Hallingdal, connecting with the Krøderen Line. In 1866, Gløersen had come up with the idea of the Jæren Line. Within days of his proposal for the Bergen Line, the city council expressed support for the suggestion. In 1872, the railway director Carl Abraham Pihl and two engineers went on a survey tour along suggested line. At the time it was common that proposals for railways came from local initiative, and that local municipalities and private investors would then pay for about 20% of the investments, the state covering the rest, mostly through foreign debt.

==== Political processes ====
On 20 October 1871 two engineers traversed the two possible routes from Bergen to Voss; the one via Fana, Os and Hardangerfjord, the other via Dale and Sørfjord. Though covering a less populated area, the latter would be cheaper to build, and have less elevation. A railway committee was created on 25 January 1872 with a limited mandate, which was expanded on 20 December. At the same time there was a dispute between the Ministry of Labour and Pihl about whether to prioritize the Bergen Line, but in July 1872 surveys were performed in person by Pihl and two engineers, and their report was positive. At the same time he launched the idea of a branch line up Valdres to Lærdal.

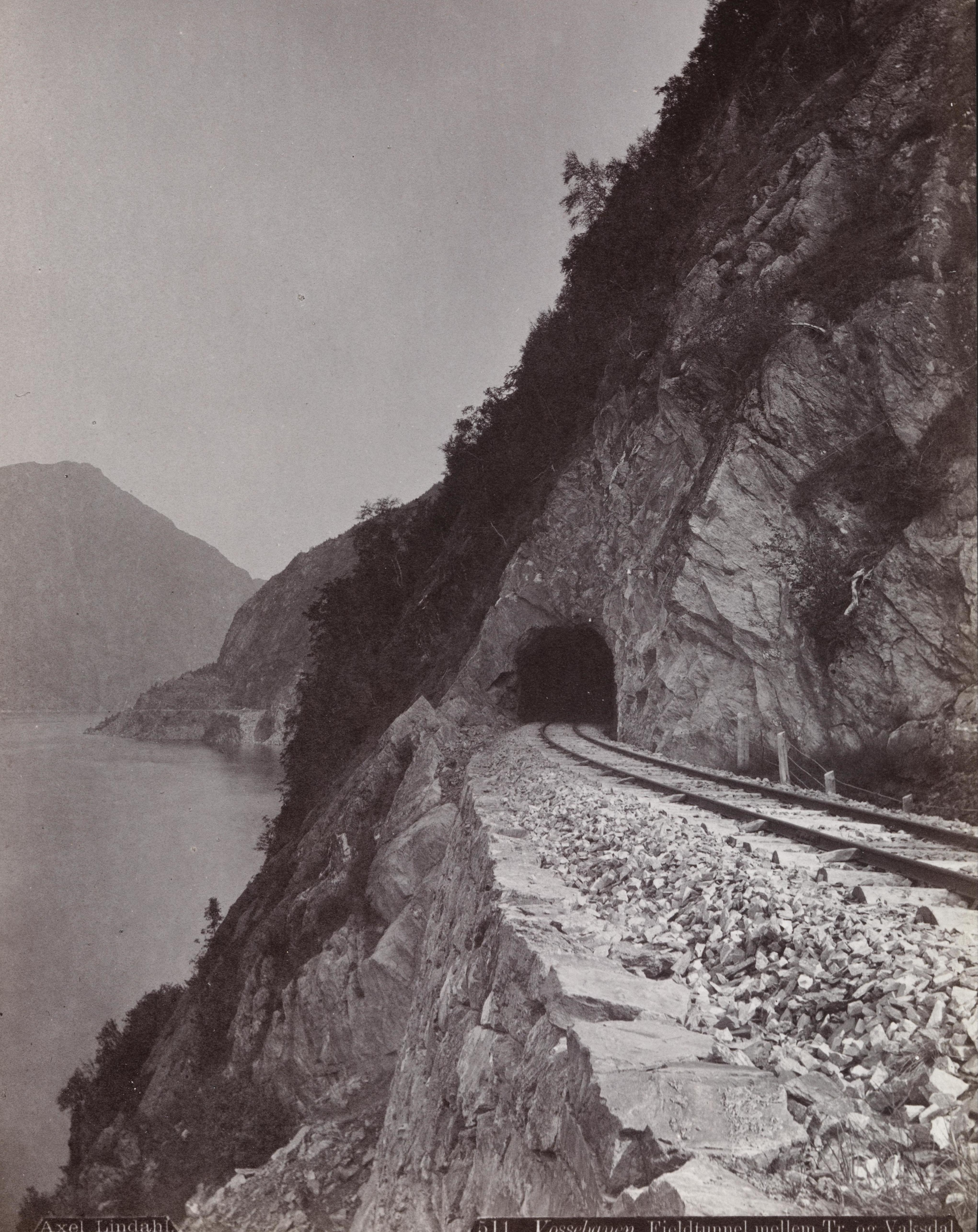
A section of Bergen-Voss-line between Vaksdal and Trengereid before 1890.

By 1873, an agreement had been reached as to the right-of-way to Voss, but not onwards towards Oslo. On 13 January 1874, the Bergen city council started issuing stock for the Voss Line, to begin with 400,000 Norwegian speciedaler (NOK 1.6 million) were issued. In the 1873 parliamentary election the railway supporter Peter Jebsen was elected, spending the next few years furiously defending the railway. Parliament chose to not issue new railway projects in the 1874 session, and instead adopt a complete plan for all railway construction in the country—to be proposed by a committee. When the committee reported on 20 March 1875, the Voss Line was not included since it could not show a higher profitability than 1%. During the 1875 session there was not a majority for the Voss Line, partially due to the lack of capital available from local investors. This was based on a claim from Johan Jørgen Schwartz, the chairman of the committee, that the investment costs were underestimated. This was countered by Nils Henrik Bruun, a constructor from Bergen, who was willing to construct all tunnels on the railway for less than the budgeted sum. When Jebsen in addition was willing to act as personal guarantee for Bruun in case of his death, the majority in the parliament shifted. On 9 June 1875 parliament voted with 61 against 42 to build the Voss Line.

==== Construction ====
The Voss Line was built with narrow gauge, 1,067 mm (3 ft 6 in). The first parts of the construction started in December 1875, while the largest part started in March 1876. During the winter the engineers had done the last finesses on the plans. At any given time at least 800 men worked on construction, and at the peak 1,800 men were employed. They worked 12 hours per day, for which they had a daily wage of NOK 2.55, the highest wage for navvies in the country. To a large extent the labor came from Sweden, who had just finished the Norway/Vänern Line and had an excess of skilled labor for construction. This import of labor had the effect of pumping money into the local economy, and several taverns were built along the line. There were some accidents, and several deaths among the workers.

The construction work was finished in 1882 and some test services began, though not scheduled until the spring of 1883. Official opening commenced on 11 July 1883. Many of the navvies settled on Vossebanen after construction, and started working for the Norwegian State Railways (NSB) on the operation of the line.

=== Construction of the Bergen Line ===
The Bergen Line

By the time the Voss Line was completed Norway had entered a recession. Parliament was not willing to give more money to railways, and the country had to make do with a transport plan launched in 1886 that did not follow up with any funding. On 1 March 1894 parliament after five days of debate chose, with 60 against 53 votes, to build the Bergen Line. Several different routes had been proposed, including over Krøderen, or down Numedal (where the Numedal Line would later be built). In the end Hallingdal was chosen, connecting to Hønefoss and on to Oslo via Sandvika. To save costs a preliminary line would connect Hønefoss to Roa with the branch Roa–Hønefoss Line. The final line would run along the Gjøvik Line to Oslo. The line would also connect to the rest of the network via the Randsfjorden Line at Hønefoss.

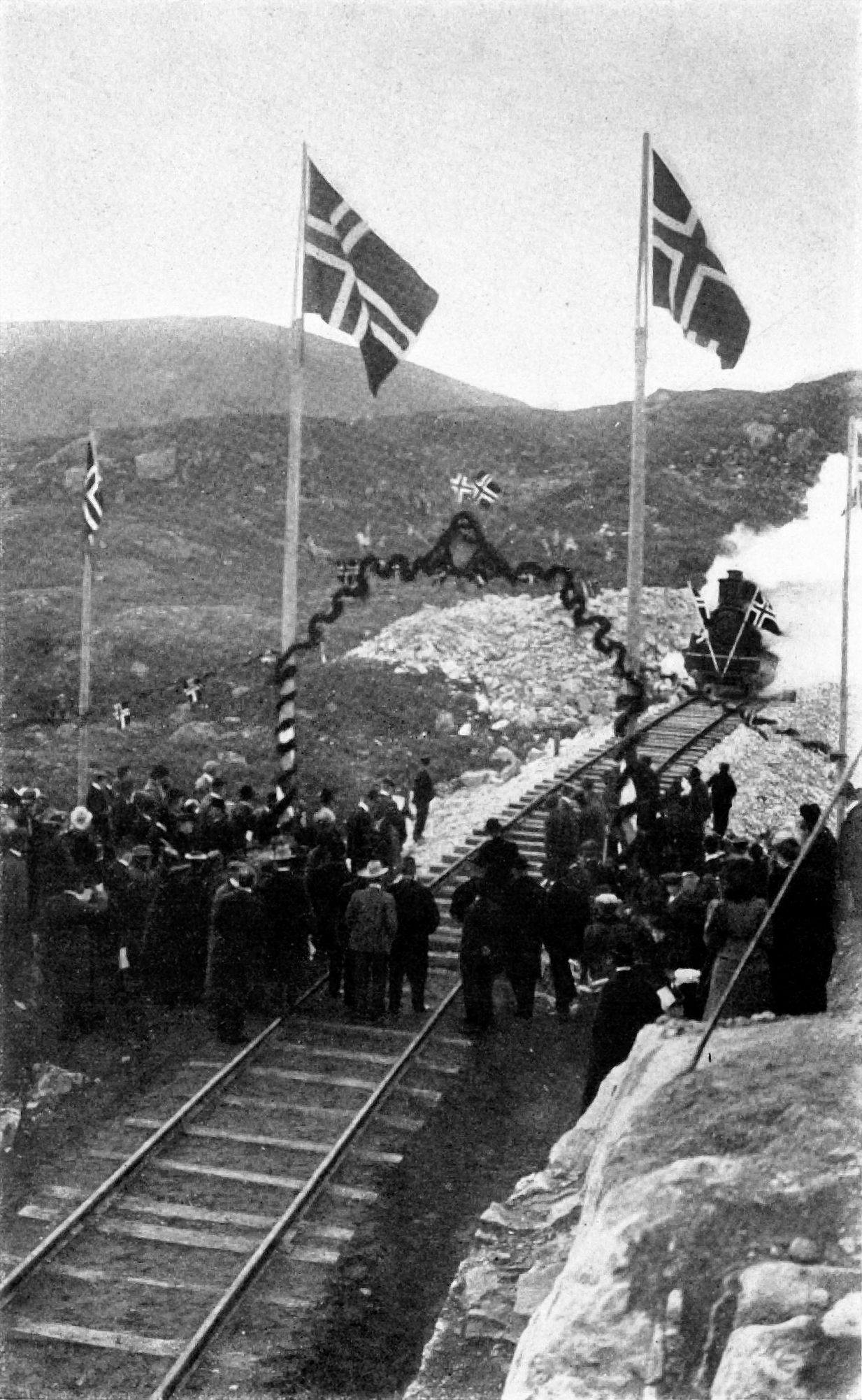
The ceremony at the completion of the track at Ustaoset in 1907.

Local financing was ready within a year, yet it took six years to survey the line properly, and construction start had to wait until 1901. Construction started with the building of roads to get in supplies to the construction sites, completed in 1902. The construction was exceptionally challenging, taking place at high altitudes in a region without roads and with a climate that saw many metres of snow in the winter and temperatures far below freezing. 113 tunnels, totaling 28 kilometres (17 mi) had to be built; the longest, the 5,311-metre (17,425 ft) Gravehalsen Tunnel, alone costing NOK 3 million and was the longest tunnel north of the Alps. It took six years to build, and had to be excavated manually through solid gneiss. Laying of track was started in 1906, and in 1907 the two groups, both having started at their own end, met at Ustaoset. A small celebration was held at the spot (see image).

It had been decided that the Bergen Line, unlike the Voss Line, was to be built with standard gauge. So, the newly laid line from Bergen to Voss had to be converted in time for the opening of the Bergen Line. This was especially challenging because of the continuous traffic on the line, with 36 departures per day to Nesttun, six to Garnes and four to Voss. In preparation a few curves had to be straightened, the tunnels widened and the bridges strengthened. On the night of 10–11 August 1904 all the track was changed and in the morning the trains could operate on standard gauge to Voss.

The first services started on 1 July 1907 from Voss to Myrdal. An official opening train attempted to cross part of the line to Gulsvik on 9 December 1907, but got stuck in heavy snow and had to return. The railway had to close and it took one and a half months to clear it of snow. Even a rotary snowplow at 750 kW was not powerful enough to get rid of the snow. A new attempt to open the line in 1908 succeeded, and a train ran from Gulsvik to Bergen. The line from Roa to Gulsvik was still under construction, so passage was along the Drammen Line via the Krøder Line with ship over Krøderen to Gulsvik. The first scheduled train from Oslo West Station to Bergen departed on 10 June 1908.

On 25 November 1909 a train en route from Bergen rolled into Oslo Østbanestasjon, and two days later the railway was officially opened at Voss. King Haakon VII stated upon the opening that the line was the Norwegian engineering masterpiece of his generation.

Finse is now the highest point of the Norwegian Railway System, located at 1222m. above sea level.

=== World War Two ===
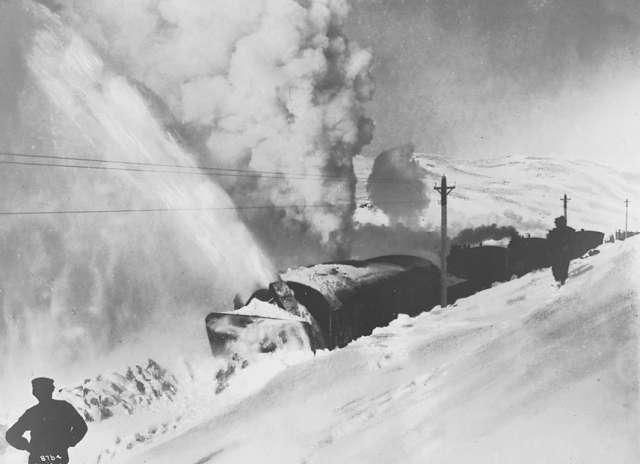
The rotary snowplow fighting its way across Hardangervidda in 1908.

In World War II, during the German occupation of Norway, it was a demanding time for the Norwegian State Railways as a whole. This railway line was also very busy. The track was in heavy use for both German military and civilian transportation, and much of the equipment and maintenance was lacking.

On 28 February 1944, a descending eastbound freight train loaded with oil and petrol lost its braking power and became a runaway train, finally ploughing into a westbound passenger train at Breifoss, just east of Geilo. The crash and subsequent fire killed 25 civilians and an unknown number of German soldiers. Poor lubrication oil combined with the cold weather is believed to have caused the accident.

=== Post-war electrification ===
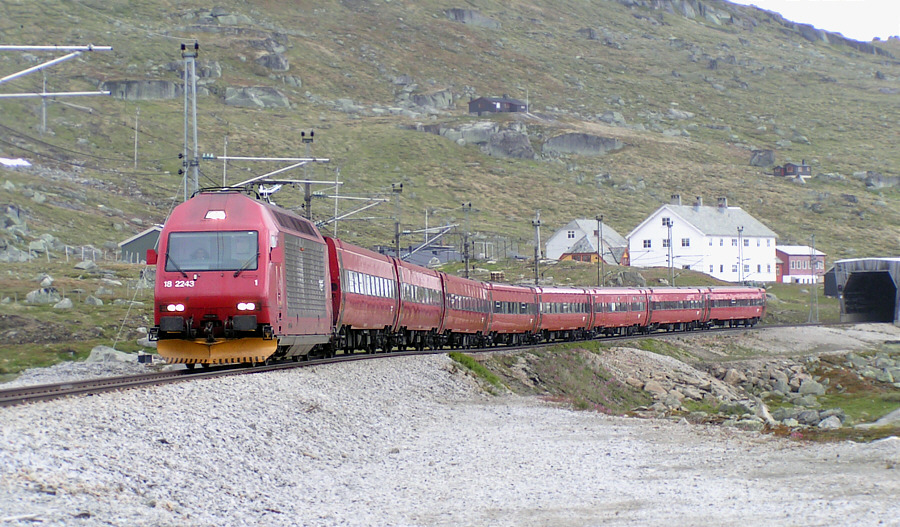
An NSB El 18 hauled express train just leaving the Finse Tunnel.

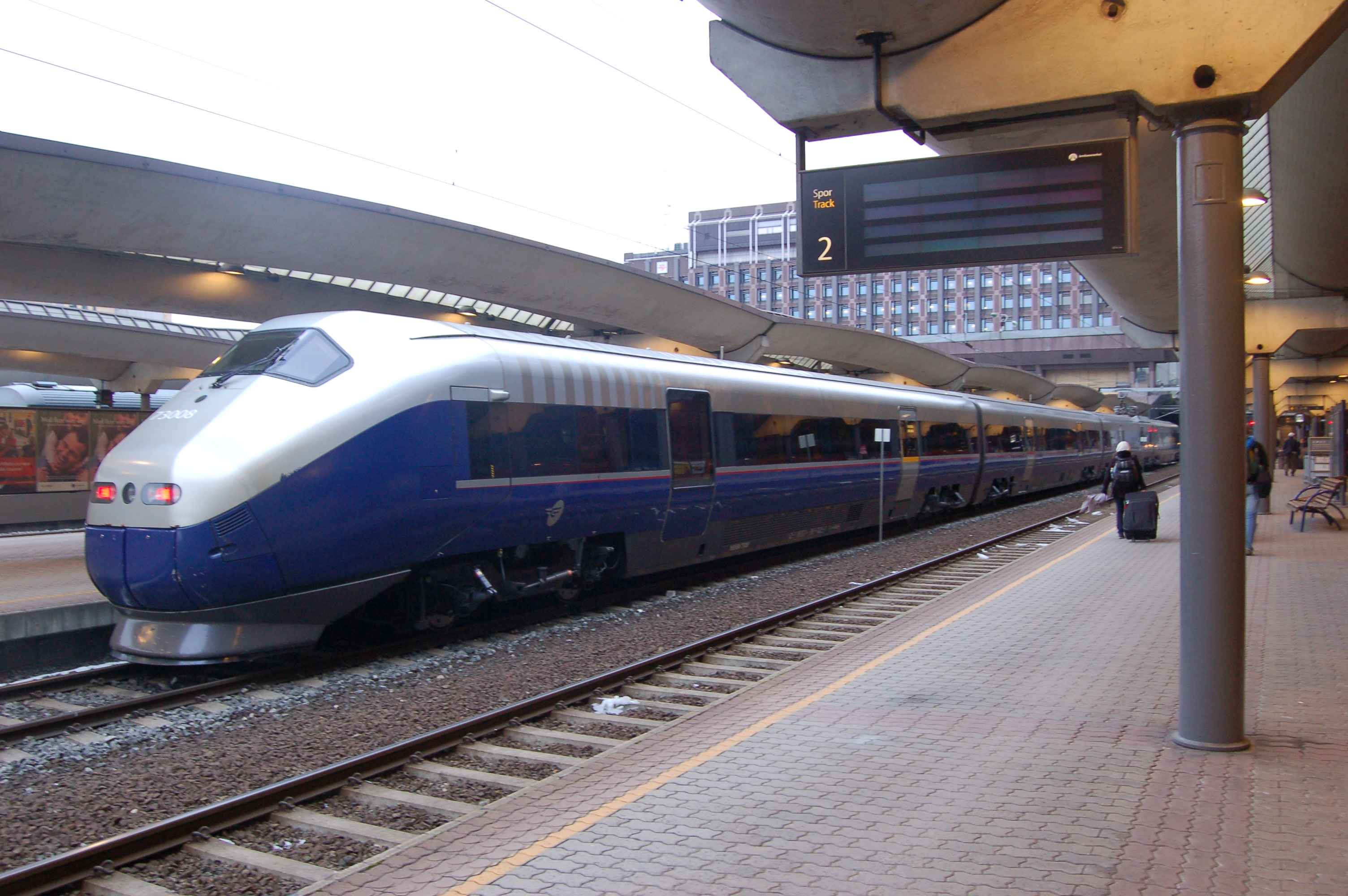
An NSB type 73 express train at Oslo S waiting for departure to Bergen.

With Norway's abundance of hydroelectricity and the high cost of importing coal to run the steam locomotives, there was considerable economic benefit to be realised by electrifying the line. Plans for the electrification of the line had existed since the line was opened. In 1912 the line from Nesttun to Bergen was proposed electrified and rebuilt to double track, following the opening of the electrified Thamshavn Line in 1908. During the planning of the Hardanger Line and the Flåm Line during the 1930s it was again proposed to electrify the line. However, although both the branch lines were built with electric traction, the main line was not. Counter-suggestions were raised proposing a conversion to the locomotives running on oil or coal dust. In 1939 a plan for national electrification was launched, and the Voss Line was top priority. But the breakout of World War II set the plans back, and not until the 1950s was it again possible to afford such investments. Vossebanen took electric traction into use on 2 July 1954. The electricity is supplied via an overhead line.

In 1952 a new plan was launched by parliament to electrify 1,153 kilometres (716 mi) of railway, with the line from Voss to Hønefoss prioritized fourth. This section of the line was considered "difficult" because of tight curves, difficult track alignment; and also that the Overhead line might be vulnerable to bad weather, particularly snow and ice. A test 16.5KV transformer was set up at Finse to see if the catenary could be kept ice-free, and it could.

The following year NSB launched the "away with the steam" campaign that would replace all steam locomotives with electric or diesel traction. Since electrification was not imminent, the NSB introduced diesel traction on the Bergen Line in 1958. The line was electrified in four stages, from Roa to Hønefoss on 1 February 1961, from Hønefoss to Ål on 1 December 1962, from Ål to Ustaoset on 15 December 1963 and finally from Ustaoset to Voss on 7 December 1964. As the point of electrification moved across the mountain, so did the point NSB changed locomotive on the train. The new locomotive El 13 was put into service on the electric parts. The electrification cost NOK 143 million.

The express trains have as one of the main lines always been allocated the newest locomotives by NSB. When the El 14 was delivered in 1968, it was put into service on Bergensbanen, as was the El 16 in 1977, the El 17 in 1981, and finally the El 18 in 1996. The older locomotives have been relegated to freight service. In 2000 electric multiple units were put into service with the Class 73 tilting trains, branded as Signatur and capable of 210 kilometres per hour (130 mph). However, they cannot be used at those speeds on any part of the Bergen Line, and only some parts of the Asker Line and around Finse can they operate quicker than the other rollingstock used. There has also been reason to doubt their winter capability on the very demanding Bergen Line. Occasionally they have been stuck in the snow, and on 21 February 2007, a multiple unit derailed after running into a pack of snow. As refurbished carriages become available, the multiple units will be removed from the line, and replaced by traditional locomotive-hauled trains.

=== Operator(s) ===
Former NSB logo (2005–2019)

==== 1883 to 1996 ====
The Norwegian State Railways (Norwegian: Norges Statsbaner or NSB), a government agency / directorate, was the state-owned railway organisation which operated the majority of the railway network in Norway between 1883 and the end of 1996.

==== 1997 to 2017 ====
On 1 December 1996, Norwegian State Railways (NSB) was demerged to create three organisations:

- the infrastructure operator Norwegian National Rail Administration;
- the Norwegian Railway Inspectorate;
- and the train operator (Norwegian: Norges Statsbaner BA) (Norwegian State Railways BA or NSB): the BA indicating a limited liability company without shares. The name and logo "NSB" continued to be used by the train operator Norges Statsbaner BA.

==== 2017 onwards ====
On 1 January 2017, as part of the railway reforms:

- the Norwegian National Rail Administration was split into Bane NOR, the government agency responsible for railway infrastructure; and the Norwegian Railway Directorate, a government agency having strategic responsibility of the railway network;
- the (Norwegian: Norges Statsbaner BA), (Norwegian State Railways BA), or NSB BA, changed from a limited liability company without shares to one that had shares, so the BA became an AS. The new names were: (Norwegian: Norges Statsbaner AS) or NSB AS: the AS indicating that it was now a limited company with a share holding.
- On 24 April 2019 NSB was renamed Vygruppen and rebranded as Vy.

== Infrastructure upgrades ==
=== Ulriken Tunnel ===
==== The "old" 1960s tunnel ====
In September 1954, Rieber suggested a package for the politicians, where he would create a company that would borrow money to build both the Ulriken Tunnel, a shortening of the line from Hønefoss to Sandvika (the "proposed" Ringerike Line) and electrify the railway. This would save 64 kilometres (40 mi). Since NSB based their fares on the route length travelled, financing would be covered by a surcharge equal to the distance saved; ticket price would remain the same and within twenty years the debt would be covered. The government opposed the suggestion — the newspaper editor and Norwegian Labour Party politician Trygve Bratteli commenting that even though the financing was private, it would still have to use the same funding as government debt, and would jeopardize other projects, like the Nordland Line.

Shortly afterwards a revised plan, the "Little Rieberplan" was accepted. The first 32 kilometres (20 mi) of the line from Bergen to Takvam represented a very roundabout way, and it was clear that it would be possible to reduce the line by 21 kilometres (13 mi) with the construction of three single-track tunnels, Ulriken Tunnel (7,660 metres or 25,130 feet), Arnanipa Tunnel (2,177 metres or 7,142 feet) and Tunestveit Tunnel (40 metres or 130 feet). This plan was approved by parliament in 1956, based on private financing from the businessman Fritz Rieber. Construction started in 1959 with the tunnels being finished in 1963, while track laying was finished on 29 May 1964, when the first train entered the tunnel. As the new tunnel line deviated from the original line near Arna, a new Arna station had to be constructed adjacent to the tunnel mouth. This also opened in May 1964. The opening of this tunnel meant that it replaced part of the original and that part was no longer needed as a main line. It became a heritage line: the Old Voss Line (Norwegian: Gamle Vossebanen).

As of May 2nd 2024 there is double track service between Bergen central station and Arna station.

==== The second (new) tunnel bore ====
In January 2016, Norwegian National Rail Administration had plans for doubling the Ultriken tunnel, but it was abolished at the end of that year. Bane NOR who took over the responsibilities for the network, authorised its contractors to start building a second single-track tunnel through the mountain adjacent to the 1960s tunnel. It was to be constructed in a number of main contracts: the first was boring the single-bore 7.7 kilometres (4.8 mi)) tunnel, which began in January 2016, and was completed on 29 August 2017. The second was the installation of the infrastructure: installing the rails in the form of a cast fixed track; the overhead catenary; a tunnel drainage system; installing a remotely-controlled signalling system both in the tunnel and at Arna station, to replace the manually controlled system at Arna station that has been in use since 1964; and upgrading half of Arna station. The new tunnel opened on 13 December 2020 and the signalling system was linked into the train control centre in Bergen.

Because of space constraints at Arna station, due to the need to move trains between platforms within the station, the new tunnel has a double portal at Arna station and is double-tracked for a short distance, before combining into a single running track.

==== The resultant double tunnel ====
Bane NOR awarded a contract to Grupo Azvi to refurbish the old 1960s tunnel, with work due to start in February 2021 and due to finish in June 2023. The requirement is do this refurbishment without lifting the existing rail track. As part of this work it will be fire-proofed; two diagonal tunnels at the Arna end are to be blasted between the old and the new tunnels to allow trains to switch from one to the other; as well as blasting 16 other common interconnections for escape and for installing infrastructure.

Double running will only be achieved when the refurbishment of the old 1960s tunnel is complete; and the second half of Arna station, linked to the old tunnel has been rebuilt. To obtain the full benefit of this work, it is intended to double the track all the way from the tunnel to Bergen.

=== Oslo Tunnel ===
In 1980, the Oslo Tunnel was opened, allowing trains along the Drammen Line to go to the new Oslo Central Station, an upgrade of the former Oslo Ø. As a consequence of this, passenger trains were since the late 1980s rerouted via Drammen instead of via Roa, following the Drammen Line and the Randsfjord Line to Hønefoss. This allows the trains to pass through more densely populated areas and on trackage with more capacity. However, the change of route actually increased the length between the two termini by 23 kilometres (14 mi). But the better track standard via Drammen results in about the same travel time. Freight trains still goes via Roa.

=== Finse Tunnel ===
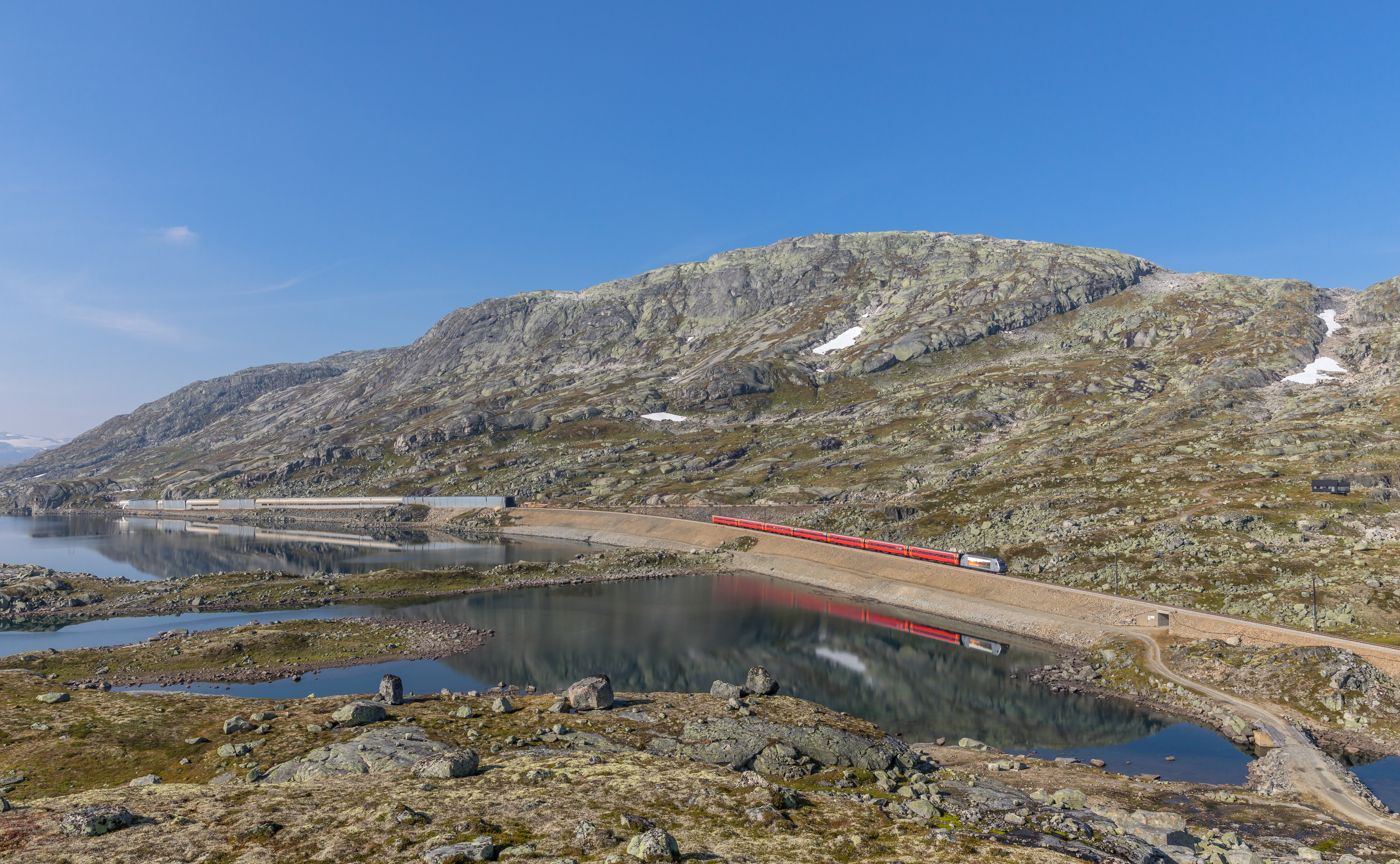
Hallingskeid

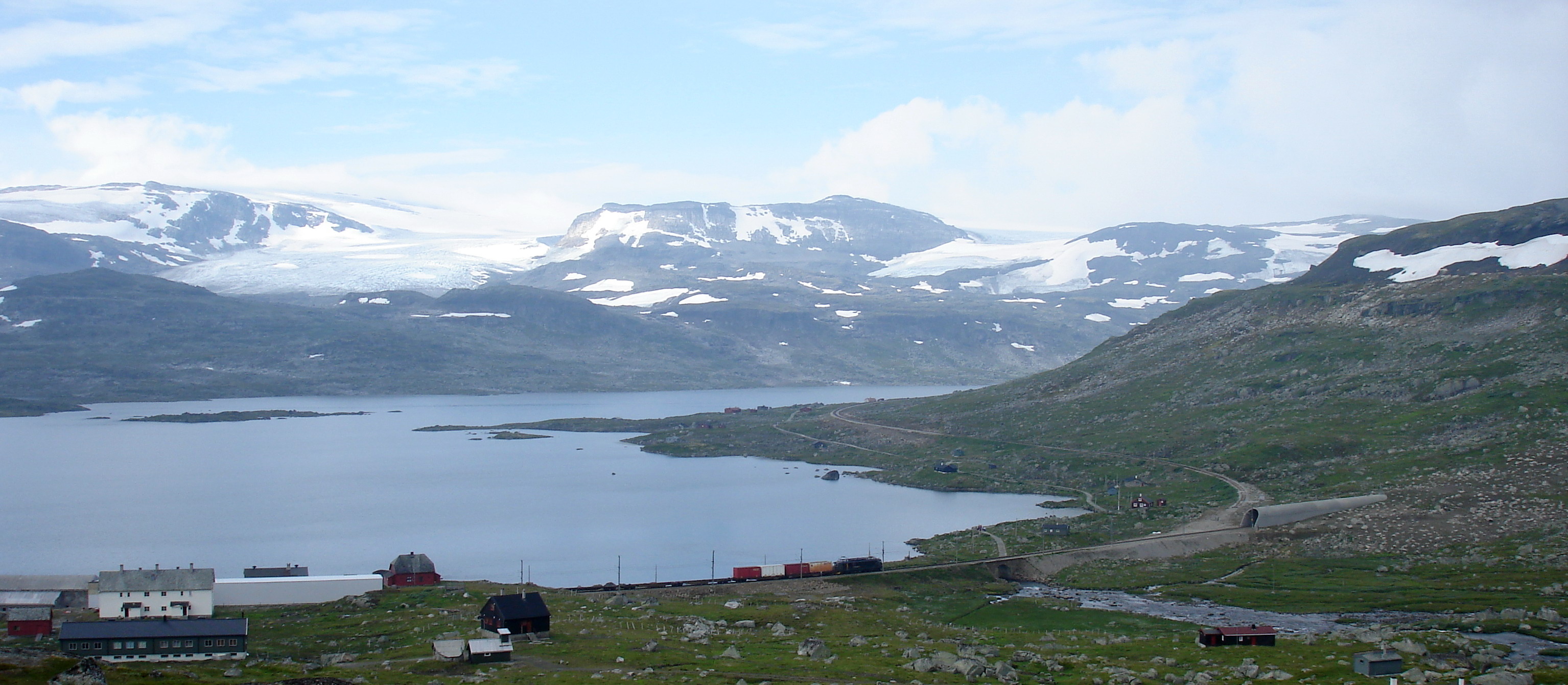
Freight train about to enter the Finse tunnel

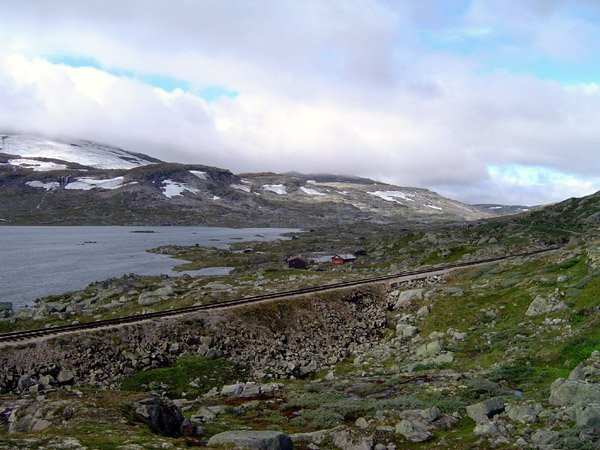
Abandoned section of the line through Hardangervidda near Finse

During winter NSB had large costs keeping the line snow-free. Large diesel-electric snowploughs were stationed at Finse, and tens of kilometers of snow sheds were built on the most vulnerable parts. Especially the 22 kilometres (14 mi) part between Finse Station and Hallingskeid was a drain on resources, and heavy snowfall and drifts regularly closed the entire line. A solution was proposed by NSB's director Robert Nordén in 1984, involving construction of a 10.5 kilometres (6.5 mi) tunnel between the two stations. In the tunnel there had to be a 900 metres (3,000 ft) long passing loop, to ensure even distances between passing loops along the line.

In 1989 the Parliament of Norway approved the plans, including the upgrade of part of the line east of Finse. In total NOK 750 million was invested in rebuilding 32 kilometres (20 mi) of line, shortening it by 4.5 kilometres (2.8 mi). At the same time the permitted speed could be increased from 70 kilometres per hour (43 mph) to 160 kilometres per hour (99 mph). The tunnel opened on 16 June 1992 while the rest of the upgrades opened in five steps between 1995 and 1998. The highest point on the line, previously at 1,301 metres (4,268 ft), became 1,237 metres (4,058 ft)—located inside the tunnel. After the tunnel opened, the Finse snow removal facility was closed.

=== Hallingskeid Station and snow tunnels ===
Snow drifts and harsh weather (see "Construction of the Bergen Line" section above) had been a problem in the higher-altitude regions of the Bergen line: in one case causing the abandonment of an official opening in December 1909. Hallingskied station is a station built on the Hardangervidda plateau, within an area without population or road access, at an elevation of 1,110 meters (3,640 ft) above mean sea level. The station therefore serves trekkers and mountaineers.

The first station, built in the early 1900s, did not have a snow tunnel when it opened, but snow tunnels and snow fences were progressively added after the autumn of 1909 to cover the running line, the passing loop and the station itself. Part of the snow tunnel caught fire in 1948 and spread to the station; and, there was another fire in the snow tunnel in 1953. Yet another fire in 1960, this time external to the tunnel, caused the loss of the snow tunnel; the railway station, which was rebuilt in 1970; and the station hotel, which was not replaced.

On 16 June 2011, a possible welding accident may have been the "cause behind a fire" in the snow tunnel at Hallingskeid Station. The fire led to the complete destruction of all infrastructure in the snow tunnel, the twin Class 73 electric multiple unit trapped in the tunnel as the electrical supply to the catenary failed; and Telenor telephone cables and communications systems in the area. There were no injuries to the passengers, but they lost all their belongings left behind in the train. This closed the line for seven-days between Myrdal and Finse; and through traffic on the Bergen line did not reopen until the evening of 23 June 2011. The official accident report, published in May 2012 by the Norwegian Safety Investigation Authority was unable to establish a clear and demonstrable direct cause for the fire: but they stated that the highest risks were Hot work, electrical installations, or hot particles from trains.

== Operation ==
The Bergen Line as a through line is used for up to five express trains operated by Norwegian State Railways, as well as freight trains by CargoNet. From Myrdal to Bergen there are commuter rail services operated by NSB.

=== Line ===
The total distance from Oslo to Bergen via Drammen is 493 kilometres (306 mi), while the Bergen Line proper is 372 kilometres (231 mi). The line has 182 tunnels, totaling ca. 73 kilometres (45 mi), of which ten are over 2.0 kilometres (1.2 mi). Finse Station remains the highest elevated station at 1,222.2 metres (4,010 ft), while the highest point is now in the Finse Tunnel at 1,237 metres (4,058 ft).

==== Oslo – Hønefoss ====
Section Oslo – Drammen see

→ Main article: Drammenbanen

Section Drammen – Hønefoss see

→ Main article: Randsfjordbanen

==== Hønefoss – Geilo ====
Hønefoss in Storelva (Ringerike) valley is left by the line northwest into the Sogna valley, where the route uses its northern valley flanks to Sokna. To get to the Krøderen (lake) valley, Bergen Line follows Rudselva, passes by Langevannet and Breidvannet lakes and also through the 2.3 kilometer Haversting tunnel, which runs parallel to the Norwegian National Road 7, (Riksvei 7), Ørgenvik tunnel. Hallingdal valley is used as a natural corridor further north-west, mostly on the left river bank, serving the larger settlements of Flå and Nesbyen. At Svenkerud to the north of Nesbyen the valley flank is changed. Southwestbound to Gol, the ascent becomes gradually steeper in the following section to Geilo.

==== Geilo-Voss (Hardangervidda) ====
The Hardangervidda is actually crossed behind Geilo. Located in the valley of one of the two upper tributaries of Hallingdalselva, the Usteåne, the railway line runs alongside a number of smaller lakes to the culmination point near Finse. Before Finse, the 2.7 kilometer long Gråskallen tunnel at Haugastøl station is the first important improvement of the section. Immediately after the highest station Finse, the more than 10 kilometer long Finsetunnel was built, which replaced the original open route at over 1200 meters above sea level. At Høgheller junction, the new line merges back into the original road, which runs along the northern flank of the Moldåtal with numerous enclosures. After bridging the river and thus changing the traveled on side of the valley, the route passes by Seltuftvatnet and Reinungavatnet lakes. Behind that, Myrdal and Flåmsbana is reached.

With the following Gravhals tunnel, more than five kilometers long, the mountain massif to the catchment area of the Vosso is pierced: Now the railway line, built partly high on the northern flanks of the valleys, uses the merging upper valleys of the Uppsetf, the Kleielva and the Raundalselva westwards until lake Vangsvatnet in Voss Municipality is reached.

==== Voss mountains ====
From here, the Vosso valley corridor is used on its northern flank as far as Bulken station. At Bolstadøyri, where the Atlantic Ocean is reached by its branch Bolstadfjord, the route crosses over to the southern valley flank. With the more than eight kilometer long Trollkona Tunnel, opened in 1987, the route reaches lower Bergsdal and Dale (Vaksdal). Trollkona had become necessary due to the expansion of the European route E16 (main road connection between Oslo and Bergen) alongside the Bolstadfjord using partly the old railway line substructure. South of Dale, at Stanghelle, the Veafjord, which merges into the Sørfjord (Osterøy), is reached. On its south-east bank, the route to Herland passes by the Osterøy Bridge. Worth mentioning is the six kilometer long Hananipa tunnel between Vaksdal and Trengereid, which was put into operation in 1970 as line improvement. The 2.2 kilometer long Arnanipa tunnel is located behind Herland, immediately followed by the 7.6 kilometer long Ulriken Tunnel, by which the original, much longer, route via Nesttun could be shortened in 1964. Having reached the urban area of Bergen, the route follows a short part of the old line to the Bergen terminus.

=== Commuter rail ===
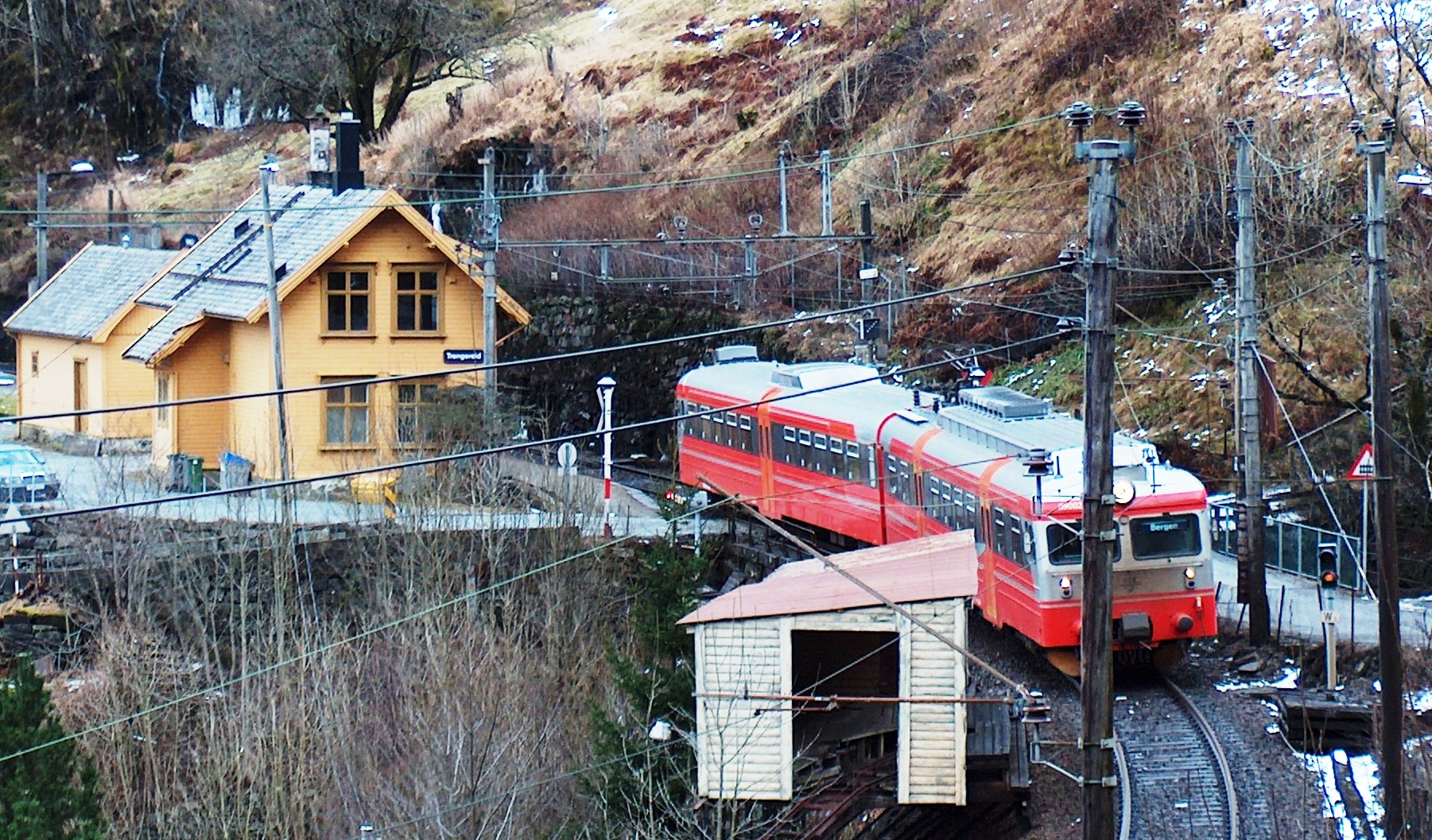
An NSB type 69 passing Trengereid Station

Vy Tog operates a commuter rail service from Bergen with two hourly departures to Arna, plus fourteen daily departures to Voss, of which up to six continue to Myrdal. The entire rolling stock is from 2019 consisting of Stadler FLIRT Electric multiple units after a process of which led to phasing out the old NSB Class 69. The first part to Arna represents an important part of the public transport in Bergen, since the rail direct line through the mountain Ulriken is considerably faster than driving over and around.

=== Express service ===
Express trains operated by NSB have always been the primary passenger service on Bergensbanen. Passenger trains follow the Drammen Line and the Asker Line to Drammen, before heading north to Hønefoss on the Randsfjord Line. The express trains offer both transport from villages along the line to either Bergen or Oslo, as well travel between Norway's two largest cities. Expresses are locomotive-hauled trains with modernized coaches. Six nights a week there is a night train service. Several parts of the line service places without road access, such as Finse and Myrdal. Operating deficits are covered by the Norwegian Ministry of Transport and Communications. In 2018 the fastest line used 6 hours and 32 minutes from Oslo to Bergen.

=== Freight ===
Freight trains are operated by CargoNet, hauled by El 14 and El 16 locomotives. Most transport is from the terminal at Alnabru in Oslo to the terminal at Bergen Station. Freight trains use the Roa-Hønefoss Line instead of going via Drammen since it is shorter—distance is more important than speed for freight trains. CargoNet operates up to four daily trains from Oslo, plus one from Drammen. Rail freight on (the Bergensbanen), the Bergen line, increased by 80% from 2001 to 2005, but further growth is not possible without better infrastructure. In 2006, CargoNet indicated they wanted five more passing loops, as well as lengthening them to increase freight train length from 400 metres (1,300 ft) to 600 metres (2,000 ft), claiming they could double freight traffic with adequate infrastructure.

=== Heritage ===
Parts of the closed sections of Vossebanen, from Midttun to Garnes have been converted to a heritage railway—the Old Voss Line—that is operated with steam trains by the Norwegian Railway Club during the summer. At Finse there is a navvy museum, and the old navvy road has become a cycle track.

The branch Flåm Line has been converted to a tourist route. The railway has spectacular scenery and a vertical descent of 864 metres (2,835 ft) or 5.5% along the 20 kilometres (12 mi) route from Myrdal to Flåm. Passenger services are provided by Vy, but marketing is performed by Flåm Utvikling. The stock used on the railway are El 18 hauling NSB B3 wagons, the latter all painted green.

== Future propositions ==
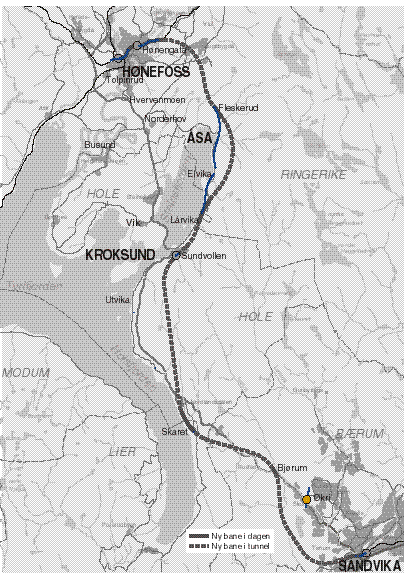
Map of the proposed Ringeriksbanen that would shorten Bergensbanen by 60 km.

=== A call for more investment in railways ===
In 2002 the Norwegian National Rail Administration warned that lack of funding might lead to a closure of all long-distance passenger trains in Norway, including the Bergen Line. Torild Skogsholm, Minister of Transport and Communications assured that it was not the government's policy to close railway lines. In 2004 the Progress Party suggested closing down the railway line and replacing it with a motorway between Bergen and Oslo, arguing that the railway was unprofitable, and that bus transport was cheaper while easier truck transport would aid business. Other political parties rejected the proposal pointing out the better environmental performance of the railway and that the railway transports large volumes of freight.

=== Upgrades ===
The original plans for Bergensbanen from 1894 included the construction of a new line—the Ringerike Line—from Hønefoss to Sandvika just west of Oslo. This line would reduce the distance on Bergensbanen by 60 kilometres (37 mi) and 50 minutes travel time. There has been a continual decision to build this railway line, but it has never received any funding. These plans were discussed more after 2000, and a detailed plan has been done. Combined with other improvements totaling investments of NOK 7 billion, travel time could be reduced to four and a half hours. The project is scheduled to be started in 2024, and finished around 2030, now at a cost of 36 billion NOK including 20 km motorway.

==== Arne-Stanghelle Joint Project ====
In January 2025, a contract was put out to tender for a project constructing a series of new rail and road tunnels near the western end of the line. Starting 8 kilometres (5.0 mi) north-east of Bergen at Arna, the proposed route continues through a newly constructed station at Vaksdal, to finally rejoin the existing alignment at Stanghelle. The project would bypass the existing stretch of winding single-track rail skirting the South-Eastern shore of Veafjorden, with around 30 kilometres (19 mi) of new double-track rail and parallel road tunnels. The new tunnel would support train speed up to 200 km/h, reducing travel time between Arna and Stanghelle stations from an average of 28 minutes to under 14 minutes. The Arne-Stanghelle Joint Project is funded by Bane NOR and the Norwegian Public Roads Administration as part of the 2025-2036 Norwegian National Transport Plan, and is projected to take 12 to 14 years to complete, with an initial forecast budget of 40 billion kroner.

=== High-speed rail ===
Several suggestions for high-speed rail from Oslo to Bergen have been launched. Preliminary studies performed for the National Rail Administration suggested a positive cost-benefit ratios on building high-speed rail from Oslo to Bergen. The most suitable route would approximately follow the existing route (but with a new tunnel Oslo–Hønefoss). Oslo–Trondheim and Oslo–Halden are assumed to be built earlier because of lower cost. Two lobbyist suggestions to the route have also been launched. The one involves a "high-speed ring" from Oslo, via Numedal to Geilo, then following Bergensbanen to Bergen and continuing south to Stavanger and back to Oslo via Kristiansand. Norsk Bane has launched the idea of building a common line from Oslo to Haukeli and then branching off to Bergen and Stavanger.

Such long-distance high-speed railways are not included in the preliminary long-term plan for 2010–2040, and it is likely that railways Hamar–Trondheim and Drammen–Kristansand will be built first since they are easier to build. It is likely that a high-speed railway to Bergen will be built sometime in the period 2030–2060.

== Stations between Oslo and Bergen ==
=== Line gradients ===
This image gives a graphical illustration of the gradient of the line, with both Oslo and Bergen at, or very close to, sea level; and the highest point on the line being near to Finse, at or above 1,222 metres (height above sea level).

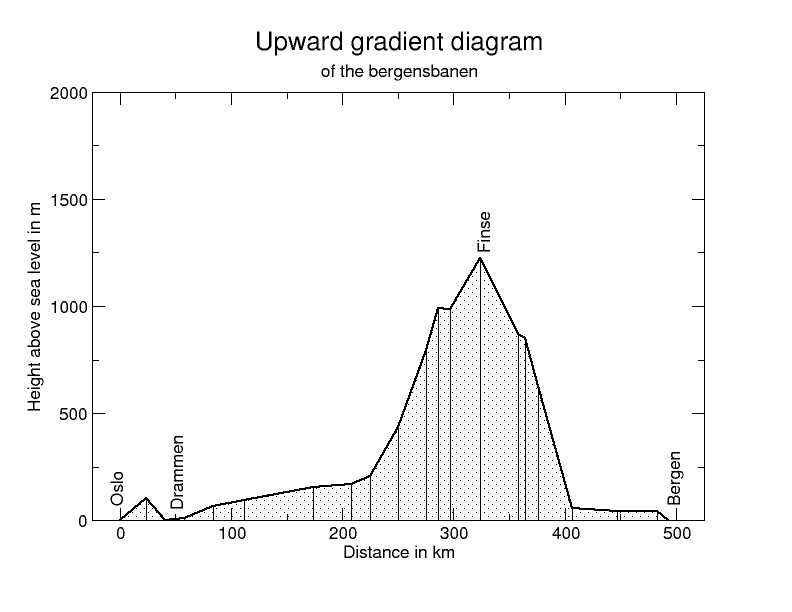
Upward gradients between Oslo and Bergen

=== Stations on the line ===
Station	Elevation (m)	Distance from Oslo (km)	Distance from Bergen (km)
Oslo S	2	0	493
Asker	104	24	469
Drammen	2	41	452
Hokksund	8	58	435
Vikersund	67	84	409
Hønefoss	96	112	381
Flå	155	174	319
Nesbyen	168	208	285
Gol	207	225	268
Ål	436	250	243
Geilo	794	275	218
Ustaoset	990	286	207
Haugastøl	988	297	196
Finse	1222	324	169
Hallingskeid	1110	345	148
Myrdal	867	358	135
Upsete	850	364	129
Mjølfjell	627	376	117
Voss	57	407	86
Dale	43	447	46
Arna	8	483	10
Bergen	2	493	0

== See also ==
- List of highest railways in Europe
