= Kristofer =

Kristofer is a masculine first name. It is a variant of the name Christopher.

== People ==
=== Kristofer ===
Notable people with the name Kristofer include:

- Kristofer Åström, Swedish singer-songwriter
- Kristofer Berglund (born 1988), Swedish professional ice hockey player
- Kristofer Blindheim Grønskag (born 1984), Norwegian playwright
- Kristofer Harris, English record producer, mixer and writer
- Kristofer Hansteen (1865–1906), Norwegian anarchist
- Kristofer Helgen (born 1980), American zoologist
- Kristofer Hivju (born 1978), Norwegian actor, producer, and writer
- Kristofer Hill (born 1979), American musician, composer, and singer-songwriter
- Kristofer Hjeltnes (disambiguation), various people
- Kristofer Johansson (born 1988), Swedish wrestler
- Kristofer Käit (born 2005), Estonian footballer
- Kristofer Karlsson (born 1992), Australian team handball player
- Kristofer Lamos (born 1974), German high jumper
- Kristofer Lange (1886–1977), Norwegian architect
- Kristofer Leirdal (1915–2010), Norwegian sculptor and art educator
- Kristofer Martin (born 1994), Filipino voice actor
- Kristofer McNeeley (born 1974), American actor
- Kristofer Myhre (1856–1945), Norwegian businessperson
- Kristofer Pister, professor of electrical engineering and computer science; founder and CTO of Dust Networks
- Kristofer Randers (1851–1917), Norwegian author and civil servant
- Kristofer Schaff (born 1992), American archer
- Kristofer Schipper (1934–2021), Dutch sinologist
- Kristofer Siimar (born 1998), Estonian tennis player
- Kristofer Sinding-Larsen (1873–1948), Norwegian painter
- Kristofer Steen (born 1974), Swedish musician and guitarist for hardcore/punk band Refused
- Kristofer Stivenson (born 1964), Greek swimmer
- Kristofer Uppdal (1878–1961), Norwegian poet and author

=== Kristófer ===
Kristófer is an Icelandic masculine first name. Notable people with the name Kristófer include:

- Kristófer Acox (born 1993), Icelandic basketball player
- Kristófer Kristinsson (born 1999), Icelandic professional footballer
