= Ulvik =

Ulvik may refer to:

== Places ==
- Ulvik Municipality, a municipality in Vestland county, Norway
- Ulvik (village), a village within Ulvik Municipality in Vestland county, Norway
- Ulvik Church, a church in Ulvik Municipality in Vestland county, Norway
- Ulvik Fjord, a fjord in Ulvik Municipality in Vestland county, Norway
