= Eidfjord =

Eidfjord may refer to:

== Places ==
- Eidfjord Municipality, a municipality in Vestland county, Norway
- Eidfjord (village), a village within Eidfjord Municipality in Vestland county, Norway
- Eid Fjord, a fjord in Eidfjord Municipality in Vestland county, Norway
- Lake Eidfjord, or Eidfjordvatnet, a lake in Eidfjord Municipality in Vestland county, Norway
- Eidfjord Church, a church in Eidfjord Municipality in Vestland county, Norway
- Old Eidfjord Church, a historic church in Eidfjord Municipality in Vestland county, Norway

== See also ==
- Eidsfjord
