= Kristofer Hjeltnes =

Kristofer Hjeltnes may refer to:

- Kristofer Kristofersson Hjeltnes (1856–1930), Norwegian horticulturist and politician
- Kristofer Sjursson Hjeltnes (1730–1804), Norwegian farmer and businessman
