= McAneeley =

McAneeley is a surname. Notable people with the surname include:

- Bob McAneeley (born 1950), Canadian ice hockey player
- Ted McAneeley (born 1950), Canadian ice hockey player

== See also ==
- McNeeley
