= Ulvik Municipality =

Municipality in Vestland, Norway

Ulvik Municipality Ulvik herad
- Municipality
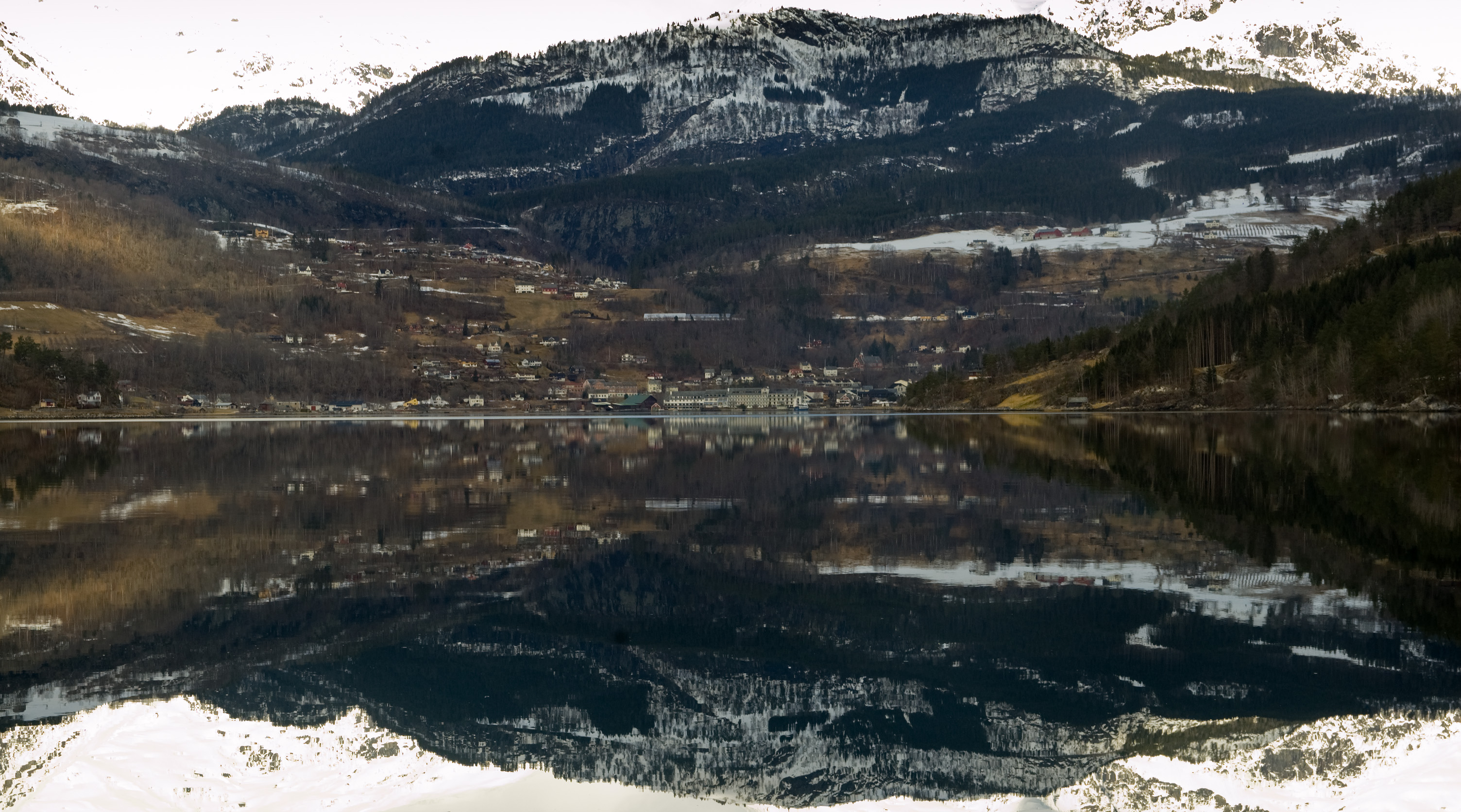
- View of the Ulvik area

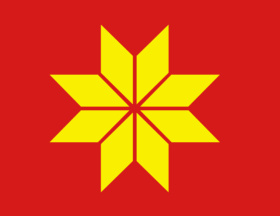
- Flag Coat of arms

- Vestland within Norway

- Ulvik within Vestland
- Coordinates: 60°37′16″N 07°04′49″E
- Country: Norway
- County: Vestland
- District: Hardanger
- Established: 1 Jan 1838
  - Created as: Formannskapsdistrikt
- Administrative centre: Ulvik

Government
  - Mayor (2023): Jens Olav Holven (Sp)

Area
  - Total: 722 km^{2} (279 sq mi)
  - Land: 663.07 km^{2} (256.01 sq mi)
  - Water: 58.93 km^{2} (22.75 sq mi) 8.2%
  - Rank: #158 in Norway
- Highest elevation: 1,860.95 m (6,105.5 ft)

Population (2025)
  - Total: 1,100
  - Rank: #328 in Norway
  - Density: 1.5/km^{2} (3.9/sq mi)
  - Change (10 years): ▼ −0.5%
- Demonym: Ulvikje

Official language
  - Norwegian form: Nynorsk
- Time zone: UTC+01:00 (CET)
  - Summer (DST): UTC+02:00 (CEST)
- ISO 3166 code: NO-4620
- Website: Official website

Ulvik is a municipality in Vestland county, Norway. It is located in the traditional district of Hardanger. The municipality stretches from the Hardangerfjord to the mountains that reach 1,800 metres (5,900 ft) above sea level. The administrative centre of the municipality is the village of Ulvik. The villages of Osa and Finse are also located in Ulvik Municipality.

The 722-square-kilometre (279 sq mi) municipality is the 158th largest by area out of the 357 municipalities in Norway. Ulvik Municipality is the 328th most populous municipality in Norway with a population of 1,100. The municipality's population density is 1.5 inhabitants per square kilometre (3.9/sq mi) and its population has decreased by 0.5% over the previous 10-year period. Of the municipality's total population, nearly half live in the village of Ulvik at the end of the Ulvikafjorden. The vast majority of those who do not live in the village of Ulvik live on the farms surrounding the village or at the end of the Osa Fjord in the village of Osa.

== General information ==
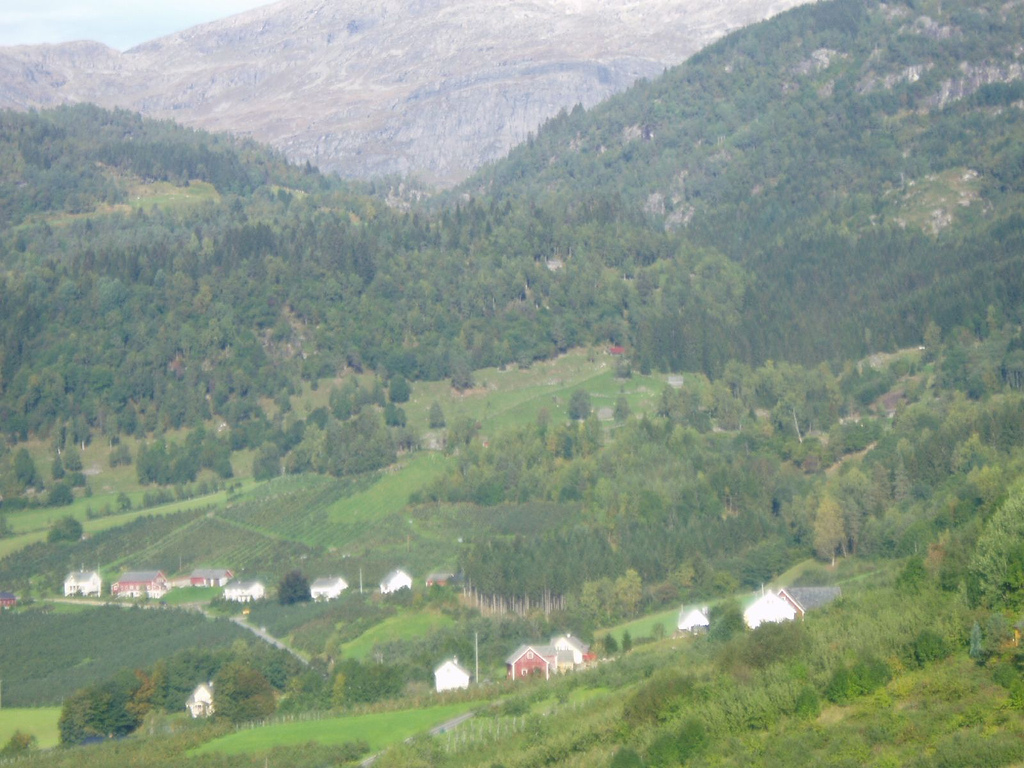
View of Torblå and Lekve

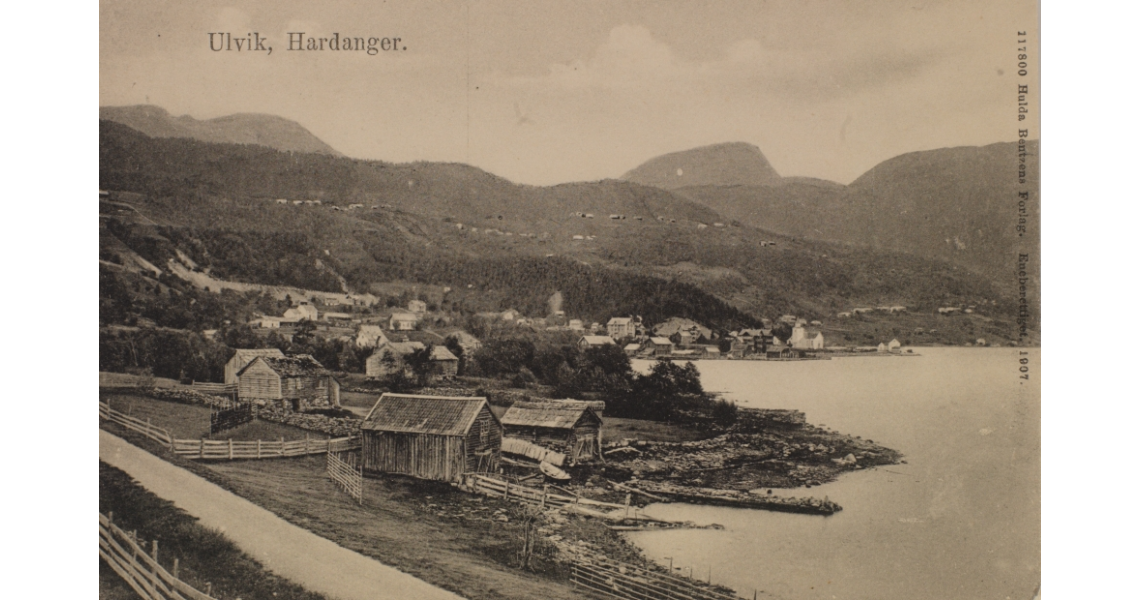
1907 postcard of Ulvik by Hulda Marie Bentzen

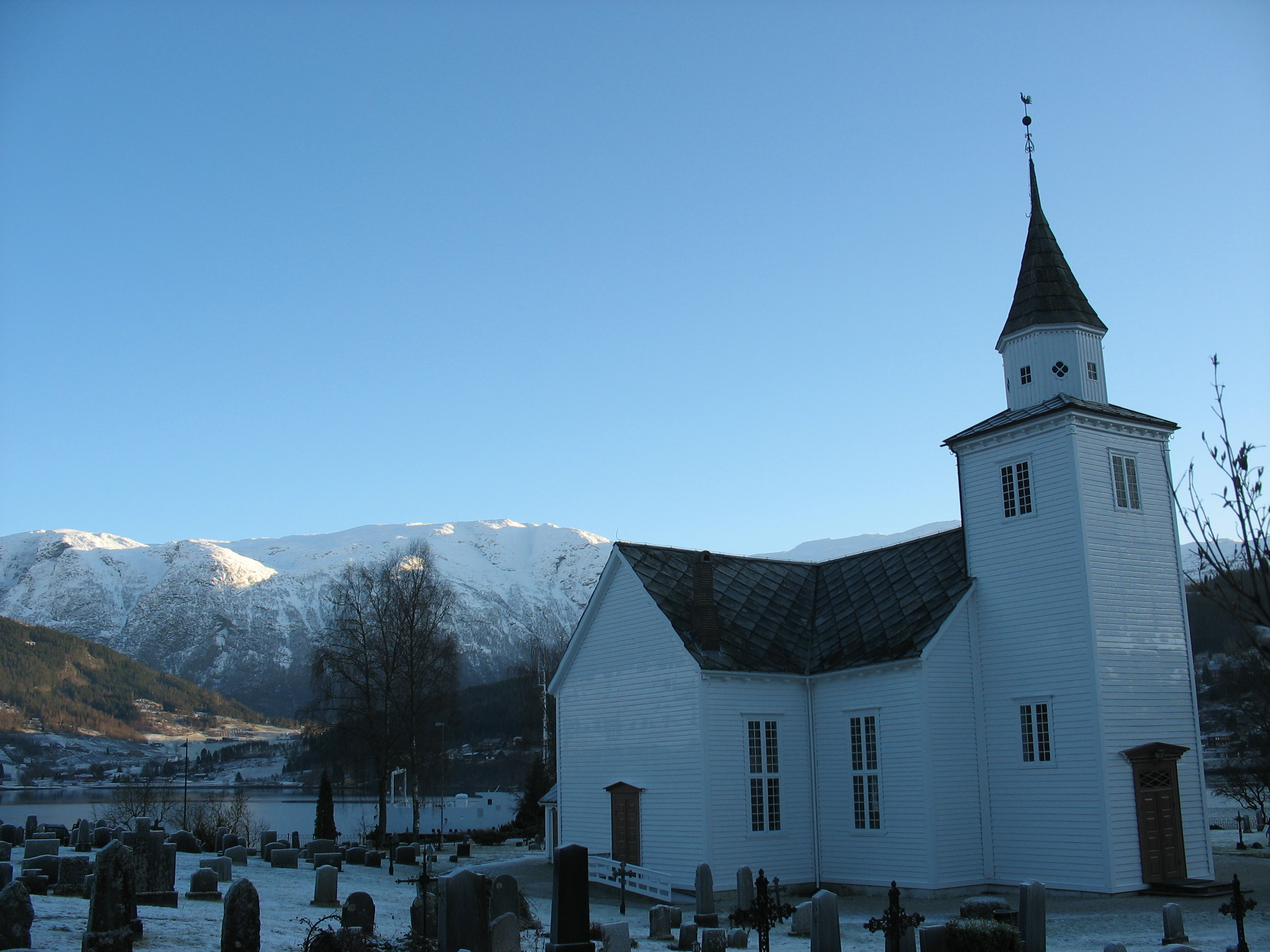
View of Ulvik Church

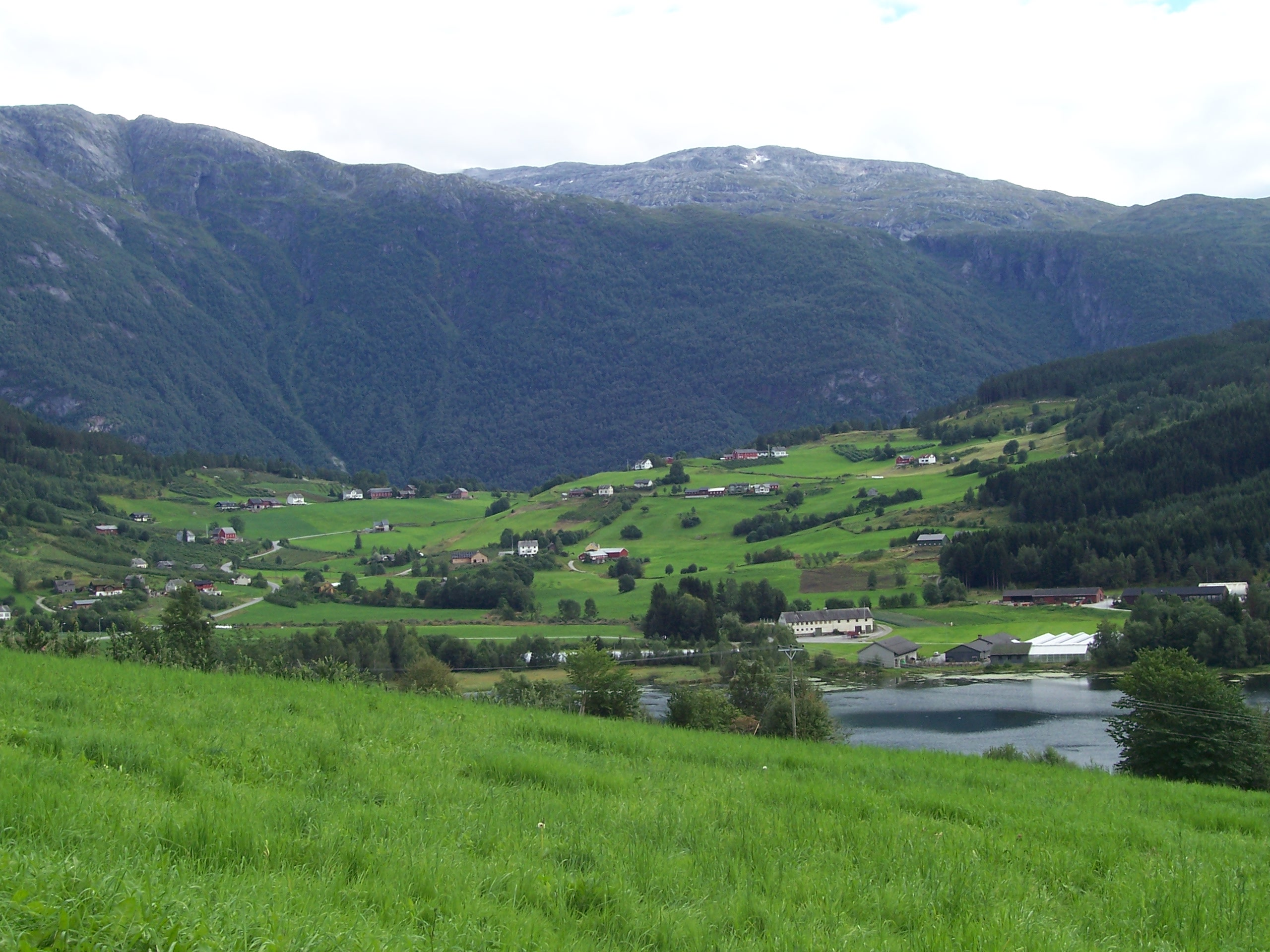
View of the village of Ulvik and surrounding area

The large parish of Graven (later spelled Granvin) was established as a municipality on 1 January 1838 (see formannskapsdistrikt law). This large municipality/parish included two annexes: Ulvik and Eidfjord. On 1 January 1859, Ulvik Church became the main parish church, which in turn made Graven Church and Eidfjord Church annexes to the main Ulvik Church. Due to this change, the name of the large municipality was changed from Graven Municipality to Ulvik Municipality.

On 1 May 1891, the large Ulvik Municipality was divided as follows:

- the western annex of Graven (population: 1,331) became the new Graven Municipality (bringing back the old name of Ulvik Municipality)
- the southeastern annex of Eidfjord (population: 1,018) became the new Eidfjord Municipality
- the main parish of Ulvik (population: 1,410) remained as a much smaller Ulvik Municipality.

In 1895, a small area of Eidfjord Municipality (population: 3) was transferred to Ulvik Municipality.

=== Name ===
The municipality (originally the parish) is named after the old Ulvik farm (Old Norse: Ulfvík) since the first Ulvik Church was built there. The first element is ulfr which means "wolf". The last element is vík which means "bay", "cove, or "wick".

Ulvik Municipality (Norwegian: Ulvik herad) is one of only three municipalities in Norway that uses the word herad instead of kommune in its name. Both Norwegian words can be translated to be "municipality", but herad is an older word that historically was only used for rural municipalities. Municipalities can choose to use one or the other, but most use the more modern kommune. From 1838 until the mid-20th century, most municipalities used herad or herred (using the Nynorsk or Bokmål spelling) for their name, but after some legal changes in the law on municipalities in the 1950s and onwards, most municipalities switched to kommune. The only other municipalities to use herad in 2026 are Voss Municipality and Kvam Municipality. There are also a few municipalities with herad in the name such as Kvinnherad Municipality.

=== Coat of arms ===
The coat of arms was granted on 19 December 1986. The official blazon is "Gules, eight lozenges in annulet Or" (Norwegian: På raud grunn åtte gule spissruter i rosett). This means the arms have a red field (background) and the charge is a set of eight lozenges arranged around a point, making a symmetrical rosette design. The charge has a tincture of Or which means it is commonly colored yellow, but if it is made out of metal, then gold is used. The figure is a traditional design seen in the local folk-art and in local textiles (including in the bunad of Ulvik). The pattern can be traced in local arts as far back as the 16th century, and is similar to the selburose. The arms were designed by Stein Davidsen. The municipal flag has the same design as the coat of arms.

=== Churches ===
The Church of Norway has one parish (sokn) within Ulvik Municipality. It is part of the Hardanger og Voss prosti (deanery) in the Diocese of Bjørgvin.

Churches in Ulvik Municipality
Parish (sokn)	Church name	Location of the church	Year built
Ulvik	Ulvik Church	Ulvik	1859

== Geography ==
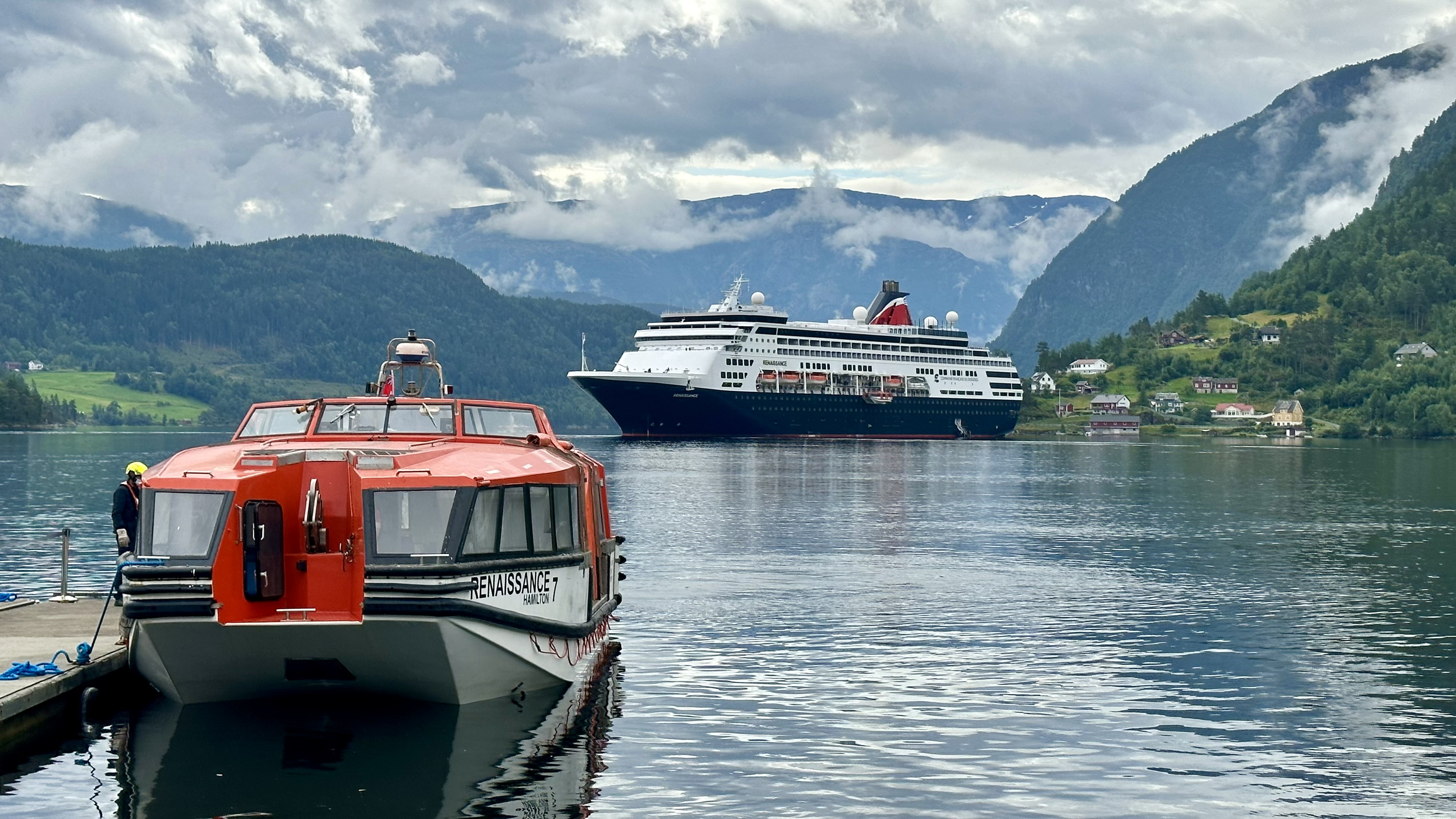

The municipality is situated around the Hardangerfjord's northeastern arms: the Osafjorden and Ulvikafjorden, extending far into the Hardangervidda plateau. The northernmost part of the Hardangerjøkulen glacier is in Ulvik Municipality. The Finse and Hallingskeid areas lie just south of the Hallingskarvet National Park which partially sits inside Ulvik and includes the Hallingskarvet mountains. Lakes in the region include Finsevatnet and Flakavatnet. The headwaters of the Flåmselvi river also lie in Ulvik. The highest point in the municipality is the 1,860.95-metre (6,105.5 ft) tall mountain peak at the highest point of the Hardangerjøkulen, just north of the border with Eidfjord Municipality.

Aurland Municipality lies to the north, Hol Municipality (in Buskerud county) lies to the east, Eidfjord Municipality lies to the south, and Voss Municipality lies to the west.

== History ==
After the dissolution of the union between Sweden and Norway in 1905, Ulvik Municipality was one of the few municipalities in all of Norway that returned a majority in favour of a republic rather than a monarchy in the national referendum on the issue.

The village of Ulvik was nearly totally destroyed on 25 April 1940, during the German invasion of Norway, when fighting erupted between a German landing party arriving in boats, and a Norwegian force on land. Most of the village was burned down, and three civilians were killed. An unknown number of German soldiers were also killed in the fighting.

== Population ==
Historical population

Year	Pop.	±% p.a.
1855	3,799	—
1865	3,890	+0.24%
1875	3,920	+0.08%
1891	1,419	−6.15%
1900	1,574	+1.16%
1910	1,650	+0.47%

Year	Pop.	±% p.a.
1920	1,747	+0.57%
1930	1,538	−1.27%
1946	1,517	−0.09%
1951	1,548	+0.41%
1960	1,488	−0.44%
1970	1,351	−0.96%

Year	Pop.	±% p.a.
1980	1,362	+0.08%
1990	1,239	−0.94%
2000	1,222	−0.14%
2010	1,129	−0.79%
2020	1,080	−0.44%
2023	1,056	−0.75%

Note: The municipal borders were changed in 1891, causing a significant change in the population.
Source: Statistics Norway and Norwegian Historical Data Centre

== Government ==
Ulvik Municipality is responsible for primary education (through 10th grade), outpatient health services, senior citizen services, welfare and other social services, zoning, economic development, and municipal roads and utilities. The municipality is governed by a municipal council of directly elected representatives. The mayor is indirectly elected by a vote of the municipal council. The municipality is under the jurisdiction of the Hordaland District Court and the Gulating Court of Appeal.

=== Municipal council ===
The municipal council (Heradsstyre) of Ulvik Municipality is made up of 17 representatives that are elected to four-year terms. The tables below show the current and historical composition of the council by political party.

Ulvik heradsstyre 2023–2027
Party name (in Nynorsk)	Number of representatives
Labour Party (Arbeidarpartiet)	3
Conservative Party (Høgre)	3
Centre Party (Senterpartiet)	4
Socialist Left Party (Sosialistisk Venstreparti)	2
Liberal Party (Venstre)	5
Total number of members:	17

Ulvik heradsstyre 2019–2023
Party name (in Nynorsk)	Number of representatives
Labour Party (Arbeidarpartiet)	5
Conservative Party (Høgre)	2
Centre Party (Senterpartiet)	5
Socialist Left Party (Sosialistisk Venstreparti)	2
Liberal Party (Venstre)	3
Total number of members:	17

Ulvik heradsstyre 2015–2019
Party name (in Nynorsk)	Number of representatives
Labour Party (Arbeidarpartiet)	5
Conservative Party (Høgre)	2
Centre Party (Senterpartiet)	4
Socialist Left Party (Sosialistisk Venstreparti)	2
Liberal Party (Venstre)	4
Total number of members:	17

Ulvik heradsstyre 2011–2015
Party name (in Nynorsk)	Number of representatives
Labour Party (Arbeidarpartiet)	3
Conservative Party (Høgre)	3
Centre Party (Senterpartiet)	3
Socialist Left Party (Sosialistisk Venstreparti)	2
Liberal Party (Venstre)	6
Total number of members:	17

Ulvik heradsstyre 2007–2011
Party name (in Nynorsk)	Number of representatives
Labour Party (Arbeidarpartiet)	2
Conservative Party (Høgre)	1
Centre Party (Senterpartiet)	4
Socialist Left Party (Sosialistisk Venstreparti)	3
Liberal Party (Venstre)	6
Local list (Bygdelista)	1
Total number of members:	17

Ulvik heradsstyre 2003–2007
Party name (in Nynorsk)	Number of representatives
Labour Party (Arbeidarpartiet)	3
Conservative Party (Høgre)	1
The Democrats (Demokratane)	1
Centre Party (Senterpartiet)	5
Socialist Left Party (Sosialistisk Venstreparti)	3
Liberal Party (Venstre)	4
Total number of members:	17

Ulvik heradsstyre 1999–2003
Party name (in Nynorsk)	Number of representatives
Labour Party (Arbeidarpartiet)	3
Progress Party (Framstegspartiet)	1
Conservative Party (Høgre)	1
Centre Party (Senterpartiet)	5
Socialist Left Party (Sosialistisk Venstreparti)	1
Liberal Party (Venstre)	6
Total number of members:	17

Ulvik heradsstyre 1995–1999
Party name (in Nynorsk)	Number of representatives
Labour Party (Arbeidarpartiet)	2
Conservative Party (Høgre)	1
Centre Party (Senterpartiet)	7
Socialist Left Party (Sosialistisk Venstreparti)	1
Liberal Party (Venstre)	6
Total number of members:	17

Ulvik heradsstyre 1991–1995
Party name (in Nynorsk)	Number of representatives
Labour Party (Arbeidarpartiet)	4
Conservative Party (Høgre)	2
Centre Party (Senterpartiet)	7
Socialist Left Party (Sosialistisk Venstreparti)	2
Liberal Party (Venstre)	2
Total number of members:	17

Ulvik heradsstyre 1987–1991
Party name (in Nynorsk)	Number of representatives
Labour Party (Arbeidarpartiet)	5
Conservative Party (Høgre)	2
Centre Party (Senterpartiet)	6
Socialist Left Party (Sosialistisk Venstreparti)	1
Liberal Party (Venstre)	3
Total number of members:	17

Ulvik heradsstyre 1983–1987
Party name (in Nynorsk)	Number of representatives
Labour Party (Arbeidarpartiet)	6
Conservative Party (Høgre)	2
Centre Party (Senterpartiet)	5
Liberal Party (Venstre)	4
Total number of members:	17

Ulvik heradsstyre 1979–1983
Party name (in Nynorsk)	Number of representatives
Labour Party (Arbeidarpartiet)	6
Conservative Party (Høgre)	3
Centre Party (Senterpartiet)	6
Liberal Party (Venstre)	2
Total number of members:	17

Ulvik heradsstyre 1975–1979
Party name (in Nynorsk)	Number of representatives
Labour Party (Arbeidarpartiet)	5
Conservative Party (Høgre)	2
Centre Party (Senterpartiet)	7
Joint list of the Christian Democratic Party (Kristeleg Folkeparti), New People's Party (Nye Folkepartiet), and Liberal Party (Venstre)	3
Total number of members:	17

Ulvik heradsstyre 1971–1975
Party name (in Nynorsk)	Number of representatives
Labour Party (Arbeidarpartiet)	6
Conservative Party (Høgre)	1
Centre Party (Senterpartiet)	7
Liberal Party (Venstre)	3
Total number of members:	17

Ulvik heradsstyre 1967–1971
Party name (in Nynorsk)	Number of representatives
Labour Party (Arbeidarpartiet)	5
Conservative Party (Høgre)	2
Centre Party (Senterpartiet)	4
Liberal Party (Venstre)	4
Joint List(s) of Non-Socialist Parties (Borgarlege Felleslister)	2
Total number of members:	17

Ulvik heradsstyre 1963–1967
Party name (in Nynorsk)	Number of representatives
Labour Party (Arbeidarpartiet)	6
Conservative Party (Høgre)	2
Centre Party (Senterpartiet)	5
Liberal Party (Venstre)	4
Total number of members:	17

Ulvik heradsstyre 1959–1963
Party name (in Nynorsk)	Number of representatives
Labour Party (Arbeidarpartiet)	6
Conservative Party (Høgre)	2
Centre Party (Senterpartiet)	6
Liberal Party (Venstre)	3
Total number of members:	17

Ulvik heradsstyre 1955–1959
Party name (in Nynorsk)	Number of representatives
Labour Party (Arbeidarpartiet)	6
Conservative Party (Høgre)	1
Farmers' Party (Bondepartiet)	5
Liberal Party (Venstre)	5
Total number of members:	17

Ulvik heradsstyre 1951–1955
Party name (in Nynorsk)	Number of representatives
Labour Party (Arbeidarpartiet)	6
Liberal Party (Venstre)	5
Joint List(s) of Non-Socialist Parties (Borgarlege Felleslister)	5
Total number of members:	16

Ulvik heradsstyre 1947–1951
Party name (in Nynorsk)	Number of representatives
Labour Party (Arbeidarpartiet)	6
Liberal Party (Venstre)	4
Joint List(s) of Non-Socialist Parties (Borgarlege Felleslister)	6
Total number of members:	16

Ulvik heradsstyre 1945–1947
Party name (in Nynorsk)	Number of representatives
Labour Party (Arbeidarpartiet)	7
Local List(s) (Lokale lister)	9
Total number of members:	16

Ulvik heradsstyre 1937–1941*
Party name (in Nynorsk)	Number of representatives
Labour Party (Arbeidarpartiet)	6
Liberal Party (Venstre)	6
Joint List(s) of Non-Socialist Parties (Borgarlege Felleslister)	4
Total number of members:	16
Note: Due to the German occupation of Norway during World War II, no elections were held for new municipal councils until after the war ended in 1945.

=== Mayors ===
The mayor (Nynorsk: ordførar) of Ulvik Municipality is the political leader of the municipality and the chairperson of the municipal council. The following people have held this position:

- 1838–1843: Capt. Nordbye
- 1844–1845: Gjert Hansen Lindebrække
- 1846–1849: Thorkild Poulsen Lekve
- 1850–1857: Gjert Hansen Lindebrække
- 1858–1859: Paul Sponheim
- 1860–1873: Kristofer F.K. Hjeltnæs
- 1874–1875: Sjur Sponheim
- 1876–1887: Hans Larsen Saakvitne (V)
- 1888–1889: Hans Lindebrække
- 1890–1891: Hans Larsen Saakvitne (V)
- 1892–1913: Hans Lindebrække
- 1914–1916: Kristofer Kristofersson Hjeltnes (V)
- 1917–1919: Gjert K. Lindebrække
- 1920–1925: Kristofer F.K. Hjeltnes (V)
- 1925–1928: Kristofer K. Hjeltnes (V)
- 1929–1931: Gjert K. Lindebrække
- 1932–1940: Kristofer K. Hjeltnes (V)
- 1941–1941: Lars M. Øydvin
- 1942–1945: Lars Børsheim (NS)
- 1945–1945: Kristofer K. Hjeltnes (V)
- 1945–1951: Olav Lindebrekke
- 1951–1959: Magnus T. Øydvin (Bp)
- 1959–1971: Lars O. Aurdal (V)
- 1971–1983: Ragnvald Olav Fleten (Sp)
- 1983–1987: Knut Nes (Sp)
- 1987–1991: Lars Sponheim (V)
- 1991–1995: Ragnvald Olav Fleten (Sp)
- 1995–2001: Terje Breivik (V)
- 2001–2007: Jon Olav Heggseth (Sp)
- 2007–2011: Mona Haugland Hellesnes (V)
- 2011–2023: Hans Petter Thorbjørnsen (Ap)
- 2023–present: Jens Olav Holven (Sp)

=== Police ===
In 2016, the chief of police for Vestlandet formally suggested a reconfiguration of police districts and stations. He proposed that the police station in Ulvik be closed.

== Transportation ==
Finse is the highest point of the Norwegian Railway System, located at 1222m. above sea level

It takes around two hours to drive from the city of Bergen to Ulvik via the European route E16 highway to Vossavangen and then taking Norwegian National Road 13 through the Vallavik Tunnel to Ulvik Municipality. The Norwegian National Road 13 continues through Ulvik before crossing the Hardanger Bridge which goes over the Hardangerfjord. The nearest airport is Bergen Flesland Airport in Bergen.

The Bergen Line runs through the northern part of Ulvik Municipality. It runs through a region that has no road access, but is a popular with hiking and sports enthusiasts. The railway station at Finse on the Bergen Line at an elevation of 1,222 metres (4,009 ft) is the highest station on the Norwegian railway system. The Finse Tunnel just outside Finse is one of the longest railway tunnels in Norway. The Rallarvegen "road" is an historic road that follows the Bergen Line through Ulvik. It is a popular biking and hiking route. Ulvik is also visited in the summer by numerous foreign cruise ships who travel along the fjord.

== Notable people ==
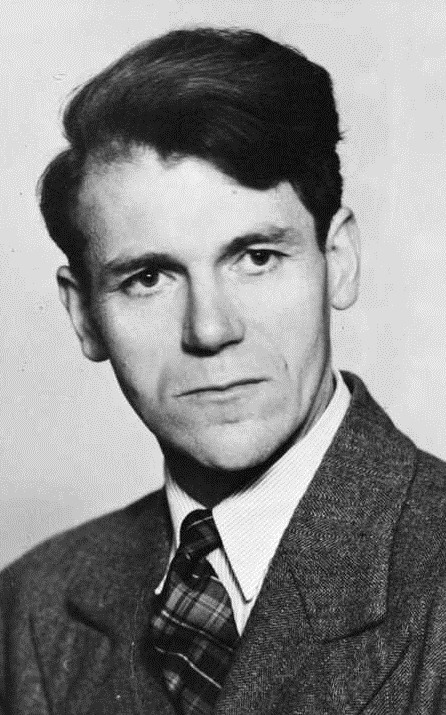
Olav Hauge, 1940

- Catharine Hermine Kølle (1788–1859), an adventurer, writer, and artist who lived in Ulvik from 1807
- Lars Osa (1860 in Ulvik – 1958), an artist who worked on church restorations and noted fiddle player
- Olav H. Hauge (1908 in Ulvik – 1994), a horticulturist, translator, and poet
- Sigbjørn Bernhoft Osa (1910 in Ulvik – 1990), a fiddler and traditional folk musician
- Gunnar Hjeltnes (1922 in Ulvik – 2013), an alpine skier who competed at the 1952 Winter Olympics
- Lars Sponheim (born 1957), a Norwegian politician who was County Governor of Vestland and Mayor of Ulvik from 1988-1991
- Terje Breivik (born 1965), a Norwegian politician and entrepreneur who was Mayor of Ulvik from 1995-2001
