= Hjeltnes =

Hjeltnes is a surname. Notable people with the surname include:

- Arne Hjeltnes (born 1963), Norwegian writer, television personality, marketer and politician
- Guri Hjeltnes (born 1953), Norwegian journalist and historian
- Knut Hjeltnes (athlete) (born 1952), former athlete from Norway
- Knut Hjeltnes (architect) (born 1961), Norwegian architect
- Kristofer Kristofersson Hjeltnes (1856–1930), Norwegian horticulturist and politician
- Kristofer Sjursson Hjeltnes (1730–1804), Norwegian farmer and businessperson
