= Olav H. Hauge =

Norwegian horticulturist, translator and poet

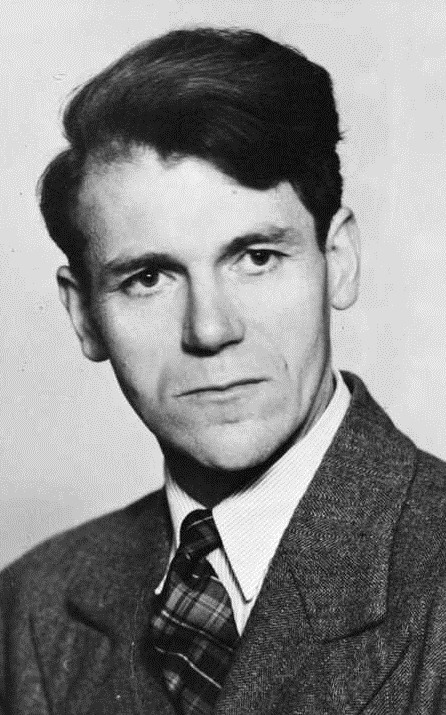
- Hauge, c. 1940
- Born: Olav Håkonson Hauge; 18 August 1908; Ulvik, Vestland, Norway
- Died: 23 May 1994 (aged 85); Ulvik, Vestland, Norway

Olav Håkonson Hauge (18 August 1908 – 23 May 1994) was a Norwegian horticulturist, translator and poet.

== Biography ==
Hauge was born at the village of Ulvik in Hordaland, Norway. His parents Håkon Hauge (1877-1954) and Katrina Hakestad (1873-1975) were farmers. Hauge attended middle school in Ulvik 1925–1926. He learned English and German in school and later taught himself French by reading. He spent many years training in horticulture and fruit cultivation. He went to Hjeltnes Horticulture School (Hjeltnes videregående skole) in Ulvik (1927 and 1933–34), Norwegian University of Life Sciences at Ås Municipality (1930) and the State Research Center (Statens forsøksgardt) at Hermansverk in Sogn og Fjordane (1931-1933). He lived his whole life in Ulvik working as a gardener in his own apple orchard.

Hauge was married to the artist Bodil Cappelen from 1978 until his death in 1994.

Hauge's first poems were published in 1946, all in a traditional form. He later wrote modernist poetry and in particular concrete poetry that inspired other, younger Norwegian poets, such as Jan Erik Vold. A well-known example, in the Norwegian original:

Katten
sit i tunet
når du kjem.
Snakk litt med katten.
Det er han som er varast i garden.

In English translation:

The cat is sitting
out front
when you come.
Talk a bit with the cat.
He is the most sensitive one here.

Aside from writing his own poems, he was internationally oriented, and translated poems by Alfred Tennyson, William Butler Yeats, Robert Browning, Stéphane Mallarmé, Arthur Rimbaud, Stephen Crane, Friedrich Hölderlin, Georg Trakl, Paul Celan, Bertolt Brecht and Robert Bly to Norwegian. He also wrote poetry in homage to fellow poets William Blake, Paul Celan, Gérard de Nerval and Emily Dickinson. He was also inspired by classical Chinese poetry, e.g. in his poem "T`ao Ch`ien" in the collection Spør vinden.

Hauge has been translated to English by the Scottish poet Robin Fulton in Olav Hauge: Selected Poems, from 1990, and by the American poet Robert Bly in Trusting Your Life to Water and Eternity: Twenty Poems of Olav H. Hauge, from 1987. The American author Robert Hedin translated Hauge in 2001 in the collection The Bullfinch Rising from the Cherry Tree: Poems of Olav H. Hauge and in Leaf-huts and Snow-houses in 2004. Robert Bly and Robert Hedin together translated Hauge in 2008 in The Dream We Carry: Selected and Last Poems of Olav H. Hauge. Words from Glor i oska were used as lyrics for the Solefald song "Song til stormen" off of their 2010 album, Norrøn Livskunst.

Olav H. Hauge Center (Olav H. Hauge - Senteret) is situated on Brakanes near Ulvikafjorden. The center includes an exhibition, library of poetry, poetry workshop and museum highlighting the poet's life and work. Nynorsk kultursentrum manages both the Olav H. Hauge Centre and the Ivar Aasen-instituttet in Ørsta Municipality.

== List of works ==
- Glør i oska (Noregs boklag, 1946)
- Under bergfallet (Noregs boklag, 1951), Beneath the Crag
- Seint rodnar skog i djuvet (Noregs boklag, 1956), Slowly the Trees Turn Red in the Gorge
- På ørnetuva (Noregs boklag, 1961), On the Eagle's Tussock
- Dikt i utval: Dogg og dagar editor Ragnvald Skrede. (Noregs boklag, 1965)
- Dropar i austavind (Noregs boklag, 1966), Drops in the East Wind
- Spør vinden (Noregs boklag, 1971), Ask the Wind
- Dikt i samling (Noregs boklag, 1972)
- Syn oss åkeren din in selection by Jan Erik Vold. Bokklubben, 1975. (Collected from Dikt i samling)
- Janglestrå (Samlaget, 1980), Gleanings
- Regnbogane (1983) (Children's book, illustrations by Wenche Øyen)
- ABC, 1986 (Children's book)
- Mange års røynsle med pil og boge (recording). (Samlaget, 1988)
- Brev 1970-1975 (Cappelen, 1996)
- Det er den draumen (Samlaget, 1998), It's the Dream
- Dagbok 1924-1994 (Samlaget, 2000)
- Skogen stend, men han skiftar sine tre. Aforismar i utval (Samlaget, 2001)

== Translations ==
- Utanlandske dikt, 1967
- Stephen Crane: Svarte ryttarar, 1974
- Bertolt Brecht: Til ettertidi, 1978
- Hand grip hand i svevne, 1978
- Dikt i umsetjing, 1982
- Frå Rimbaud til Celan, 1991

== Awards ==
- Kritikerprisen for På ørnetuva - 1961
- Sokneprest Alfred Andersson-Ryssts fond 1968
- Dobloug Prize - 1969
- Sunnmørsprisen for Spør vinden - 1971
- Melsom-prisen - 1973
- Aschehougprisen- 1978
- Nynorsk barnelitteraturpris for Regnbogane (jointly with Wenche Øyen) - 1983

== Translations of his poetry ==
- Olav Hauge translated into Ukrainian by Viktoria Rudych (2019) За горою самотності (Krok Publishers) ISBN 978-617-692-548-4
- Olav Hauge translated by Olav Grinde (2016) Luminous Spaces: Olav H. Hauge: Selected Poems & Journals (White Pine Press) ISBN 978-1935210801
- Olav Hauge translated by Robert Bly and Robert Hedin (2008) The Dream We Carry: Selected and Last Poems of Olav Hauge (Copper Canyon Press) ISBN 978-1556592881
- Olav Hauge translated by Robin Fulton (1990) Olav Hauge: Selected Poems (White Pine Press) ISBN 978-1877727030
- Olav Hauge translated by Robert Bly (1987) Trusting Your Life to Water and Eternity: Twenty Poems of Olav H. Hauge (Milkweed Editions) ISBN 978-0915943289
- Olav Hauge translated by Sabina Messeg and Hannah May Svnedal 2010, Elvi Burtanum Fjorden, הנהר שמעבר לפיורד, Carmel publishing house, ISBN 978-965-540-653-5
