= McNeeley =

McNeeley may refer to:

== People ==
- Kristofer McNeeley (born 1974), American actor
- Liam McNeeley (born 2005), American basketball player
- Peter McNeeley (born 1968), American boxer, son of Tom
- Tom McNeeley (1937–2011), American boxer

== Places ==
- McNeeley Peak (Washington), a summit in Mount Rainier National Park, Washington, USA.
- 16268 Mcneeley, a main-belt asteroid

== See also ==
- McNeely
