= Hans Larsen Saakvitne =

Norwegian politician

Hans Larsen Saakvitne (3 July 1839 – 9 November 1910) was a Norwegian farmer, bailiff and politician for the Liberal Party. He was mayor for several years, and served four terms as a regular representative in the Norwegian Parliament.

== Career ==
He was born in Granvin Municipality as a son of farmers. He spent much of his career as a farmer; from 1863 to 1892. He also worked as a teacher from 1859 to 1866, having taken his education in Voss Municipality. He became involved in politics, and was mayor of Ulvik Municipality from 1876 to 1888 and 1890 til 1891. Then, when Granvin Municipality was created, he was mayor there from 1891 to 1892. He then withdrew from local politics to become bailiff in Vossestrand Municipality from 1892 to 1901, and in Ulvik Municipality from 1901.

Saakvitne also became involved in national politics. He served as a deputy member of the Norwegian Parliament during the term 1880–1882, and was elected as a regular representative in 1883 and 1886. He met regularly in Parliament during his deputy term as well—from April 1880. He belonged to the Liberal Party from its establishment in 1884, and came to adhere to the Pure Liberals (Rene Venstre) fraction following the subsequent party split. As such he turned against the Liberal Prime Minister Johan Sverdrup in 1888. The Pure Liberals were dissatisfied with the composition of Sverdrup's cabinet, and formally asked for a reshuffle in February 1888. Sverdrup interpreted this as a motion of no confidence, but this was irrelevant as the motion was voted down with 51 for and 61 against. Instead, four government ministers of the Pure Liberals (Sofus Arctander, Hans Rasmus Astrup, Birger Kildal, Elias Blix) resigned from the cabinet. Saakvitne left Parliament when his term expired. However, he returned for two non-consecutive terms, from 1898–1900 and 1907–1909. Hans Saakvitne was chairman of the constitutional committee that presented the proposal for universal suffrage for men in 1898. He represented the constituency Søndre Bergenhus Amt, except for the last term when he represented the single-member constituency Hardanger. He was noted for using his local dialect when speaking in Parliament.

In June 1863 Saakvitne married Torbjørg Sjursdatter Nesheim (1844–1933), a farmer's daughter from Granvin. He died in November 1910 in Ulvik, one year after the end of his last parliamentary term.
