= Kristofer Sjursson Hjeltnes =

Kristofer Sjursson Hjeltnes (1730–April 1804) was a Norwegian farmer and businessperson.

Hjeltnes was born in the parish of Ulvik in Hordaland, Norway. He was the son of Sjur Gunnarsson Ringøy (1689-1754) and Anna Christopherdotter Øydvin (1697-1761). As the sole surviving heir, he inherited the estate of his parents which included several forested farms as well as use of church property in the parish. He tried experimenting with the cultivation of various plant species including tobacco, caraway, clove and most importantly the potato. His successful experimentation with the potato in 1759 is commonly credited with first introducing its cultivation into the district of Hardanger. This was at a time in which the potato was first being successfully cultivated at various sites throughout the country.

He founded one of the first plant nurseries in the district and also established storehouses for grain. Besides farming, he was also involved in reindeer herding and ran a sawmill and a timber merchant company.

== Personal life ==
He married Marta Sjursdatter Vestrheim (1728-1805) in 1751. They had eight children. They were the great-grandparents of Kristofer Frimann Kristofersson Hjeltnes, a horticulturist who operated the Hjeltnes Horticulture School (Hjeltnes hagebruksskule) in Ulvik.
