= McNeely =

McNeely is a surname. Notable people with the surname include:

- Ammon McNeely (born 1970), American rock climber
- Big Jay McNeely (1927–2018), American rhythm and blues tenor saxophonist
- Bob McNeely (born 1945), American photographer; Chief Official White House Photographer from 1993 to 1998
- Clifton McNeely (1919–2003), American basketball player and coach
- Earl McNeely (1897–1971), American professional baseball player
- Jeff McNeely (born 1969), American professional baseball player
- Jim McNeely (1949–2025), American jazz composer, arranger, and pianist
- Joel McNeely (born 1959), American composer of television and film music
- Kyle McNeely (contemporary), American professional wrestler known under the ring name of Onyx
- Larry McNeely (born 1948), American banjo player
- Phil McNeely (contemporary), Canadian politician from Ontario
- Thompson W. McNeely (1835–1921), American politician from Ohio; U.S. Representative 1869–73

== See also ==
- McNeeley
