= Old Eidfjord Church =

Church in Vestland, Norway

- Eidfjord gamle kyrkje
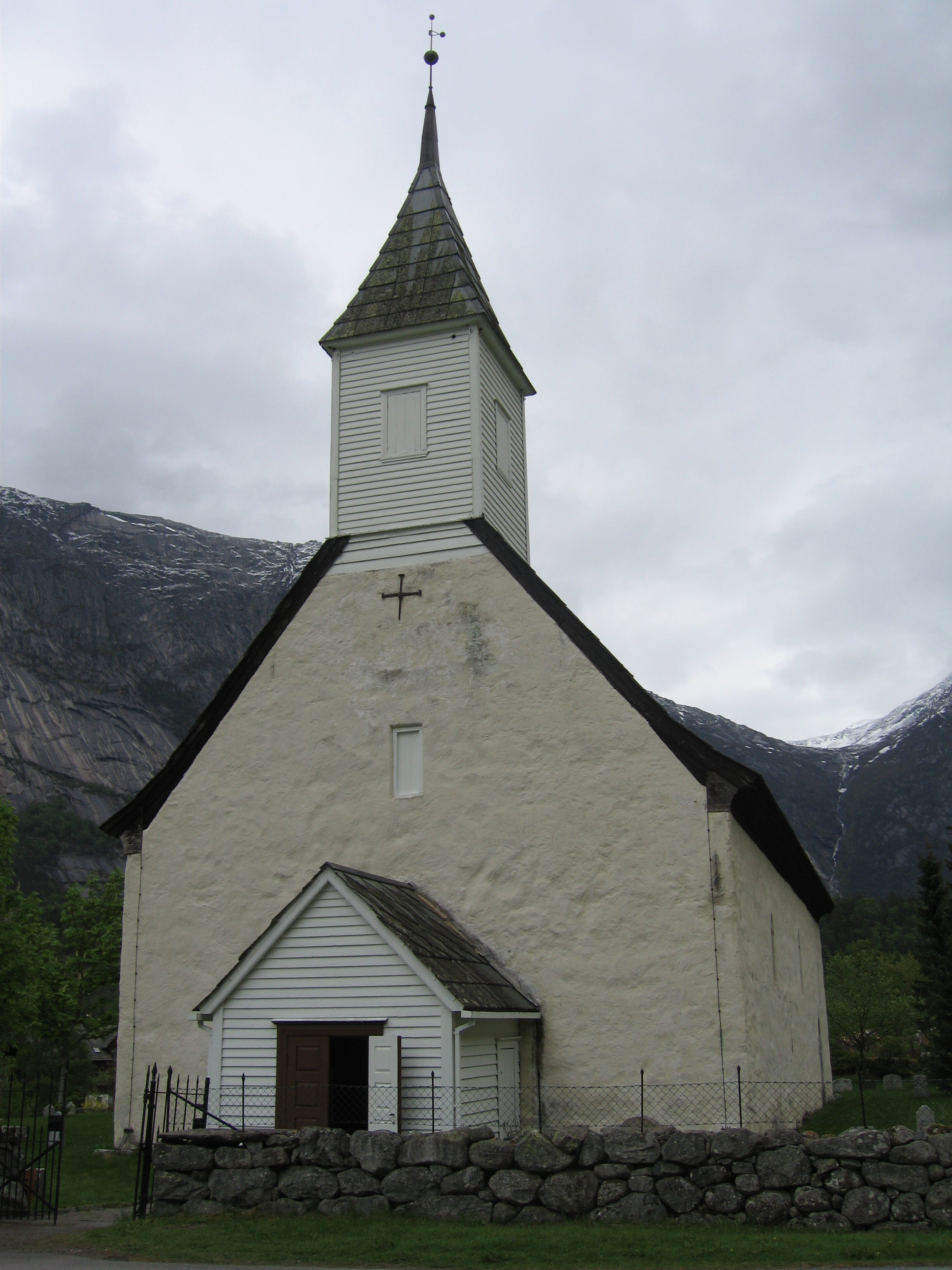
- View of the church
- Old Eidfjord Church
- 60°27′42″N 7°04′16″E
- Location: Eidfjord Municipality, Vestland
- Country: Norway
- Denomination: Church of Norway
- Previous denomination: Catholic Church
- Churchmanship: Evangelical Lutheran

History
- Former name: Vik kyrkje
- Status: Parish church
- Founded: c. 1300
- Consecrated: c. 1300

Architecture
- Functional status: Active
- Architectural type: Rectangular
- Completed: c. 1300 (726 years ago)

Specifications
- Capacity: 100
- Materials: Stone

Administration
- Diocese: Bjørgvin bispedømme
- Deanery: Hardanger og Voss prosti
- Parish: Eidfjord
- Norwegian Cultural Heritage Site
- Type: Church
- Status: Automatically protected
- ID: 84069

Old Eidfjord Church (Norwegian: Eidfjord gamle kyrkje) is a former parish church of the Church of Norway in Eidfjord Municipality in Vestland county, Norway. It is located in the village of Eidfjord. It was historically the church for the Eidfjord parish which is part of the Hardanger og Voss prosti (deanery) in the Diocese of Bjørgvin. The whitewashed, stone church was built in a rectangular design around the year 1309 using plans drawn up by an unknown architect. The church seats about 100 people.

The church was the main church for the Eidfjord parish (sokn) until 1981 when the new Eidfjord Church, which seats about 375 people, was completed. The old church is now used only for special occasions since it only seats about 100 people. The church is decorated as to look as it did in the 18th century.

== History ==
The earliest existing historical records of the church date back to around the year 1309 in a letter talking about how Thorgeir Peterson Sponheim gave money to help pay for the construction of this church. The church was originally constructed around the year 1300 using stone. The church's chancel and nave have the same width, giving the church a rectangular design. The rectangular building measures about 22.5 by 11.25 metres (73.8 ft × 36.9 ft) with the chancel area taking up about one-third of the space. The walls of the church vary, but typically range about 1.4 to 2.2 metres (4 ft 7 in to 7 ft 3 in) thick. During the 1600s, records show that the walls were in poor condition and so they were significantly repaired. Strangely, Eidfjord Church historically belonged to the Diocese of Stavanger, while the neighboring Kinsarvik Church and Ulvik Church (and the rest of the county) belonged to the Diocese of Bjørgvin. In 1630, the parish of Eidfjord was transferred to the Diocese of Bjørgvin. During the late-1600s, a wooden church porch was built on the west end of the nave. It was not until the 19th century that the church received a small tower on the roof. By the late-20th century, the old church was no longer appropriate to continue using as the church for the parish. A new Eidfjord Church was built just northwest of the old church in 1981 to replace the centuries-old building. Afterwards, the old church was renamed "Old Eidfjord Church" and it was taken out of regular use. It is now used mostly as a museum, but it is still used for special occasions.

== Media gallery ==
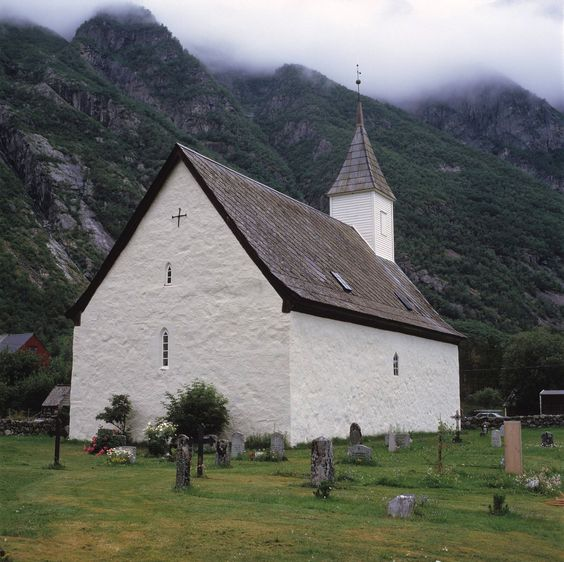
View of the rear of the building

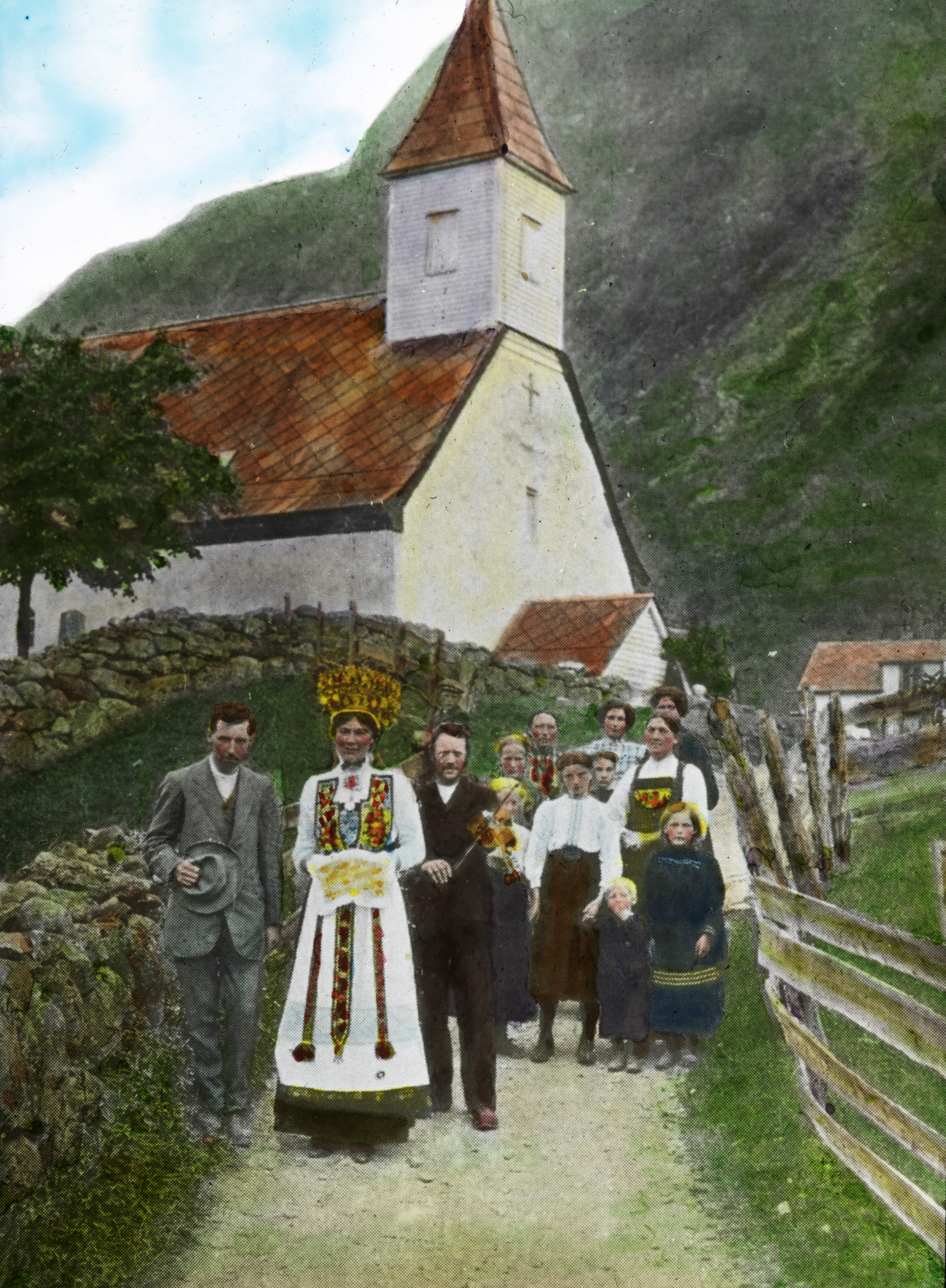
Wedding procession (1915)

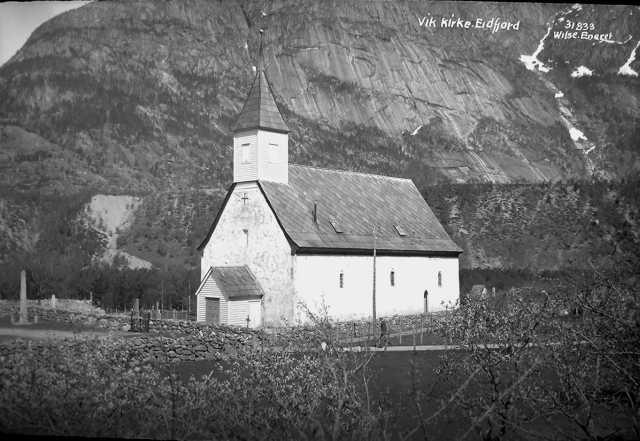
Exterior view (1927)

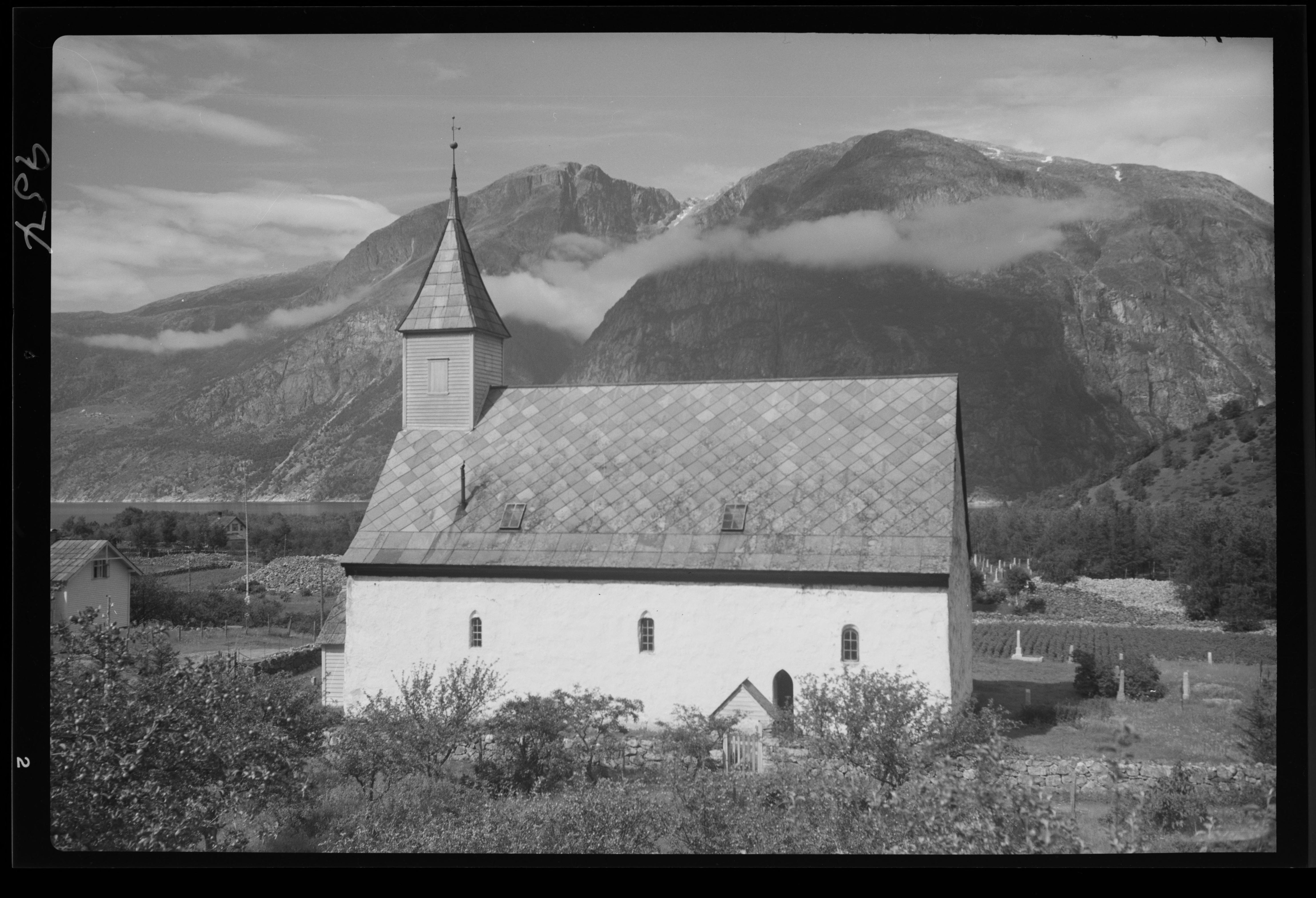
Exterior (c. 1940)

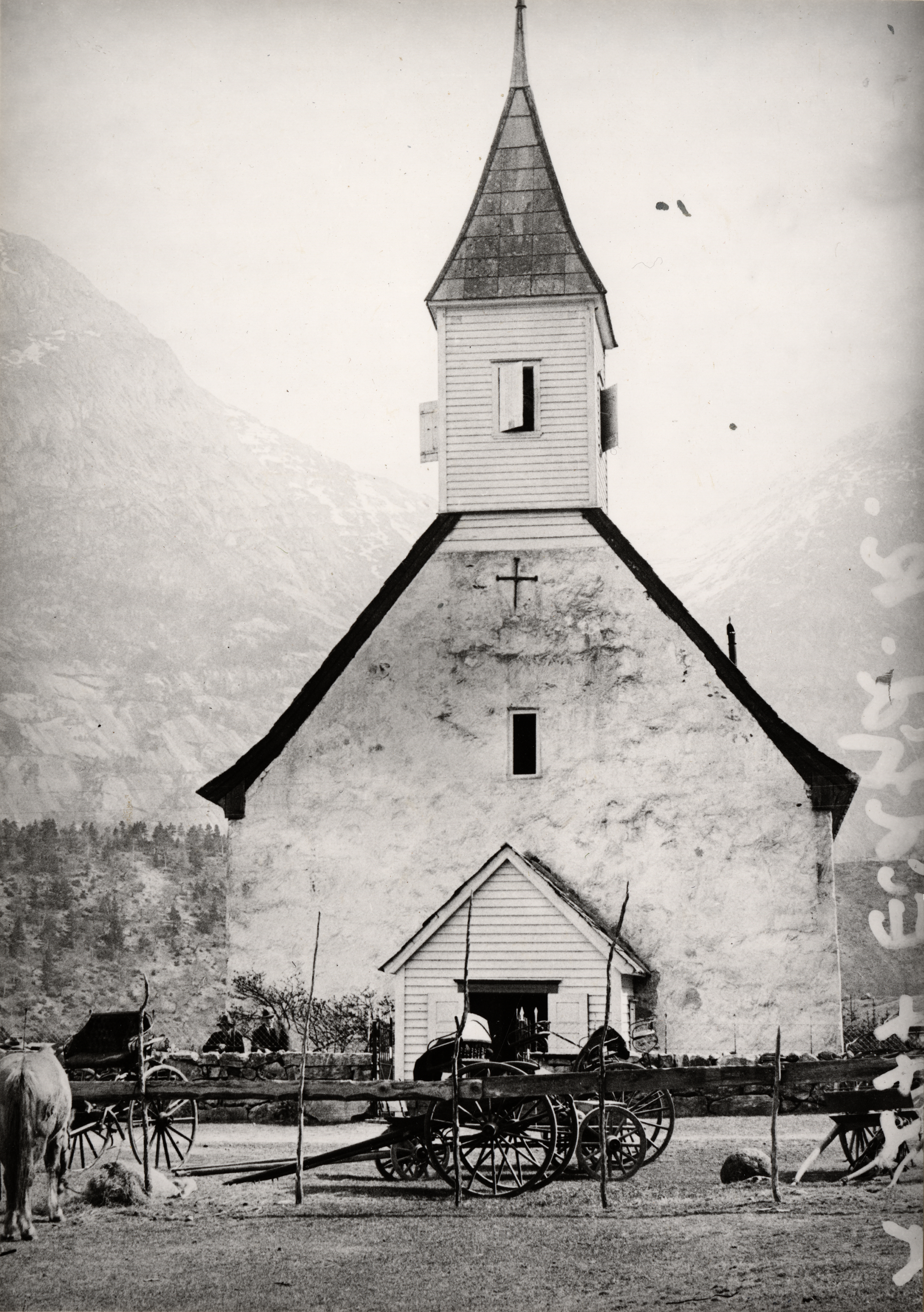
Front view (undated)

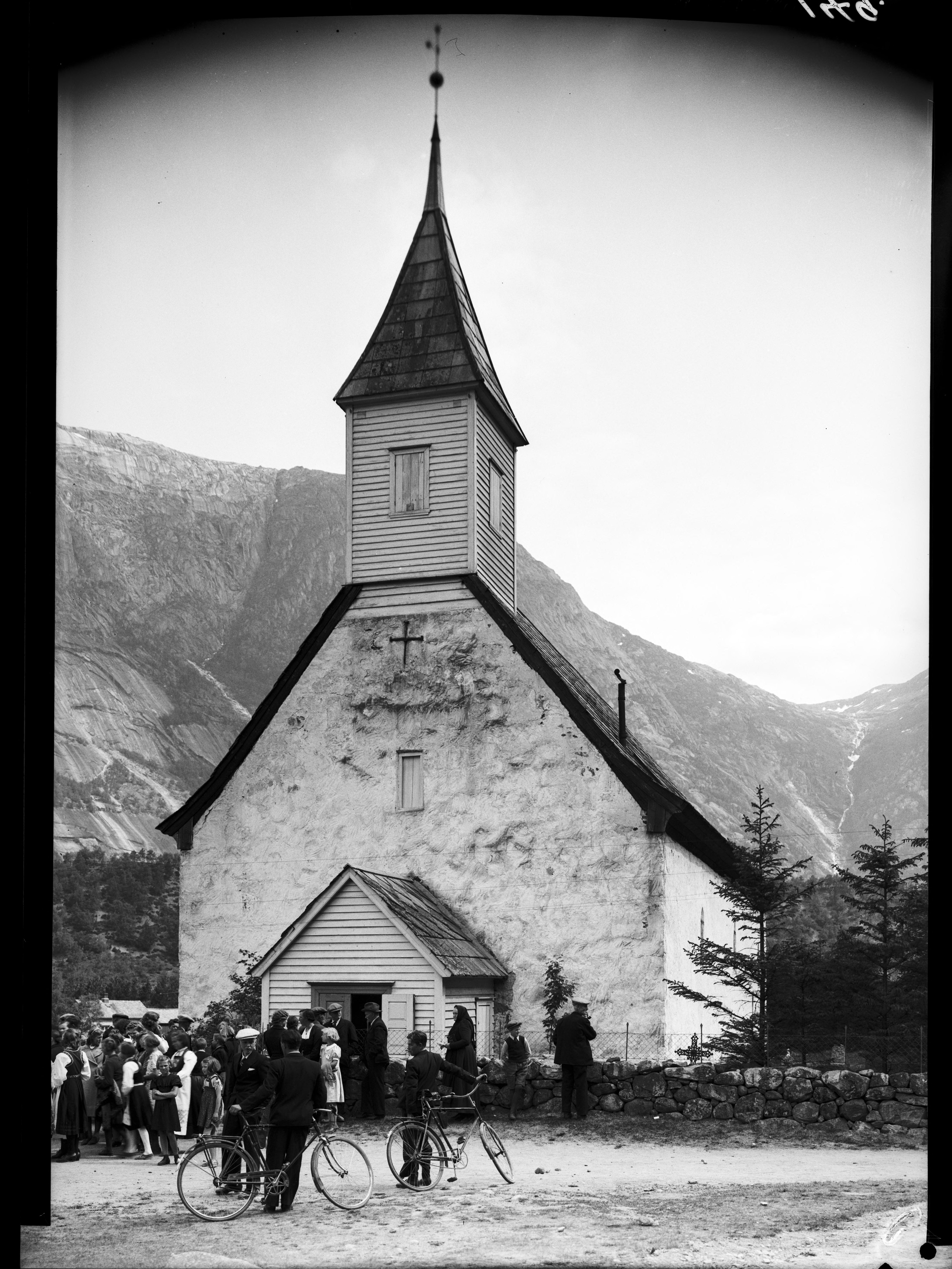
Exterior (c. 1950)

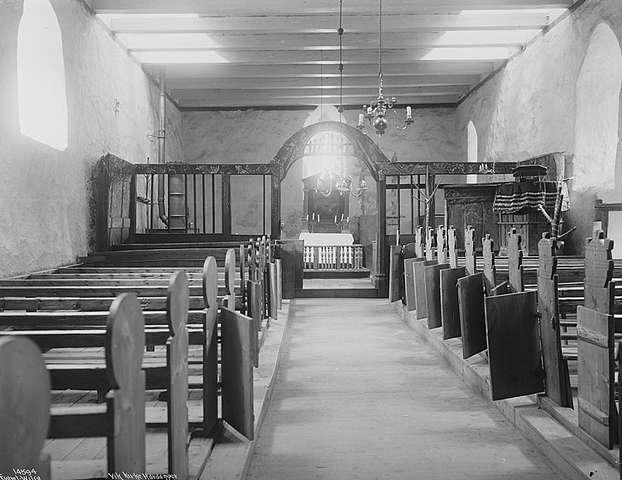
Interior view (1912)

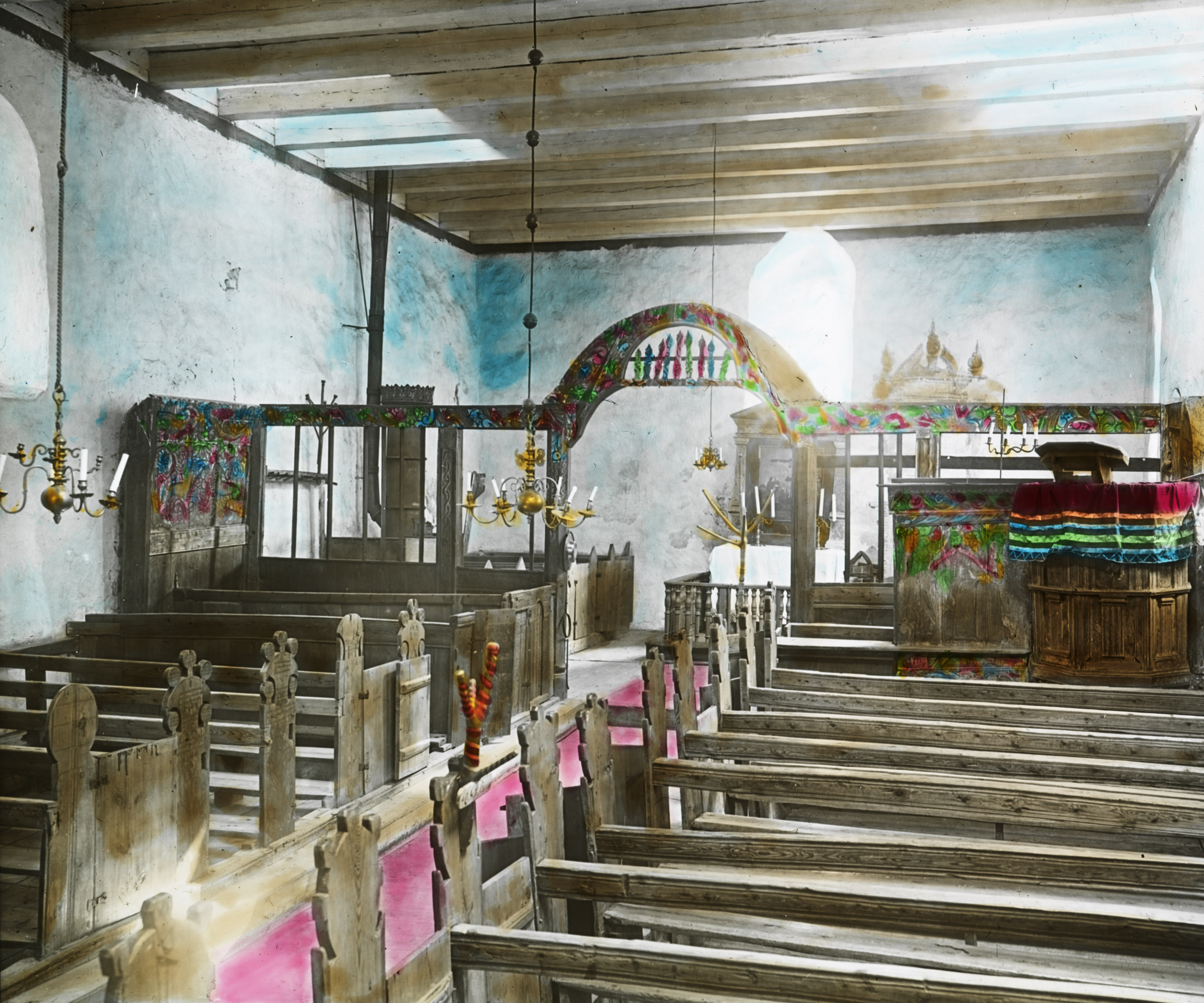
Interior (1915)

== See also ==
- List of churches in Bjørgvin
