= Eidsfjorden =

Eidsfjorden may refer to many different fjords in Norway:

- Eidsfjorden (Agder), a fjord in Farsund Municipality in Agder county
- Eidsfjorden (Askvoll), a fjord in Askvoll Municipality in Vestland county
- Eidsfjorden (Gulen), a fjord in Gulen Municipality in Vestland county
- Eidsfjorden (Nordland), a fjord in Hadsel and Sortland municipalities in Nordland county
- Eidsfjorden (Sogndal), a fjord in Sogndal Municipality in Vestland county
- Eidsfjorden (Stad), a fjord in Stad Municipality in Vestland county
- Eidsfjorden (Vaksdal), a fjord in Vaksdal Municipality in Vestland county
