= Kristofer Myhre =

Norwegian businessman

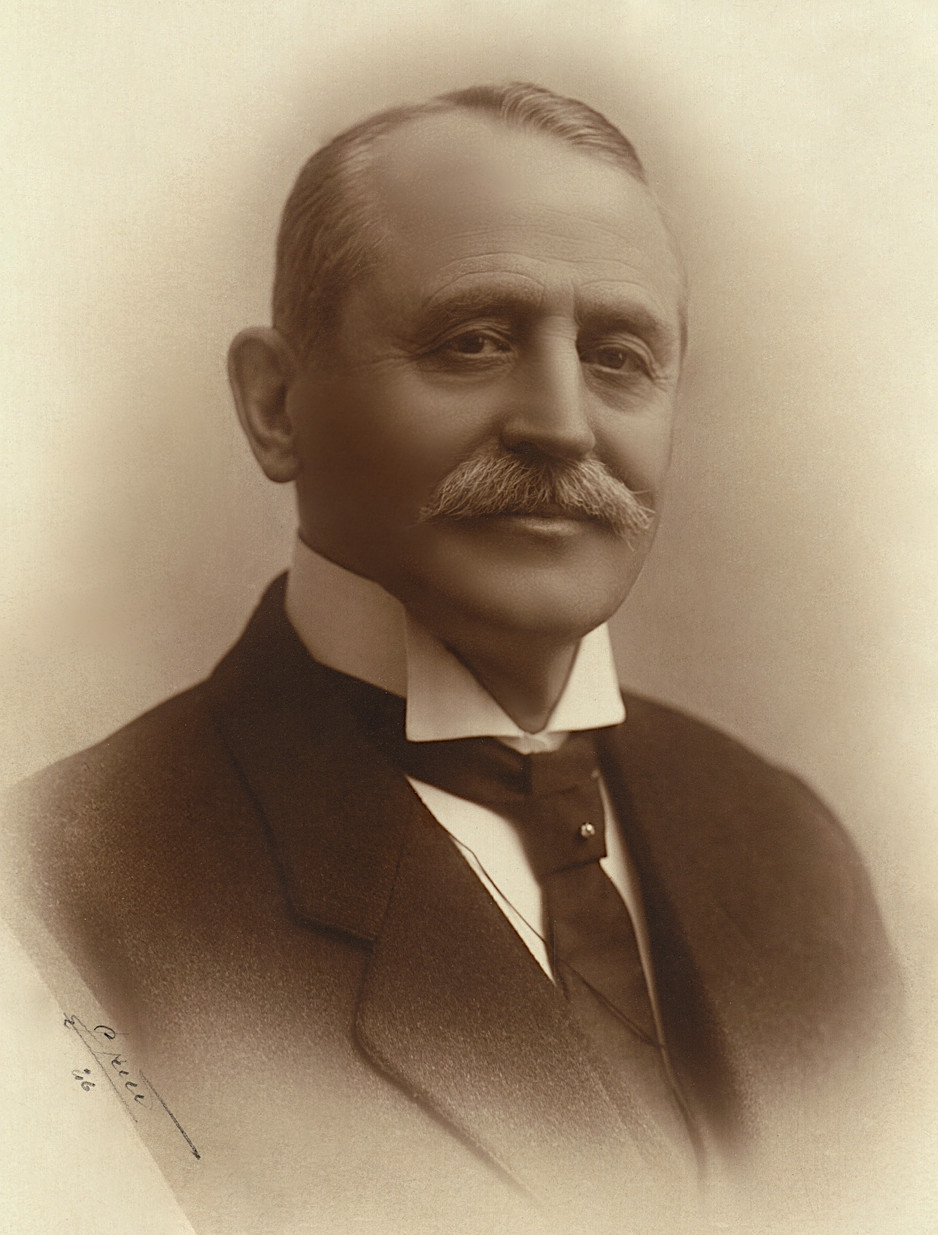

Kristofer Myhre (30 January 1856 – 8 January 1945) was a Norwegian businessperson.

Myhre was born at Skien in Telemark, Norway. He was a son of Gudmand Fredrik Myhre (1827–1901) and Betsy Fabricius (1832–1913). His brother Jonas Blom Myhre was a vicar. He was married twice, first to Valborg Wexelsen (1855–1889). After her death, in 1893 he married Ellen Clarissa Kiøsterud (1865–1942). She was a daughter of wholesaler A. S. Kiøsterud. Their daughter Ellen Myhre married chief physician Georg Henriksen .

He finished his secondary education in 1873, took officer training in 1874 and studied languages abroad from 1875 to 1876. In the military he reached the rank of major in 1907. After managing owning Christiania Trævarefabrik from 1879 to 1886, he re-located to Drammen. He founded Rødskog Bruk in 1886, Rødskog Guldlistefabrik in 1887 and Gøteborg Guldlistefabrik in 1897. From 1910 the companies were merged to the limited company Rødskog Bruk & Guldlistefabrik, and Myhre was chief executive.

Myhre was a national board member of the Federation of Norwegian Industries and a central board member of the Norwegian Employers' Confederation. He was deputy mayor of Skoger Municipality, and also was public trustee in Drammen Municipality and member of the Labour Court of Norway from 1915 to 1919. He was a vice consul for Belgium from 1921, and also a board member of Drammens Trævarefabrik and Wriedts Bryggeri and supervisory council member of Forsikringsselskapet Norge.
