= Kristofer Blindheim Grønskag =

Norwegian playwright

Kristofer Blindheim Grønskag (born December 4, 1984) is a Norwegian playwright.

Grønskag has a master's degree in Applied Theatre Science from the Norwegian University of Science and Technology in Trondheim.

His professional debut as a playwright was with the play The Beloved (Den elskede) in 2009, which premiered at Teaterhuset Avant Garden in Trondheim. He has written several plays for both children, youth and adults, and his work is so far translated into ten languages.

Next to his work as a playwright Grønskag has taught different classes at Norwegian universities.

Grønskag was playwright in residence at The Norwegian Centre for New Playwriting in Oslo 2014–2015. During the same period he was also the Norwegian representative in European Writers Lab.

== Selected plays in English ==
- 2016 - Counting to zero
- 2015 - Satellites in the Night Sky (children's theatre)
- 2012 - Kinder K
- 2009 - The Beloved

== Works produced in English ==
- 2017 - Kinder K at Drama Centre London. Produced by Cut the Cord Productions. Directed by Camilla Gürtler.

== Selected awards and nominations ==
- 2018 - Nominated for the National Ibsen Award 2018 for Counting to zero.
- 2018 - Winner of the Jugendtheaterpreis Baden-Württemberg for Satellites in the Night Sky. Translated by Nelly Winterhalder.
- 2017 - Winner of the Nordic Radio Drama Prize 2017 for the NRK radio theatre production of The Beloved.
- 2016 - Longlisted for the Deutscher Kindertheaterpreia 2016 for Satellites in the Night Sky.
- 2012 - Second place in the Norwegian Theatre Council's play contest for Kinder K.
- 2012 - Third place in the Norwegian Theatre Council's play contest for The Beloved.
- 2012 - Amsterdam Fringe Bronze Award for The Beloved.
