= Kristofer Kristofersson Hjeltnes =

Kristofer Frimann Kristofersson Hjeltnes (28 August 1856 – 17 January 1930) was a Norwegian horticulturist, educator and local elected official.

He was born at Ulvik Municipality in Søndre Bergenhus county, Norway. His parents, Kristofer Frimann Kristofersson Hjeltnes (1823–1910) and Marita Larsdotter Osa (1835–1911), were farmers. He attended Stend Agricultural School and Askov Højskole in Denmark. In 1884, Hjeltnes entered the Vilvorde Horticultural College (Vilvorde Havebrugsskole) operated by Stephan Nyeland (1845-1922).

Hjeltnes worked to spread horticulture in Western Norway in general, especially fruit growing. He founded the Hjeltnes Horticulture School (Hjeltnes hagebruksskule) in Ulvik and managed it from 1901 to 1918. Poet gardener Olav H. Hauge (1908-1994) would later attend this school.

He also served as an elected official. In 1884, where Hjeltnes was elected to the Ulvik local government of (Ulvik Heradsstyret), he was there until 1925. He was deputy mayor 1905-13 and chairman of the council (Ordførar ) 1914-16 and 1920-22.
