= Ulvik Church =

Church in Vestland, Norway

- Ulvik kyrkje
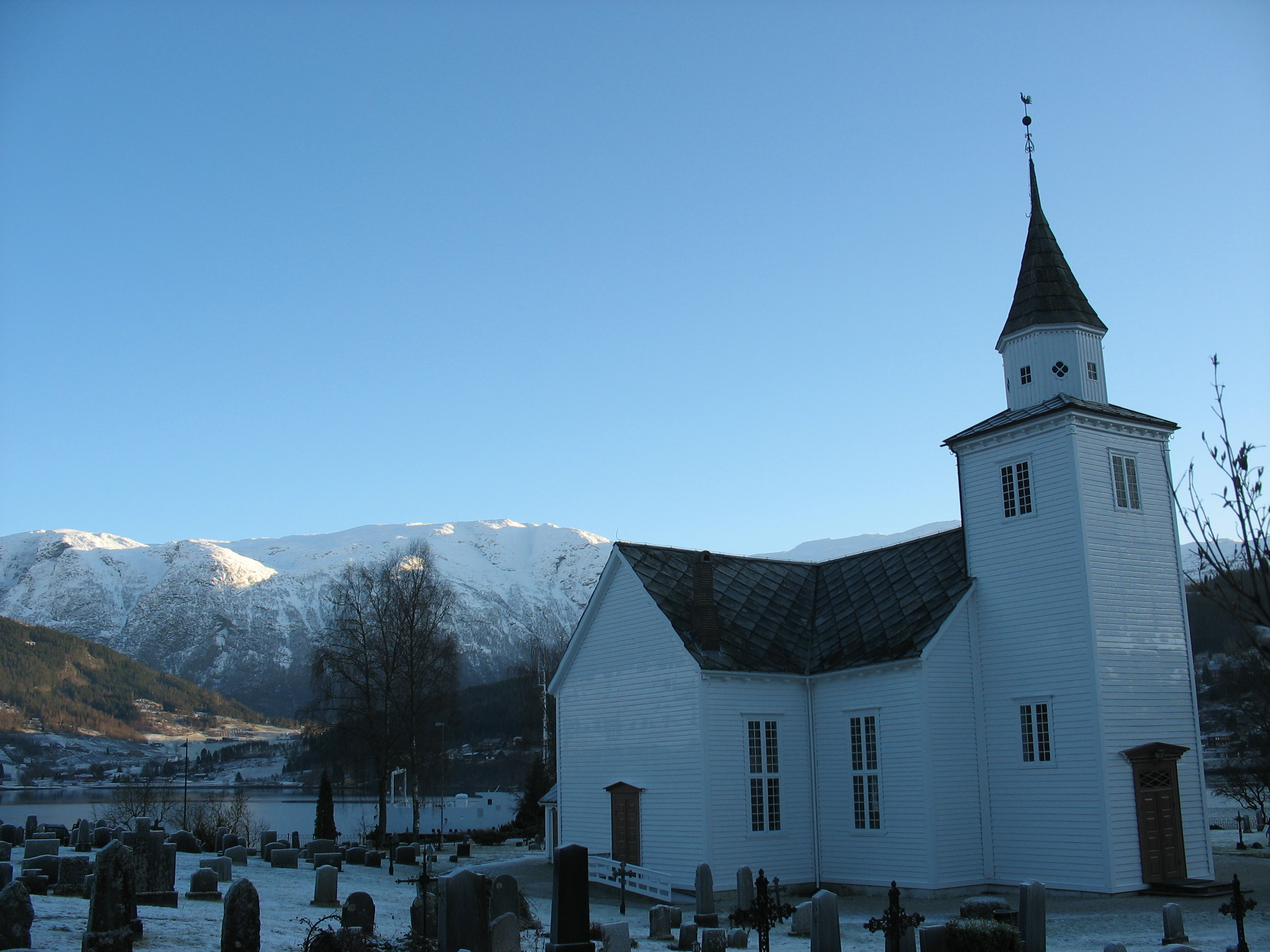
- View of the church
- Ulvik Church
- 60°34′03″N 6°55′03″E
- Location: Ulvik Municipality, Vestland
- Country: Norway
- Denomination: Church of Norway
- Previous denomination: Catholic Church
- Churchmanship: Evangelical Lutheran

History
- Status: Parish church
- Founded: 13th century
- Consecrated: 5 May 1859

Architecture
- Functional status: Active
- Architect: Hans Linstow
- Architectural type: Cruciform
- Completed: 1859 (167 years ago)

Specifications
- Capacity: 500
- Materials: Wood

Administration
- Diocese: Bjørgvin bispedømme
- Deanery: Hardanger og Voss prosti
- Parish: Ulvik
- Norwegian Cultural Heritage Site
- Type: Church
- Status: Listed
- ID: 85723

Ulvik Church (Norwegian: Ulvik kyrkje) is a parish church of the Church of Norway in Ulvik Municipality in Vestland county, Norway. It is located in the village of Ulvik. It is the church for the Ulvik parish which is part of the Hardanger og Voss prosti (deanery) in the Diocese of Bjørgvin. The white, wooden church was built in a cruciform design in 1859 using plans drawn up by the architect Hans Linstow. The church seats about 500 people.

== History ==
The current cruciform church is the third church to be located in Ulvik. The earliest existing historical records of the church date back to the year 1309, but the church was not new that year. The first church was a wooden stave church with open corridors surrounding the building and a large tower. This church was probably built during the first half of the 13th century and it was located at Nedre Hakastad, about 800 metres (2,600 ft) northeast of the present location of the church. Some parts of the original church, including the gate posts and antependium from the front of the altar are now at the Historical Museum in Bergen. A copy of this antependium (which is considered one of the great works of Norwegian medieval art) hangs today in the present church. The altar chalice, baptismal font, and the largest church bell in today's church all come from the old medieval stave church. By the beginning of the 1700s, the old church was quite old and in very poor condition. The stave church was torn down in 1710, and in 1711, a new, wooden, cruciform church was built on the same site. It is possible that some of the old materials were reused in the new building.

In 1814, this church served as an election church (Norwegian: valgkirke). Together with more than 300 other parish churches across Norway, it was a polling station for elections to the 1814 Norwegian Constituent Assembly which wrote the Constitution of Norway. This was Norway's first national elections. Each church parish was a constituency that elected people called "electors" who later met together in each county to elect the representatives for the assembly that was to meet at Eidsvoll Manor later that year.

By the 1850s, a report shows that the chancel and tower were both in such poor condition that the church urgently needed repairs or replacement. Plans were made to replace the church. The parish got designs from the architect Hans Linstow and hired Christian O. Valand as the lead builder. In 1859, a new church was constructed along the fjord, about 800 metres (2,600 ft) southwest of the old location of the church. The new church is a cruciform church with a tower above the main entrance. Then new church was consecrated on 5 May 1859 by the bishop Jens Matthias Pram Kaurin. After the new church was completed, the old church was torn down. The site of the old church remained as a cemetery for many years into the 20th century before being redone as a memorial grove as it is today.

== Interior ==
The altarpiece was painted in 1876 by Andreas Askevold. It is a replica of a French painting, and shows Jesus being taken down from the cross. The old altarpiece showing the Eucharist, also hangs in the church. This is from around 1630. The walls of the church were decorated by the artist Lars Osa from Ulvik in 1923. He painted traditional rosemaling designs throughout the interior of the church.

== Media gallery ==
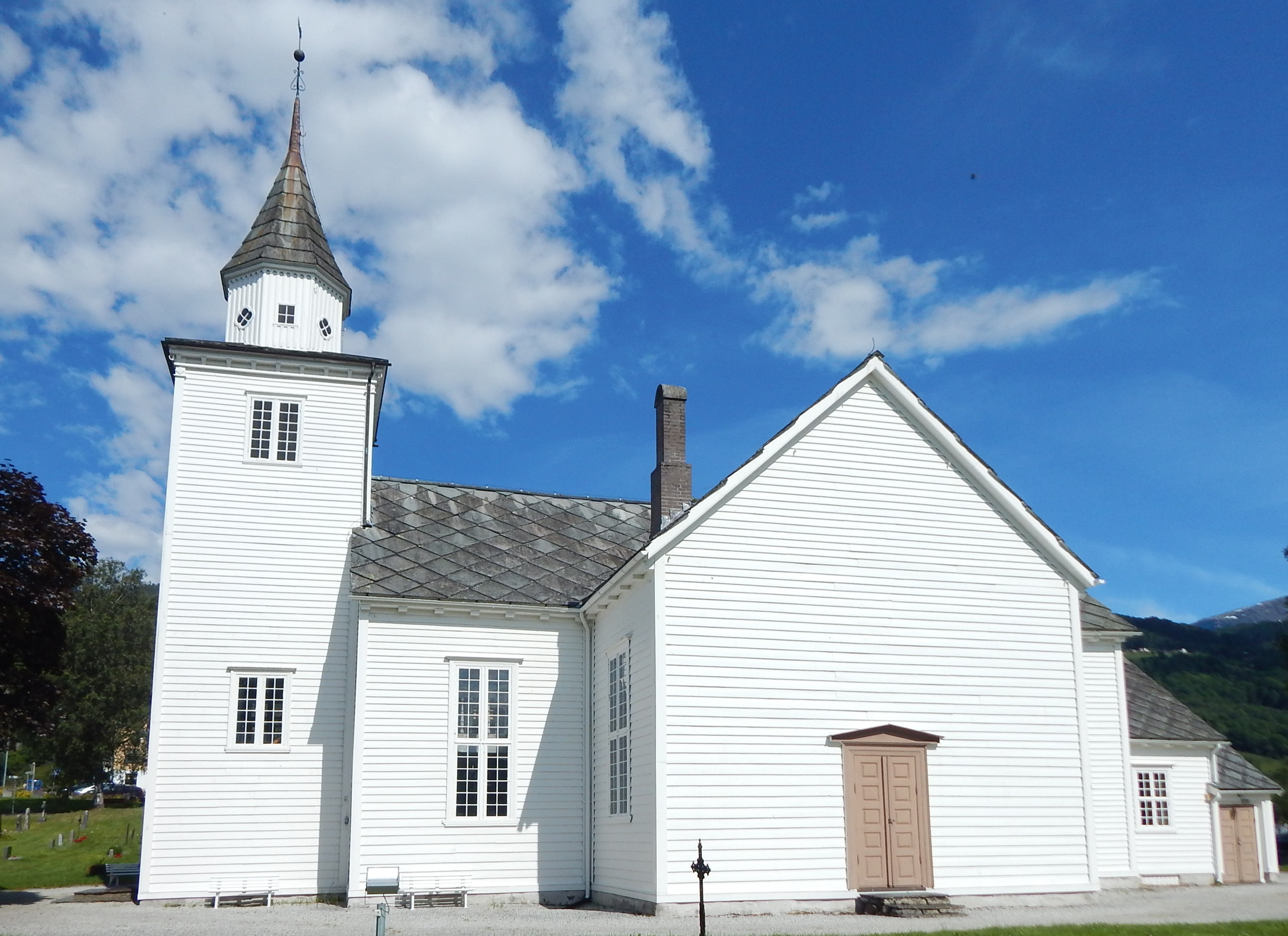
Exterior

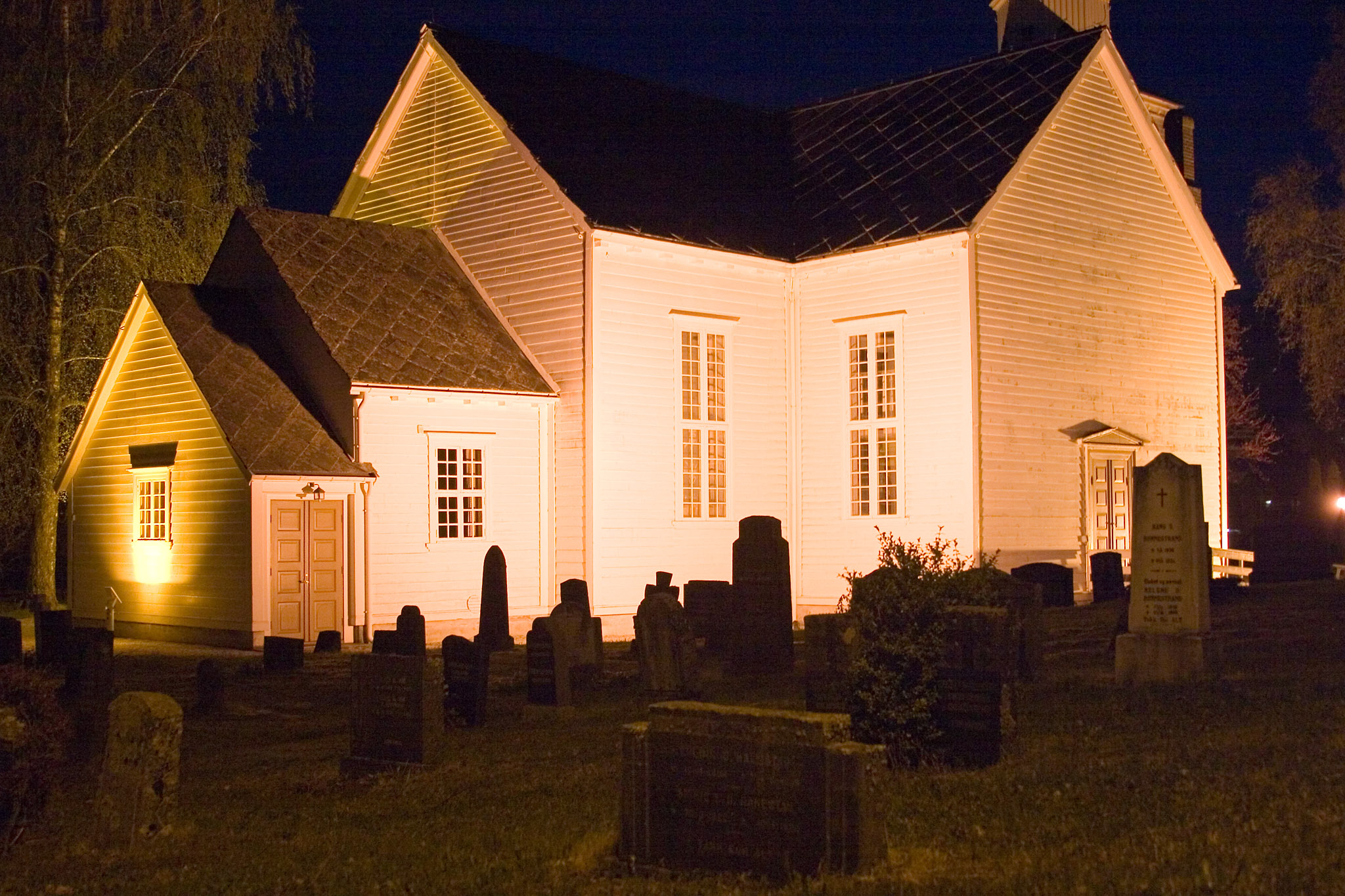
Exterior at night

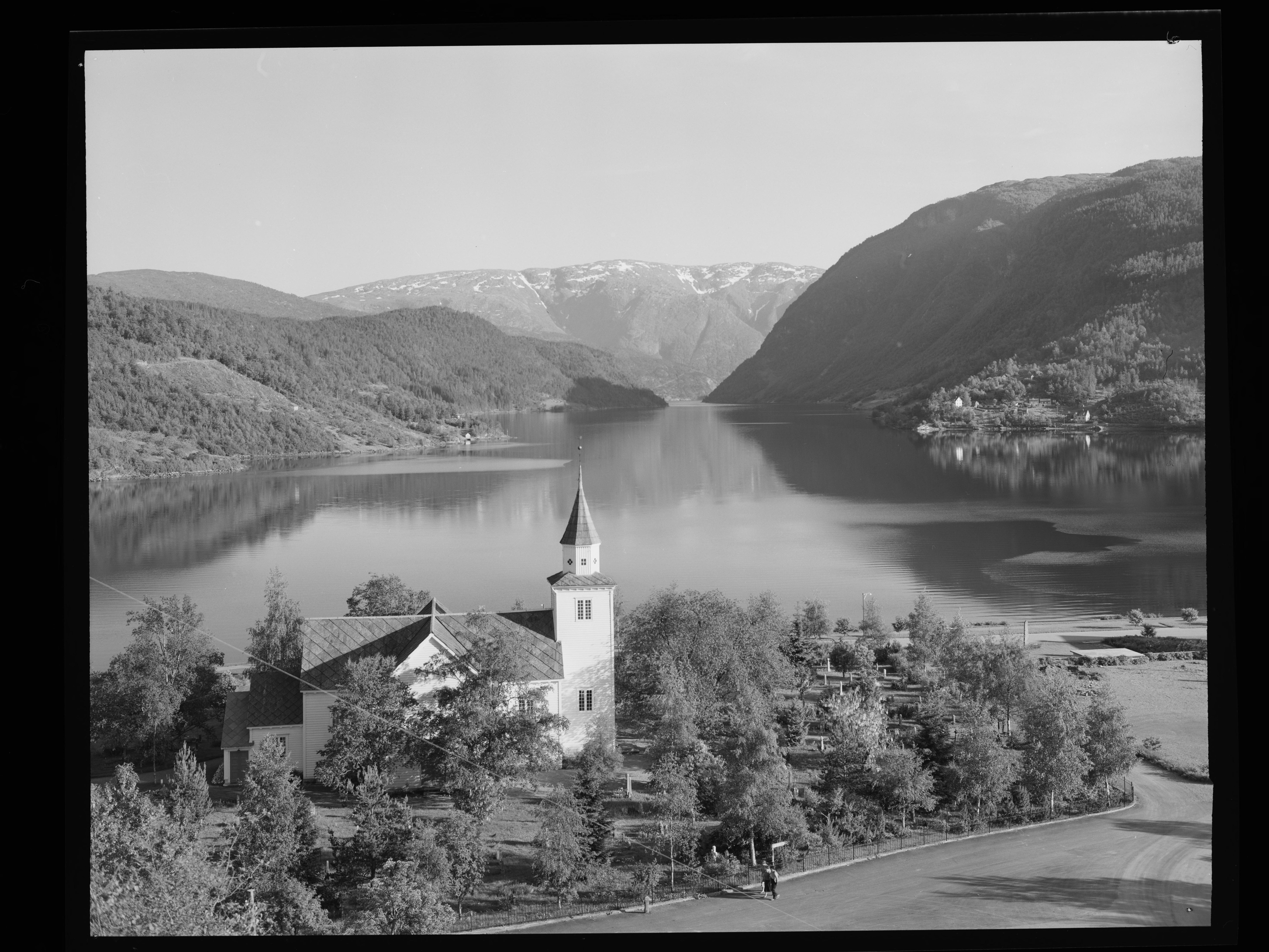
View of the church surroundings

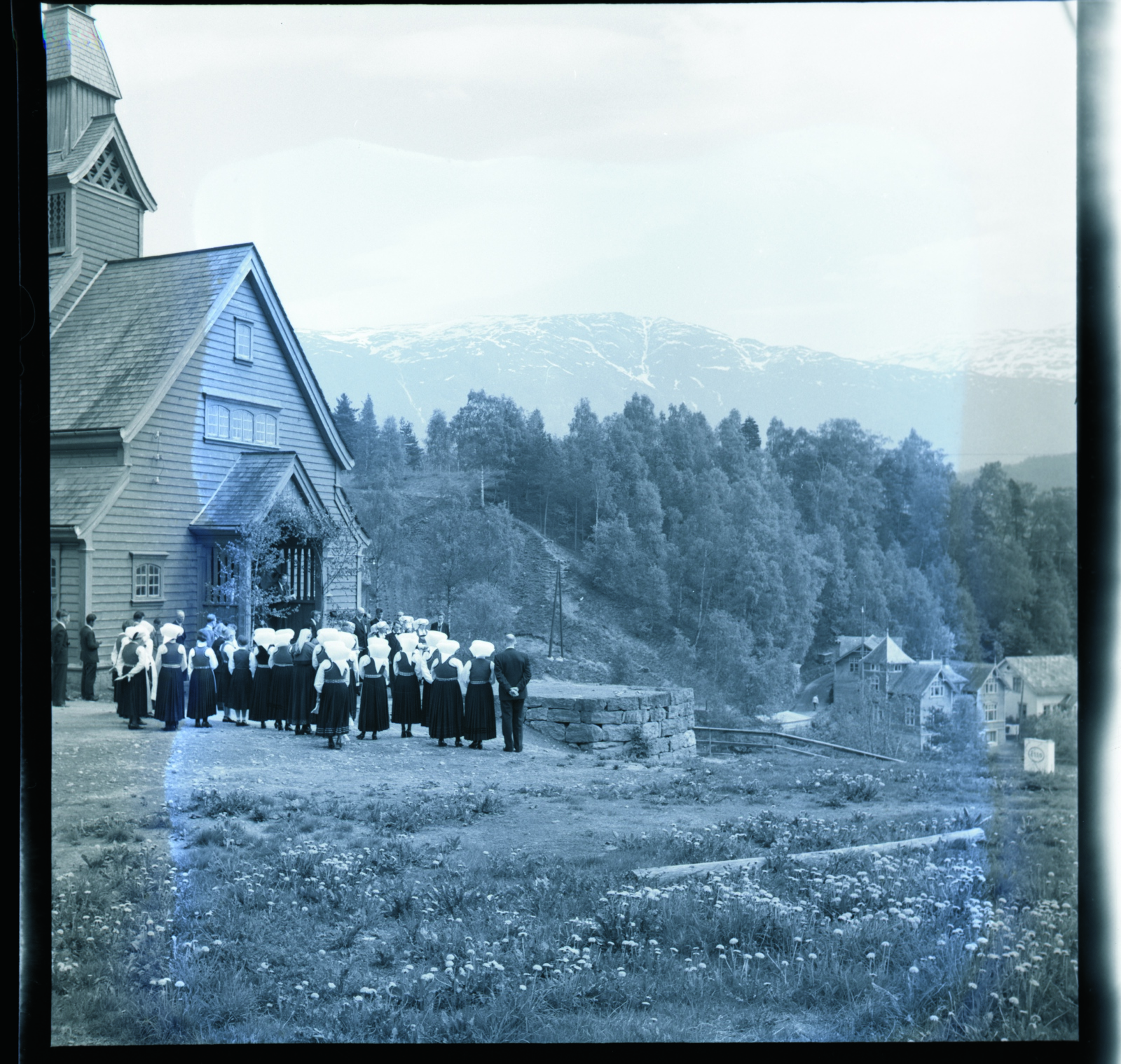
Wedding at the church in 1954

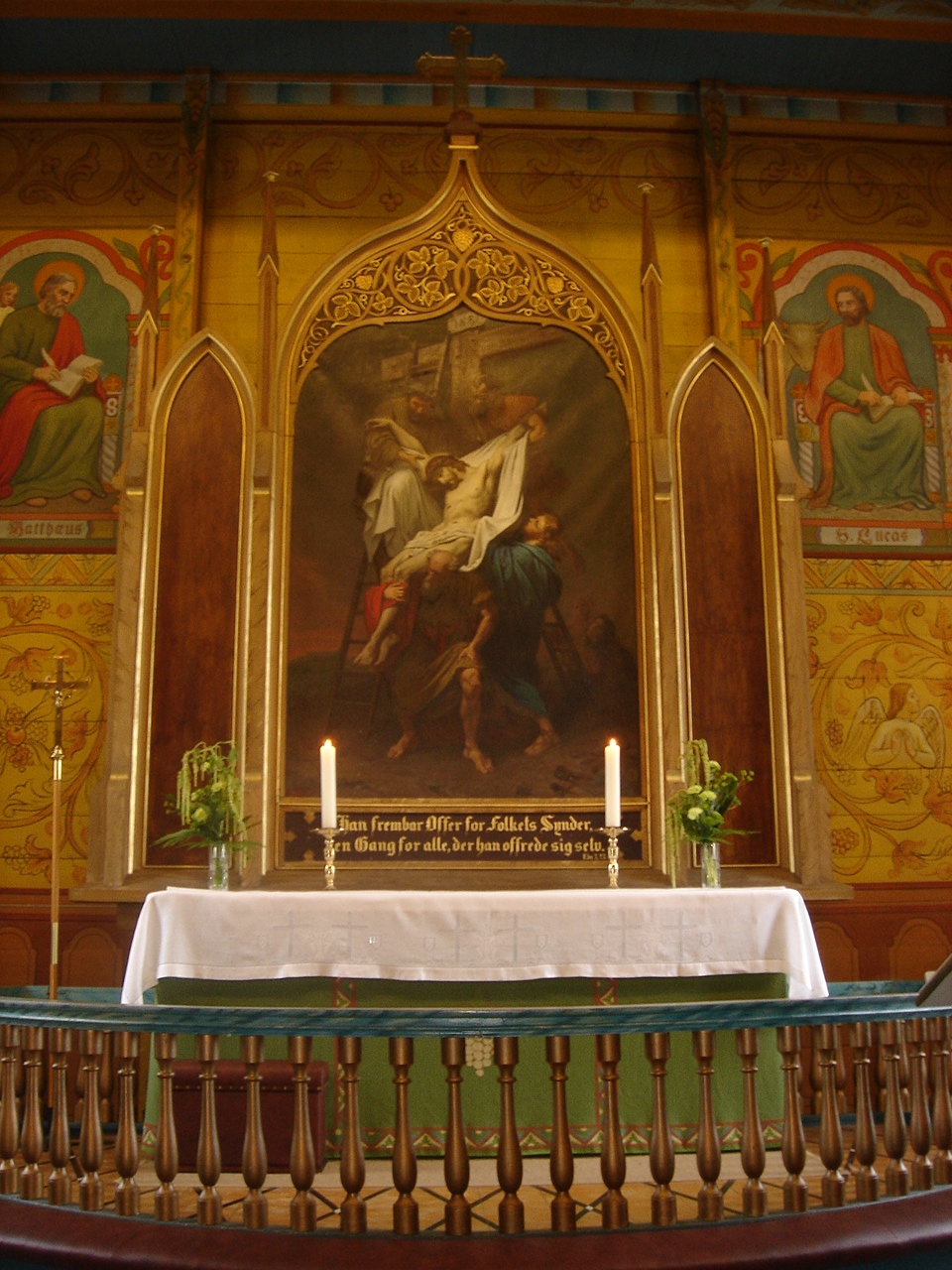
Altar and altar table

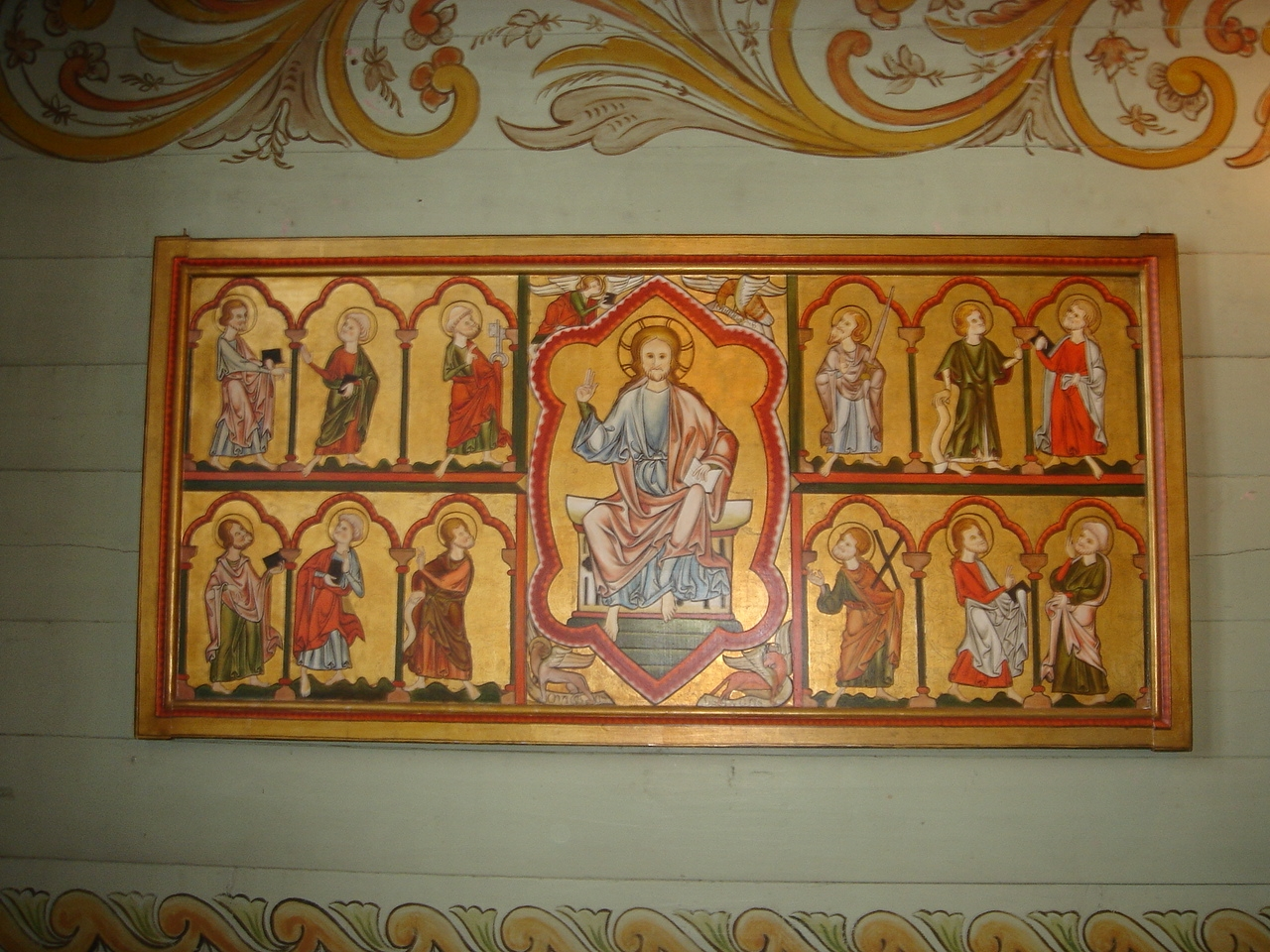
Wall painting (rosemaling above the painting)

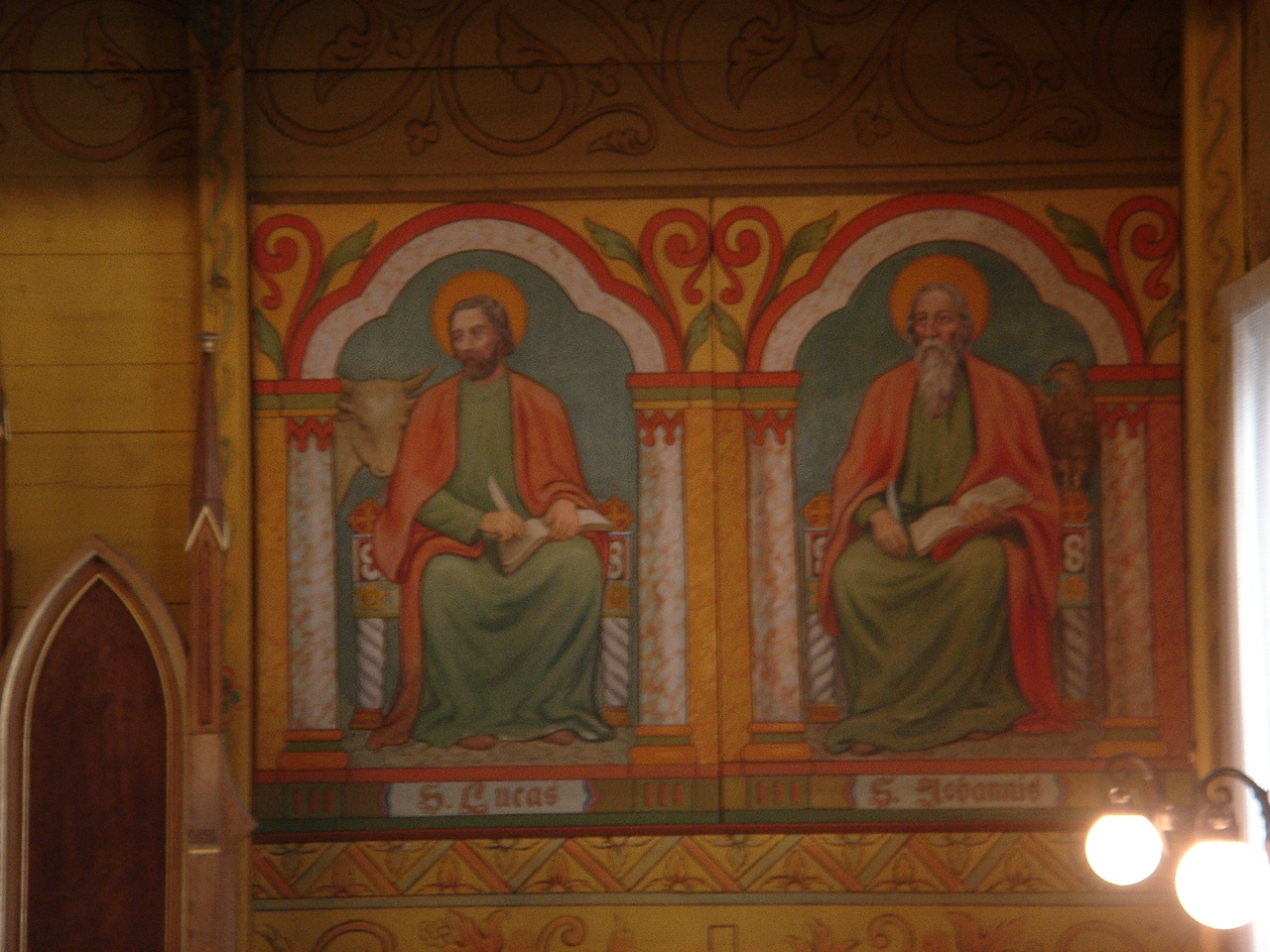
Wall painting

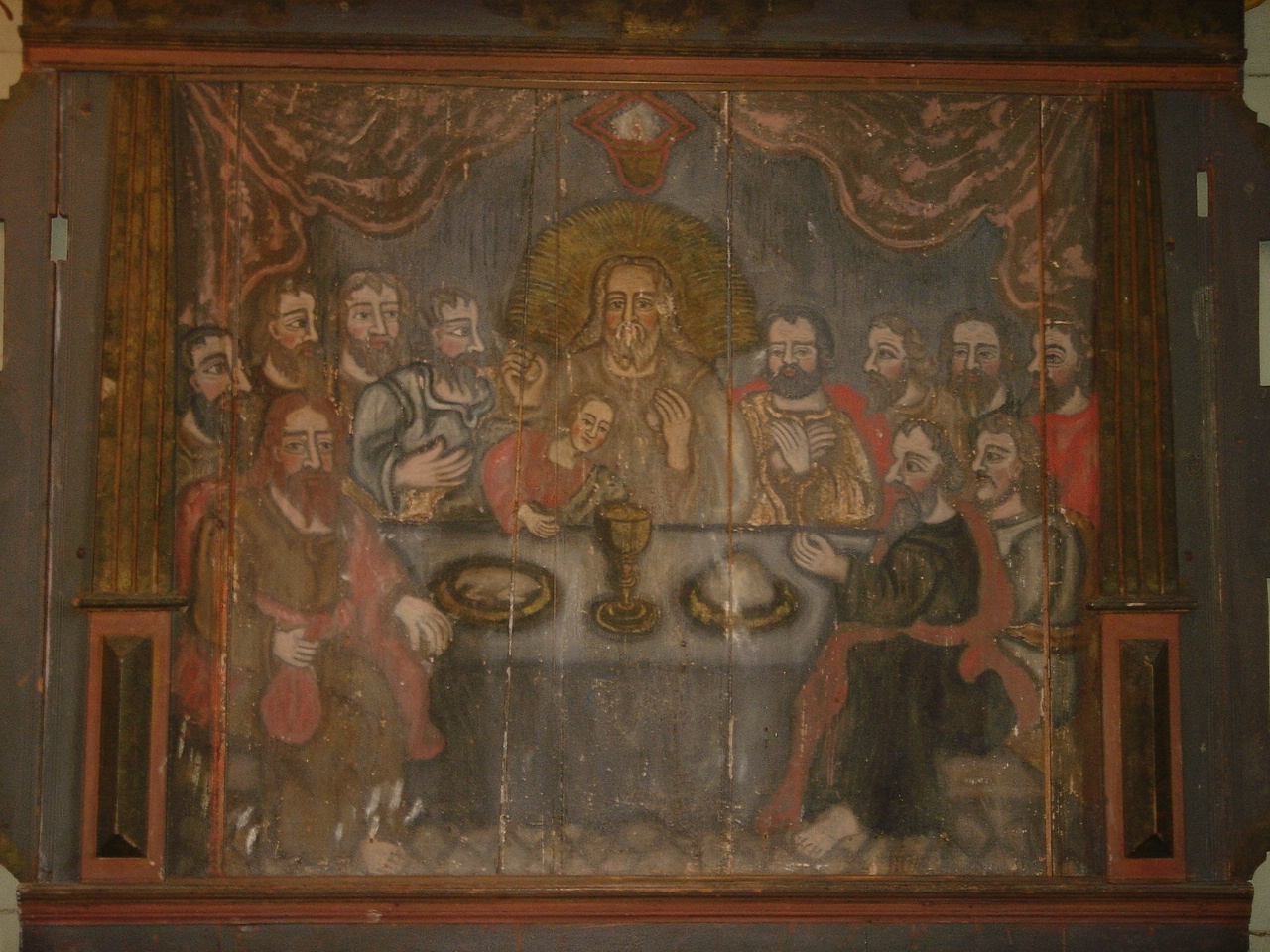
Old altarpiece (from 1630)

== See also ==
- List of churches in Bjørgvin
