= Eidfjord Church =

Church in Vestland, Norway

- Eidfjord kyrkje
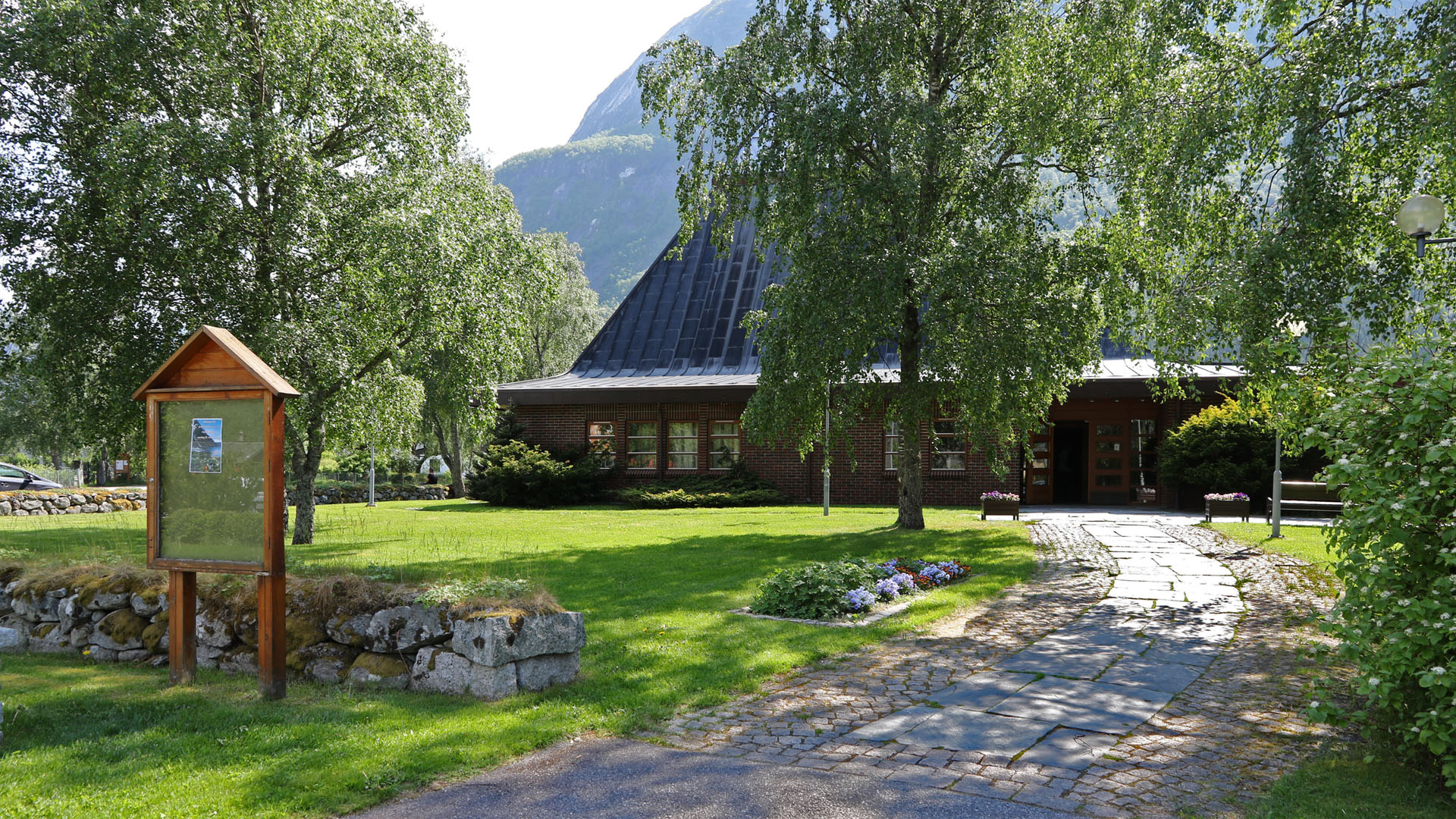
- View of the church
- Eidfjord Church
- 60°27′47″N 7°04′11″E
- Location: Eidfjord Municipality, Vestland
- Country: Norway
- Denomination: Church of Norway
- Churchmanship: Evangelical Lutheran

History
- Status: Parish church
- Founded: 1981
- Consecrated: 31 May 1981

Architecture
- Functional status: Active
- Architect: Sigurd Sekse
- Architectural type: Rectangular
- Groundbreaking: 1979
- Completed: 1981 (45 years ago)

Specifications
- Capacity: 375
- Materials: Brick and wood

Administration
- Diocese: Bjørgvin bispedømme
- Deanery: Hardanger og Voss prosti
- Parish: Eidfjord

Eidfjord Church (Norwegian: Eidfjord kyrkje) is a parish church of the Church of Norway in Eidfjord Municipality in Vestland county, Norway. It is located in the village of Eidfjord. It is the church for the Eidfjord parish which is part of the Hardanger og Voss prosti (deanery) in the Diocese of Bjørgvin. The modern-looking red brick church was built in a rectangular design in 1981 using plans drawn up by the architect Sigurd Sekse. The church seats about 375 people.

== History ==
The Old Eidfjord Church was used for over 700 years by the people of Eidfjord before being replaced with a new church. By the 1970s, the parish decided to build a new church. Sigurd Sekse was hired to design the new building. Construction began in 1979 and it was completed in stages. The final stage of the new building was completed in early 1981. The new church was consecrated on 31 May 1981. The brick church building has an almost square floor plan and a sloping, pyramid-shaped roof. After the completion of this new church, the old church, which seats about 100 people, is no longer used for regular services, but it is still used on special occasions.

== See also ==
- List of churches in Bjørgvin
