= Kristofer McNeeley =

American actor

- Born: September 24, 1974 (age 50); Oklahoma City, Oklahoma
- Occupation(s): Stage, film, television actor, producer

Kristofer McNeeley (born September 24, 1974, in Oklahoma City, Oklahoma) is an American stage, film and television actor and producer.

McNeeley's television credits include Birds of Prey, That's Life, Days of Our Lives, and Neurotic Tendencies. Stage includes Jersey Boys (Las Vegas Company & the San Francisco holiday return engagement cast) and James Joyce's The Dead.

He currently resides in Vancouver, British Columbia.
