= Ulvik (village) =

Village in Ulvik Municipality, Norway

- Village
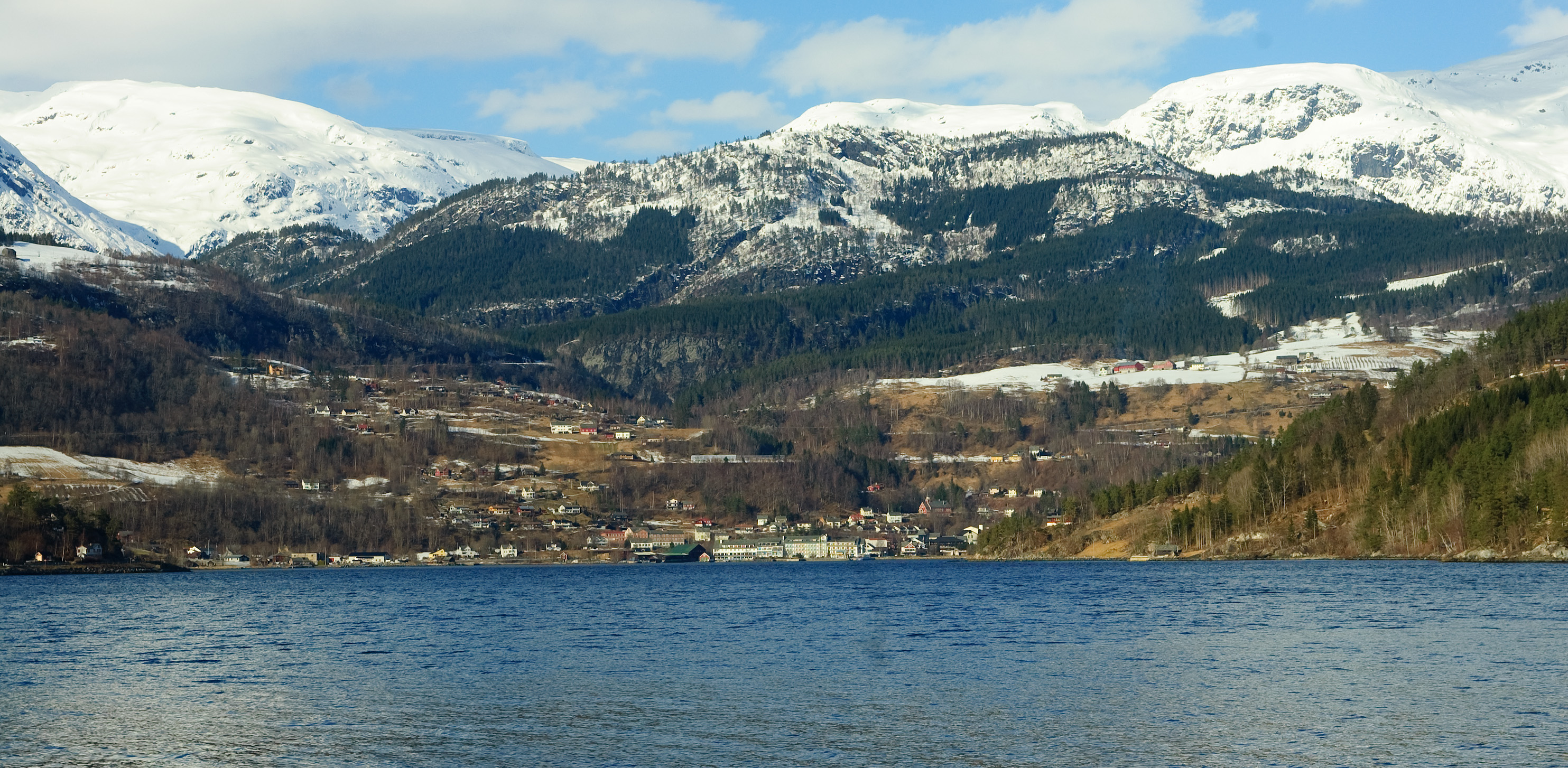
- View of the village
- Interactive map of Ulvik
- Coordinates: 60.56791°N 6.91645°E
- Country: Norway
- Region: Western Norway
- County: Vestland
- District: Hardanger
- Municipality: Ulvik Municipality

Area
  - Total: 0.61 km^{2} (0.24 sq mi)
- Elevation: 10 m (33 ft)

Population (2025)
  - Total: 542
  - Density: 889/km^{2} (2,300/sq mi)
- Time zone: UTC+01:00 (CET)
  - Summer (DST): UTC+02:00 (CEST)
- Post Code: 5730 Ulvik

Ulvik is a village in Ulvik Municipality which is located in Vestland county, Norway. The village sits at the end of the Ulvikafjorden, a side arm off of the main Hardangerfjord. The village lies about 15 kilometres (9.3 mi) north of the Hardanger Bridge and about 30 kilometres (19 mi) east of the village of Vossavangen.

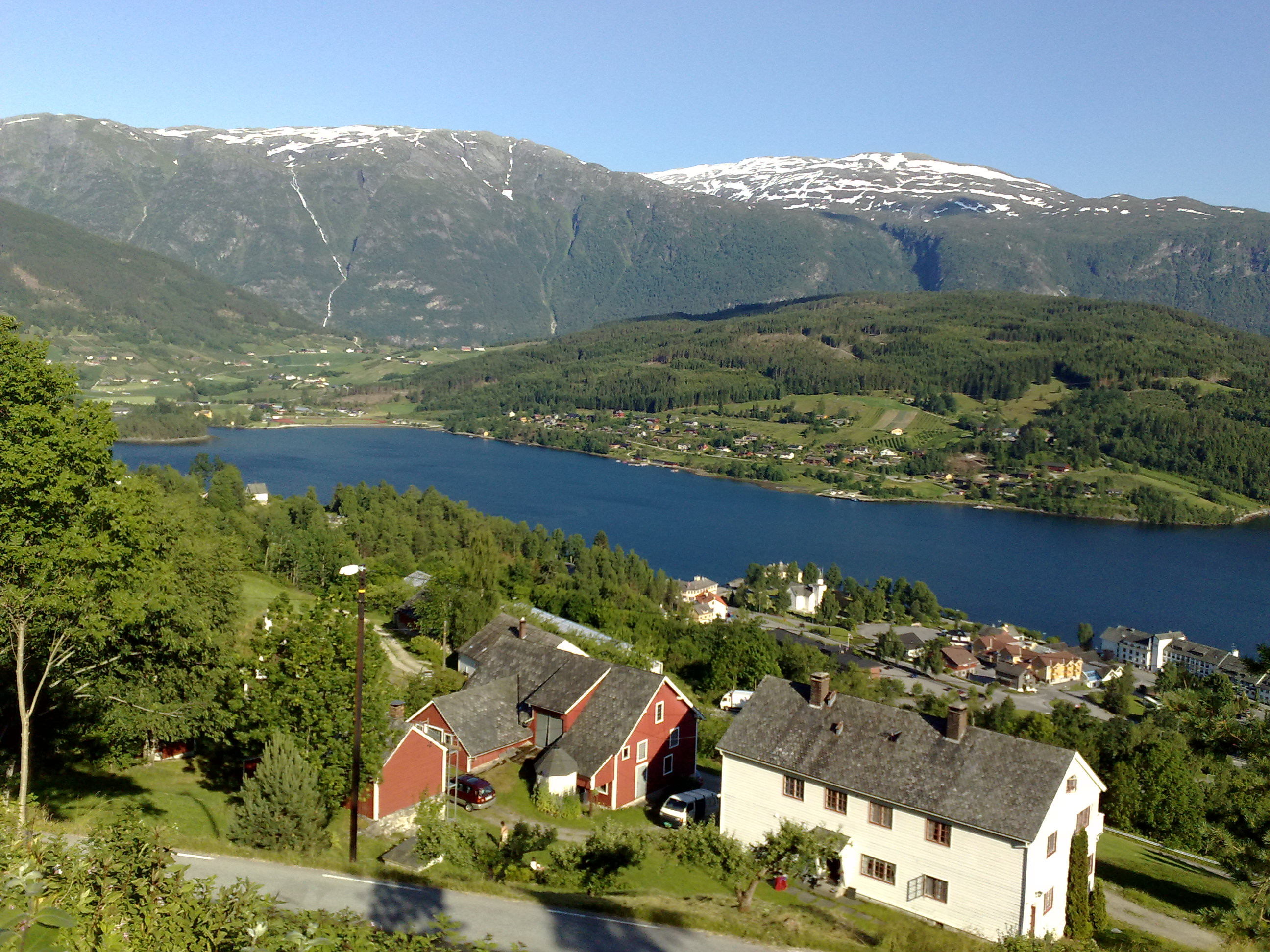
View of Brakanes in the foreground along the fjord

The 0.61-square-kilometre (150-acre) village has a population (2025) of 542 and a population density of 889 inhabitants per square kilometre (2,300/sq mi).

The centre of the village is called "Brakanes" and it is located at the mouth of the river Tysso. This is the downtown part of the village and it includes most of the commercial areas including a cinema as well as Ulvik Church, the only church in the municipality. Brakanes School is a primary and lower secondary school (and the only school in Ulvik). The school has about 150 students that attend there.

== History ==
The village centre of Ulvik was burned by the Germans in April 1940, as retaliation to having been hindered by Norwegian resistance fighters who were landing in Ulvik. In total, 56 houses were burned. The following day, the population, mainly farmers, were chased away from their homes, not being able to return for several months. The village was rebuilt after the war, with the hotel reopening in 1952.
