= Voss Line =

Railway line in Vestland, Norway

Coordinates: 60.6380°N 5.9582°E

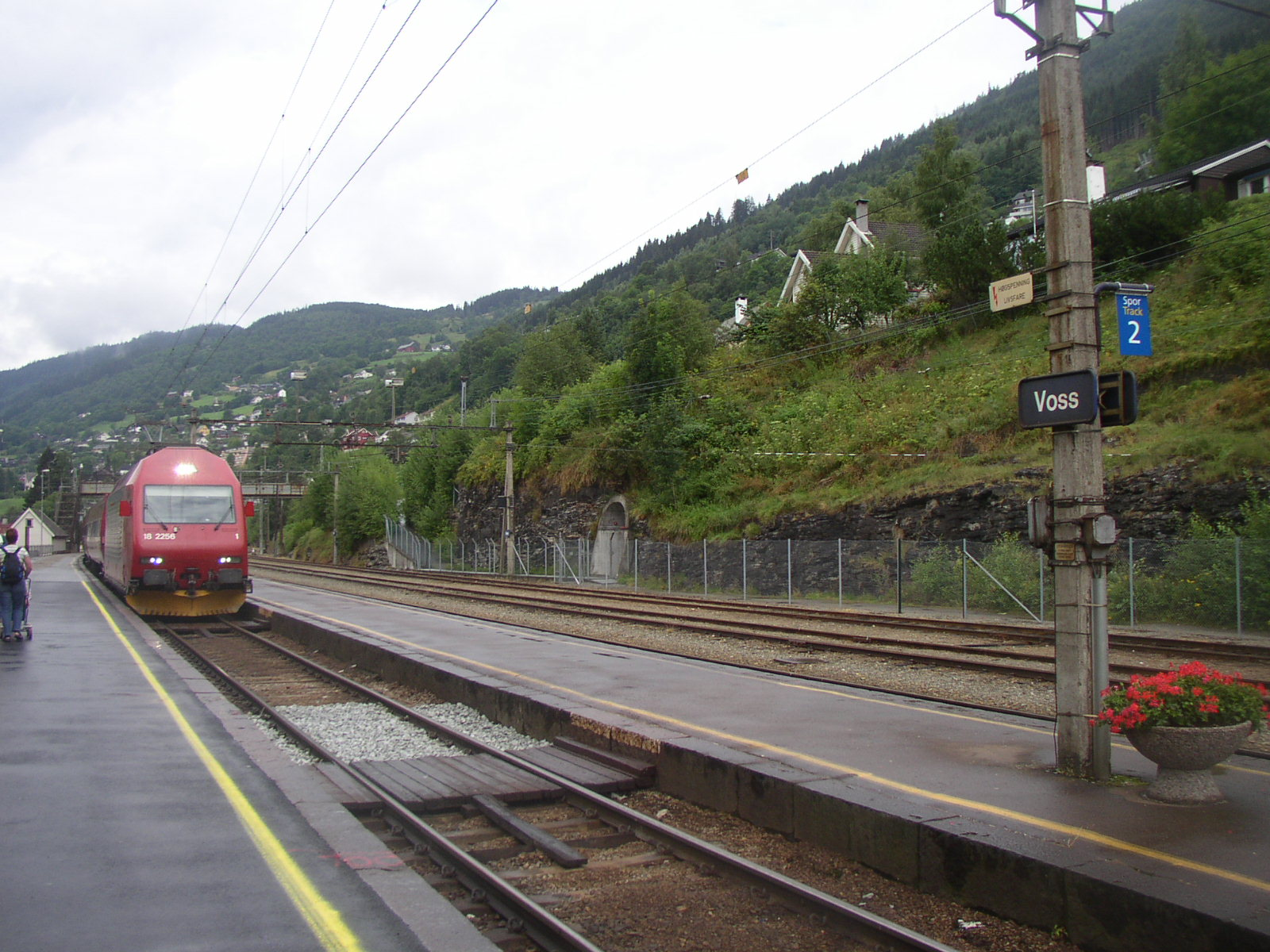
- Longhaul NSB El 18 locomotive at Voss Station

Overview
- Native name: Vossebanen
- Status: Merged with the Bergen Line
- Owner: Norwegian State Railways
- Termini: Hønefoss; Bergen
- Stations: 39

Service
- Type: Railway
- System: Norwegian railway
- Operator(s): Norwegian State Railways

History
- Opened: 11 July 1883

Technical
- Line length: 106.7 kilometres (66.3 mi)
- Number of tracks: Single
- Character: Passenger and freight
- Track gauge: 1,435 mm (4 ft 8 1/2 in) standard gauge
- Old gauge: 1,067 mm (3 ft 6 in)
- Electrification: 15 kV 16.7 Hz AC

The Voss Line (Norwegian: Vossebanen) is a railway line from Bergen to Vossevangen in Vestland, Norway. It opened on 11 July 1883 and was extended to Oslo as the Bergen Line on 27 November 1909. It was built as 1,067 mm (3 ft 6 in) narrow gauge, but converted to 1,435 mm (4 ft 8 1/2 in) standard gauge with the connection with the Bergen Line. It was electrified in 1954, and shortened by the Ulriken Tunnel in 1963.

In addition to carrying long-haul passenger and freight trains on the Bergen Line, it is the main part of Bergen Commuter Rail. The Old Voss Line, the section from Arna to Bergen, has become a heritage railway.

== History ==
The first documented idea of building a railway between Norway's two largest cities was launched by Voss forest supervisor Hans Gløersen on 24 August 1871 in the Bergensposten newspaper. He suggested building the railway via Voss and Hallingdal to connect with the Krøderen Line. Back in 1866 he had launched the idea of the Jæren Line. Within days of the launch of the Bergen Line the city council had garnered support. In 1872 the railway director Carl Abraham Pihl and two engineers went on a survey tour to look at the suggested line. At the time it was common that proposals for railways came from local initiatives, and that local municipalities and private investors would then pay about 20% of the investments, the state covering the rest, mostly through foreign debt.

=== Political processes ===
On 20 October 1871 two engineers traversed the two possible routes from Bergen to Voss; via Fana, Os, and Hardangerfjord; and via Dale and Sørfjord. Though covering a less populated area, the latter would be cheaper to build, and have less elevation. A railway committee was created on 25 January 1872 with a limited mandate, which was increased on 20 December. At the same time there was a dispute between the Ministry of Labour and Pihl about whether to prioritize the Bergen Line, but in July 1872 surveys were performed in person by Pihl and two engineers, and their report was positive. At the same time he launched the idea of a branch line up Valdres to Lærdal.

By 1873 agreement had been reached as to the right-of-way to Voss, but not onwards towards Oslo. On 13 January 1874 Bergen city council started issuing stock for the Voss Line, and to begin with 400,000 Norwegian speciedaler (NOK 1.6 million) was issued. In the 1873 parliamentary election railway supporter Peter Jebsen was elected, spending the next few years furiously defending the railway. Parliament did not endorse new railway projects in the 1874 session, instead making a complete plan for all railway construction, to be proposed by a committee. When the report was launched on 20 March 1875, the Voss Line was not included since it could not show a higher profitability than 1%. During the 1875 session there was not a majority for the Voss Line, partially due to the lack of capital available for local investors. This was based on a claim from Johan Jørgen Schwartz, the chairman of the committee, that the investment costs were underestimated. This was countered by Nils Henrik Bruun, a constructor from Bergen, who was willing to construct all the tunnels for less than the budgeted sum. When Jebsen in addition was willing to act as personal guarantor for Bruun in case of his death, the majority in the parliament shifted. On 9 June 1875 parliament voted 61 to 42 to build the line.

=== Construction ===
The line was built to narrow gauge, 1,067 mm (3 ft 6 in). Construction started in December 1875, while the largest part started in March 1876. During the winter the engineers had made final adjustments to the plans. At any given time at least 800 men worked on construction, and at the peak 1,800 men were employed. They worked 12 hours per day, for which they had a daily wage of NOK 2.55, the highest wage for navvies in the country. To a large extent the labor came from Sweden, who had just finished the Norway/Vänern Line and had an excess of skilled labor for construction. This import of labor had the effect of pumping money into the local economy, and several taverns were built along the line. There were some accidents, and several deaths among the workers.

Construction finished in 1882 and some test services began, though not scheduled until the spring of 1883. Official opening was on 11 July 1883. Many of the navvies settled near the line, and started working for the Norwegian State Railways as part of the operation.

=== Merger ===
On 27 November 1909 the Bergen Line opened from Voss to Hønefoss, and the Voss Line lost its independent status. The Bergen Line was built to standard gauge, so the line from Bergen to Voss had to be converted for the opening of the Bergen Line. This was especially challenging because of the continuous traffic on the line, with 36 departures per day to Nesttun, six to Garnes and four to Voss. In preparation a few curves had to be straightened, the tunnels widened and the bridges strengthened. On the night of 10/11 August 1904 all the track was changed and in the morning the trains could operate on standard gauge to Voss.

=== White coal across white plains ===
Norway is a country with abundance of hydroelectricity and NSB saw huge amounts of money burned with imported coal. Plans for electrification of the line are as old as the railway itself, and in 1912 the line from Nesttun to Bergen was proposed electrified and doubled, having seen the Thamshavn Line open with electric traction in 1908. During the planning of the Hardanger Line and the Flåm Line during the 1930s the suggestion again arose, and both the branch lines were built with electric traction, but not the main line. Counter suggestions were raised proposing a conversion to the locomotives running on oil or coal dust. In 1939 a plan for national electrification was launched, and the Voss Line was top priority. But the outbreak of World War II set the plans back, and not until the 1950s was it again possible to afford such investments. Electric traction came into use on 2 July 1954.

=== Through the first mountain ===
The first 32 kilometres (20 mi) from Bergen to Takvam went a very roundabout way, and it was clear that it would be possible to reduce the line by 21 kilometres (13 mi) with the construction of Ulriken Tunnel (7,660 metres or 25,130 feet), Arnanipa Tunnel (2,177 metres or 7,142 feet) and Tunestveit Tunnel (40 metres or 130 feet). The idea was approved by parliament in 1956, based on private financing from the businessman Fritz Rieber. Construction started in 1959 with the tunnels being finished in 1963 while the tracks were finished laid on 29 May 1964 when the first train entered the tunnel.

== Commuter rail ==
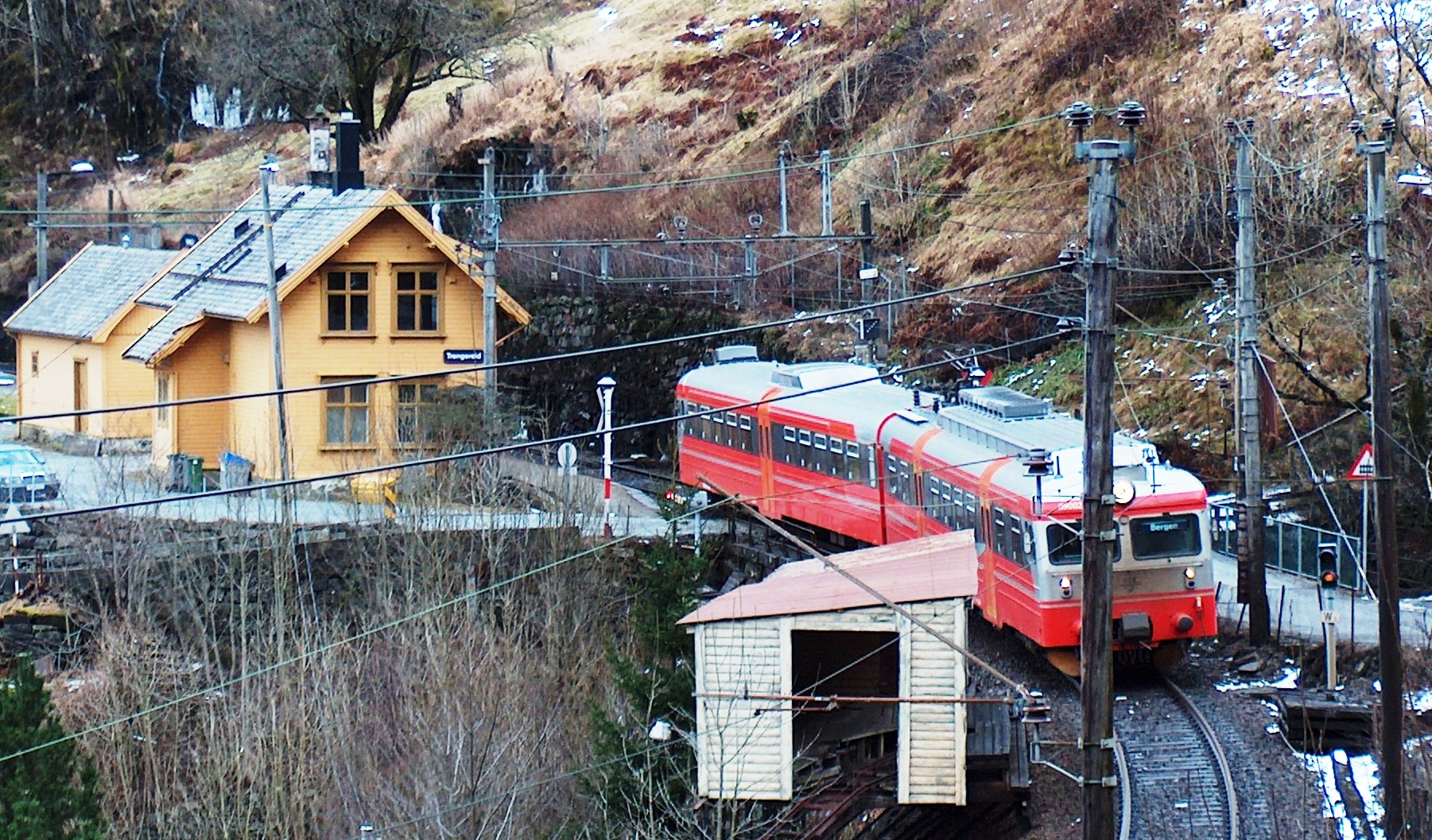
An NSB Type 69 passing Trengereid Station

NSB operates a commuter rail service from Bergen with departures every 15 minutes to Arna plus 14 daily departures to Voss, of which up to six continue to Myrdal. Rolling stock is Class 69 multiple units. The first part to Arna represents an important part of the public transport in Bergen, since the rail line through the Ulriken mountains is considerably faster than driving around.

== Heritage ==
Parts of the closed sections of the line, from Midttun to Garnes, has been converted to a heritage railway—the Old Voss Line—that is operated with steam trains by the Norwegian Railway Club during the summer.

The Flåm Line branch has been converted to a tourist route. The railway has spectacular scenery and a vertical descent of 864 metres (2,835 ft) or 5.5% along the 20 kilometres (12 mi) route from Myrdal to Flåm. It is operated by NSB, but marketed by Flåm Utvikling. El 17 locomotives haul B3 carriages, all painted green.

== See also ==
- Narrow gauge railways in Norway
