= Vaksdal Station =

Railway station in Vaksdal, Norway

Vaksdal
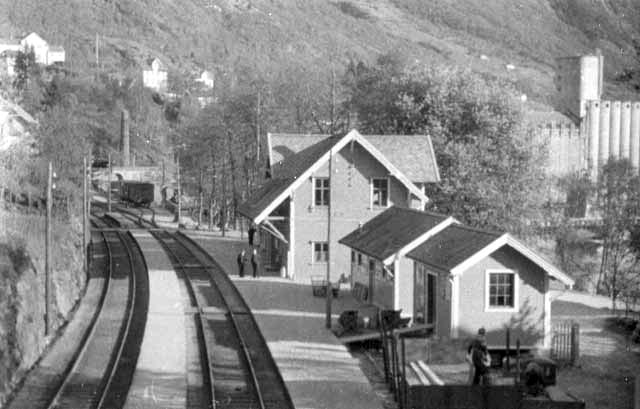

General information
- Location: Vaksdal, Vaksdal Municipality; Norway
- Coordinates: 60.478554°N 5.735513°E
- Elevation: 16.0 m (52.5 ft)
- Owner: Bane NOR
- Operator: Vy Tog
- Line: Bergen Line
- Distance: 440.53 km (273.73 mi)
- Platforms: 2

History
- Opened: 1883
Location

Vaksdal Station (Norwegian: Vaksdal stasjon) is a railway station located in the village of Vaksdal in Vaksdal Municipality in Vestland county, Norway. The station is located along the Bergen Line. The station is served by twelve daily departures per direction by the Bergen Commuter Rail operated by Vy Tog, as well by the night train to Oslo Central Station. The station opened in 1883 as part of the Voss Line.

The restaurant in the station was taken over by Norsk Spisevognselskap on 1 January 1924, and it was closed on 15 December 1935.

Preceding station			Following station
Bogegrend	Bergen Line		Stanghelle
Preceding station	Express trains		Following station
Arna	F4	Bergen–Oslo S	Dale
Preceding station	Local trains		Following station
Bogegrend		Bergen Commuter Rail	Stanghelle
