= Takvam Station =

Former railway station in Bergen, Norway

Takvam
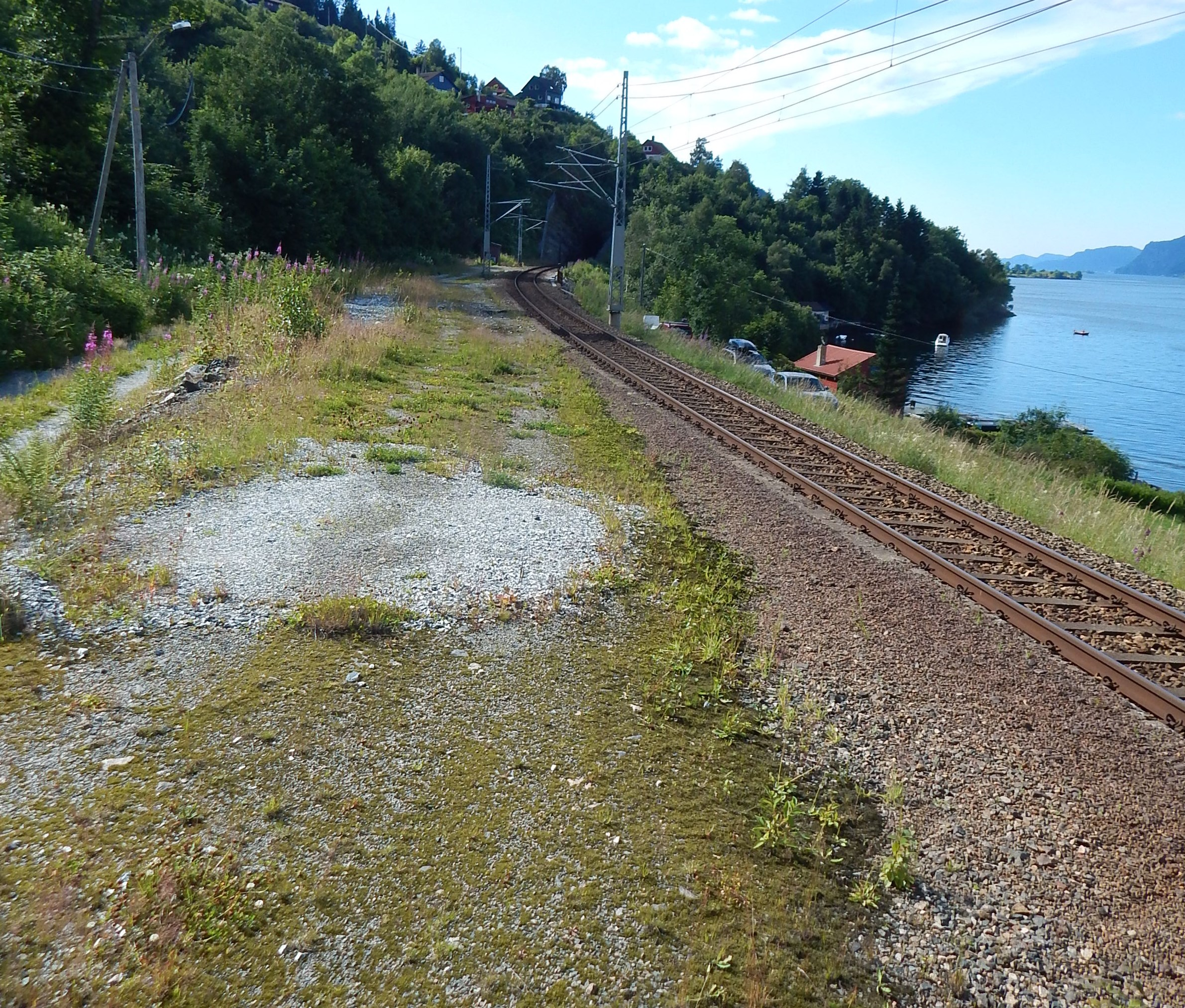

General information
- Location: Indre Takkvam, Bergen Municipality; Norway
- Coordinates: 60°25′15″N 5°31′20″E
- Line: Bergensbanen
- Distance: 458.63 kilometres (284.98 mi)
- Platforms: 1

History
- Opened: 1966
- Closed: 2012
Location

Takvam Station (Norwegian: Takvam holdeplass) was a railway station located in the village of Indre Takkvam in Bergen Municipality, Norway. It was closed on 9 December 2012. Prior to closure, the station was served by two daily departures per direction by the Bergen Commuter Rail operated by Norges Statsbaner. The station opened in 1966, replacing the former Herland Station.

Preceding station		Following station
Arna	Bergensbanen	Trengereid
