= Andreas Tanberg Gløersen =

Norwegian forest manager

Hans Andreas Tanberg Gløersen (16 February 1836 – 1 September 1904) was a Norwegian forest manager.

== Biography ==
He was born at Nordre Aurdal in Oppland as a son of physician Jørgen Gustav Gløersen (1806–1884) and Gunda Sophie Cathrine Tanberg (1811–1899). He took his examen artium in 1853. He gained a cand.jur. in 1858, followed by a degree in forestry at the University of Giessen in 1860.

Gløersen was appointed as a forestry assistant in Lesja Municipality in the same year. In 1864 he was sent to Western Norway to assess its forests. From 1866 to 1895 he worked for the Ministry of Interior (Indredepartementet) as the forest manager for a region which included parts of the present-day counties of Agder, Rogaland, and Vestland. He pioneered in the field of forest cultivation. He purchased forested land and established several tree nurseries.

He edited the magazine Landbrugstidende for Vestlandet from 1885 to 1891. Gløersen also wrote a number of articles in newspapers and journals, primarily about the forestry and related questions. He has been credited for launching the ideas for the Jæren Line railway at a public meeting in 1866, and the Voss Line through a letter to the editor in Bergensposten. In both cases he provided detailed suggestions for the route, ideas that to a great extent were followed when the lines were constructed.

From February 1868 he was married to Rachel Marie Carlsen (1846–1894). After his wife died, Gløersen moved to Kristiania (now Oslo). He was decorated with the Royal Norwegian Order of St. Olav in 1895, and died in Kristiania in September 1904.
