= Dale Station =

Railway station in Vaksdal, Norway

Dale
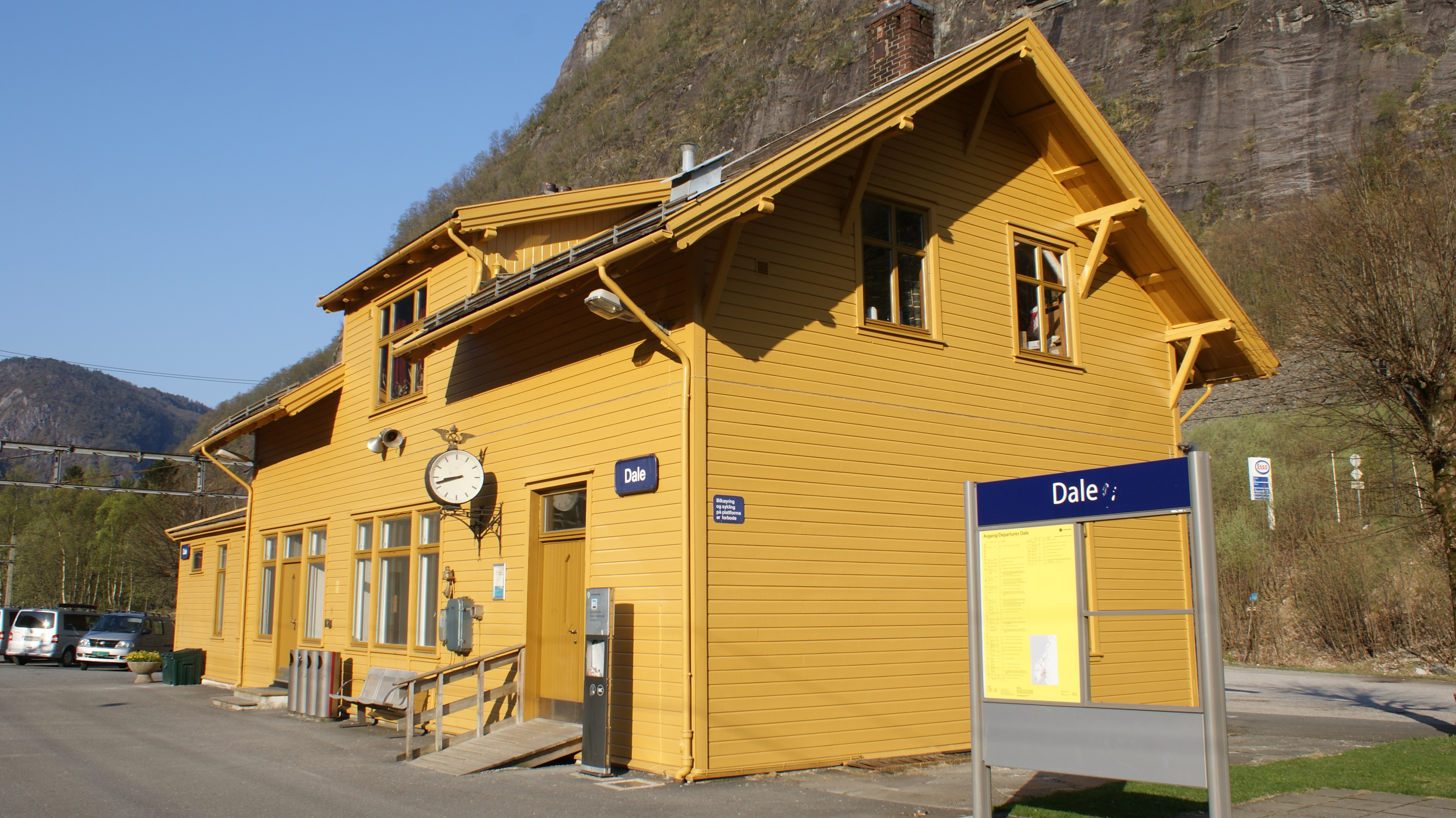

General information
- Location: Dale, Vaksdal Municipality; Norway
- Coordinates: 60.586504°N 5.816295°E
- Elevation: 43.4 m (142 ft)
- Owner: Bane NOR
- Operator: Vy Tog
- Line: Bergen Line
- Distance: 425.29 km
- Platforms: 2

History
- Opened: 1883
Location

Dale Station (Norwegian: Dale stasjon) is a railway station located in the village of Dale in Vaksdal Municipality in Vestland county, Norway. The station is served by twelve daily departures per direction by the Bergen Commuter Rail operated by Vy Tog, as well by some express trains the night train to Oslo S. The station opened in 1883 as part of Vossebanen.

Preceding station			Following station
Stanghelle	Bergen Line		Bolstadøyri
Preceding station	Express trains		Following station
Vaksdal	F4	Bergen–Oslo S	Voss
Preceding station	Local trains		Following station
Stanghelle		Bergen Commuter Rail	Bolstadøyri
