= Trengereid Station =

Railway station in Bergen, Norway

Trengereid
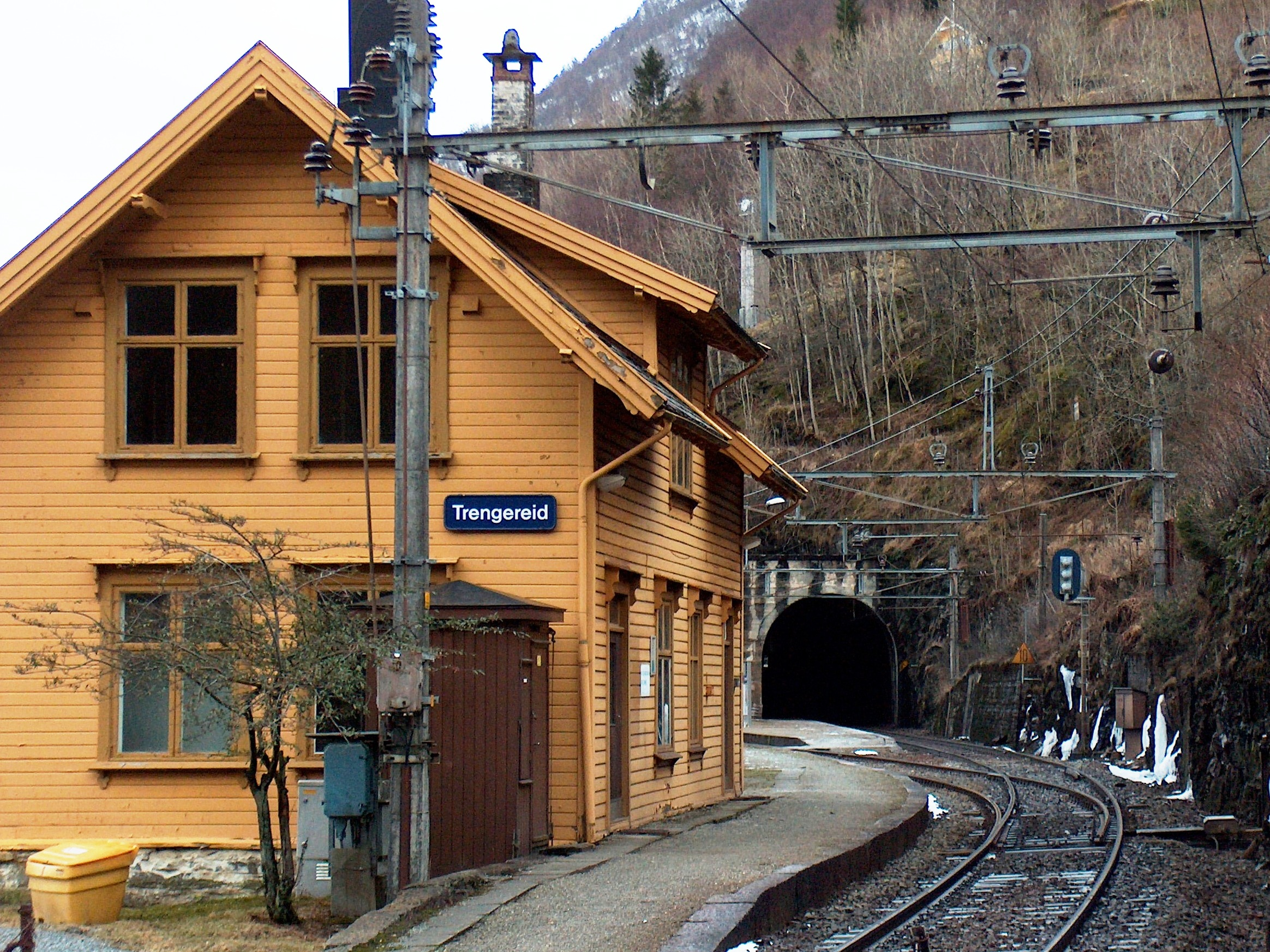
- Trengereid station. The entrance to the mainline tunnel can be seen in the background.

General information
- Location: Arna, Bergen Municipality; Norway
- Coordinates: 60°25′58″N 5°38′13″E
- Elevation: 15.7 metres (52 ft)
- Owner: Bane NOR
- Operator: Vy Tog
- Line: Bergen Line
- Platforms: 2

Construction
- Architect: Balthazar Lange

History
- Opened: 1883
Location

Trengereid Station is railway station on the Bergen Line. It is located in the village of Trengereid in Bergen Municipality in Vestland county, Norway. The station is in the borough of Arna on the shore of the Sørfjorden. The station is located at an elevation of 15.7 metres (52 ft) above sea level between Takvam Station and Bogegrend Station.

== Overview ==
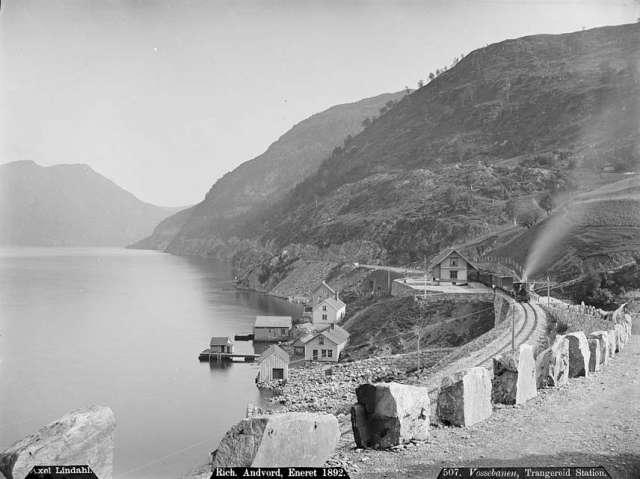
Dated 1883-90

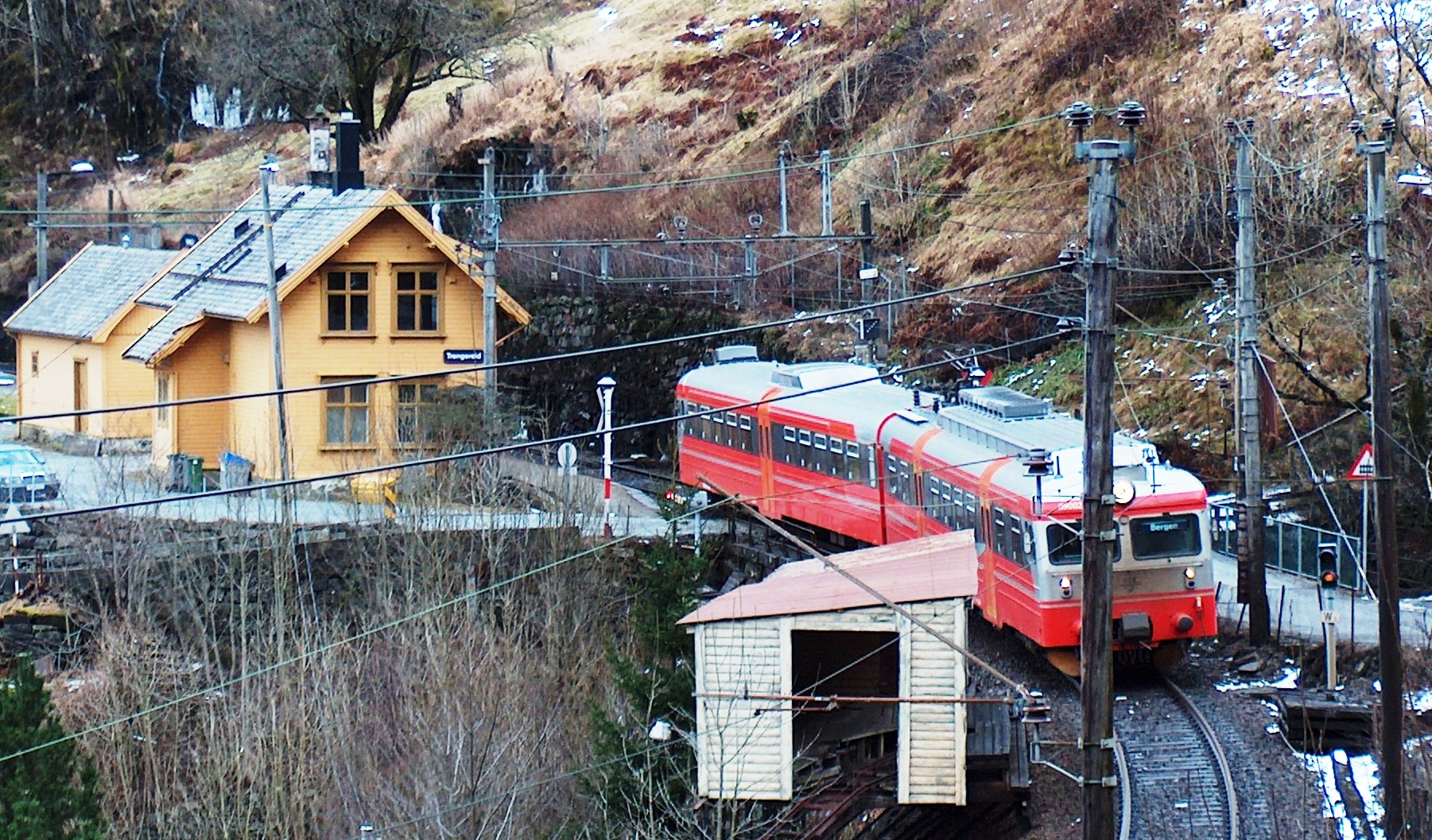
A NSB BM69 train at Trengereid.

The station was opened when the Bergen-Voss railway line Vossebanen was opened in 1883.

To the south of the station, up on the mountain slope, is the small Trengereid residential neighborhood. Below the station, facing the fjord on the north are the old Trengereid factories, service buildings and docking facilities.

The station is served by all local trains running between Voss and Bergen's main railway station, but express trains do not stop here.

The track layout at Trengereid is somewhat unusual. Originally, the station had only a single track, the topography at the site, with a steep slope to the south and a body of water to the north, made it difficult to add a second track. The line eastwards went in a curve around the mountain shelf. In 1955 a second track was added at the station by building a tunnel on the east side of the station, this became the main line. The station has two platforms, but only the platform next to the tunnel, where trains can stop without blocking the single track part of the platform, is in use for embarking and disembarking. The station building was designed by Balthazar Lange.

Preceding station		Following station
Takvam	Bergen Line	Bogegrend
Preceding station	Local trains	Following station
Takvam	Bergen Commuter Rail	Bogegrend
