= Johan Jørgen Schwartz =

Norwegian politician and businessman

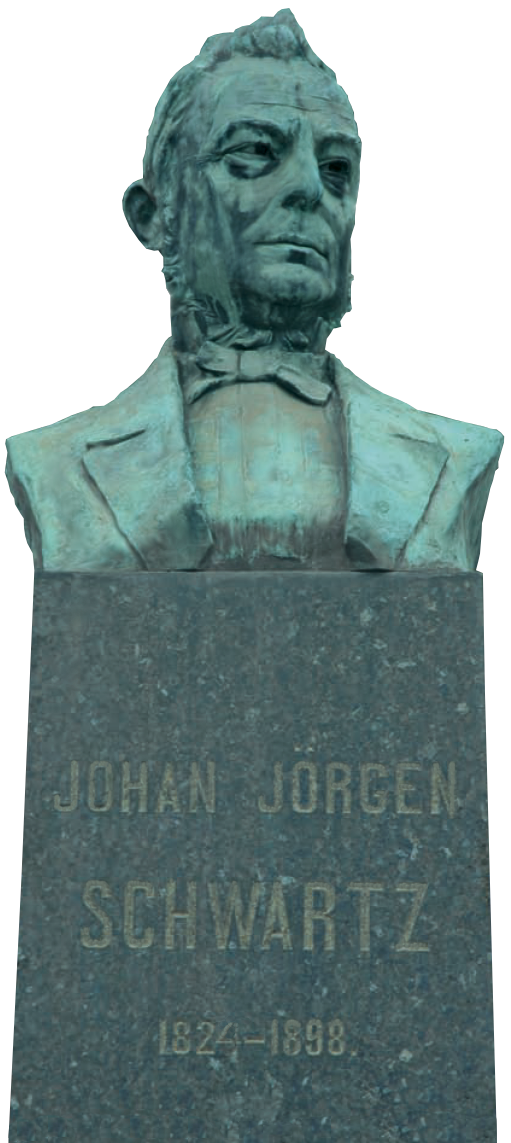
Johan Jørgen Schwartz

Johan Jørgen Schwartz (19 February 1824 – 17 March 1898) was a Norwegian politician and businessperson.

Schwartz was born at Drammen in Buskerud, Norway. He was the son of Hans Jürgen Schwartz (1785–1844) and Marie Cathrine Wærner (1803–89). He attended to Drammen Latin School. Schwartz first worked as a merchant in Drammen. He started its own company in 1848 and expanded it into one of the city's largest sawmills, timber trade and shipping company.

He was the mayor of Drammen (1862–1866). He sat in the Norwegian Parliament as part of the conservative wing between the period (1857–1876). He was a supporter of railways, and was active in passing Randsfjordbanen, Drammenbanen, Jarlsbergbanen and Vossebanen. He was also director of Norges Bank in Drammen. Schwartz was a co-owner of Eidsfos Verk (1873–79). After an economic crisis, he went bankrupt in 1879 and retired from public business. His son, Paul Lassen Schwartz (1853–1922), joined the company which bought the ironworks at Eidsfoss out of bankruptcy in 1891.
