= Ulriken Tunnel =

Railway tunnel in Bergen, Norway

Coordinates: 60.397°N 5.412°E

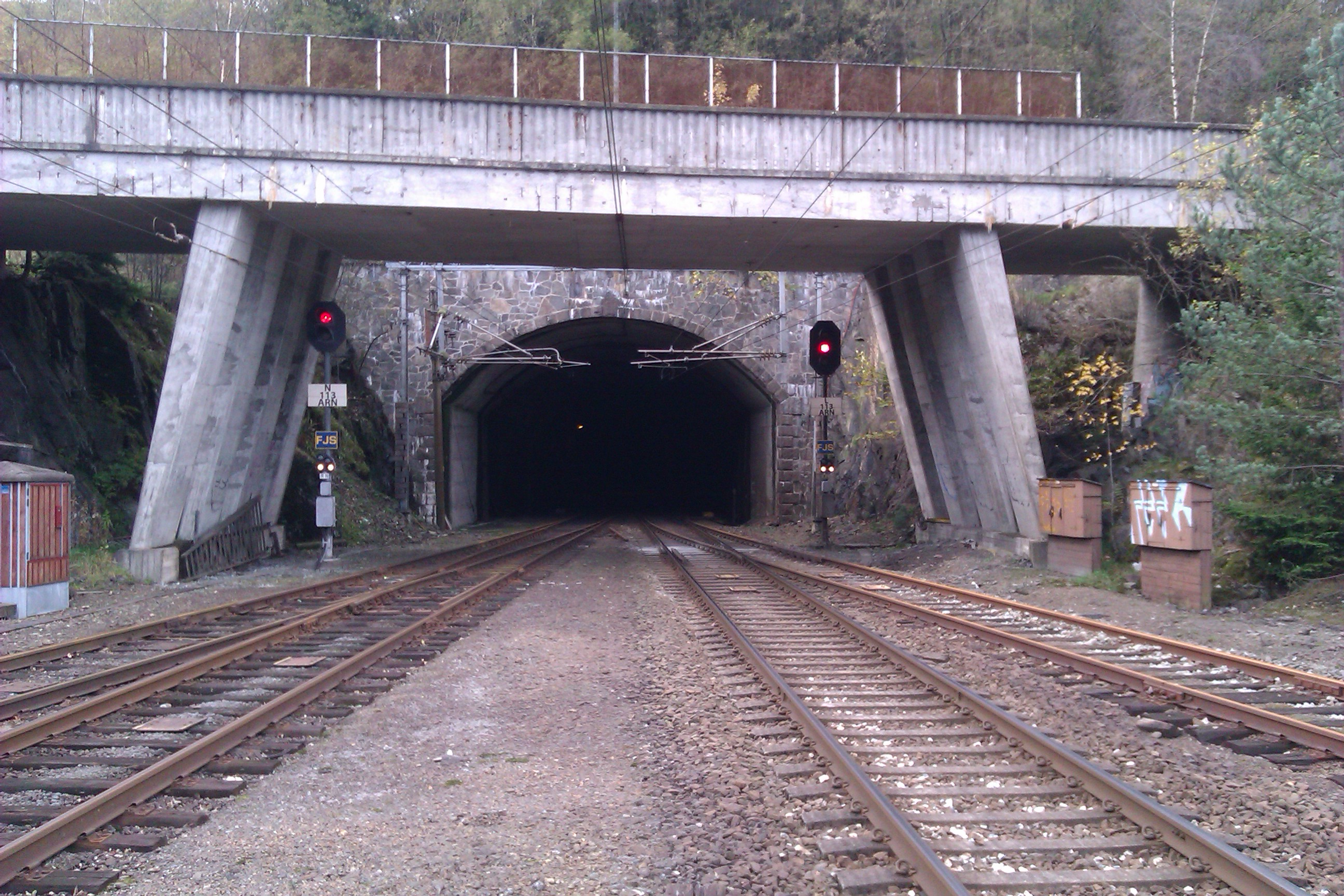
- Entrance from Arna Station
- Interactive map of Ulriken Tunnel

Overview
- Line: Bergen Line
- Location: Bergen Municipality, Norway
- Status: In use
- System: Norwegian railway
- Start: Arna Station
- End: Bergen Station

Operation
- Opened: 1964
- Owner: Bane NOR
- Operator: Vy Tog; CargoNet

Technical
- Line length: 7,670 metres (4.8 mi)
- No. of tracks: Double track
- Track gauge: 1,435 mm (4 ft 8 1/2 in)
- Electrified: 15 kV 16.7 Hz AC
- Operating speed: New Tunnel: 160 km/h (100 mph); Old Tunnel: 130 km/h (81 mph)

The Ulriken Tunnel (Norwegian: Ulrikstunnelen) is a double-track railway tunnel on the Bergen Line between Bergen Station and Arna Station in Bergen Municipality in Vestland county, Norway.

== Original (old) tunnel ==
The existing 7,670-metre (25,160 ft)-long tunnel runs under the northern part of the mountain Ulriken in Bergen Municipality. Before the tunnel was opened in 1964, the Bergen Line ran via Nesttun. This stretch is now a heritage railway, the Old Voss Line. The tunnel has single track and is electrified.

== New tunnel ==
The Norwegian National Rail Administration has plans for building a second tunnel through the mountain. Work on boring the 7.7 km (4.8 mi) tunnel began in January 2016 and it is the first in Norway to use a tunnel boring machine. On August 29, 2017, infrastructure manager Bane Nor and contractors Strabag and Skanska completed the boring of the new tunnel. The next step was to cut out 16 crossings between the new and old tunnels, and to make the tunnel ready for use by railway traffic. The new double-track tunnel was opened in December 2020.
