= Bogegrend Station =

Railway station in Vestland, Norway

Bogegrend

General information
- Location: Bogo, Vaksdal Municipality; Norway
- Coordinates: 60°27′49″N 5°44′25″E
- Line: Bergensbanen
- Distance: 442.36 km
- Platforms: 1

History
- Opened: 1938
Location

Bogegrend Station (Norwegian: Bogegrend holdeplass) is a small railway station located in the village of Bogo in Vaksdal Municipality in Vestland county, Norway. The station was served by two daily departures per direction by the Bergen Commuter Rail until its closure in 2012. The station opened in 1938, and there is no road access to the station, only a walking pathway that leads from the station to the residential area of the village.

Preceding station		Following station
Trengereid	Bergensbanen	Vaksdal
Preceding station	Local trains	Following station
Trengereid	Bergen Commuter Rail	Vaksdal
