= Ulriksbanen =

Aerial tramway in Bergen, Norway

Coordinates: 60°22′26.40″N 5°21′49.59″E

Ulriksbanen

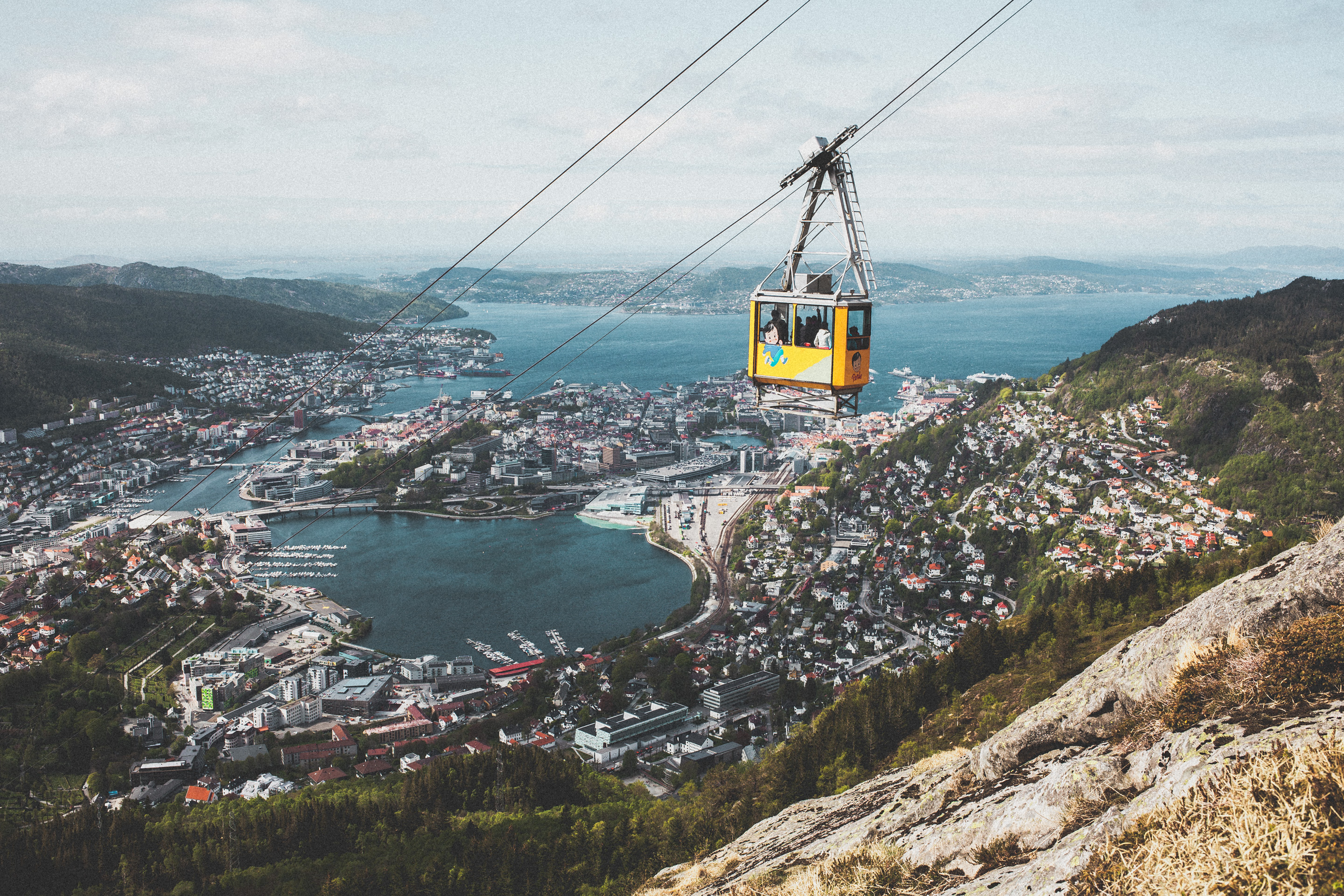
View of the old tramway

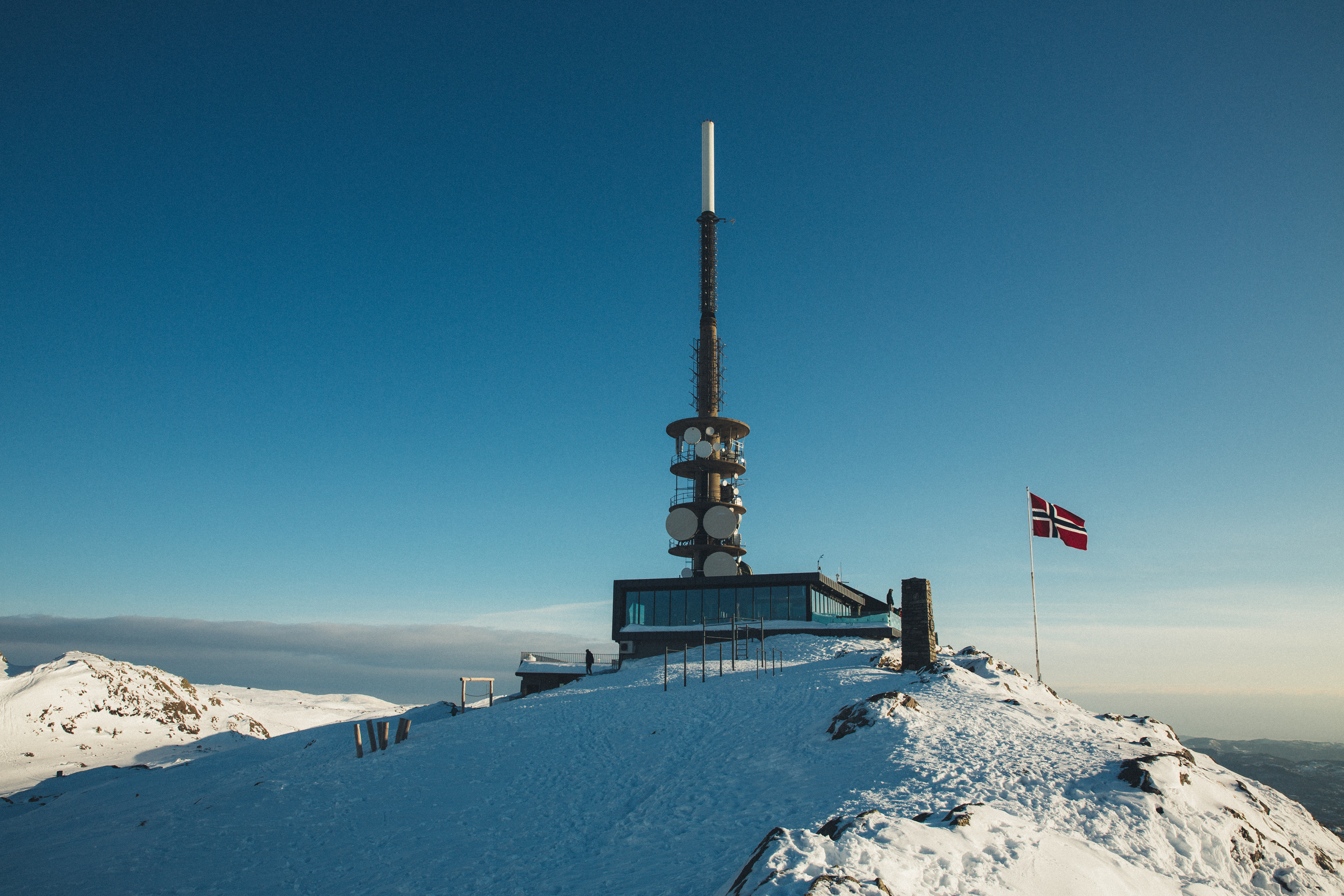
Ulriksbanen - at top station.

Ulriksbanen is a passenger aerial tramway in Bergen, Norway. It connects the mountain Ulriken to the city, and is frequently used by tourists as well as locals. The tramway was first thought of by Frithjof Meidell Andersen in 1954, and a company was established in 1959. After having been constructed by a Swiss company, Ulriksbanen opened in 1961. Ulriksbanen, branded as Ulriken643, in reference to the height of Mount Ulriken, opened with a new cable car (50 person capacity) and new bigger Skyskraperen restaurant in October 2021.

== Accidents ==
The first and only accident in the history of Ulriksbanen happened in 1974. During the first six months of the year, a record-breaking 91,000 had travelled with the tramway. On 9 July, one of the cable cars detached and fell to the ground, killing four. Following the accident, the tramway was closed for five years. The local department of the Norwegian Mountain Touring Association took over the operation in 1983, but was forced to close in 1988 and 1989 due to a lack of funds.

On 10 January 2006, Ulriksbanen was shut down when one of the track cables derailed. On 4 March 2006, it was reopened, continuing to operate until August the same year when the police was forced to close the tramway after a safety inspection. Ulriksbanen was reopened on 1 April 2007. In January 2008, the tramway was again shut down due to fears that the cables could be too damaged for Ulriksbanen to operate safely. Ulriksbanen was reopened to the public again on the 1 May 2009.
