= Ulriken =

Highest mountain in Bergen, Norway

- Ålreken
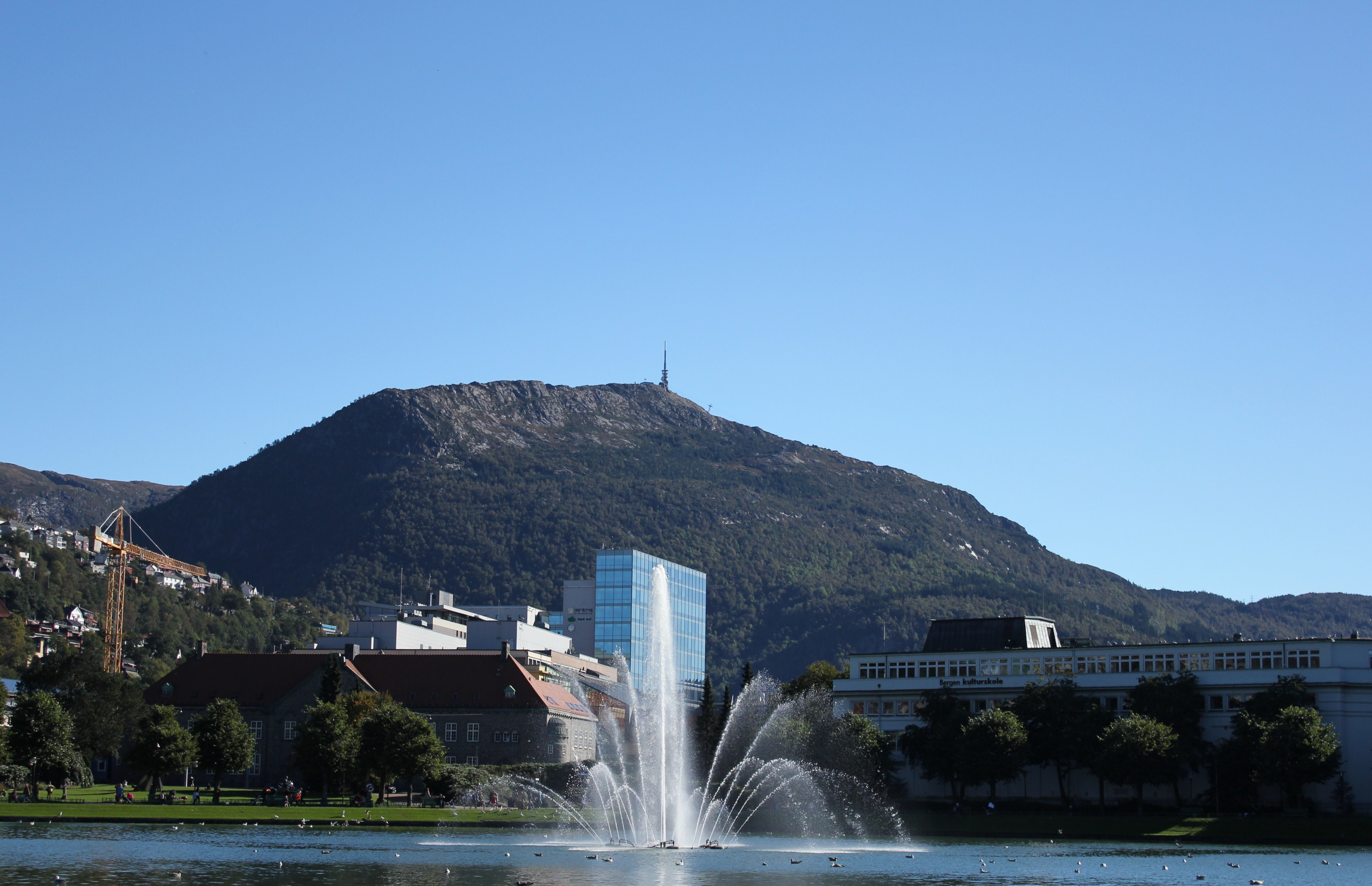
- Ulriken, as seen from the centre of Bergen

Highest point
- Elevation: 643 m (2,110 ft)
- Prominence: 40 m (130 ft)
- Parent peak: Hauggjelsvarden
- Isolation: 1.4 km (0.87 mi)
- Coordinates: 60°22′39″N 5°23′14″E

Geography
- Location: Vestland, Norway
- Topo map: 1115 I Bergen

Climbing
- Easiest route: Aerial tramway

Ulriken (or the older, Ålreken) is a mountain in Bergen Municipality in Vestland county, Norway. It is the highest of the Seven Mountains (Norwegian: De syv fjell) that surround the city centre of Bergen. It has a height of 643 metres (2,110 ft) above sea level. Ulriken has an aerial tramway, Ulriksbanen, that can bring people to the top. At the top there is a TV tower and a restaurant. There is a network of trails along Ulriken, which is a popular hike with several paths up ranging from steep to not so steep.

== History ==
One of the slopes of Ulriken, known as Isdalen ("Ice Valley"), is also nicknamed "Death Valley", due to the area's history of suicides in the Middle Ages, and more recent hiking accidents. The valley became well known in 1970 when the remains of the mysterious Isdal Woman was discovered there. Another area of the mountain is called "Montana."

Ulriksbanen opened in 1961 and was closed in 1974 after an accident. The cable car closed again in the 1980s due to lack of funds, and again in January 2006, due to the operating company failing to meet government requirements for documentation, but it reopened later in the spring of the same year. It was later closed again, but it reopened for business on May 1, 2009.

The Ulriken Tunnel (Norwegian: Ulrikstunnelen) is a single-line railway tunnel on the Bergen Line between Bergen Station and Arna Station. Opened in 1964, the 7.6-kilometre (4.7 mi) long tunnel runs under the northern part of Ulriken. A second tunnel, begun in January 2016, was completed in December 2020.

The mountain was featured in a 2016 music video by Alan Walker called Alone.

== Gallery ==
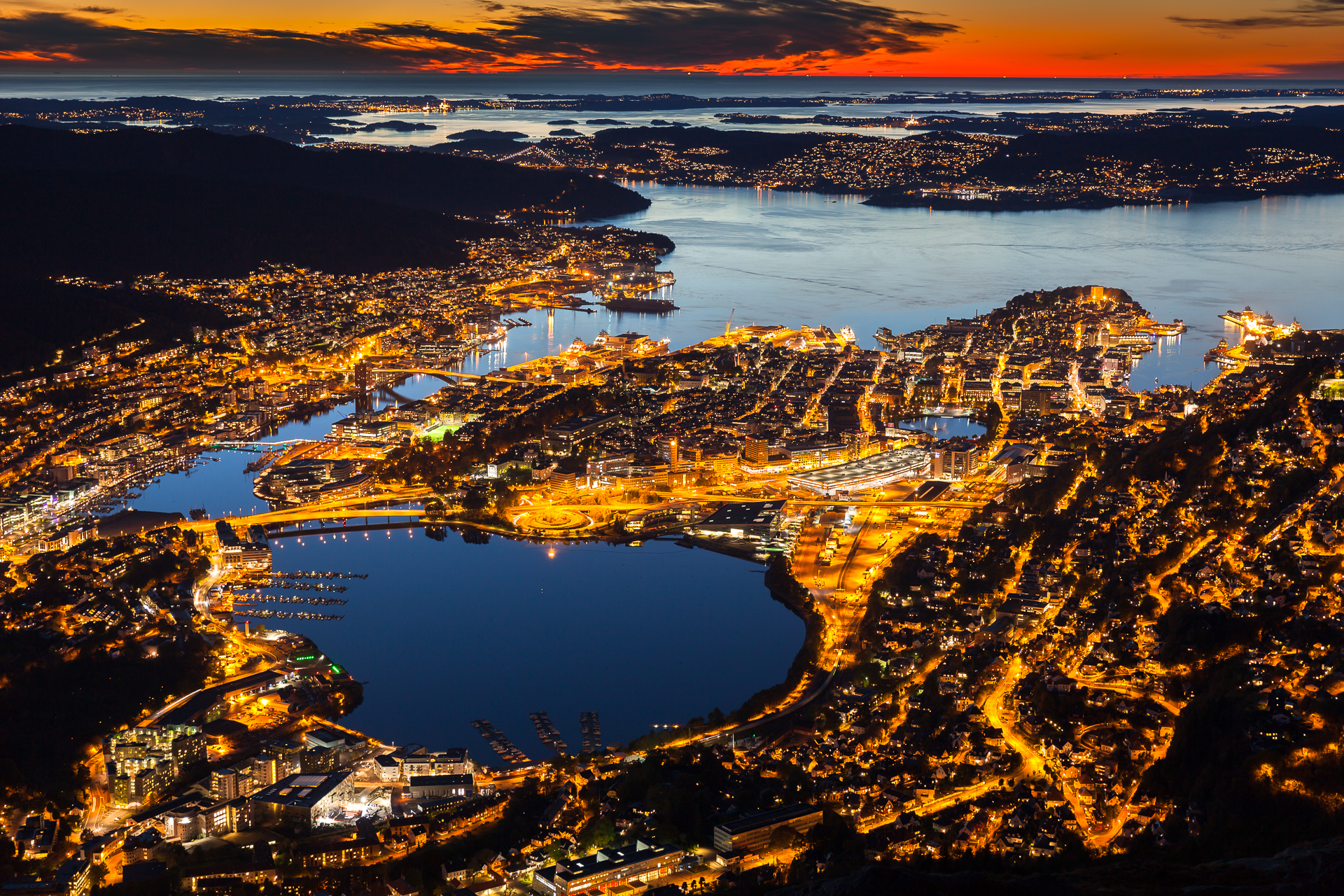
View of Bergen from Ulriken

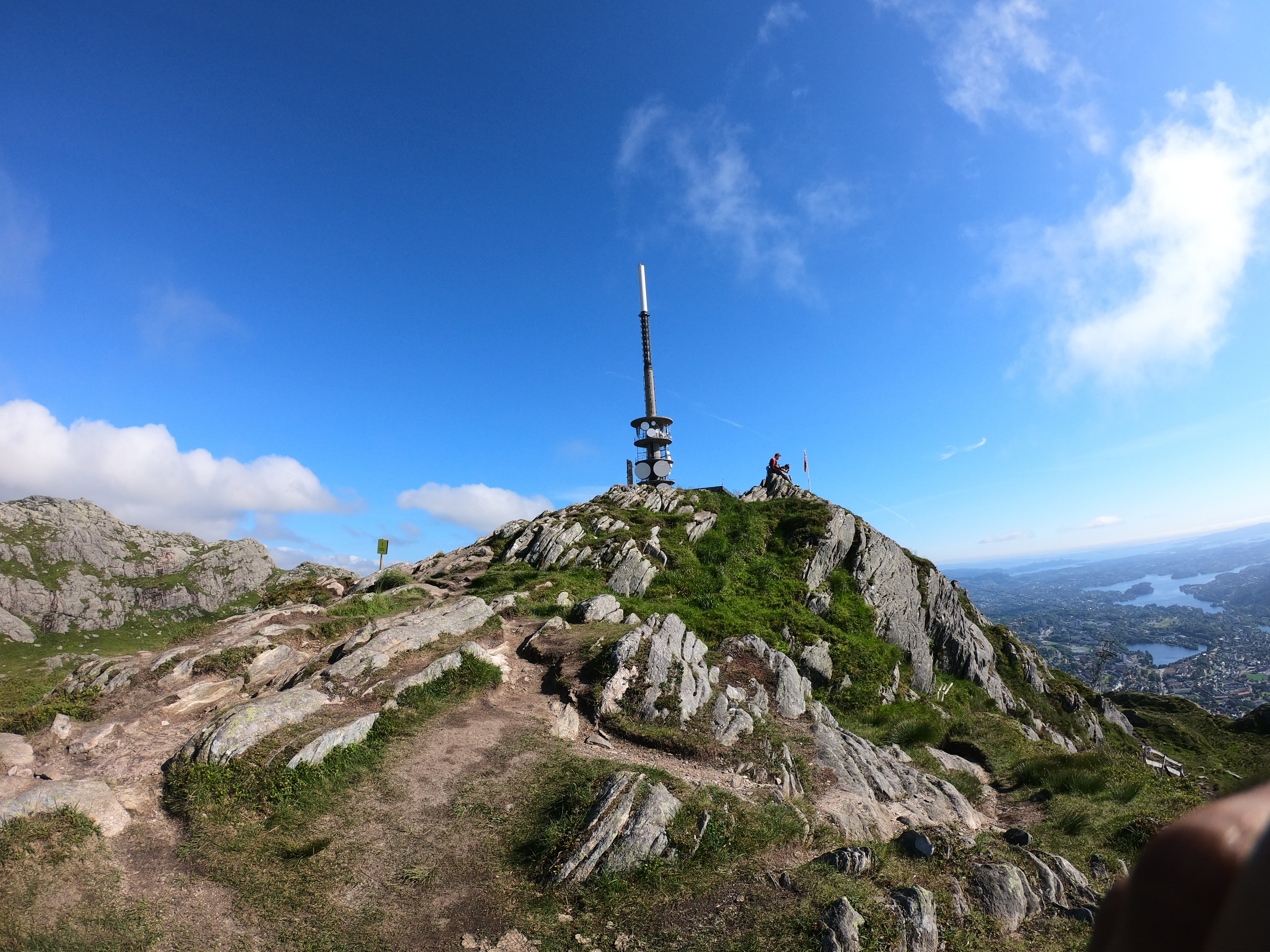

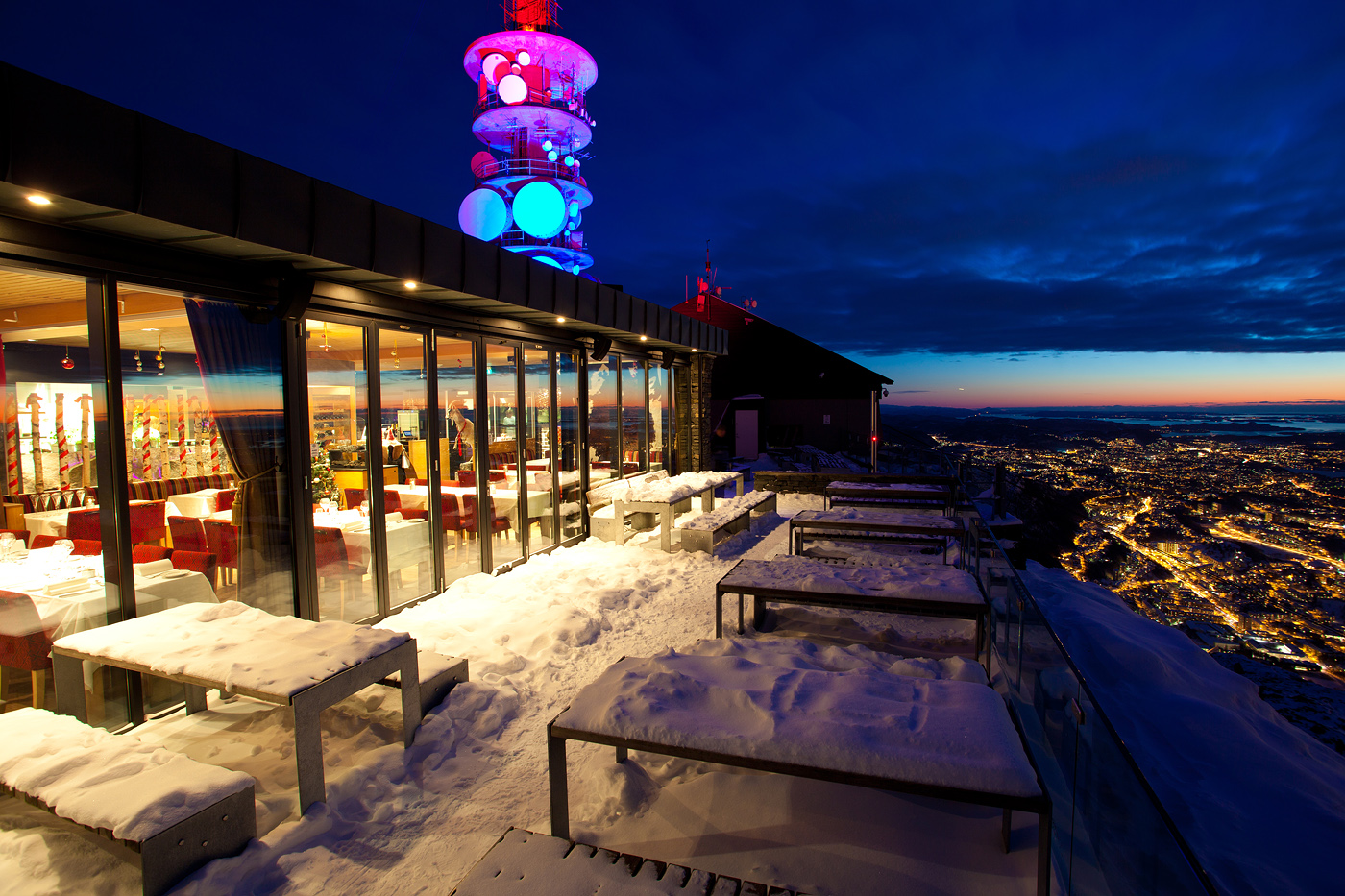
Restaurant at Ulriken

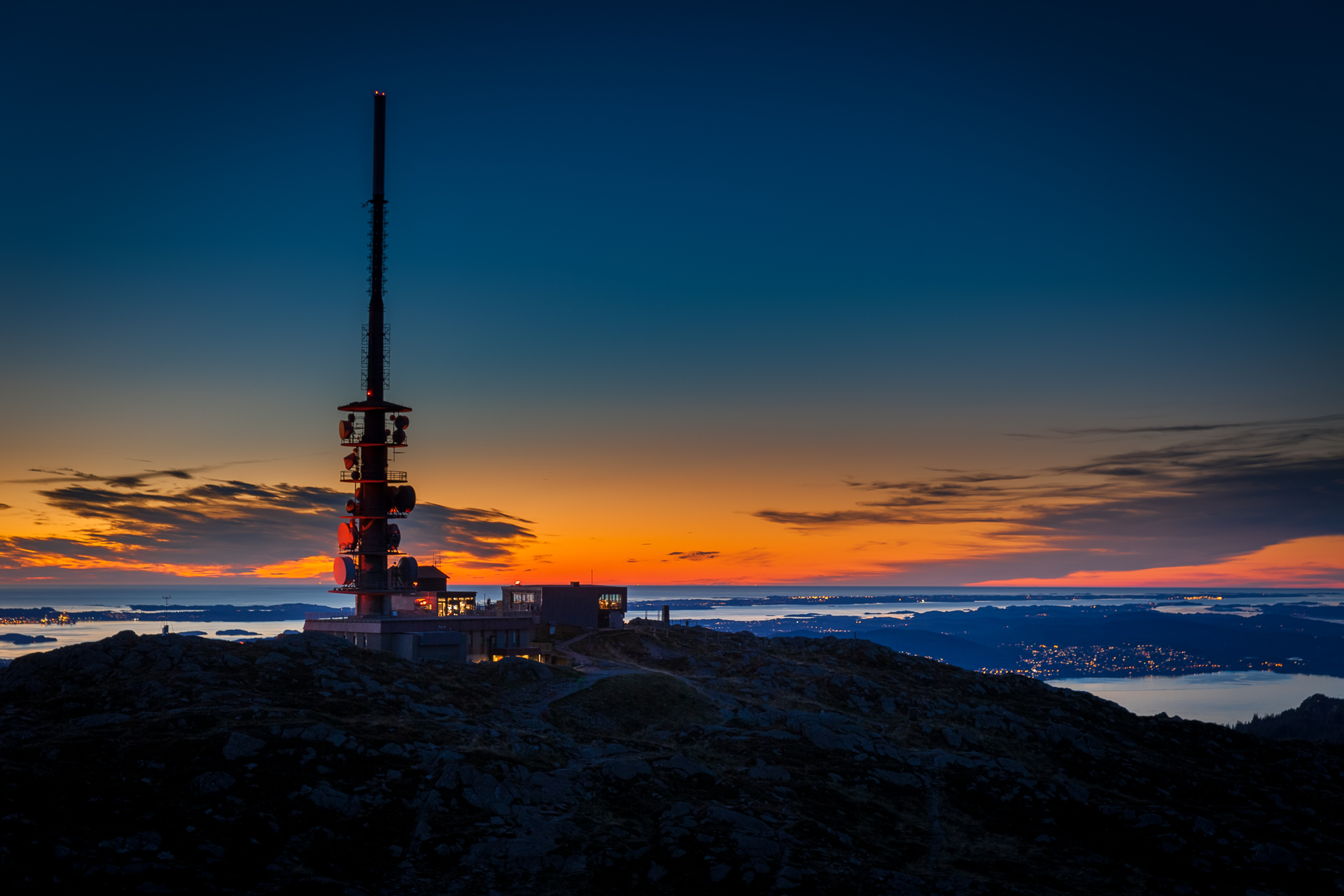
Ulriken TV Tower at night

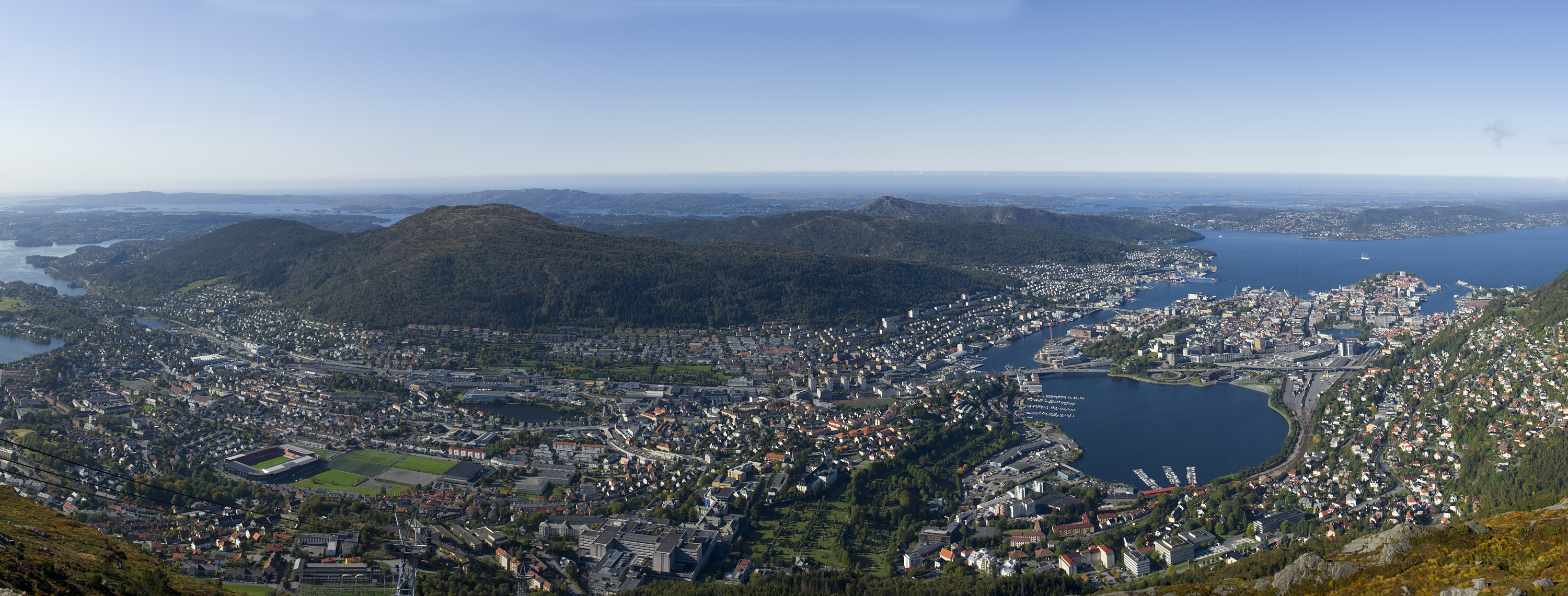
View of Bergen in September 2008

== See also ==
- List of mountains of Norway
