= Stanghelle =

Village in Vaksdal Municipality, Norway

- Village
- Interactive map of Stanghelle
- Coordinates: 60.55224°N 5.73632°E
- Country: Norway
- Region: Western Norway
- County: Vestland
- District: Nordhordland
- Municipality: Vaksdal Municipality

Area
  - Total: 0.41 km^{2} (0.16 sq mi)
- Elevation: 2 m (6.6 ft)

Population (2025)
  - Total: 801
  - Density: 1,954/km^{2} (5,060/sq mi)
- Time zone: UTC+01:00 (CET)
  - Summer (DST): UTC+02:00 (CEST)
- Post Code: 5724 Stanghelle

Stanghelle is a village in Vaksdal Municipality in Vestland county, Norway. The village lies along the Veafjorden at the mouth of the Hellestraumen (a small branch off the main fjord).

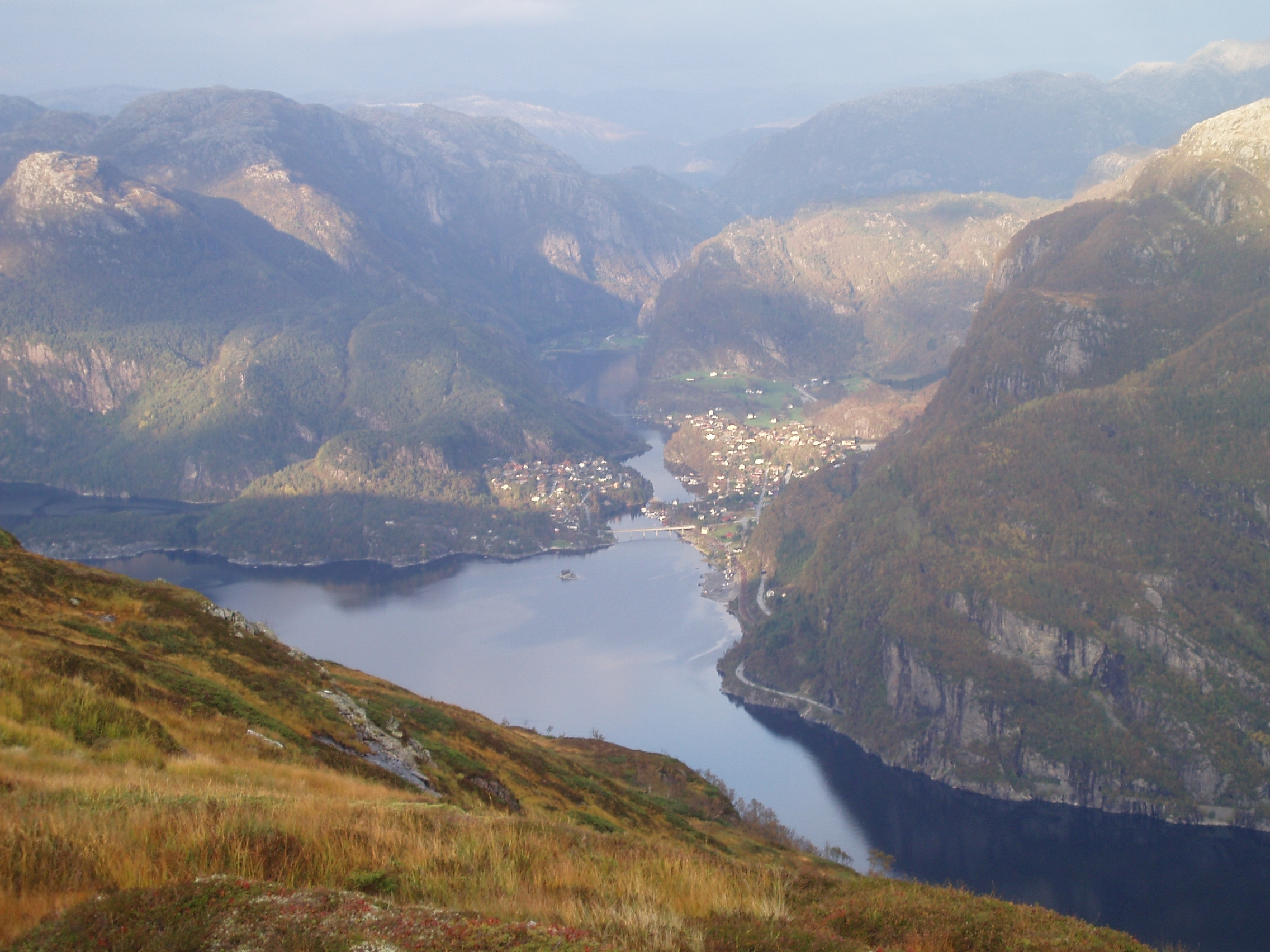
View of Stanghelle, looking northeast

The 0.41-square-kilometre (100-acre) village has a population (2025) of 801 and a population density of 1,954 inhabitants per square kilometre (5,060/sq mi).

The European route E16 runs through the village, and the Bergen Line stops at Stanghelle Station. The village of Helle lies immediately northeast of Stanghelle, and the municipal centre of Dale lies about 5 kilometres (3.1 mi) northeast of Stanghelle.
