= Arna station =

Railway station in Arna, Norway

Arna Station
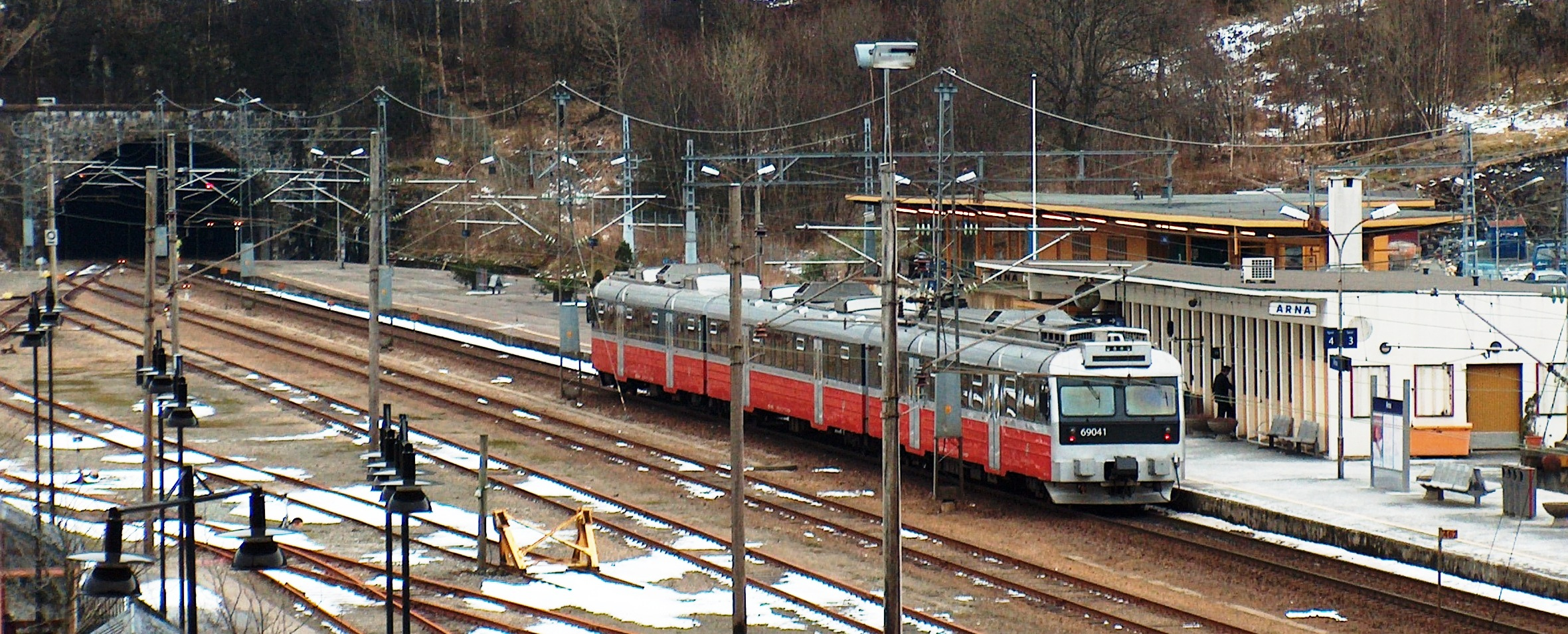

General information
- Location: Arna, Bergen Municipality; Norway
- Coordinates: 60°25′13.36″N 5°27′59.14″E
- Elevation: 8.0 m (26.2 ft) asl
- Owner: Bane NOR
- Operator: Vy Tog
- Line: Bergen Line
- Distance: 461.93 km (287.03 mi)
- Platforms: 3

History
- Opened: 1964
Location

Arna Station (Norwegian: Arna stasjon) is a train station in the village of Indre Arna in Bergen Municipality in Vestland county, Norway. The station is located in the borough of Arna, just east of the centre of the city of Bergen. The station is on the east side of Ulriken and between the Ulriken Tunnel and Ådnanipa Tunnel. The present station was opened in 1964, when the tunnels were completed. The old station, located north of the new station, is still in use for heritage trains on Gamle Vossebanen.

All passenger trains on the Bergen Line stop at Arna. The most frequent trains are shuttle trains which run between the Bergen Railway Station and Arna, providing the fastest connection between downtown Bergen and Indre Arna. These normally operate each half-hour, or hourly in weekends and evenings.

== Accident in 2024 ==
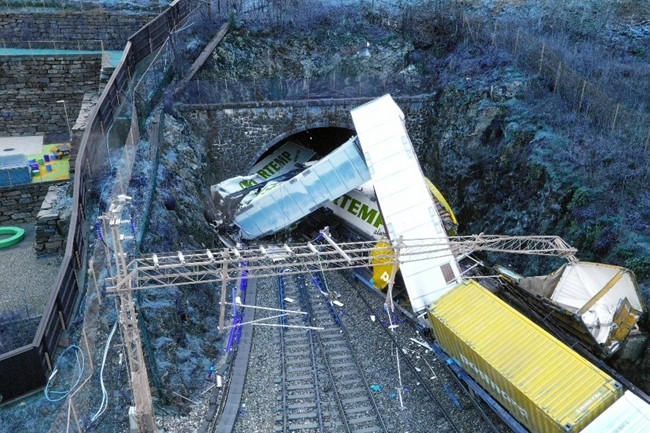
Accident in March 2024

On March 22, 2024, at around 19:00 local time, a freight train heading east derailed close to the Ådnanipa Tunnel entrance near Arna station. The locomotive ended up inside the tunnel, while several of the 25 goods rail cars crumpled together with an "accordion effect" around the tunnel opening.

Inside the tunnel, a westbound passenger train from Vy carrying 200 passengers, stopped approximately 1 kilometre (0.62 mi) from the accident. A work train from Bane NOR pulled the passenger train out of the tunnel and back to Stanghelle Station.

Preceding station			Following station
Bergen	Bergen Line		Trengereid
Preceding station	Express trains		Following station
Bergen	F4	Bergen–Oslo S	Vaksdal
Preceding station	Local trains		Following station
Bergen		Vossebanen	Trengereid
