= Helle, Vaksdal =

Village in Vaksdal Municipality, Norway

Helle
- Village
- Interactive map of Helle
- Coordinates: 60.5636°N 5.7537°E
- Country: Norway
- Region: Western Norway
- County: Vestland
- District: Nordhordland
- Municipality: Vaksdal Municipality
- Elevation: 12 m (39 ft)
- Time zone: UTC+01:00 (CET)
  - Summer (DST): UTC+02:00 (CEST)
- Post Code: 5722 Dalekvam

Helle is a small village in Vaksdal Municipality in Vestland county, Norway. Located just northeast of the village of Stanghelle, Helle is included in the urban area of Stanghelle which has a population of 801 (in 2025). The European route E16 highway runs through the village.
