= Stanghelle Station =

Railway station in Vaksdal, Norway

Stanghelle
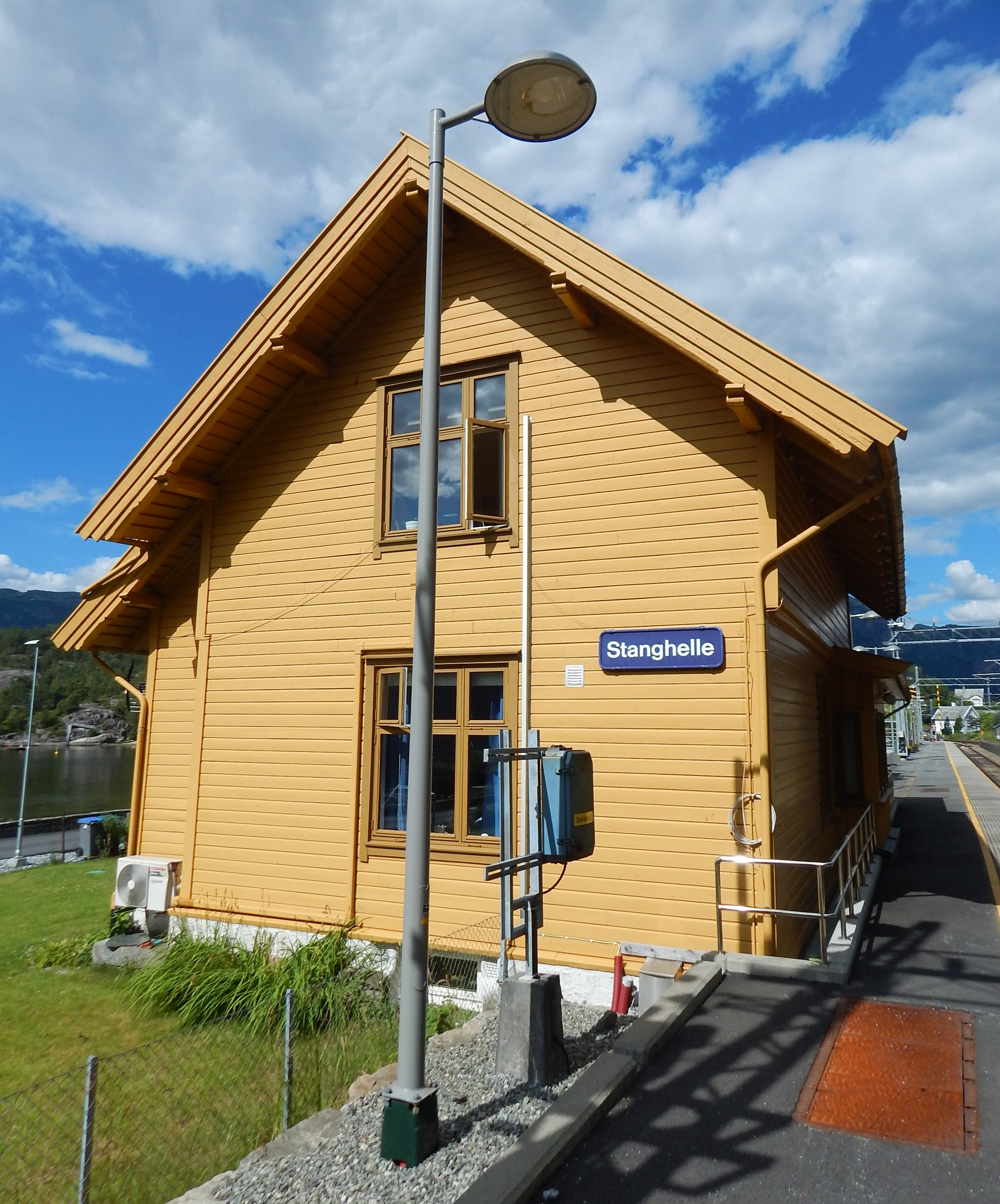
- Stanghelle Station

General information
- Location: Stanghelle, Vaksdal Municipality; Norway
- Coordinates: 60.548756°N 5.733052°E
- Elevation: 2.5 m (8 ft 2 in)
- Owner: Bane NOR
- Operator: Vy Tog
- Line: Bergen Line
- Distance: 432.22 km
- Platforms: 2

History
- Opened: 1883
Location

Stanghelle Station (Norwegian: Stanghelle stasjon) is a railway station located at the village of Stanghelle in Vaksdal Municipality in Vestland county, Norway. The station is served by twelve daily departures per direction by the Bergen Commuter Rail operated by Vy Tog. The station opened in 1883 as part of Vossebanen.

Preceding station		Following station
Vaksdal	Bergen Line	Dale
Preceding station	Local trains	Following station
Vaksdal	Bergen Commuter Rail	Dale
