= Bergensposten =

Norwegian newspaper (1854–1893)

Bergensposten (Wednesday, March 1, 1854)

Bergensposten is a defunct newspaper published in Bergen, Norway from 1 March 1854 until 1893 when it merged with Bergens Tidende. The editor at the start was Johannes Steen who later became prime minister of Norway.
