= Bergen station =

Railway station in Bergen, Norway

Bergen Station
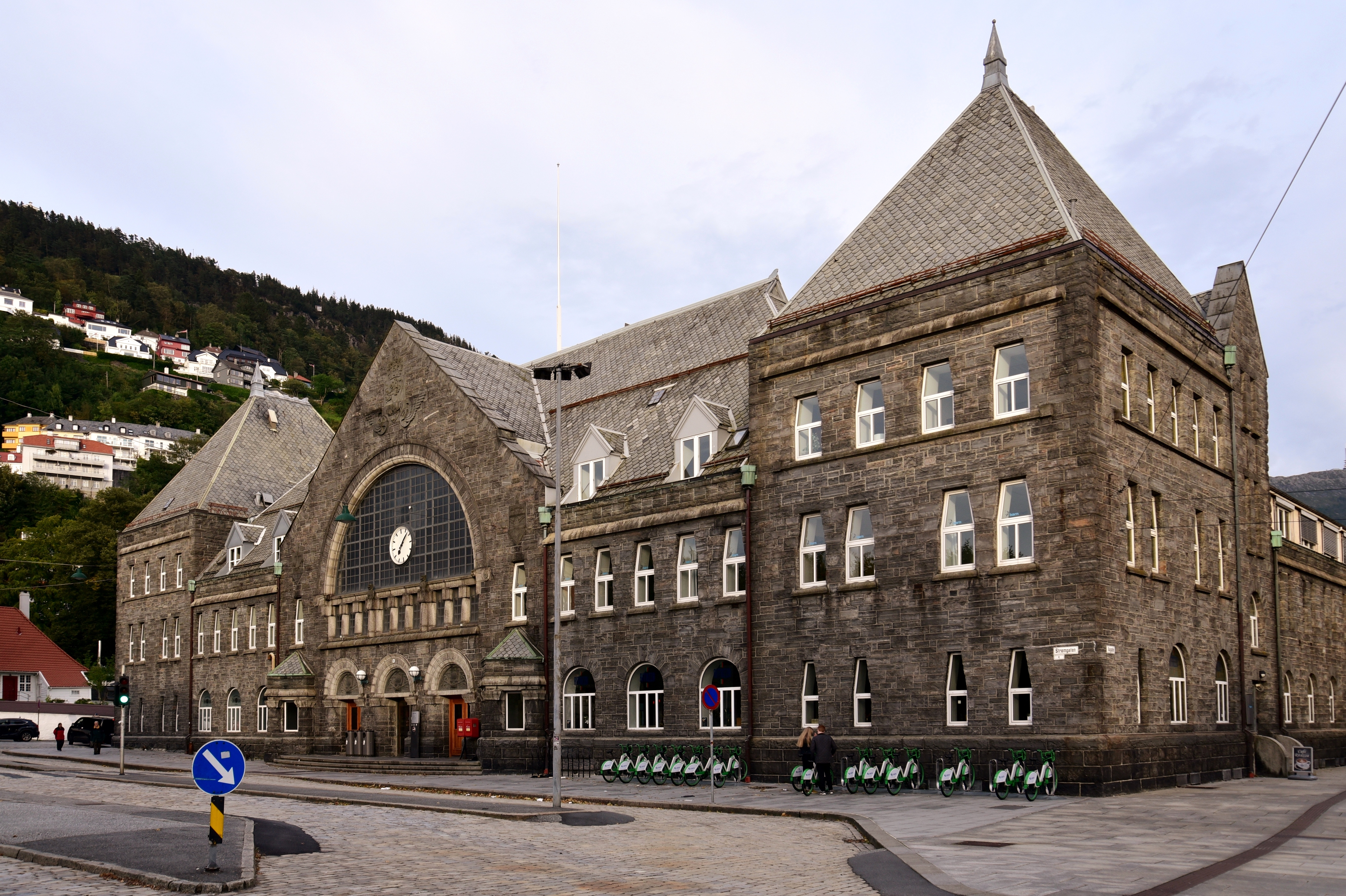
- Front facade of Bergen station, 2019

General information
- Location: Bergen; Norway
- Coordinates: 60°23′25″N 5°19′59″E
- Owner: Bane NOR
- Operator: Vy Tog
- Line: Bergen Line
- Platforms: 4
- Connections: Bus; Bergen Light Rail

Construction
- Architect: Jens Zetlitz Monrad Kielland
- Architectural style: National Romantic style

Other information
- Station code: BRG

History
- Opened: 1913
Location

Bergen Station (Norwegian: Bergen stasjon) is the main railway station in the city of Bergen, Norway. It is a terminal station on the Bergen Line, and serves trains from Oslo as well as the Bergen Commuter Rail from Indre Arna, Vossevangen and Myrdal. It is located on the east side of the city centre and has four platforms. The station was opened in 1913, four years after the Bergen Line itself opened; it replaced a former building that was located a little further to the west of the present station.

== Architecture ==
The station building is one of the grandest in Norway. The architect, Jens Zetlitz Monrad Kielland, designed it in the National Romantic style. He also designed Gamlehaugen, and the stone buildings at Bryggen. The building has been protected against non-trivial modifications since 2003.

== History ==
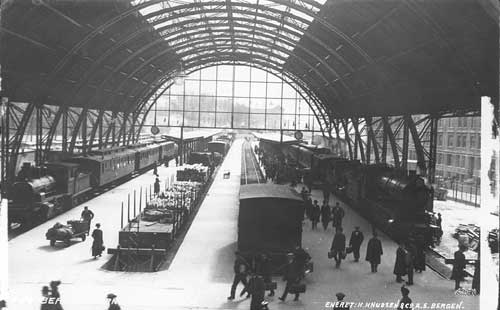
The interior of the station just after the opening in 1913

Having been established in 1921, Norsk Spisevognselskap attempted to find a suitable location for a restaurant in Bergen. There was at the time a small restaurant in the station building, but there was not sufficient space for storage of food. Because of high real estate prices in the area, Norsk Spisevognselskap instead established a kiosk at the station on 1 May 1922.

The same year, 1922, the company contemplated establishing a hotel near the railway station. The plan materialised in the construction of Hotel Terminus, which was owned in part by NSB, in part by Spisevognselskapet and in part by other parties.

On 2 April 1937, Spisevognselskapet established a restaurant in the station.

== Gallery ==
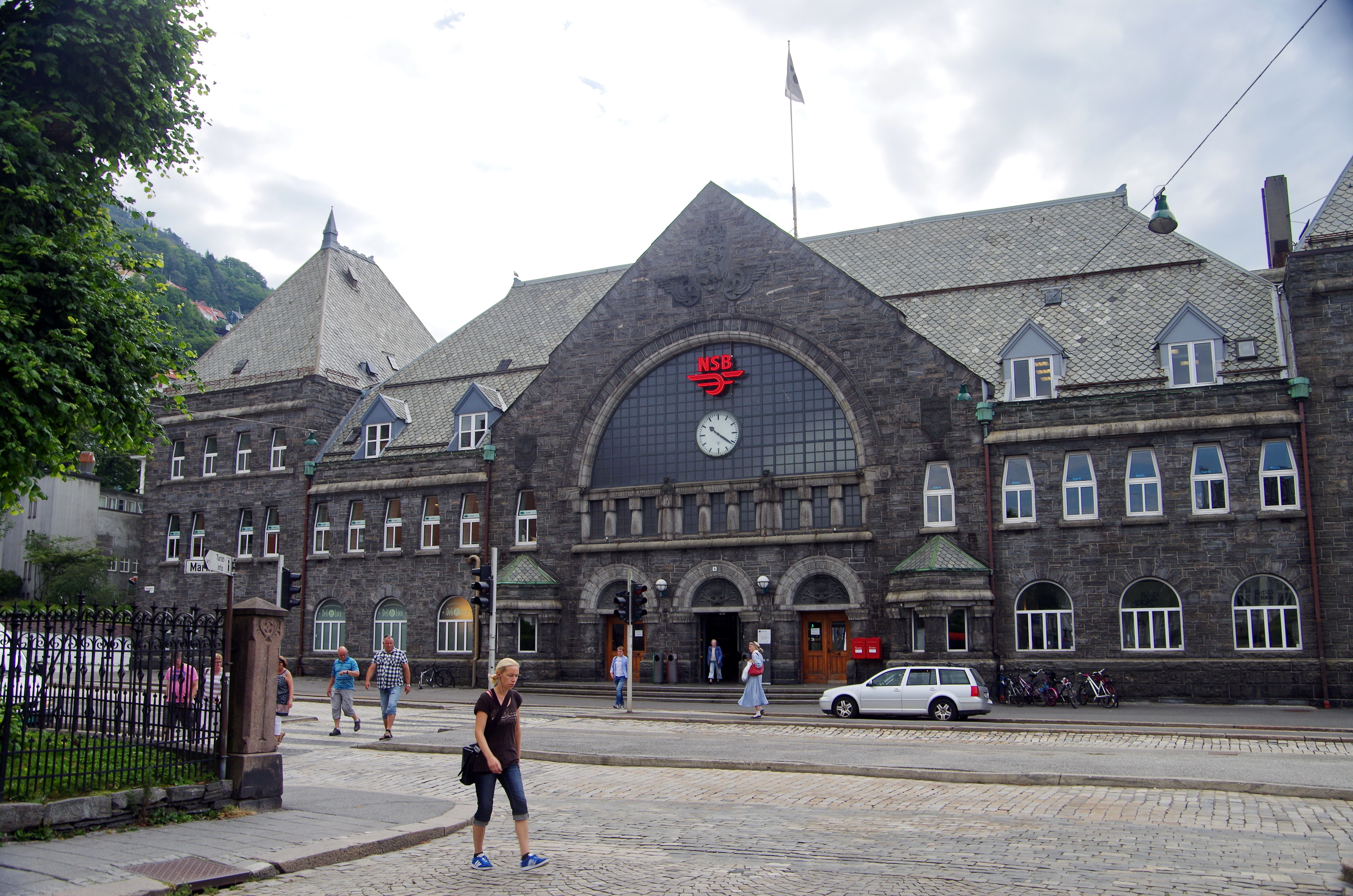
Bergen station

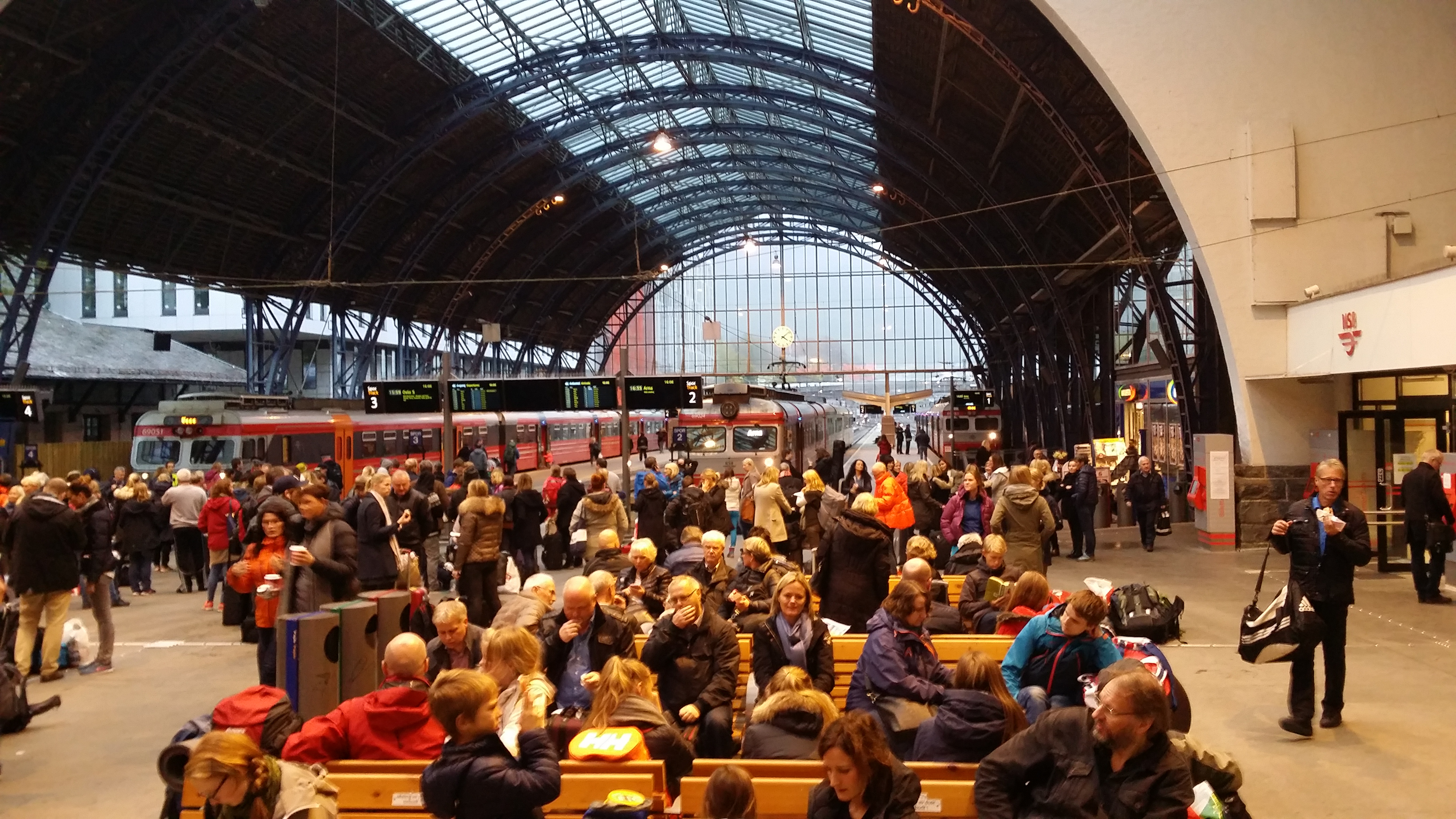

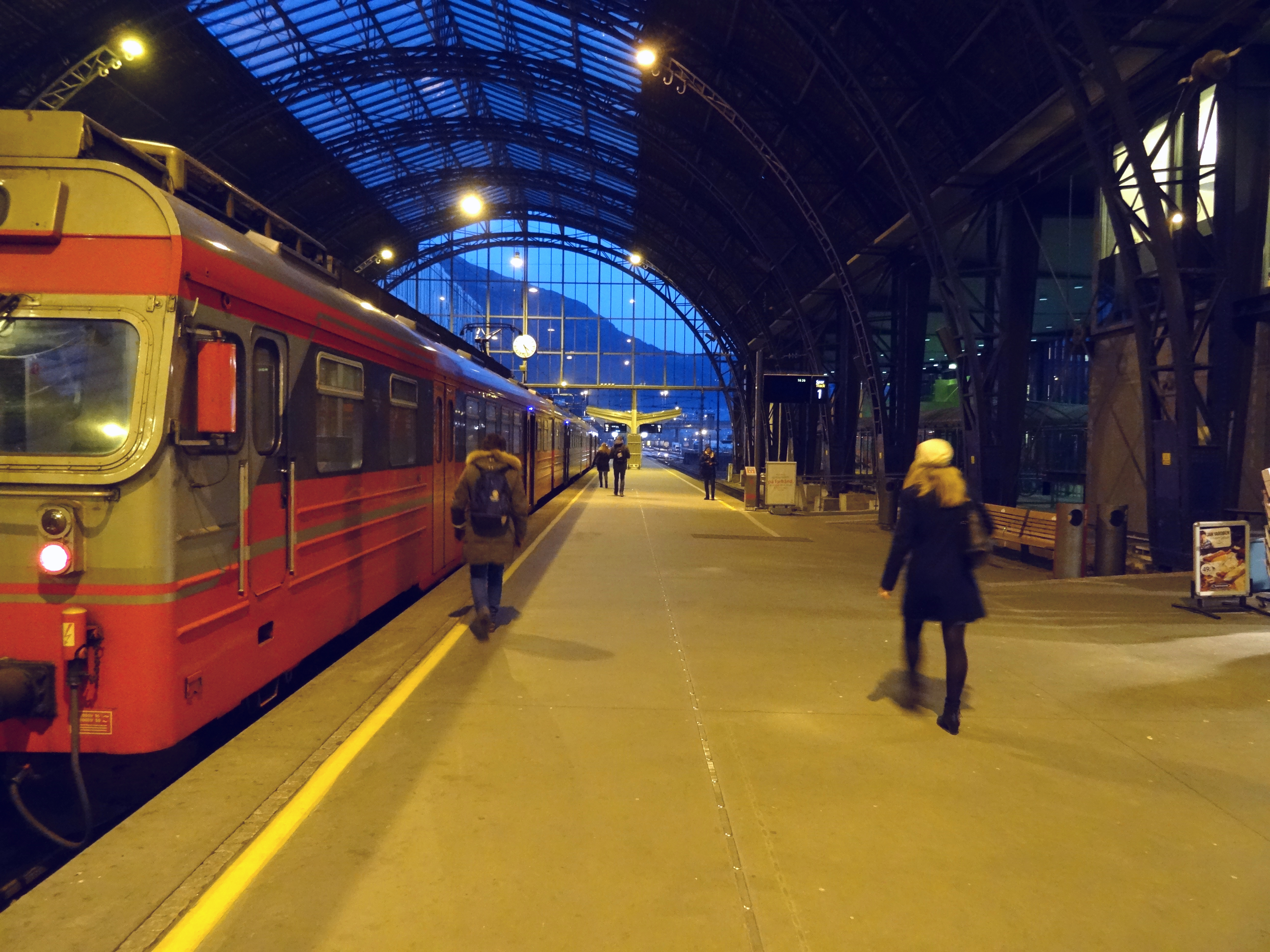

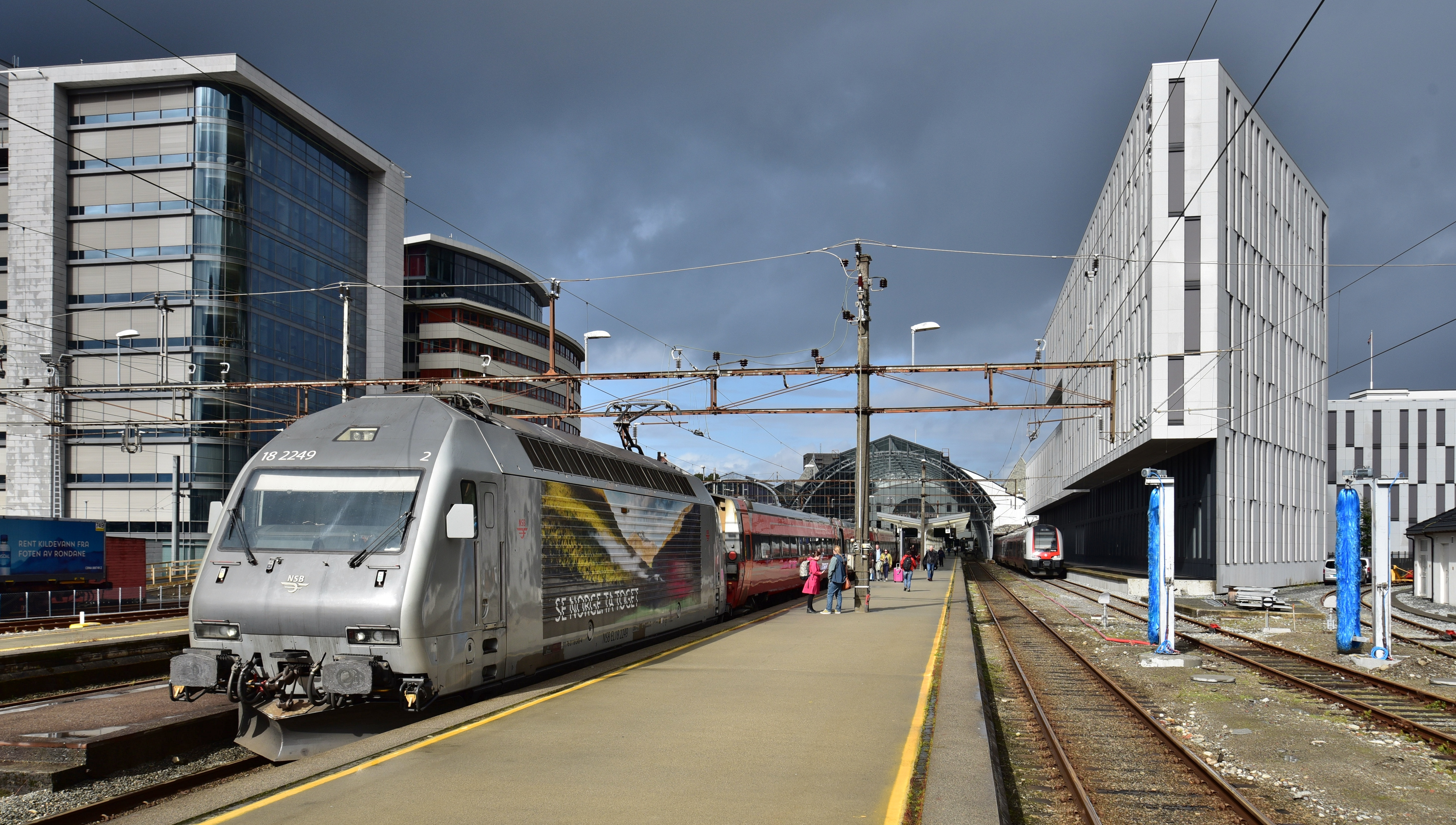
NSB El 18 class electric locomotive no 2249 awaits departure from Bergen station with an Oslo S-bound express train

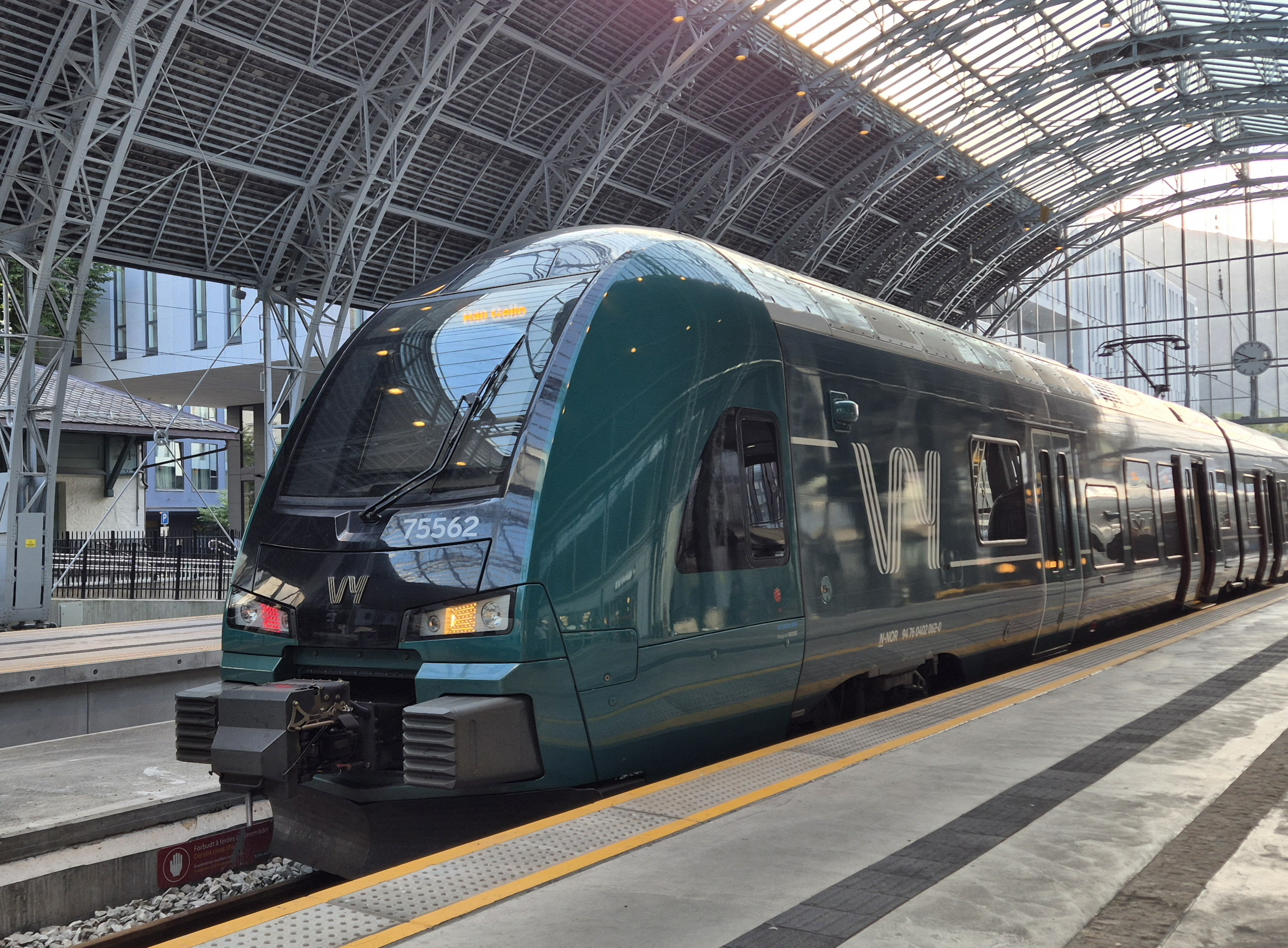
Regional trains often depart from Bergen. In this case, a class 75 train used by Vy is pictured, going to Geilo.

Preceding station			Following station
terminus	Bergen Line		Arna
Preceding station	Express trains		Following station
terminus	F4	Bergen–Oslo S	Arna
Preceding station	Local trains		Following station
terminus		Bergen Commuter Rail	Arna
