= Odda Municipality =

Former municipality in Hordaland, Norway

Odda Municipality Odda kommune
- Former municipality
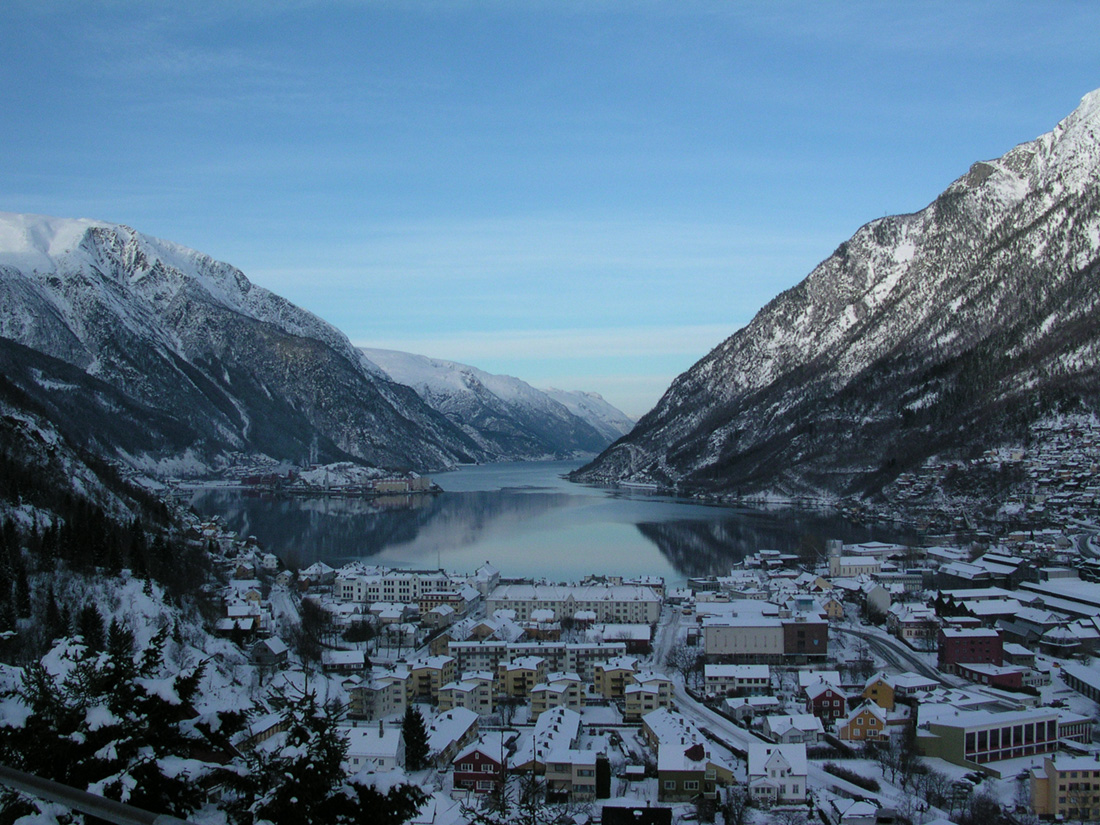
- View of the town of Odda

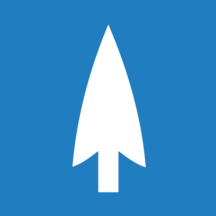
- Flag Coat of arms

- Hordaland within Norway

- Odda within Hordaland
- Coordinates: 60°04′00″N 06°32′46″E
- Country: Norway
- County: Hordaland
- District: Hardanger
- Established: 1 July 1913
  - Preceded by: Ullensvang Municipality
- Disestablished: 1 Jan 2020
  - Succeeded by: Ullensvang Municipality
- Administrative centre: Odda

Government
  - Mayor (2015–2019): Roald Aga Haug (Ap)

Area (upon dissolution)
  - Total: 1,615.89 km^{2} (623.90 sq mi)
  - Land: 1,475.43 km^{2} (569.67 sq mi)
  - Water: 140.46 km^{2} (54.23 sq mi) 8.7%
  - Rank: #42 in Norway
- Highest elevation: 1,721.2 m (5,647 ft)

Population (2019)
  - Total: 6,745
  - Rank: #157 in Norway
  - Density: 4.2/km^{2} (11/sq mi)
  - Change (10 years): ▼ −4.4%
- Demonym: Odding

Official language
  - Norwegian form: Neutral
- Time zone: UTC+01:00 (CET)
  - Summer (DST): UTC+02:00 (CEST)
- ISO 3166 code: NO-1228

Odda is a former municipality in the old Hordaland county, Norway. The 1,615.89-square-kilometre (623.90 sq mi) municipality existed from 1913 until its dissolution in 2020. The area is now part of Ullensvang Municipality in the traditional district of Hardanger in Vestland county. The administrative centre was the town of Odda, which was also the main commercial and economic centre of the entire Hardanger region. Other villages in the municipality included Botnen, Eitrheim, Håra, Røldal, Seljestad, Skare, and Tyssedal.

Prior to its dissolution in 2020, the 1,615.89-square-kilometre (623.90 sq mi) municipality was the 42nd largest by area out of the 422 municipalities in Norway. Odda Municipality was the 157th most populous municipality in Norway with a population of about 6,745. The municipality's population density was 4.2 inhabitants per square kilometre (11/sq mi) and its population had decreased by 4.4% over the previous 10-year period.

It was located in southeastern Hordaland county, surrounding the southern end of the Sørfjorden. In 1927, Erling Johnson, working at Odda Smelteverk, invented a process to produce three-component, NPK fertilizers. This process is now known as the Odda process.

== General information ==
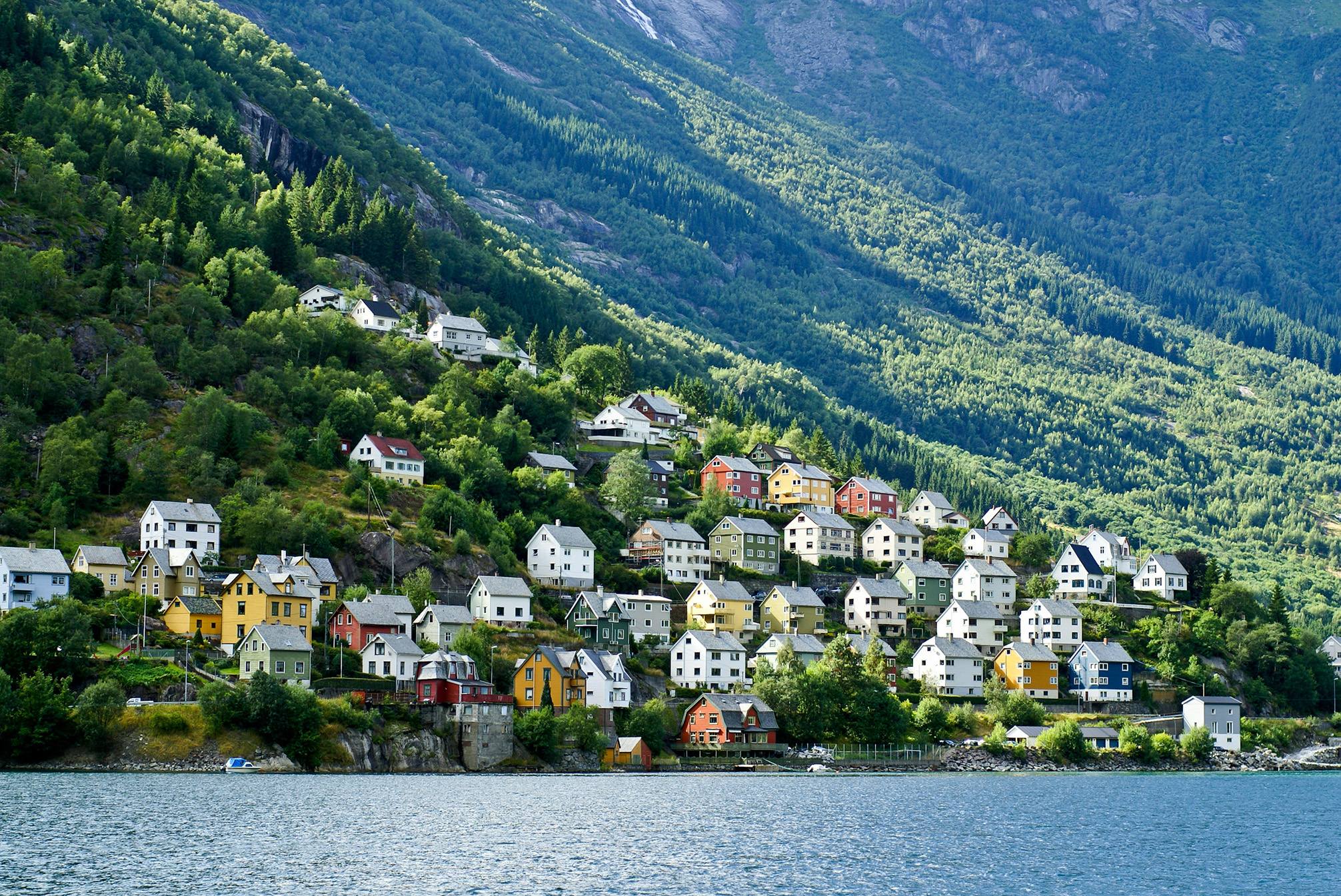
View of some houses in Odda

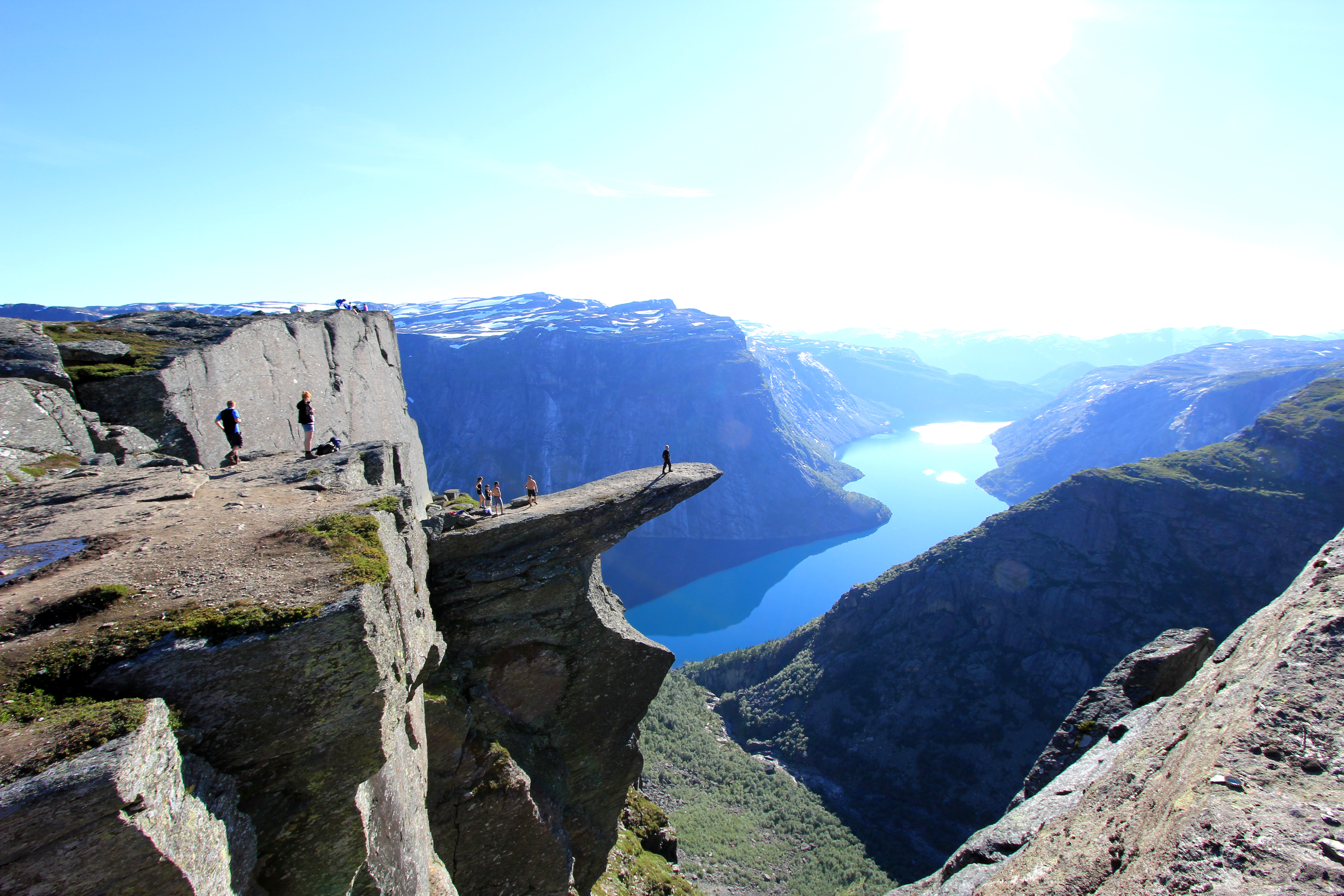
Trolltunga cliff

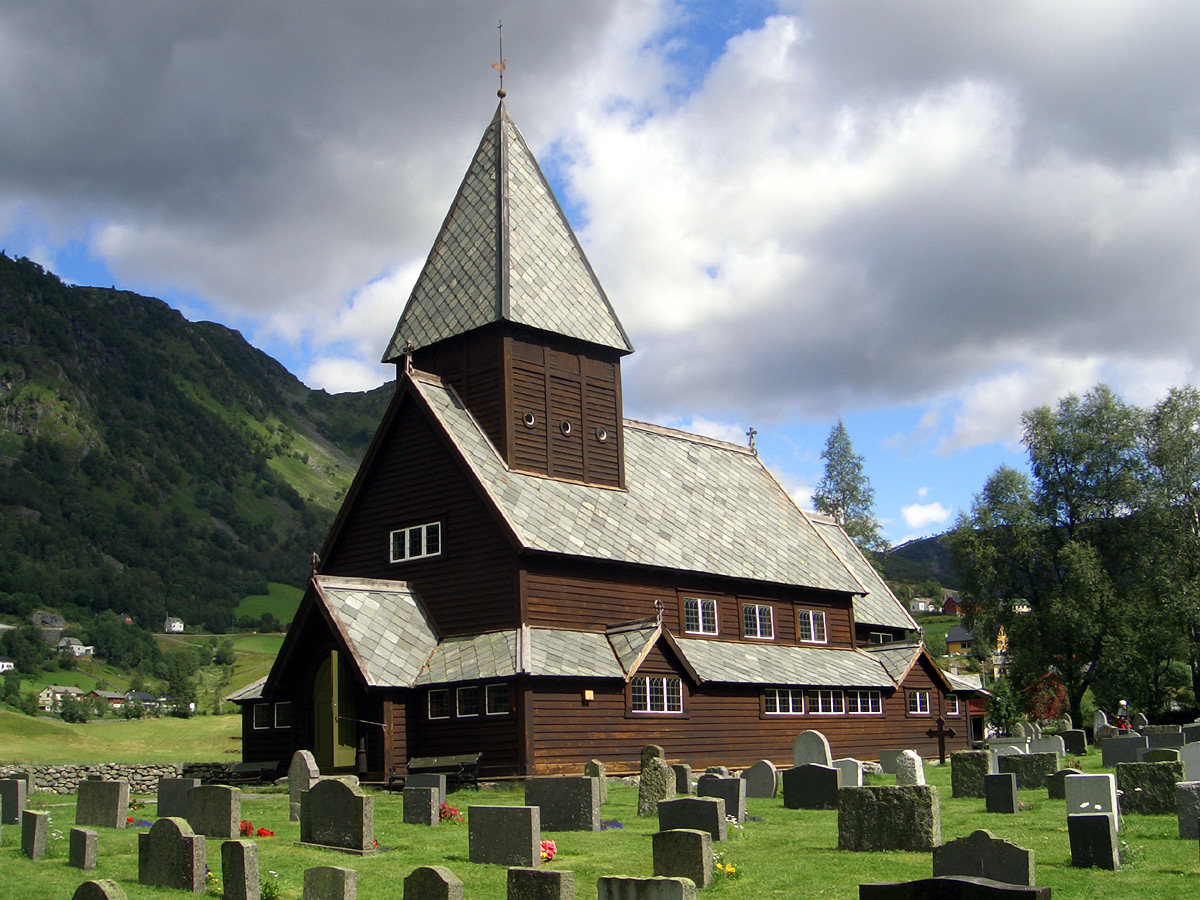
View of Røldal Stave Church

The municipality of Odda was established on 1 July 1913 when the large Ullensvang Municipality was divided as follows:

- the southern district (population: 3,077) became the new Odda Municipality
- the northern district (population: 1,736) became the new Kinsarvik Municipality
- the central district (population: 1,941) continued as a much smaller Ullensvang Municipality

During the 1960s, there were many municipal mergers across Norway due to the work of the Schei Committee. On 1 January 1964, the neighboring Røldal Municipality (population: 676) was merged into Odda Municipality, bringing the total population of the new, larger Odda Municipality to 10,163 residents.

On 1 January 2020, Jondal Municipality, Odda Municipality, and Ullensvang Municipality were merged. The new municipality is called Ullensvang Municipality and its administrative centre is the town of Odda. Historically, the old Odda Municipality was part of the old Hordaland county. On 1 January 2020, the newly-enlarged Ullensvang Municipality became a part of the newly-formed Vestland county (after Hordaland and Sogn og Fjordane counties were merged).

=== Name ===
The municipality (originally the parish) is named after the old Odda farm (Old Norse: Oddi) since the first Odda Church was built there. The name is identical with the word oddi which means "headland".

=== Coat of arms ===
The coat of arms was granted on 8 October 1982 and it was in use until 1 January 2020 when the municipality was dissolved. The official blazon is "Azure, an arrowhead argent" (Norwegian: På blå grunn ein opprett sølv pilodd). This means the arms have a blue field (background) and the charge is an arrowhead (Norwegian: pilodd) that is pointing upwards. The arrowhead has a tincture of argent which means it is commonly colored white, but if it is made out of metal, then silver is used. The arms are somewhat canting arms since the name of the municipality means headland or point. However, the arrowhead was also chosen because it symbolises power and movement. This is seen as reflecting the strength of will of the community and also the production of hydroelectric power and the important industries based on it. The colors are interpreted as representing the white of the Folgefonna glacier and the snowcapped mountains surrounding Odda and the blue of the fjord cutting deep into the landscape to reach the municipality. The arms were designed by Hallvard Trætteberg. The municipal flag has the same design as the coat of arms.

=== Churches ===
The Church of Norway had four parishes (sokn) within Odda Municipality. It is part of the Hardanger og Voss prosti (deanery) in the Diocese of Bjørgvin.

Churches in Odda Municipality
Parish (sokn)	Church name	Location of the church	Year built
Odda	Odda Church	Odda	1870
Røldal	Røldal Stave Church	Røldal	c. 1250
Skare	Skare Church	Skare	1926
Tyssedal	Tyssedal Church	Tyssedal	1965

== History ==
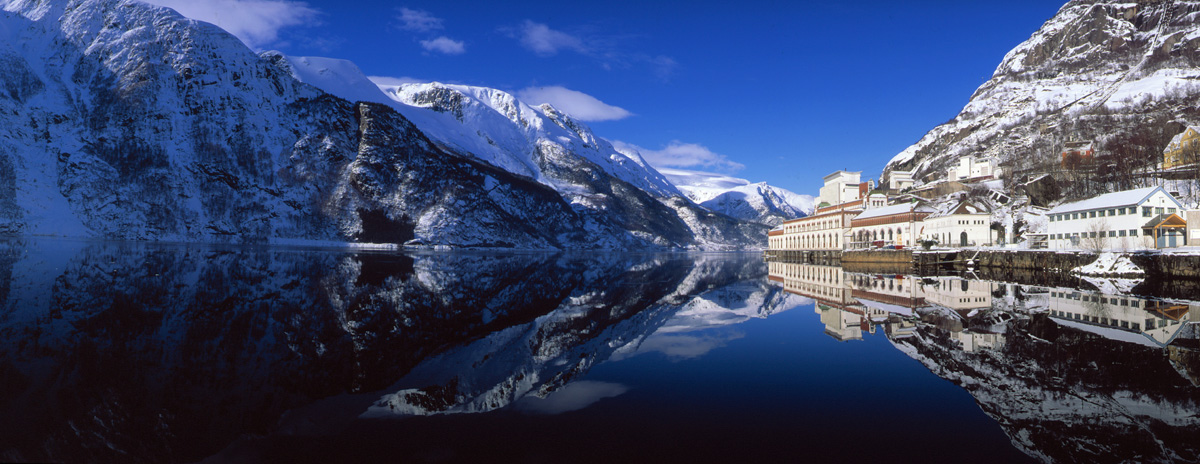
Tysso I power station

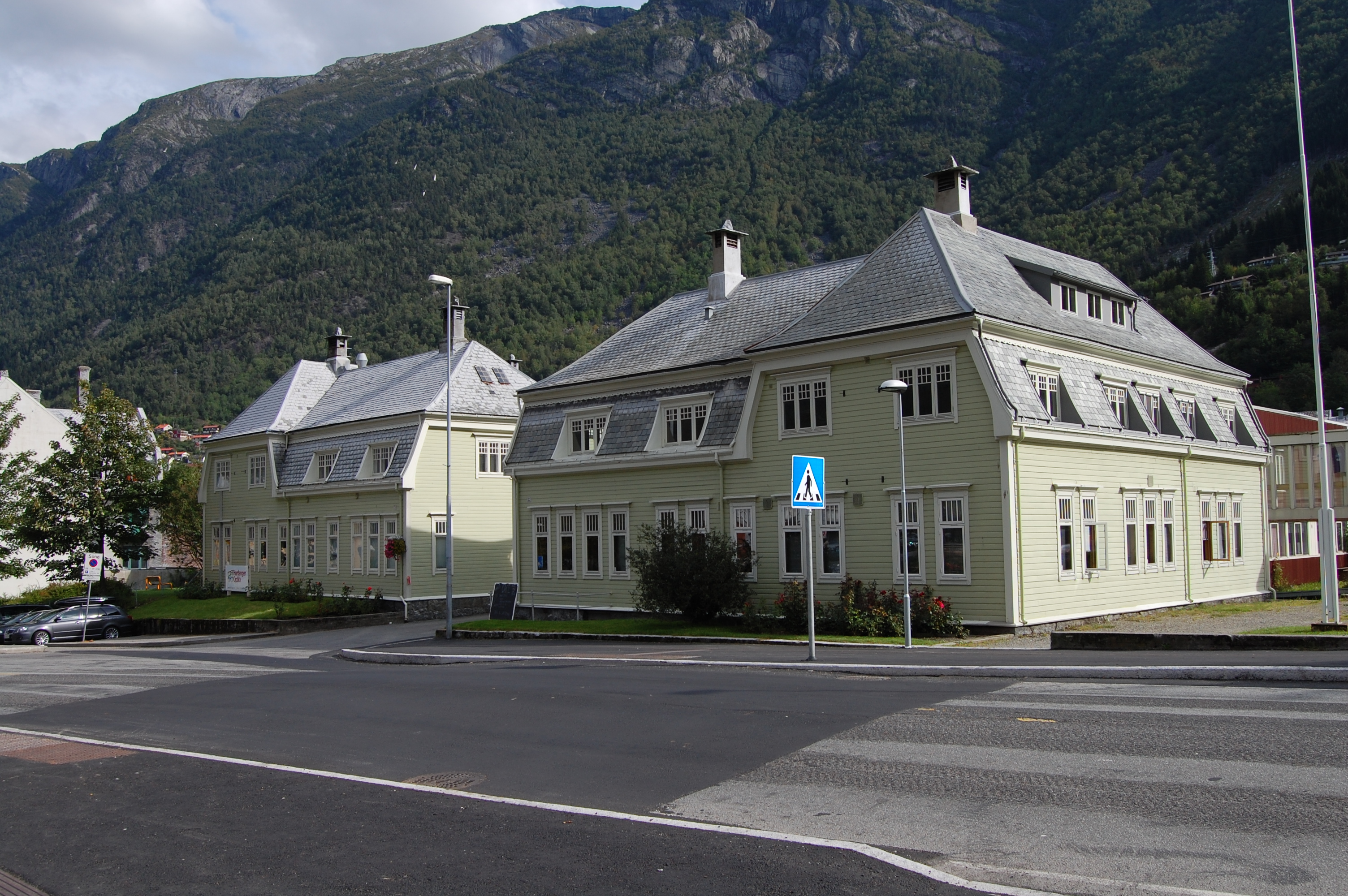
Offices of Odda Smelteverk, former North Western Cyanamide Company and Alby United Carbide Factory, 1906.

The Røldal Stave Church was built in the years 1200–1250 in the present-day village of Røldal. This was one of the oldest structures in the municipality.

During the 19th century, Odda became a significant tourist destination. Visits ranged from English pioneers around 1830 to the German Emperor Kaiser Wilhelm II, who visited Odda every year between 1891 and 1914. This led to the construction of several hotels in the municipality.

Odda Municipality was centred on the modern town of Odda which grew up around smelters built at the head of the Sørfjorden branch of the Hardangerfjord in the mid-twentieth century, drawing migrants from different parts of Norway.

The carbide production and the subsequent production of cyanamide was started in 1908 after the water power plant was operational and provided the necessary electricity for the arc furnaces. The plant was the largest in the world and remained operational till 2003 shortly after the plant was sold to Philipp Brothers Chemicals Inc. The Norwegian government tried to get the site recognized together with other industrial plants as a UNESCO World Heritage Site. In 2010 an international report stated: What makes Odda smelteverk so important and central to the application of Norway’s hydro power sites and pioneer chemical industry as a World Heritage Site is the fact that here in an internationally unique way the physical remains of an early chemical production process are still present.

=== Dialect ===
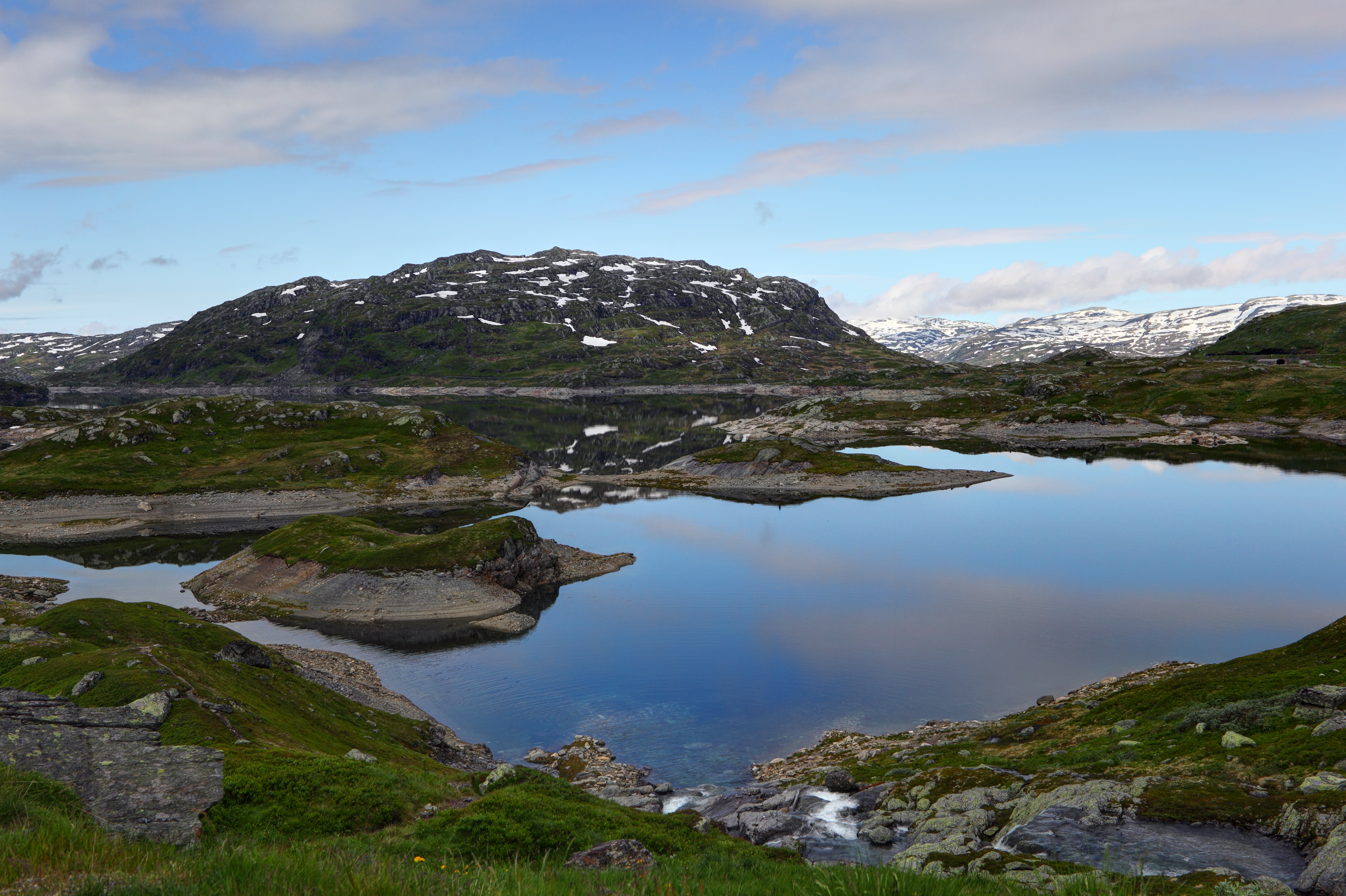
Lake Votna

Odda grew up around this smelter in the early-twentieth century, drawing migrants from different parts of Norway. As a result, there developed a new dialect, a mixture of that spoken in the home regions of the migrants - a phenomenon termed by linguists "a Koiné language". The town of Odda and neighboring village of Tyssedal - which arose in the same time and socio-economic circumstances as those of Odda - provided valuable insights to linguists studying this phenomenon. The researcher Paul Kerswill conducted an intensive study of the Norwegian spoken in the two communities, relating them to very different geographical origins: The workers in Odda came predominantly (86%) from western Norway. In Tyssedal only about one third came from western Norway; one third came from eastern Norway; and the rest from other parts of the country. The dialects that evolved in these two communities were radically different from each other, though spoken at a short geographical distance from each other.

== Population ==
Historical population
Year	1913	1920	1930	1946	1951	1960	1970	1980	1990	2000	2010	2019
Pop.	3,077	6,223	7,705	8,267	8,807	9,584	10,051	9,183	8,289	7,727	7,047	6,745
±% p.a.	—	+10.58%	+2.16%	+0.44%	+1.27%	+0.94%	+0.48%	−0.90%	−1.02%	−0.70%	−0.92%	−0.49%
Note: The municipal borders were changed in 1964, causing a significant change in the population. Source: Statistics Norway and Norwegian Historical Data Centre

== Government ==
While it existed, Odda Municipality was responsible for primary education (through 10th grade), outpatient health services, senior citizen services, welfare and other social services, zoning, economic development, and municipal roads and utilities. The municipality was governed by a municipal council of directly elected representatives. The mayor was indirectly elected by a vote of the municipal council. The municipality was under the jurisdiction of the Hardanger District Court and the Gulating Court of Appeal.

=== Municipal council ===
The municipal council (Kommunestyre) of Odda Municipality was made up of 27 representatives that were elected to four year terms. The tables below show the historical composition of the council by political party.

Odda kommunestyre 2015–2019
Party name (in Nynorsk)	Number of representatives
Labour Party (Arbeidarpartiet)	12
Conservative Party (Høgre)	6
Christian Democratic Party (Kristeleg Folkeparti)	1
Red Party (Raudt)	2
Centre Party (Senterpartiet)	2
Liberal Party (Venstre)	3
The Moderates (Moderatene)	1
Total number of members:	27
Note: On 1 January 2020, Jondal Municipality, Odda Municipality, and Ullensvang Municipality were merged to form the new Ullensvang Municipality.

Odda kommunestyre 2011–2015
Party name (in Nynorsk)	Number of representatives
Labour Party (Arbeidarpartiet)	9
Conservative Party (Høgre)	4
The Democrats (Demokratane)	2
Red Party (Raudt)	3
Centre Party (Senterpartiet)	2
Liberal Party (Venstre)	3
New Odda (Nye Odda)	4
Total number of members:	27

Odda kommunestyre 2007–2011
Party name (in Nynorsk)	Number of representatives
Labour Party (Arbeidarpartiet)	10
Progress Party (Framstegspartiet)	2
Conservative Party (Høgre)	3
Red Party (Raudt)	4
Centre Party (Senterpartiet)	2
Liberal Party (Venstre)	3
New Odda (Nye Odda)	3
Total number of members:	27

Odda kommunestyre 2003–2007
Party name (in Nynorsk)	Number of representatives
Labour Party (Arbeidarpartiet)	9
Progress Party (Framstegspartiet)	2
Conservative Party (Høgre)	3
The Democrats (Demokratane)	1
Red Electoral Alliance (Raud Valallianse)	4
Centre Party (Senterpartiet)	2
Socialist Left Party (Sosialistisk Venstreparti)	3
Liberal Party (Venstre)	3
Total number of members:	27

Odda kommunestyre 1999–2003
Party name (in Nynorsk)	Number of representatives
Labour Party (Arbeidarpartiet)	13
Progress Party (Framstegspartiet)	2
Conservative Party (Høgre)	6
Red Electoral Alliance (Raud Valallianse)	3
Centre Party (Senterpartiet)	2
Socialist Left Party (Sosialistisk Venstreparti)	4
Liberal Party (Venstre)	3
Total number of members:	33

Odda kommunestyre 1995–1999
Party name (in Nynorsk)	Number of representatives
Labour Party (Arbeidarpartiet)	17
Progress Party (Framstegspartiet)	2
Conservative Party (Høgre)	3
Red Electoral Alliance (Raud Valallianse)	3
Centre Party (Senterpartiet)	3
Socialist Left Party (Sosialistisk Venstreparti)	3
Liberal Party (Venstre)	2
Total number of members:	33

Odda kommunestyre 1991–1995
Party name (in Nynorsk)	Number of representatives
Labour Party (Arbeidarpartiet)	17
Progress Party (Framstegspartiet)	2
Conservative Party (Høgre)	5
Red Electoral Alliance (Raud Valallianse)	3
Socialist Left Party (Sosialistisk Venstreparti)	8
Liberal Party (Venstre)	2
Joint list of the Centre Party (Senterpartiet) and the Christian Democratic Party (Kristeleg Folkeparti)	4
Total number of members:	41

Odda kommunestyre 1987–1991
Party name (in Nynorsk)	Number of representatives
Labour Party (Arbeidarpartiet)	20
Progress Party (Framstegspartiet)	2
Conservative Party (Høgre)	7
Christian Democratic Party (Kristeleg Folkeparti)	1
Red Electoral Alliance (Raud Valallianse)	2
Centre Party (Senterpartiet)	1
Socialist Left Party (Sosialistisk Venstreparti)	5
Liberal Party (Venstre)	3
Total number of members:	41

Odda kommunestyre 1983–1987
Party name (in Nynorsk)	Number of representatives
Labour Party (Arbeidarpartiet)	24
Progress Party (Framstegspartiet)	1
Conservative Party (Høgre)	6
Christian Democratic Party (Kristeleg Folkeparti)	1
Red Electoral Alliance (Raud Valallianse)	2
Centre Party (Senterpartiet)	1
Socialist Left Party (Sosialistisk Venstreparti)	4
Liberal Party (Venstre)	2
Total number of members:	41

Odda kommunestyre 1979–1983
Party name (in Nynorsk)	Number of representatives
Labour Party (Arbeidarpartiet)	17
Conservative Party (Høgre)	10
Communist Party (Kommunistiske Parti)	1
Christian Democratic Party (Kristeleg Folkeparti)	2
New People's Party (Nye Folkepartiet)	1
Red Electoral Alliance (Raud Valallianse)	3
Centre Party (Senterpartiet)	1
Socialist Left Party (Sosialistisk Venstreparti)	4
Liberal Party (Venstre)	2
Total number of members:	41

Odda kommunestyre 1975–1979
Party name (in Nynorsk)	Number of representatives
Labour Party (Arbeidarpartiet)	19
Christian Democratic Party (Kristeleg Folkeparti)	4
New People's Party (Nye Folkepartiet)	2
Red Electoral Alliance (Raud Valallianse)	1
Socialist Left Party (Sosialistisk Venstreparti)	7
Liberal Party (Venstre)	2
Joint list of the Conservative Party (Høgre) and the Centre Party (Senterpartiet)	6
Total number of members:	41

Odda kommunestyre 1971–1975
Party name (in Nynorsk)	Number of representatives
Labour Party (Arbeidarpartiet)	18
Conservative Party (Høgre)	2
Communist Party (Kommunistiske Parti)	4
Centre Party (Senterpartiet)	2
Socialist People's Party (Sosialistisk Folkeparti)	3
Liberal Party (Venstre)	7
Local List(s) (Lokale lister)	5
Total number of members:	41

Odda kommunestyre 1967–1971
Party name (in Nynorsk)	Number of representatives
Labour Party (Arbeidarpartiet)	20
Conservative Party (Høgre)	3
Communist Party (Kommunistiske Parti)	4
Centre Party (Senterpartiet)	1
Socialist People's Party (Sosialistisk Folkeparti)	5
Liberal Party (Venstre)	8
Total number of members:	41

Odda kommunestyre 1963–1967
Party name (in Nynorsk)	Number of representatives
Labour Party (Arbeidarpartiet)	22
Conservative Party (Høgre)	3
Communist Party (Kommunistiske Parti)	4
Centre Party (Senterpartiet)	1
Socialist People's Party (Sosialistisk Folkeparti)	3
Liberal Party (Venstre)	8
Total number of members:	41
Note: On 1 January 1964, Røldal Municipality became part of Odda Municipality.

Odda heradsstyre 1959–1963
Party name (in Nynorsk)	Number of representatives
Labour Party (Arbeidarpartiet)	17
Conservative Party (Høgre)	2
Communist Party (Kommunistiske Parti)	7
Centre Party (Senterpartiet)	1
Liberal Party (Venstre)	6
Total number of members:	33

Odda heradsstyre 1955–1959
Party name (in Nynorsk)	Number of representatives
Labour Party (Arbeidarpartiet)	16
Conservative Party (Høgre)	2
Communist Party (Kommunistiske Parti)	8
Liberal Party (Venstre)	7
Total number of members:	33

Odda heradsstyre 1951–1955
Party name (in Nynorsk)	Number of representatives
Labour Party (Arbeidarpartiet)	14
Conservative Party (Høgre)	1
Communist Party (Kommunistiske Parti)	11
Liberal Party (Venstre)	5
Joint List(s) of Non-Socialist Parties (Borgarlege Felleslister)	1
Total number of members:	32

Odda heradsstyre 1947–1951
Party name (in Nynorsk)	Number of representatives
Labour Party (Arbeidarpartiet)	11
Conservative Party (Høgre)	1
Communist Party (Kommunistiske Parti)	12
Liberal Party (Venstre)	8
Total number of members:	32

Odda heradsstyre 1945–1947
Party name (in Nynorsk)	Number of representatives
Labour Party (Arbeidarpartiet)	10
Communist Party (Kommunistiske Parti)	14
Joint List(s) of Non-Socialist Parties (Borgarlege Felleslister)	8
Total number of members:	32

Odda heradsstyre 1937–1941*
Party name (in Nynorsk)	Number of representatives
Labour Party (Arbeidarpartiet)	14
Communist Party (Kommunistiske Parti)	7
Joint List(s) of Non-Socialist Parties (Borgarlege Felleslister)	10
Local List(s) (Lokale lister)	1
Total number of members:	32
Note: Due to the German occupation of Norway during World War II, no elections were held for new municipal councils until after the war ended in 1945.

=== Mayors ===
The mayor (Norwegian: ordfører) of Odda Municipality was the political leader of the municipality and the chairperson of the municipal council. The following people have held this position:

- 1913–1919: Johannes Apold
- 1920–1922: Guttorm Narum
- 1923–1925: Olav O. Aga
- 1926–1931: Karl Bøthun
- 1932–1941: Lars Nilsen Hjelle
- 1945–1945: Jakob Pettersen
- 1946–1951: Johan Slåttelid
- 1952–1971: Sverre Indrebø
- 1972–1979: Einar Tveit
- 1980–1985: Leiv Stensland
- 1986–1995: Knut Erdal
- 1995–2007: Toralv Mikkelsen
- 2007–2011: Gard Folkvord
- 2011–2015: John Opdal
- 2015–2019: Roald Aga Haug

== Geography ==
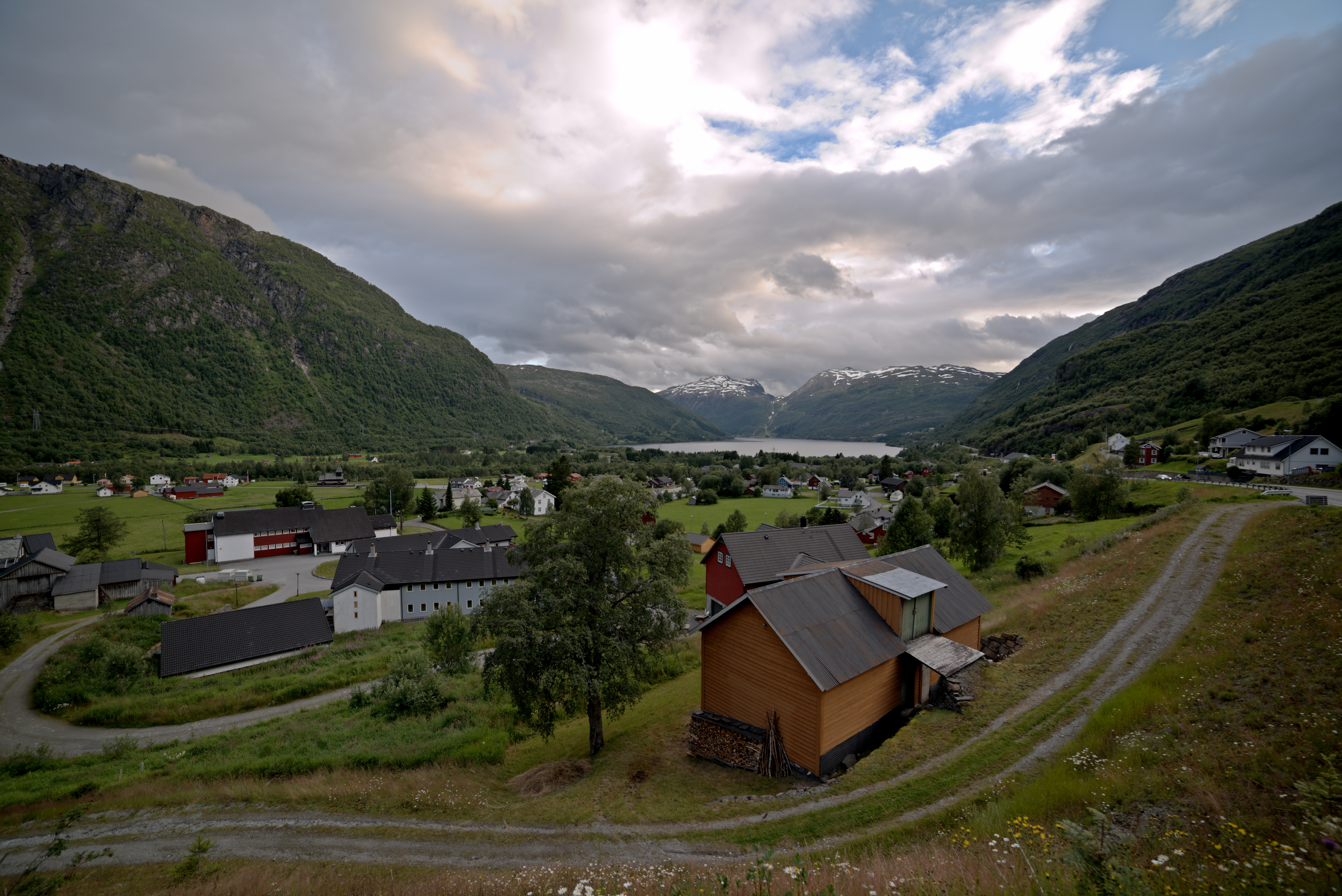
View of the village of Røldal

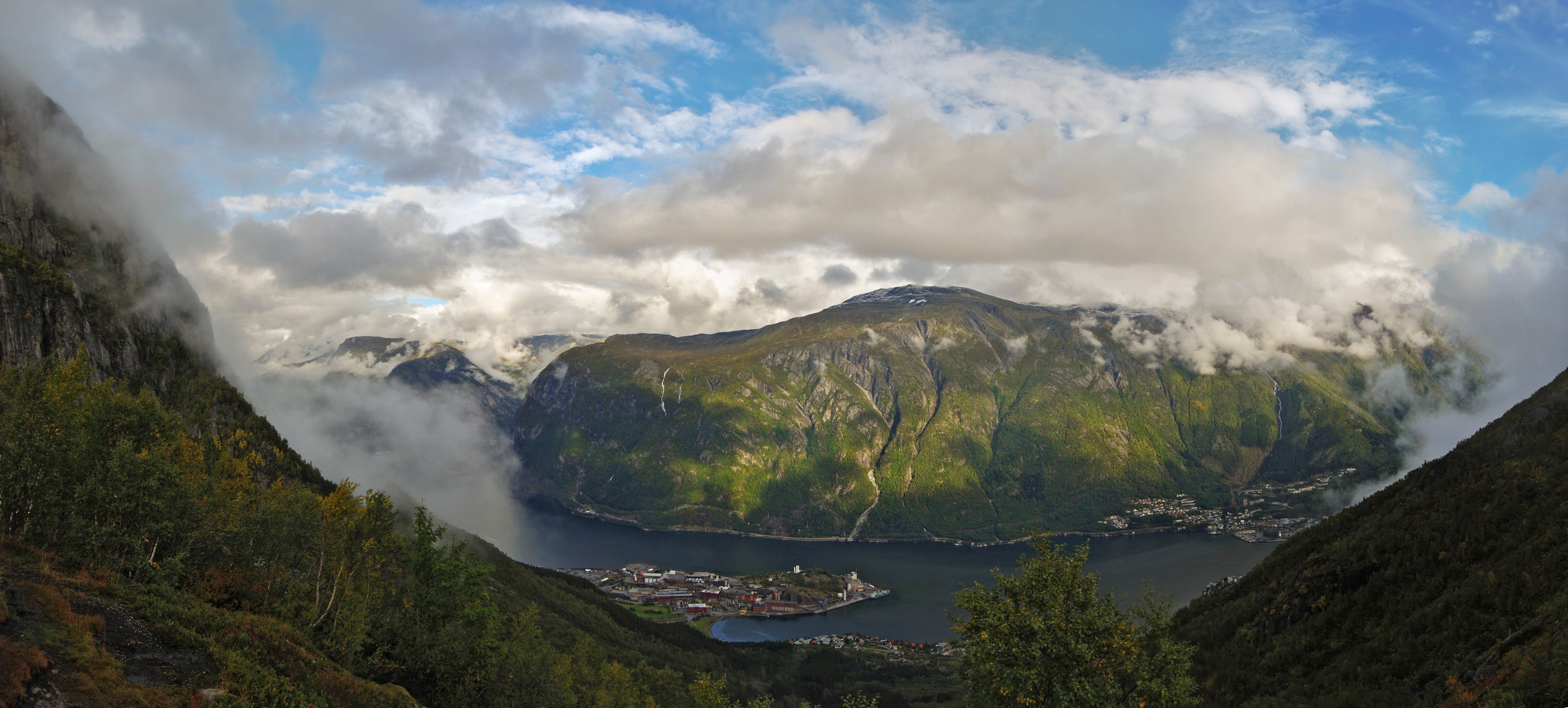
View of Eitrheim (centre) and Odda town (right)

Odda Municipality was very mountainous and the settlements were all located in valleys. The highest point in the municipality was the 1,721.2-metre (5,647 ft) tall mountain Sandfloegga. Because of the many mountains, there were many large waterfalls including Låtefossen, Espelandsfossen, and Tyssestrengene. There are also many large lakes such as Sandvinvatnet, Votna, Valldalsvatnet, Røldalsvatnet, Ringedalsvatnet, Langavatnet, and parts of Ståvatn. On top of the high mountains in western Odda is the vast Folgefonna glacier, including the Buarbreen glacier near the town of Odda. Part of Folgefonna National Park was in Odda as well. The western part of the municipality sat on top of the southern part of the Hardangervidda plateau, which also includes part of the Hardangervidda National Park. The mountains Kistenuten and Sandfloegga are located on the plateau.

Ullensvang Municipality was located to the north, Vinje Municipality (in Telemark county) was located to the east, Suldal Municipality and Sauda Municipality (both in Rogaland county) were located to the south, Etne Municipality was located to the southwest, and Kvinnherad Municipality was located to the west.

== Transportation ==
The municipality sat at a crossroads of two major roads. The European route E134 highway runs east–west through Odda municipality, cutting through many mountains in the Røldal Tunnel, Horda Tunnel, Austmannali Tunnel, and Haukeli Tunnel. The other main road is the Norwegian National Road 13 which runs north–south through the municipality. The two roads run together from Seljestad to Håra. At Eitrheim, the Folgefonna Tunnel connects Odda to the neighboring area of Mauranger in Kvinnherad Municipality, cutting through the mountains under the Folgefonna glacier.

== In popular culture ==
The town is used as the backdrop for the fictional town of Edda in the Netflix Norwegian-language drama series Ragnarok.

== See also ==
- List of former municipalities of Norway
