= Røldal Municipality =

Former municipality in Hordaland, Norway

Røldal Municipality Røldal herad
- Former municipality
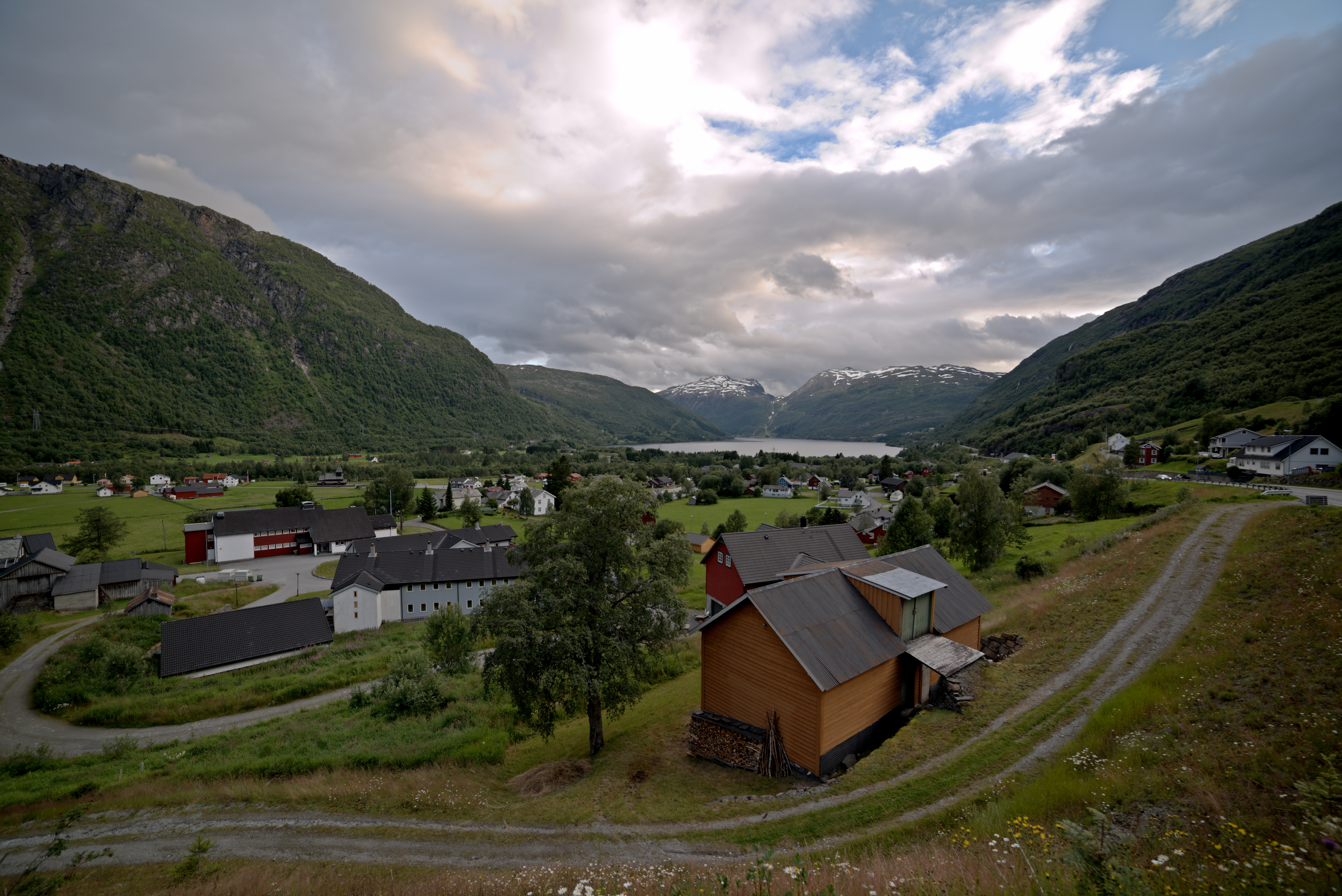
- View of the Røldal area

- Hordaland within Norway

- Røldal within Hordaland
- Coordinates: 59°50′00″N 06°48′53″E
- Country: Norway
- County: Hordaland
- District: Hardanger
- Established: 1 Jan 1838
  - Created as: Formannskapsdistrikt
- Disestablished: 1 Jan 1964
  - Succeeded by: Odda Municipality
- Administrative centre: Røldal

Government
  - Mayor (1962–1963): Nils Medhus (Sp)

Area (upon dissolution)
  - Total: 670.9 km^{2} (259.0 sq mi)
  - Rank: #145 in Norway
- Highest elevation: 1,721.2 m (5,647 ft)

Population (1963)
  - Total: 608
  - Rank: #667 in Norway
  - Density: 0.9/km^{2} (2.3/sq mi)
  - Change (10 years): ▼ −4.4%
- Demonym: Røldøl

Official language
  - Norwegian form: Nynorsk
- Time zone: UTC+01:00 (CET)
  - Summer (DST): UTC+02:00 (CEST)
- ISO 3166 code: NO-1229

Røldal is a former municipality in the old Hordaland county, Norway. The 670.9-square-kilometre (259.0 sq mi) municipality existed from 1838 until its dissolution in 1964. The area is now part of Ullensvang Municipality in the traditional district of Hardanger in Vestland county. The administrative centre was the village of Røldal. Other villages in the municipality included Botnen and Håra.

Prior to its dissolution in 1964, the 670.9-square-kilometre (259.0 sq mi) municipality was the 145th largest by area out of the 689 municipalities in Norway. Røldal Municipality was the 667th most populous municipality in Norway with a population of about 608. The municipality's population density was 0.9 inhabitants per square kilometre (2.3/sq mi) and its population had decreased by 4.4% over the previous 10-year period.

== General information ==
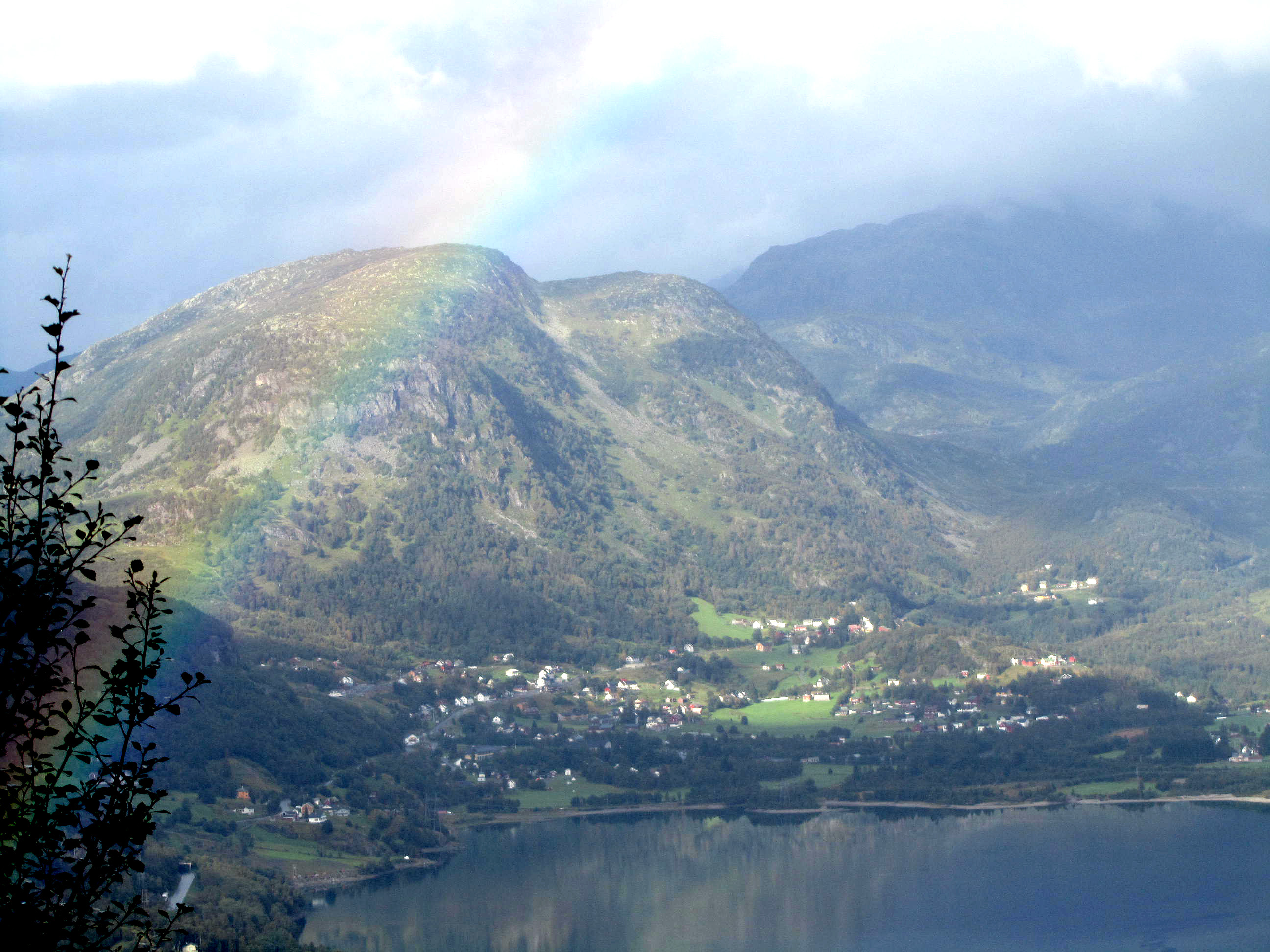
View of the Røldal area

Historically, the Røldal area was part of the parish of Suldal (to the south), with Røldal being an annex to the main parish. Suldal and Røldal each had their own churches, but they shared a priest since Røldal was a sparsely populated area and could not support their own priest. Suldal was located in Stavanger county and Røldal was located in Søndre Bergenhus county. This arrangement was not a problem until 1837 when the formannskapsdistrikt law was passed. The law called for each parish to become a municipality led by a self-governing council starting in 1838. It also said that each municipality must be within one county, not two. Therefore, Suldal and Røldal had to be divided and starting on 1 January 1838, Røldal Municipality was established in Søndre Bergenhus county.

During the 1960s, there were many municipal mergers across Norway due to the work of the Schei Committee. The sparsely populated Røldal Municipality (population: 676) existed until 1 January 1964 when it was merged into the larger neighboring Odda Municipality (population: 9,487).

=== Name ===
The municipality (originally the parish) is named after the old Røldal farm (Old Norse: Rœrgudalr) since the first Røldal Church was built there. The village was named after the Røldalen valley in which it is located. The first element comes from the local river name, Røyrga (now known as the Storelva river). The river name is the genitive case of the word røyrr which means "rocky ground" or "rock heap". The last element is dalr which means "valley" or "dale".

=== Churches ===
The Church of Norway had one parish (sokn) within Røldal Municipality. At the time of the municipal dissolution, it was part of the Røldal prestegjeld and the Hardanger og Voss prosti (deanery) in the Diocese of Bjørgvin.

Churches in Røldal Municipality
Parish (sokn)	Church name	Location of the church	Year built
Røldal	Røldal Stave Church	Røldal	1250

== Geography ==
The municipality encompassed the Røldalen valley and some small side valleys, as well as a large area up on the vast Hardangervidda plateau. Historically, Røldal was an important trade and transportation route between Eastern and Western Norway. The large lakes Røldalsvatnet, Votna, and Valldalsvatnet were located in the municipality. The highest point in the municipality was the 1,721.2-metre (5,647 ft) tall mountain Sandfloegga.

Ullensvang Municipality was to the north, Vinje Municipality (in Telemark county) was to the east, Suldal Municipality (in Rogaland county) was to the south, Sauda Municipality (also in Rogaland county) was to the southwest, and Odda Municipality was to the west.

== Government ==
While it existed, Røldal Municipality was responsible for primary education (through 10th grade), outpatient health services, senior citizen services, welfare and other social services, zoning, economic development, and municipal roads and utilities. The municipality was governed by a municipal council of directly elected representatives. The mayor was indirectly elected by a vote of the municipal council. The municipality was under the jurisdiction of the Gulating Court of Appeal.

=== Municipal council ===
The municipal council (Heradsstyre) of Røldal Municipality was made up of 13 representatives that were elected to four year terms. The tables below show the historical composition of the council by political party.

Røldal heradsstyre 1959–1963
Party name (in Nynorsk)	Number of representatives
Labour Party (Arbeidarpartiet)	5
Centre Party (Senterpartiet)	3
Liberal Party (Venstre)	5
Total number of members:	13
Note: On 1 January 1964, Røldal Municipality became part of Odda Municipality.

Røldal heradsstyre 1955–1959
Party name (in Nynorsk)	Number of representatives
Labour Party (Arbeidarpartiet)	5
Farmers' Party (Bondepartiet)	4
Liberal Party (Venstre)	4
Total number of members:	13

Røldal heradsstyre 1951–1955
Party name (in Nynorsk)	Number of representatives
Labour Party (Arbeidarpartiet)	5
Farmers' Party (Bondepartiet)	4
Liberal Party (Venstre)	1
Joint List(s) of Non-Socialist Parties (Borgarlege Felleslister)	2
Total number of members:	12

Røldal heradsstyre 1947–1951
Party name (in Nynorsk)	Number of representatives
Labour Party (Arbeidarpartiet)	4
Farmers' Party (Bondepartiet)	4
Liberal Party (Venstre)	4
Total number of members:	12

Røldal heradsstyre 1937–1941*
Party name (in Nynorsk)	Number of representatives
Labour Party (Arbeidarpartiet)	5
Liberal Party (Venstre)	2
Joint List(s) of Non-Socialist Parties (Borgarlege Felleslister)	5
Total number of members:	12
Note: Due to the German occupation of Norway during World War II, no elections were held for new municipal councils until after the war ended in 1945.

=== Mayors ===
The mayor (Nynorsk: ordførar) of Røldal Municipality was the political leader of the municipality and the chairperson of the municipal council. The following people have held this position:

- 1838–1841: Helleik Nielsen Rabbe
- 1842–1843: Nils Amundsen Tufte
- 1844–1850: Ole Jacobsen Tufte
- 1850–1851: Helleik Nielsen Rabbe
- 1852–1853: Ole Jacobsen Tufte
- 1854–1855: Svend Olsen Berge
- 1856–1861: Ole Jacobsen Tufte
- 1862–1865: Eivind Osmundsen Berge
- 1866–1867: Ole Nielsen Haarenæs
- 1868–1869: Eivind Osmundsen Berge
- 1870–1871: Ole Olsen Hagen
- 1872–1873: Ole Nilsen Hamre
- 1874–1877: Eivind Osmundsen Berge
- 1878–1891: Ole Nilsen Hamre
- 1892–1898: Rev. Peder S. Ringdal
- 1899–1901: Usmund Seim
- 1902–1907: Asmund J. Tvedt
- 1908–1911: O. Gryting
- 1912–1913: Asmund J. Tvedt
- 1914–1919: H.N. Prestegaard
- 1920–1925: Jakob Tveit
- 1926–1929: H.N. Prestegaard
- 1930–1931: Jakob Tveit
- 1932–1934: H.N. Prestegaard
- 1935–1941: Nils G. Grave (V)
- 1942–1945: Nils Medhus
- 1945–1945: Nils G. Grave
- 1946–1947: Olav Tufte (Ap)
- 1948–1951: Obert Øverland (V)
- 1952–1956: Nils K. Hagen (Ap)
- 1956–1959: Obert Øverland (V)
- 1959–1961: Ingvald Øvregaard (Ap)
- 1962–1963: Nils Medhus (Sp)

== See also ==
- List of former municipalities of Norway
