= Domenico Erdmann =

Norwegian painter (1879–1940)

Norwegian Institute of Technology logo

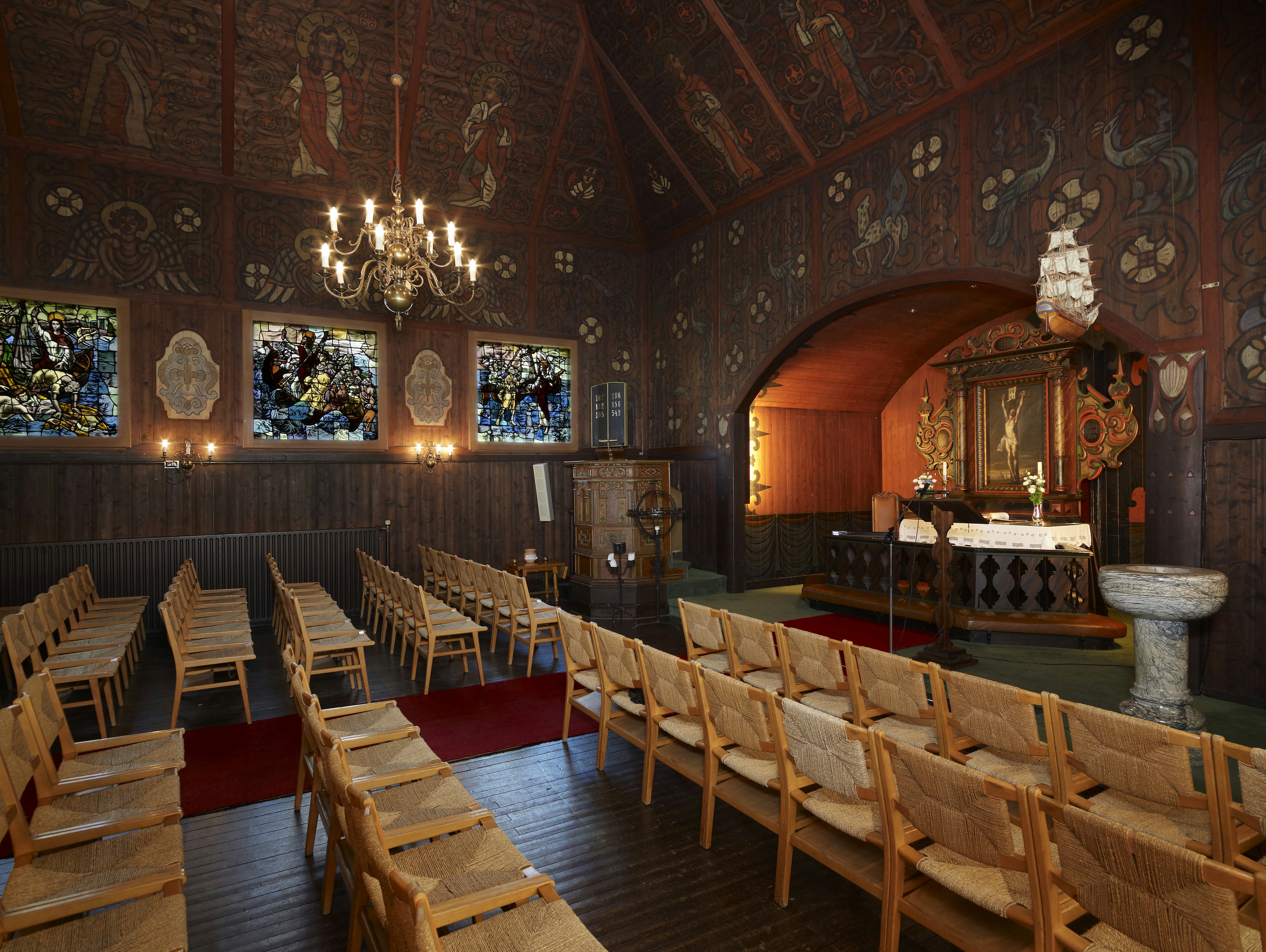
Interior of the Norwegian Seamen's Church in Rotterdam

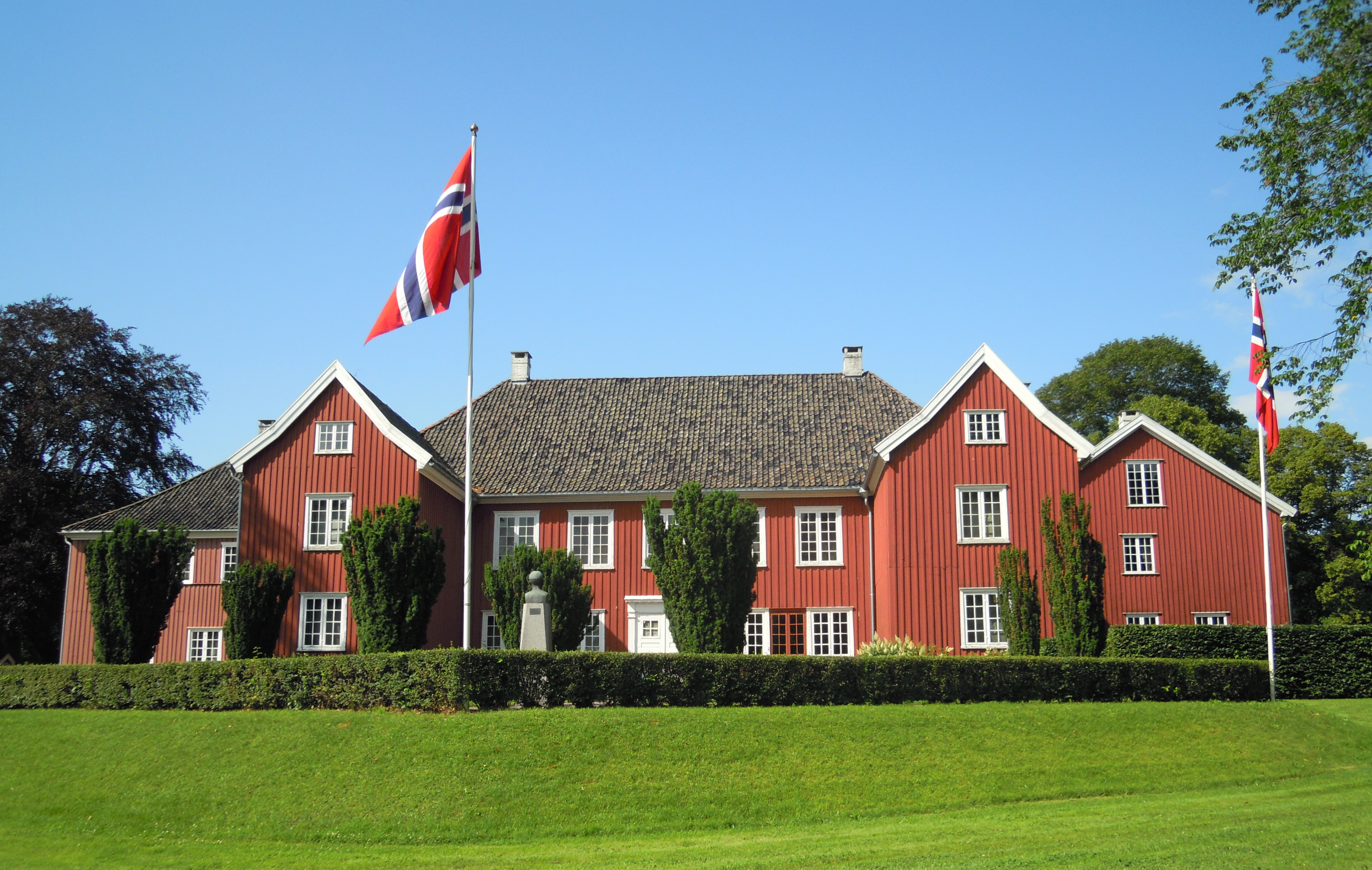
Herregården Manor in Larvik

Domenico Juul Erdmann (March 23, 1879 – October 5, 1940) was a Norwegian painter, designer, decorator, and conservation adviser. He was a technical consultant and executive conservator in a number of Norwegian churches.

== Biography ==
Erdmann was born in Bergen, Norway. He was the son of Hansine Cathrine Landi (1850–1915) and Hans Johan Johannesen (1851–1932). His father was a sculptor and drawing teacher.

He was a student of painter Oscar Matthiesen (1861–1957) from 1896. He was a conservator at Viborg Cathedral when Joakim Skovgaard (1856–1933) started his fresco work at Viborg Cathedral. Erdmann followed Matthiesen to Berlin and Munich and also visited France and Italy where he learned fresco techniques, decorative painting, and church restoration.

After he returned to Norway in 1903, he worked together with Eilif Peterssen (1852–1928) on the decoration of Ullern Church in Oslo. Erdmann studied church restoration in Denmark in 1912, and was made a conservation adviser in 1919. He also worked as a decorator and designer with architect Arnstein Arneberg (1882–1961). He performed design work for O. Mustad & Søn in Kristiania (now Oslo) from 1916 to 1921. In 1912, he received an assignment from the Society for the Preservation of Ancient Norwegian Monuments (Fortidsminneforeningen) for the investigation and restoration of historic Norwegian church interiors.

Erdmann won the open competition for the logo for the Norwegian Institute of Technology in 1912. The logo was used until the establishment of the Norwegian University of Science and Technology in 1996. Erdmann was responsible for decorations in the Norwegian Seamen's Church in Rotterdam (1914). The church interior with wall paintings, altar frame, and baptismal font were designed by Erdmann. Erdmann also oversaw a complete restoration of Herregården Manor in Larvik (1920–1929).

Erdmann's book Norsk dekorativ maling fra reformasjonen til romantikken (1940) describes his experiences with restoration in many Norwegian churches, including Stavern Church, Røldal Stave Church, Skjeberg Church, Fluberg Church, and Drøbak Church, as well as the manor in Larvik (Herregården i Larvik) and the Norwegian Military Academy.

== Published works ==
- Fredriksverns kirke og kirkegaard. Fredriksvern (Fredriksvern, 1926)
- Norsk dekorativ maling fra reformasjonen til romantikken (Oslo, 1940)
