= Gard Folkvord =

Norwegian politician (born 1969)

Gard Folkvord (born 10 January 1969 in Voss Municipality) is a Norwegian politician for the Labour Party.

He served as a deputy representative to the Norwegian Parliament from Hordaland during the terms 1993–1997, 1997–2001 and 2001–2005. He was a regular representative from 1996 to 1997 and 2000 to 2001, covering for Ranveig Frøiland and Grete Knudsen who were appointed to the cabinet Jagland and first cabinet Stoltenberg respectively.

On the local level he was a member of the executive committee of the municipal council of Odda Municipality from 1991 to 2003. In 2007 he returned to local politics to become mayor.
