= Skare =

Village in Ullensvang Municipality, Norway

Skare Skarde
- Village
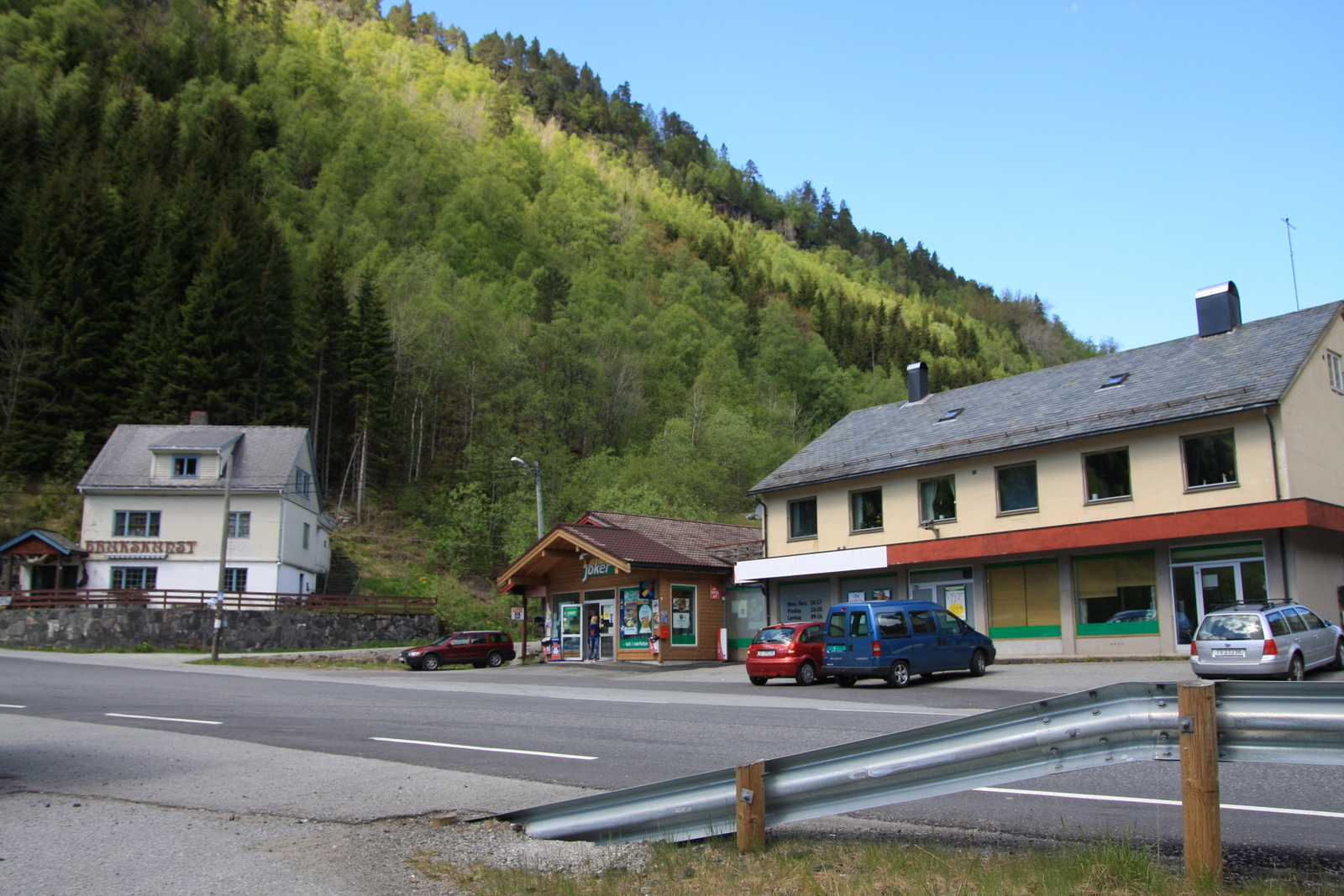
- View of the village
- Interactive map of Skare
- Coordinates: 59.93333°N 6.6°E
- Country: Norway
- Region: Western Norway
- County: Vestland
- District: Hardanger
- Municipality: Ullensvang Municipality

Area
  - Total: 0.34 km^{2} (0.13 sq mi)
- Elevation: 416 m (1,365 ft)

Population (2025)
  - Total: 330
  - Density: 971/km^{2} (2,510/sq mi)
- Time zone: UTC+01:00 (CET)
  - Summer (DST): UTC+02:00 (CEST)
- Post Code: 5763 Skare

Skare is a village in Ullensvang Municipality in Vestland county, Norway. The village is located about 15 kilometres (9.3 mi) straight south of the town of Odda and about 5 kilometres (3.1 mi) northwest of the village of Seljestad. The village sits at the junction of Norwegian National Road 13 and European route E134. Skare Church is located in the village.

The 0.34-square-kilometre (84-acre) village has a population (2025) of 330 and a population density of 971 inhabitants per square kilometre (2,510/sq mi).

The Espelandsfossen waterfall lies about 1.5 kilometres (0.93 mi) north of the village, just off the side of the National Road 13.

== Climate ==
Climate data for Skare (255 m, extremes 2018-)
Month	Jan	Feb	Mar	Apr	May	Jun	Jul	Aug	Sep	Oct	Nov	Dec	Year
Record high °C (°F)	9.6 (49.3)	12.2 (54.0)	13.1 (55.6)	21.4 (70.5)	25.4 (77.7)	30.0 (86.0)	32.7 (90.9)	28.4 (83.1)	25.5 (77.9)	18.6 (65.5)	13.2 (55.8)	10.9 (51.6)	32.7 (90.9)
Daily mean °C (°F)	−1.9 (28.6)	−2.0 (28.4)	0.3 (32.5)	3.6 (38.5)	8.2 (46.8)	11.5 (52.7)	14.3 (57.7)	13.3 (55.9)	9.8 (49.6)	5.0 (41.0)	0.4 (32.7)	−1.7 (28.9)	5.1 (41.1)
Record low °C (°F)	−20.5 (−4.9)	−21.6 (−6.9)	−17.1 (1.2)	−9.2 (15.4)	−4.3 (24.3)	−0.1 (31.8)	2.6 (36.7)	2.1 (35.8)	−1.2 (29.8)	−7.9 (17.8)	−13.8 (7.2)	−17.7 (0.1)	−21.6 (−6.9)
Source: yr.no/Norwegian Meteorological Institute
