= Skare Church =

Church in Vestland, Norway

- Skare kyrkje
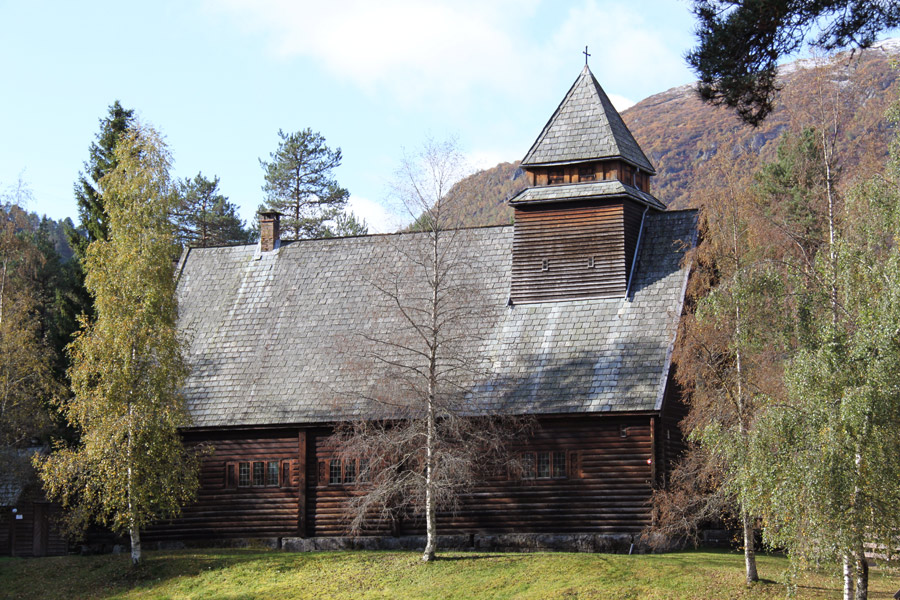
- View of the church
- Skare Church
- 59°55′56″N 6°35′37″E
- Location: Ullensvang, Vestland
- Country: Norway
- Denomination: Church of Norway
- Churchmanship: Evangelical Lutheran

History
- Status: Parish church
- Founded: 1926
- Consecrated: 5 October 1926

Architecture
- Functional status: Active
- Architect: Olaf Nordhagen
- Architectural type: Long church
- Style: National Romantic style
- Completed: 1926 (100 years ago)

Specifications
- Capacity: 230
- Materials: Wood

Administration
- Diocese: Bjørgvin bispedømme
- Deanery: Hardanger og Voss prosti
- Parish: Skare
- Norwegian Cultural Heritage Site
- Type: Church
- Status: Listed
- ID: 85444

Skare Church (Norwegian: Skare kyrkje) is a parish church of the Church of Norway in Ullensvang Municipality in Vestland county, Norway. It is located in the village of Skare. It is the church for the Skare parish, which is part of the Hardanger og Voss prosti (deanery) in the Diocese of Bjørgvin. The brown, wooden church was built in a long church design in 1926 using plans drawn up by the architect Olaf Nordhagen. The church seats about 230 people.

== History ==
Planning for a new church in Skare began during the 1910s. The new building was designed by Olaf Nordhagen and the lead builder was Eirik Kvammen. The plans for the National Romantic style church were approved in 1917. The church was consecrated on 5 October 1926 by Bishop Peter Hognestad.

== See also ==
- List of churches in Bjørgvin
