= Odda Church =

Church in Vestland, Norway

- Odda kyrkje
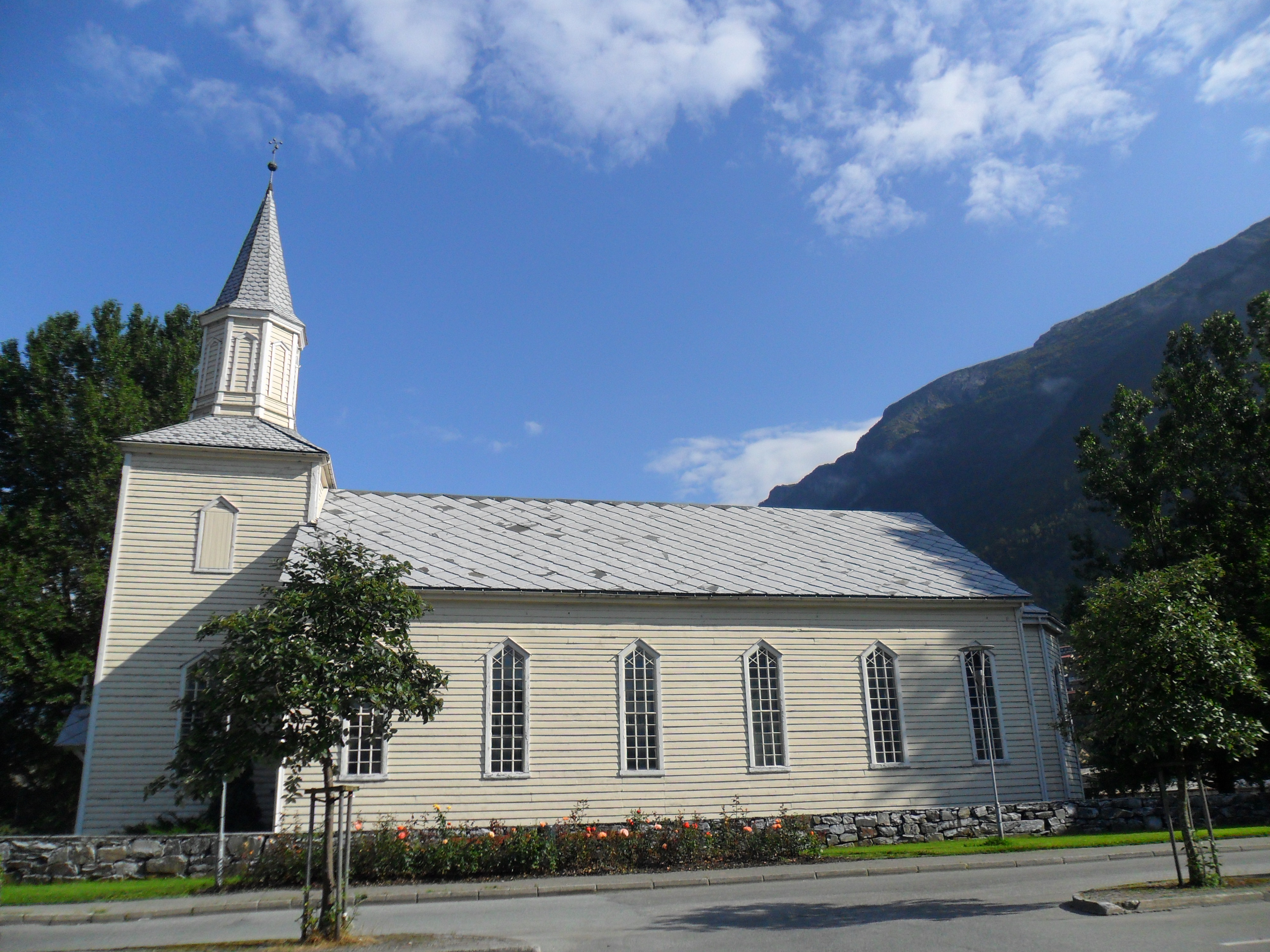
- View of the church
- Odda Church
- 60°04′13″N 6°32′52″E
- Location: Ullensvang, Vestland
- Country: Norway
- Denomination: Church of Norway
- Previous denomination: Catholic Church
- Churchmanship: Evangelical Lutheran

History
- Status: Parish church
- Founded: 13th century
- Consecrated: 4 Nov 1870

Architecture
- Functional status: Active
- Architect: C. Erichsen
- Architectural type: Long church
- Completed: 1870 (156 years ago)

Specifications
- Capacity: 500
- Materials: Wood

Administration
- Diocese: Bjørgvin bispedømme
- Deanery: Hardanger og Voss prosti
- Parish: Odda
- Norwegian Cultural Heritage Site
- Type: Church
- Status: Not listed
- ID: 85196

Odda Church (Norwegian: Odda kyrkje) is a parish church of the Church of Norway in Ullensvang Municipality in Vestland county, Norway. It is located in the town of Odda. It is the church for the Odda parish which is part of the Hardanger og Voss prosti (deanery) in the Diocese of Bjørgvin. The off-white, wooden church was built in a long church design in 1870 using plans drawn up the architect C. Erichsen. The church seats about 500 people.

== History ==
The first church in Odda was a stone church that was located about 50 metres (160 ft) the northeast of the present church site. That first church was built between the years 1250 and 1300. There may have been a wooden church on the site before that time, but that is not known. The earliest existing historical records of the church date back to the year 1309, but was not new that year. The stone church had a rectangular nave that measured about 13.2 by 10.7 metres (43 ft × 35 ft) and a narrower, rectangular choir that measured about 6.3 by 7.5 metres (21 ft × 25 ft). There was also a wooden church porch on the west end of the nave. During the 1850s and 1860s, there was quite a local discussion about whether to expand the old church or to tear it down and build a new church. In 1869, the six-century old church was torn down.

A new wooden long church was built about 50 metres (160 ft) to the southwest soon after the demolition of the old church. The stone from the old church was used as the foundation for the new church. The new church was designed by the architect C. Erichsen, based on the similar design for the nearby Øystese Church. The lead builder for the church was Askjel Aase. The new church was consecrated on 4 November 1870 by the Bishop Peter Hersleb Graah Birkeland. By the early 20th century, the graveyard surrounding the church was getting full, so a new cemetery site was chosen in 1930, at Berjaflot about 1 kilometre (0.62 mi) to the south. A small chapel was built at the cemetery in 1934, called Berjaflot Chapel. In 1955, the church was renovated extensively using designs by the architect Torgeir Alvsaker. The restoration also included an addition to the north of the chancel in addition to new wall panelling, new windows, and new paint.

== Media gallery ==
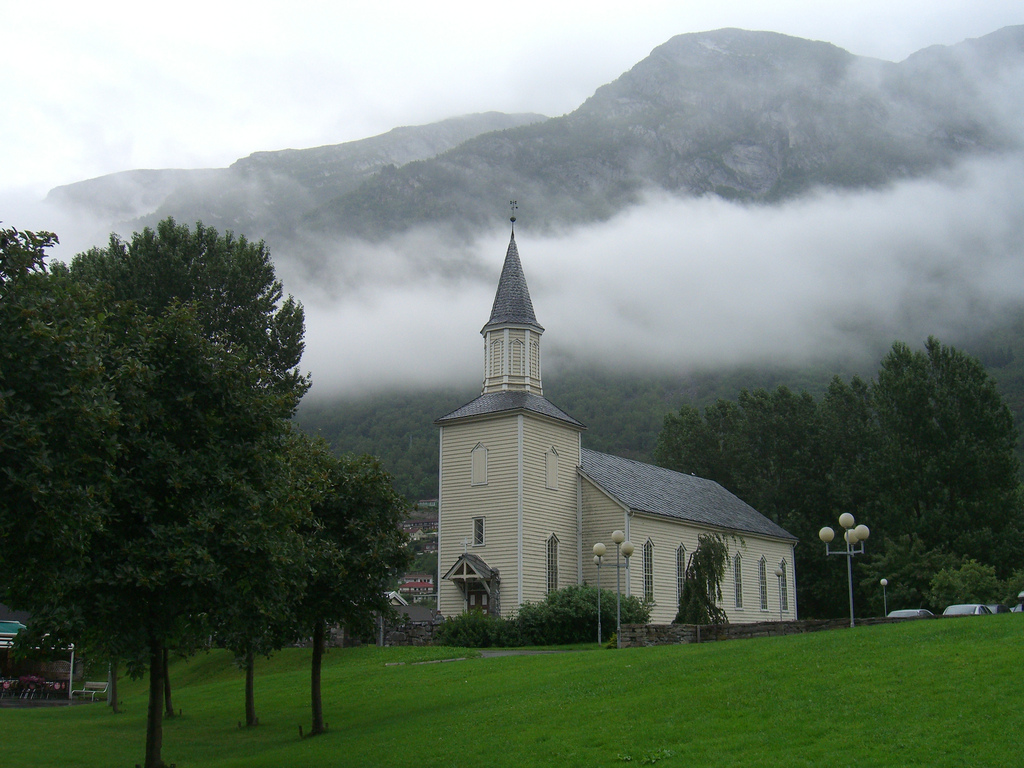
Exterior view

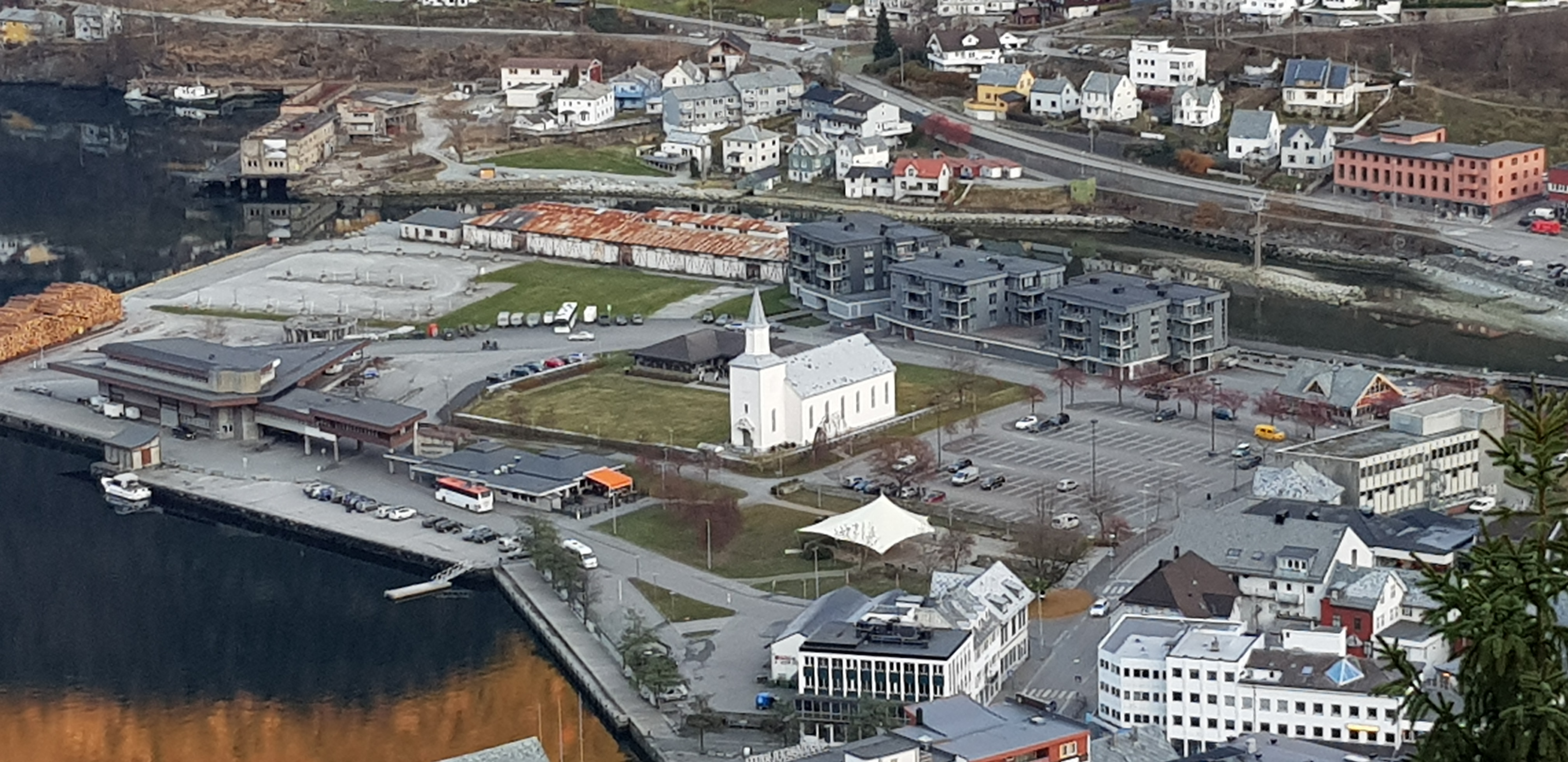
Aerial view

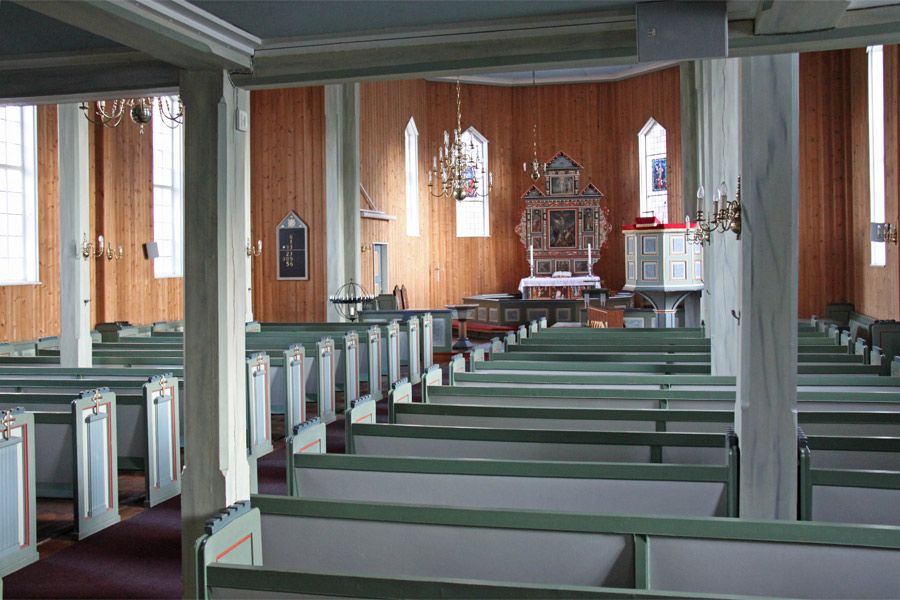
Interior view

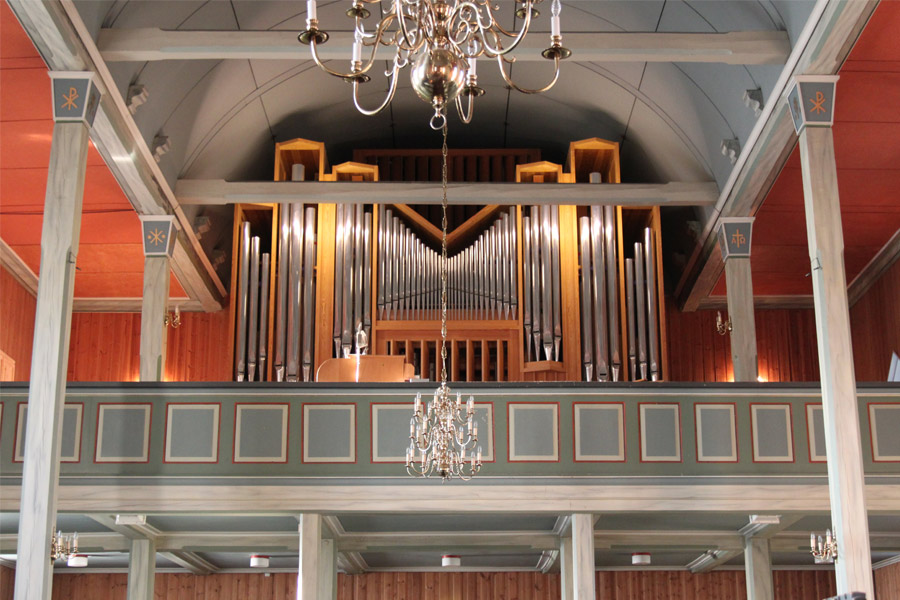
View of the back balcony and organ

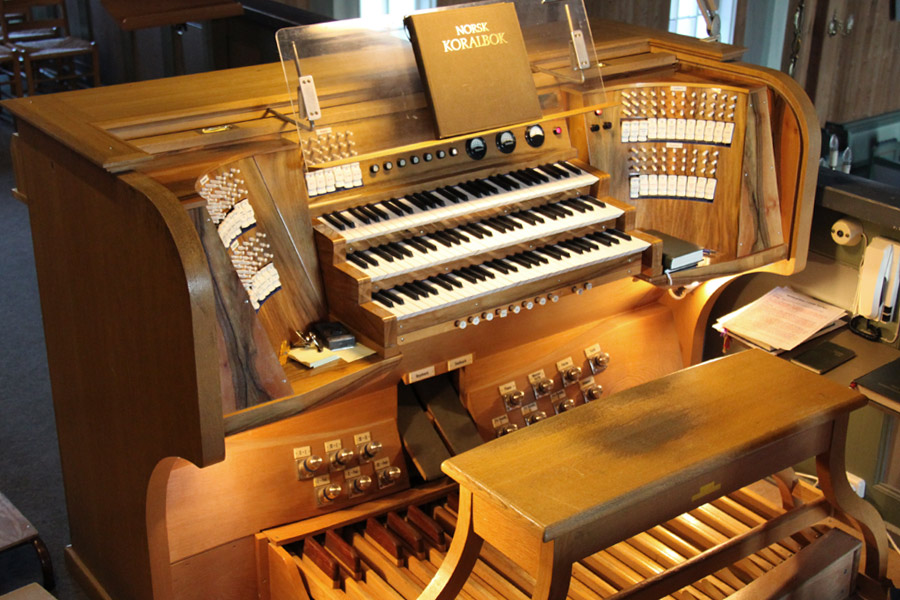
Close-up of the organ

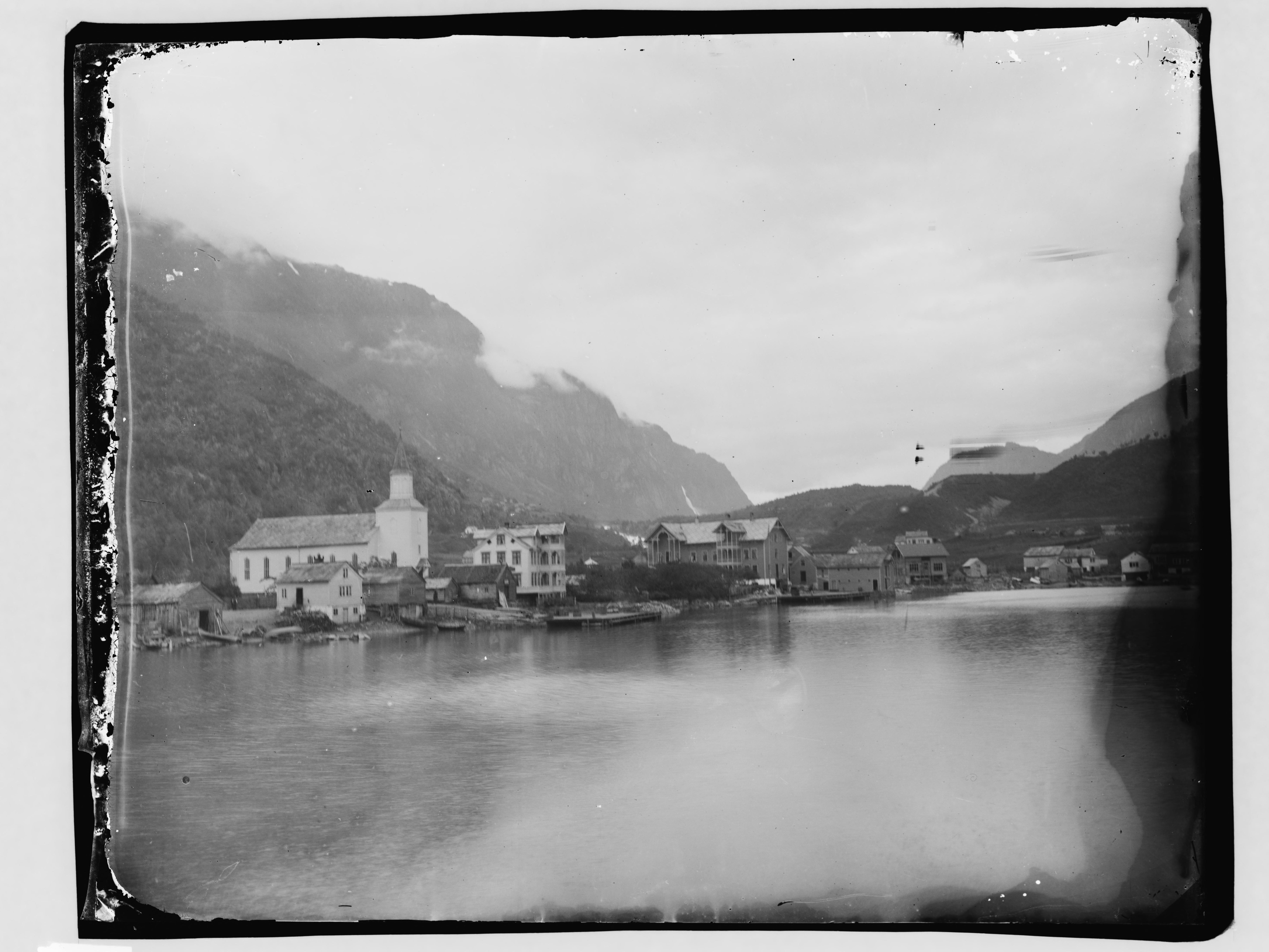
Exterior view (c. 1895)

== See also ==
- List of churches in Bjørgvin
