= Espelandsfossen (Odda) =

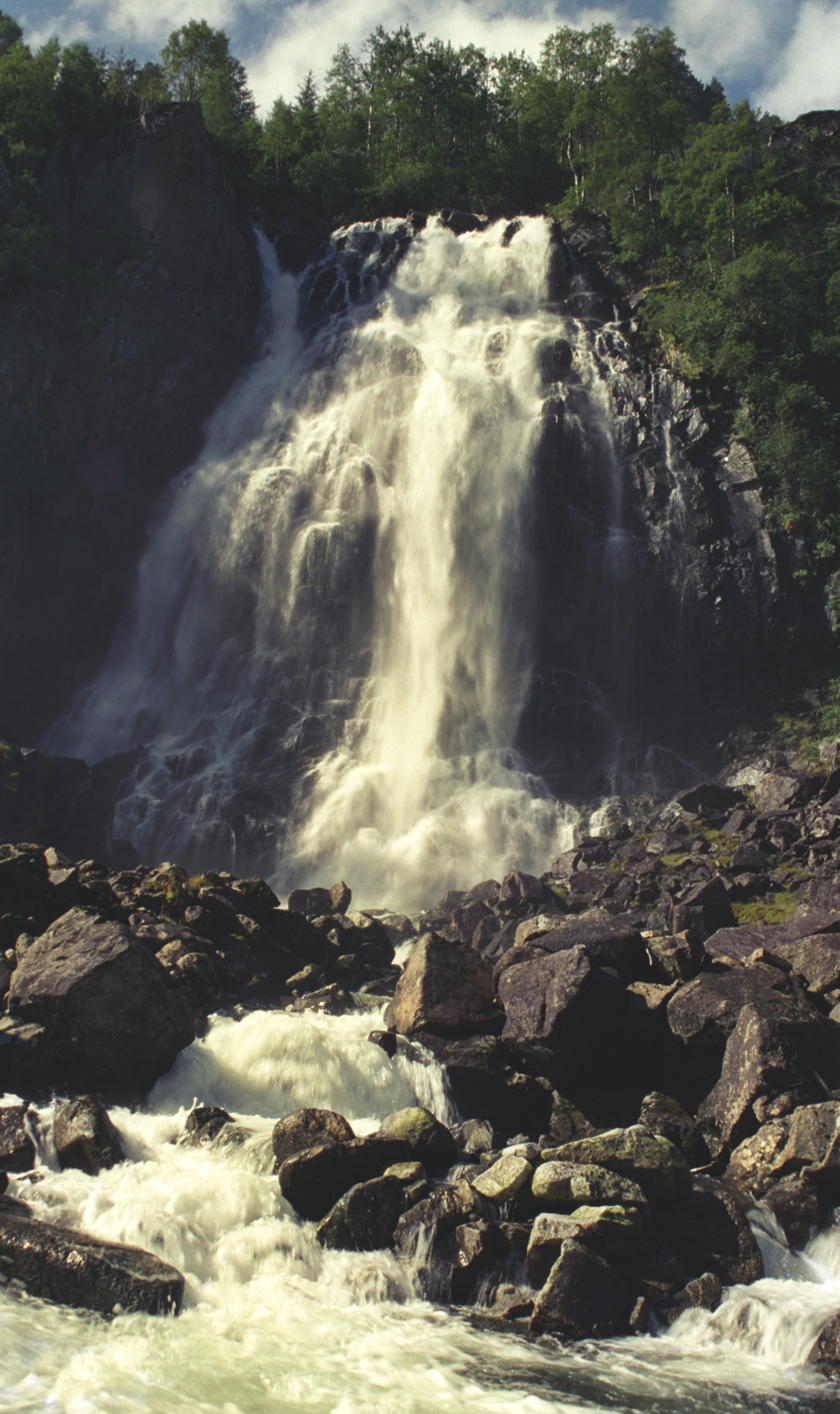
- Espelandsfossen in September 1997
- Interactive map of Espelandsfossen
- Location: Vestland, Norway
- Coordinates: 59.9461°N 6.58173°E
- Type: Tiered Plunges
- Elevation: 274 metres (899 ft)
- Total height: 84 metres (276 ft)
- Number of drops: 2
- Longest drop: 55 metres (180 ft)
- Average width: 15 metres (49 ft)
- Run: 46 metres (151 ft)
- Watercourse: Espelandselva
- Average flow rate: 4 m^{3}/s (140 cu ft/s)

The Espelandsfossen is a waterfall located in the Oddadalen valley in Ullensvang Municipality in Vestland county, Norway. This waterfall has a height of 84 metres (276 ft), with a total of 2 drops, with an average waterflow of 4 cubic metres per second (140 cu ft/s). The waterfall lies about 2 kilometres (1.2 mi) north of the village of Skare and about 15 kilometres (9.3 mi) south of the town of Odda.

It is one of two waterfalls in Norway that shares the same name (the other one is in nearby Voss Municipality).

== See also ==
- List of waterfalls#Norway
