= Tyssestrengene =

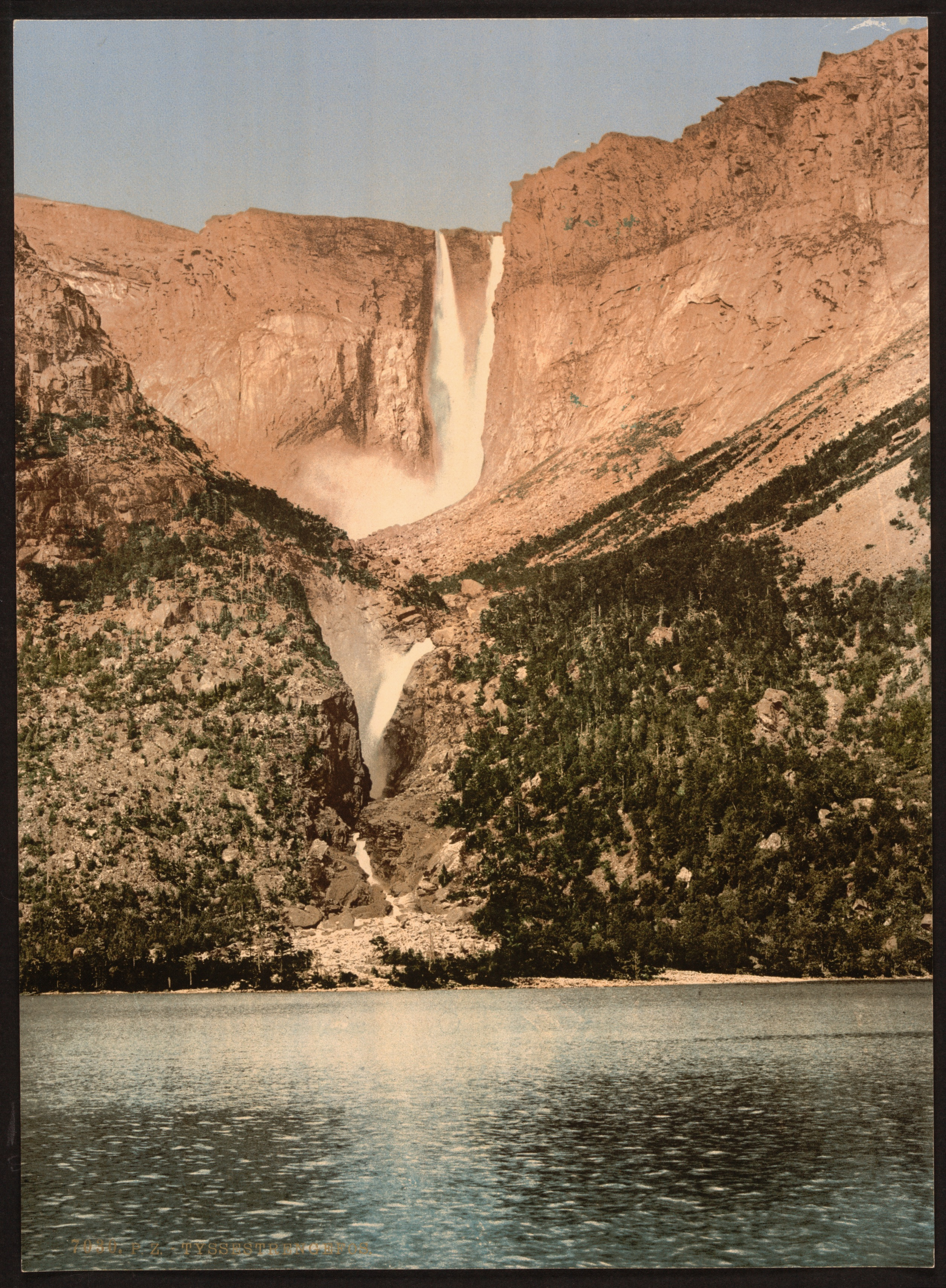
- Historic view of the falls in 1905, before water flow was diminished for a hydroelectric project
- Interactive map of Tyssestrengene
- Location: Vestland, Norway
- Coordinates: 60.136910°N 6.753161°E
- Type: Tiered Plunges
- Elevation: 1,143 metres (3,750 ft)
- Total height: 646 metres (2,119 ft)
- Number of drops: 3
- Longest drop: 312 metres (1,024 ft)
- Total width: 15 metres (49 ft)
- Average width: 30 metres (98 ft)
- Run: 1,585 metres (5,200 ft)
- Watercourse: Tysso
- Average flow rate: 0 m^{3}/s (0 cu ft/s)

Tyssestrengene are waterfalls east of the village of Tyssedal in Ullensvang Municipality, in Vestland county, Norway. The waterfalls are fed by the Tysso River before flowing down into the lake Ringedalsvatnet. The Trolltunga cliff is located near the waterfalls.

The total drop is 646 metres (2,119 ft), while the tallest single drop is 312 metres (1,024 ft). Following their incorporation in the Norwegian Hydroelectric Power Authority, their water flow is diminished to such a point that only after heavy snow melts is there any flow of substance. Most of the year there is no water flowing. However, they are amongst the highest waterfalls in the world and, according to Statistics Norway, the tallest single drop in Norway.

== See also ==
- List of waterfalls
