= Seljestad, Vestland =

Village in Ullensvang Municipality, Norway

Seljestad
- Village
- Interactive map of Seljestad
- Coordinates: 59.9°N 6.65°E
- Country: Norway
- Region: Western Norway
- County: Vestland
- District: Hardanger
- Municipality: Ullensvang Municipality
- Elevation: 594 m (1,949 ft)
- Time zone: UTC+01:00 (CET)
  - Summer (DST): UTC+02:00 (CEST)
- Post Code: 5763 Skare

Seljestad is a village in Ullensvang Municipality in Vestland county, Norway. The village is located at an elevation of 600 metres (2,000 ft) above sea level, in the Seljestaddalen valley, about 25 kilometres (16 mi) south of the town of Odda. The European route E134 highway passes through the village. There were about 29 permanent residents of Seljestad in 2001, but the area has a lot of vacation cabins and the Seljestad hotel in the area, so there can be a large temporary population at certain times of the year.
