= Røldal Stave Church =

Church in Vestland, Norway

- Røldal stavkyrkje
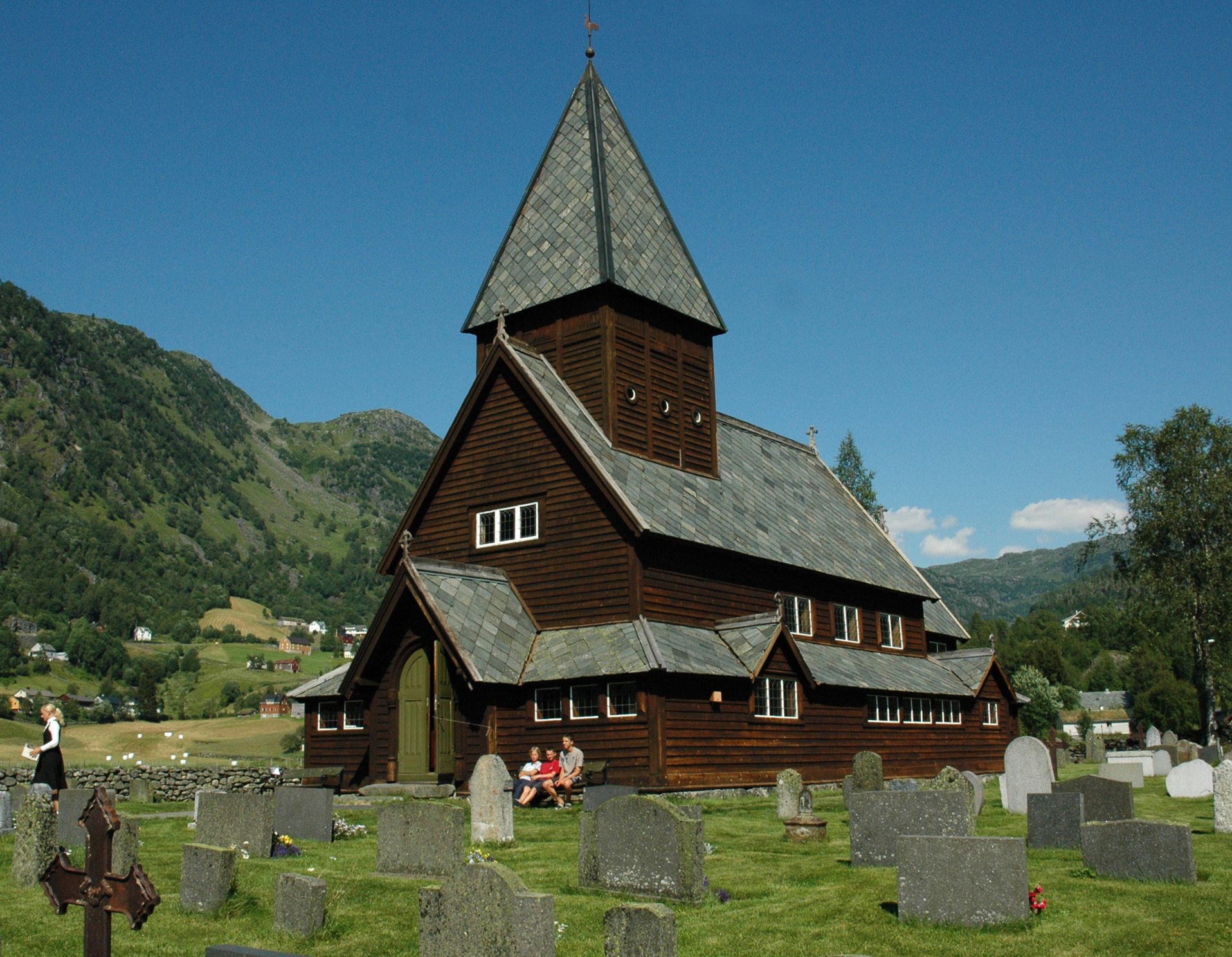
- View of the church
- Røldal Stave Church
- 59°49′51″N 6°49′22″E
- Location: Ullensvang, Vestland
- Country: Norway
- Denomination: Church of Norway
- Previous denomination: Catholic Church
- Churchmanship: Evangelical Lutheran

History
- Status: Parish church
- Founded: c. 1250
- Consecrated: c. 1250

Architecture
- Functional status: Active
- Architectural type: Long church
- Completed: c. 1250 (776 years ago)

Specifications
- Capacity: 130
- Materials: Wood

Administration
- Diocese: Bjørgvin bispedømme
- Deanery: Hardanger og Voss prosti
- Parish: Røldal
- Norwegian Cultural Heritage Site
- Type: Church
- Status: Automatically protected
- ID: 85335

Røldal Stave Church (Norwegian: Røldal stavkyrkje) is a parish church of the Church of Norway in Ullensvang Municipality in Vestland county, Norway. It is located in the village of Røldal. It is the church for the Røldal parish, part of the Hardanger og Voss prosti (deanery) in the Diocese of Bjørgvin. The brown, wooden stave church was built around 1250 using designs by an unknown architect. The church seats about 130 people and is built in a long church design. The church is a preserved historic museum, but it is still a regularly-used parish church that holds regularly scheduled worship services twice a month.

== History ==
The estimated construction date of the church is generally thought to be between 1200 and 1250. A soapstone baptismal font in the church is dated to the same period. A crucifix in the church dates from about 1250. The church has a rectangular-shaped nave and chancel. The Bergen Museum holds a variety of building components and other artifacts from the medieval church. These include altar frontal and wooden sculptures of St. Olaf from about 1250, of the Virgin Mary with child from about 1250, and the Archangel Michael, dated about 1200. In the Middle Ages, Røldal Church received large donations from many pilgrims who flocked to the church. As a result, the small village where the church is located became quite prosperous. In the 17th century, the walls inside the church were richly decorated with paintings. The altarpiece dates to 1629. It was the design of German-born painter Gottfried Hendtzschel from Breslau in Silesia.

In the 1840s, the nave was enlarged by adding on to the building to the west. During this reconstruction of the church in 1844, some of the history of the church was uncovered. This led to an investigation to determine how the church was built. The resulting belief is that Røldal Stave Church differed from other stave churches. Some controversy developed about whether this is a stave church or an example of the assumed predecessor type, a post church.

From 1913 to 1918, the church underwent an extensive renovation and restoration. Paneling from the 19th century was removed, and the Renaissance interior was restored. A new second-floor seating gallery was also built around the church to protect the wall tables. The church reconstruction was led by Norwegian architect Jens Zetlitz Monrad Kielland (1866–1926), and the color restoration was performed by Norwegian painter Domenico Erdmann (1879–1940), who was assisted by Norwegian painter Alfred Obert Hagn (1882–1958) and Danish-Norwegian artist Ulrik Hendriksen (1891–1960).

== Media gallery ==
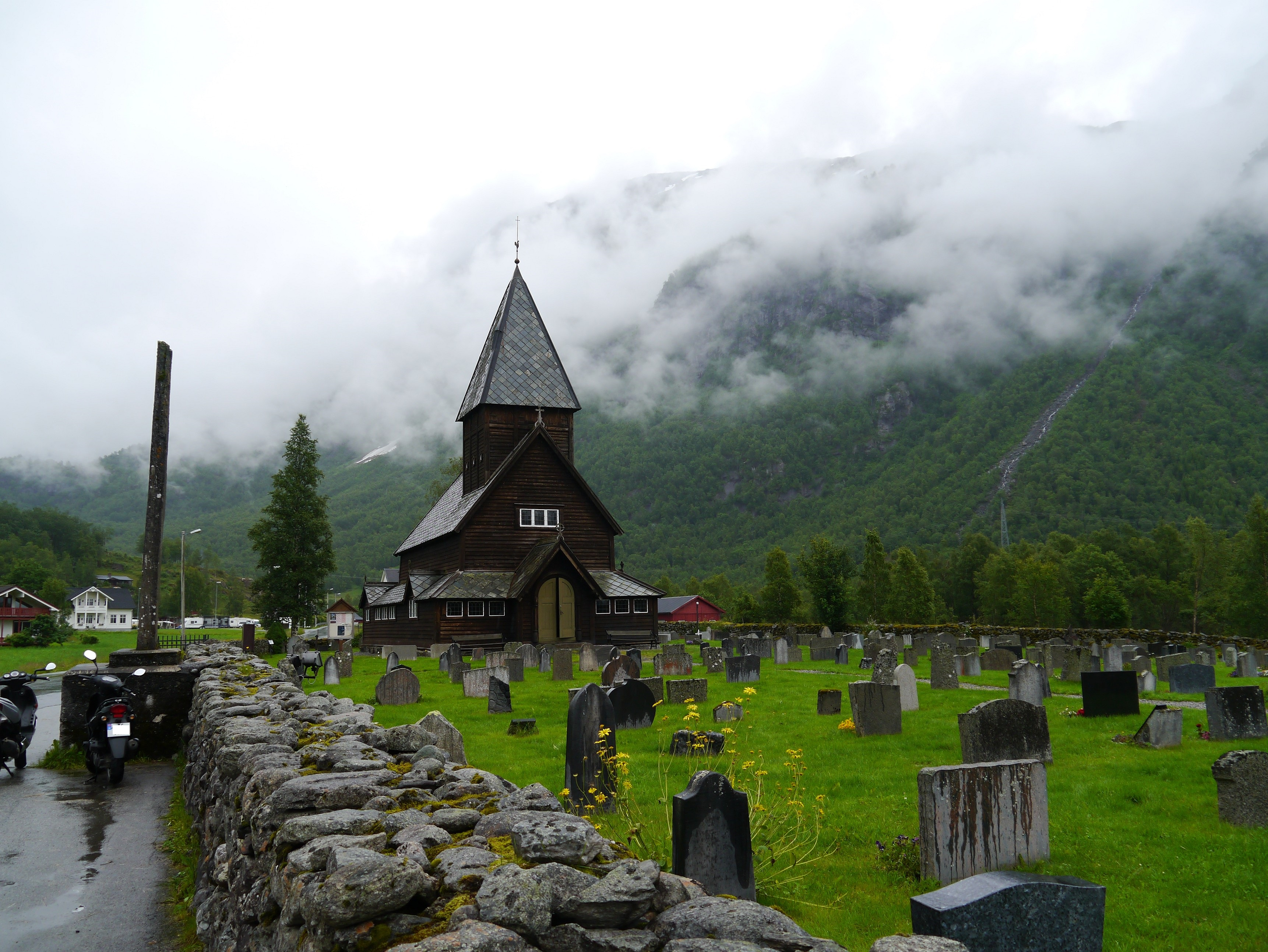
View of the church and graveyard

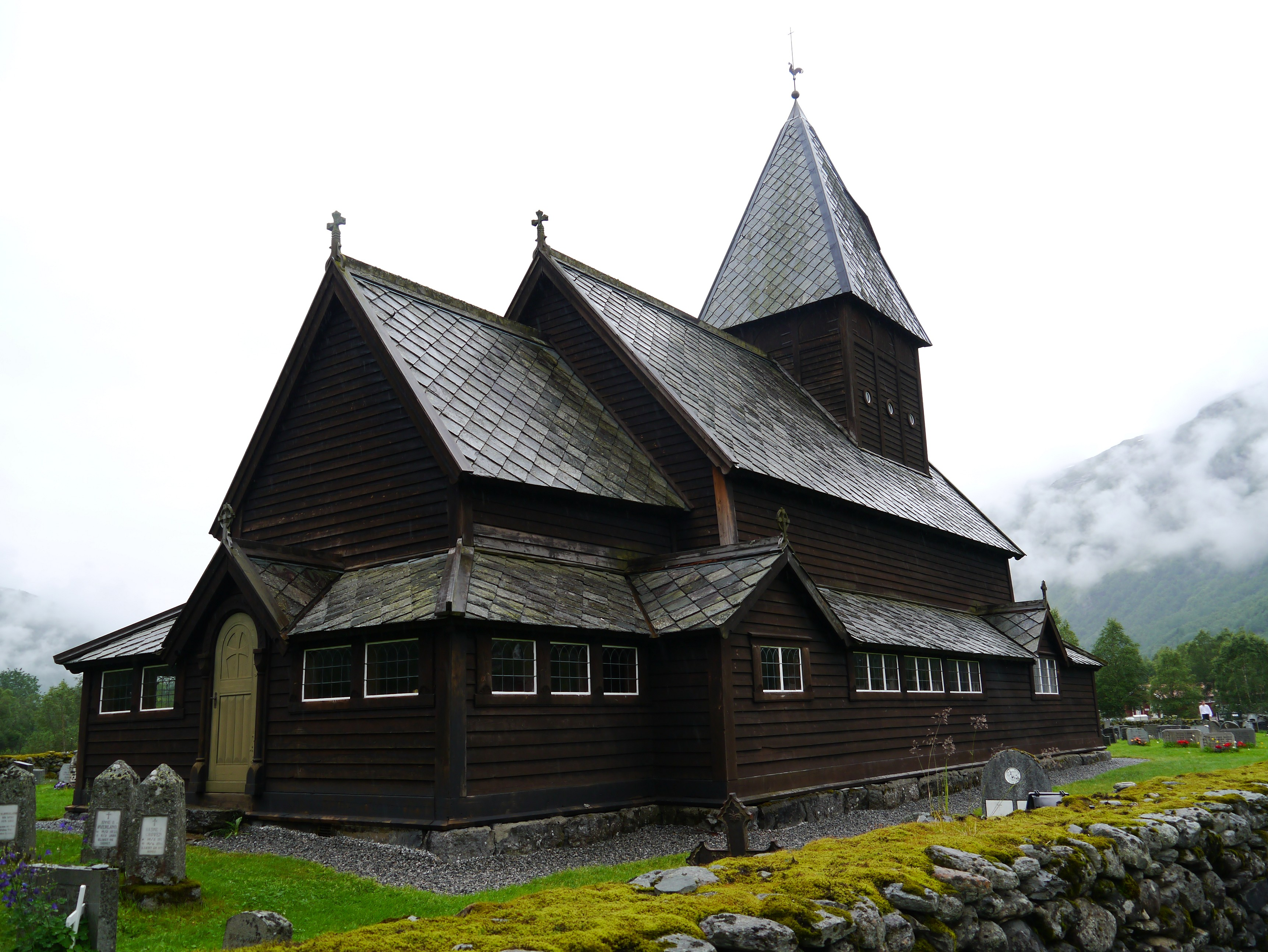
Rear view of the church

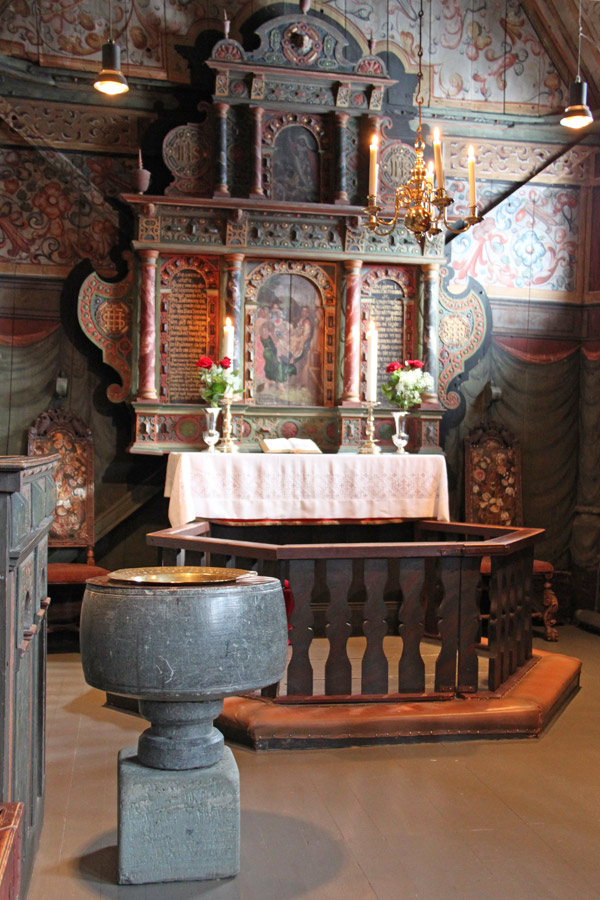
Altar in Røldal church

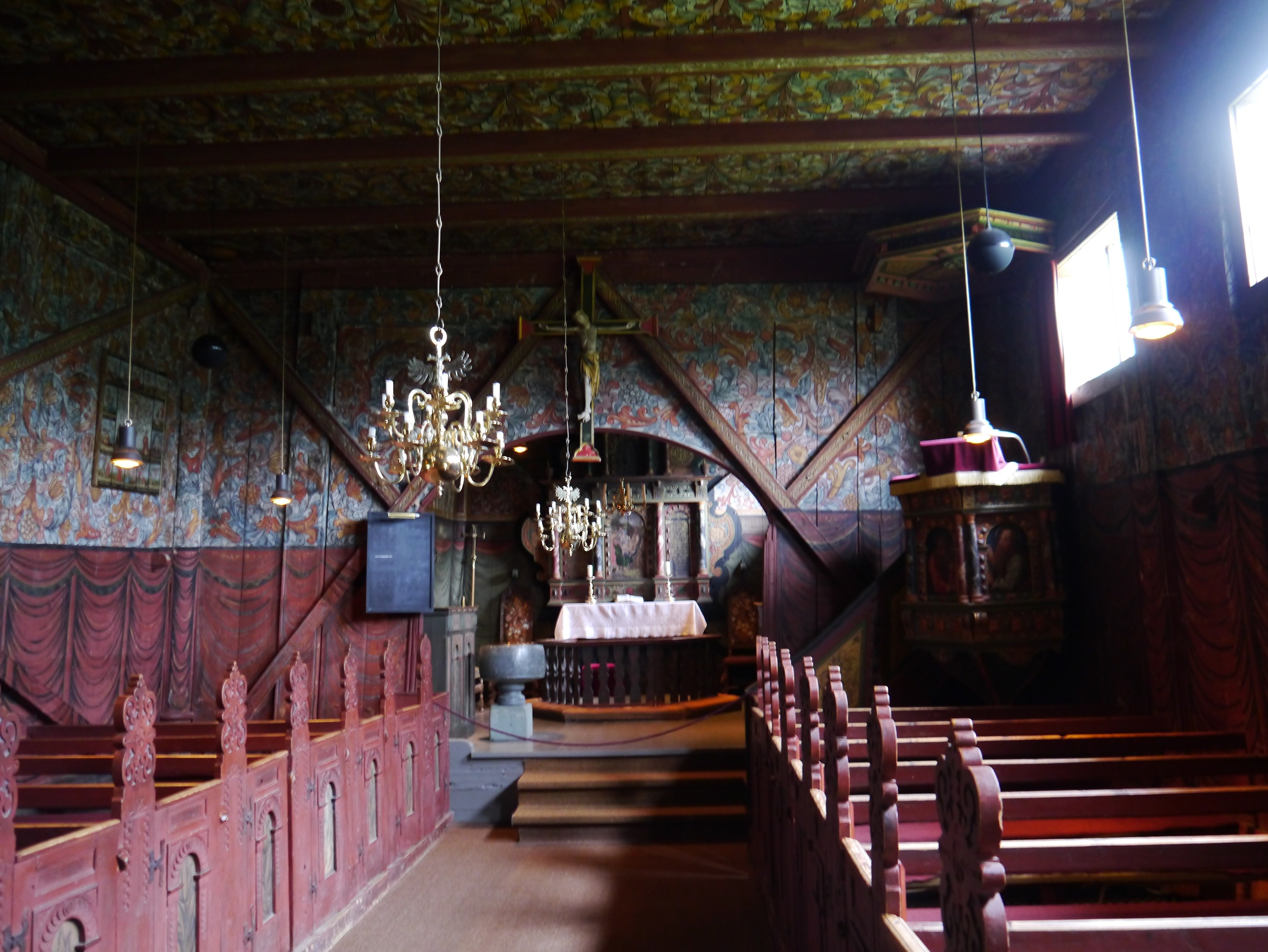
Front interior view of the church

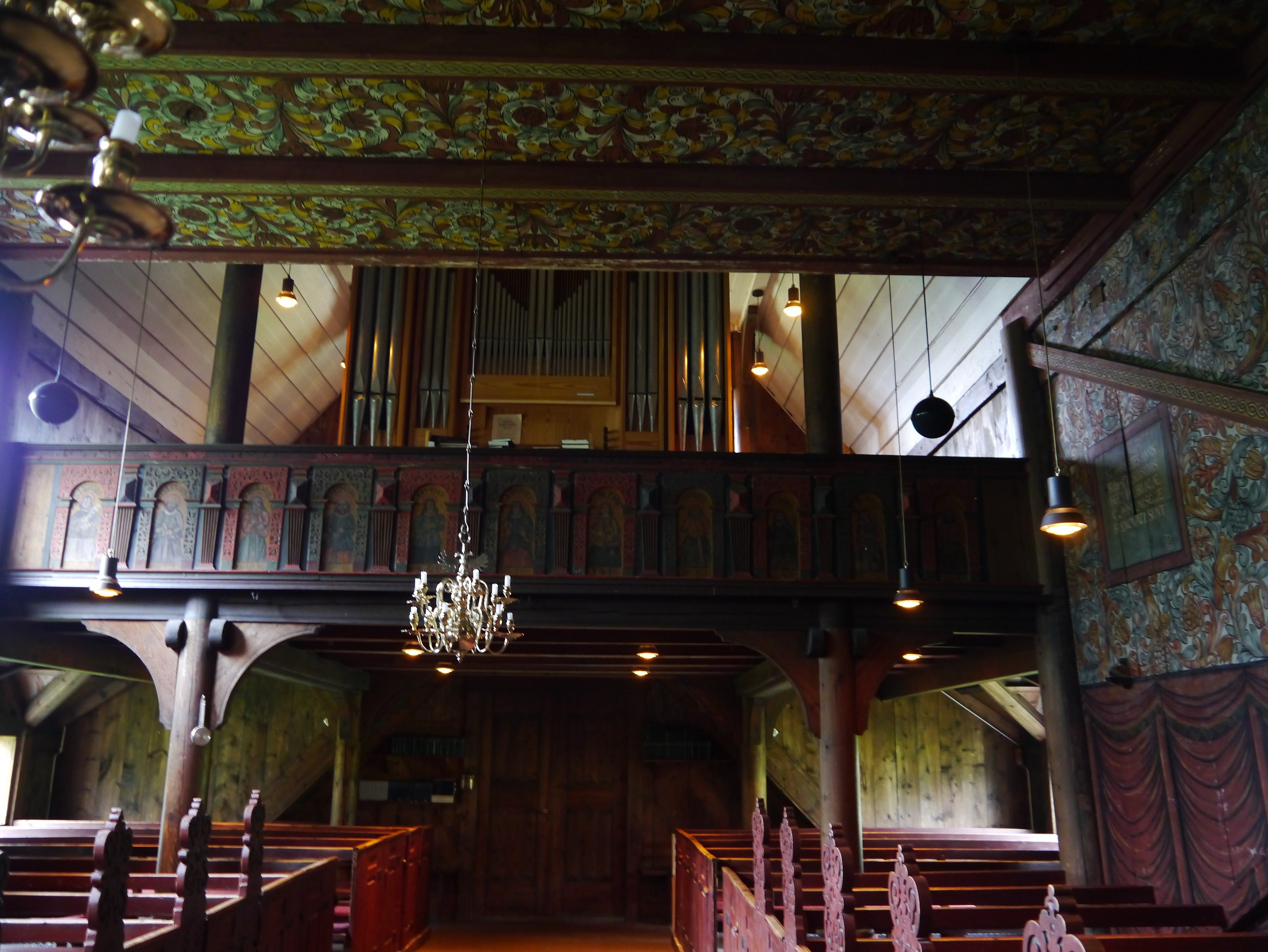
Back interior view of the church

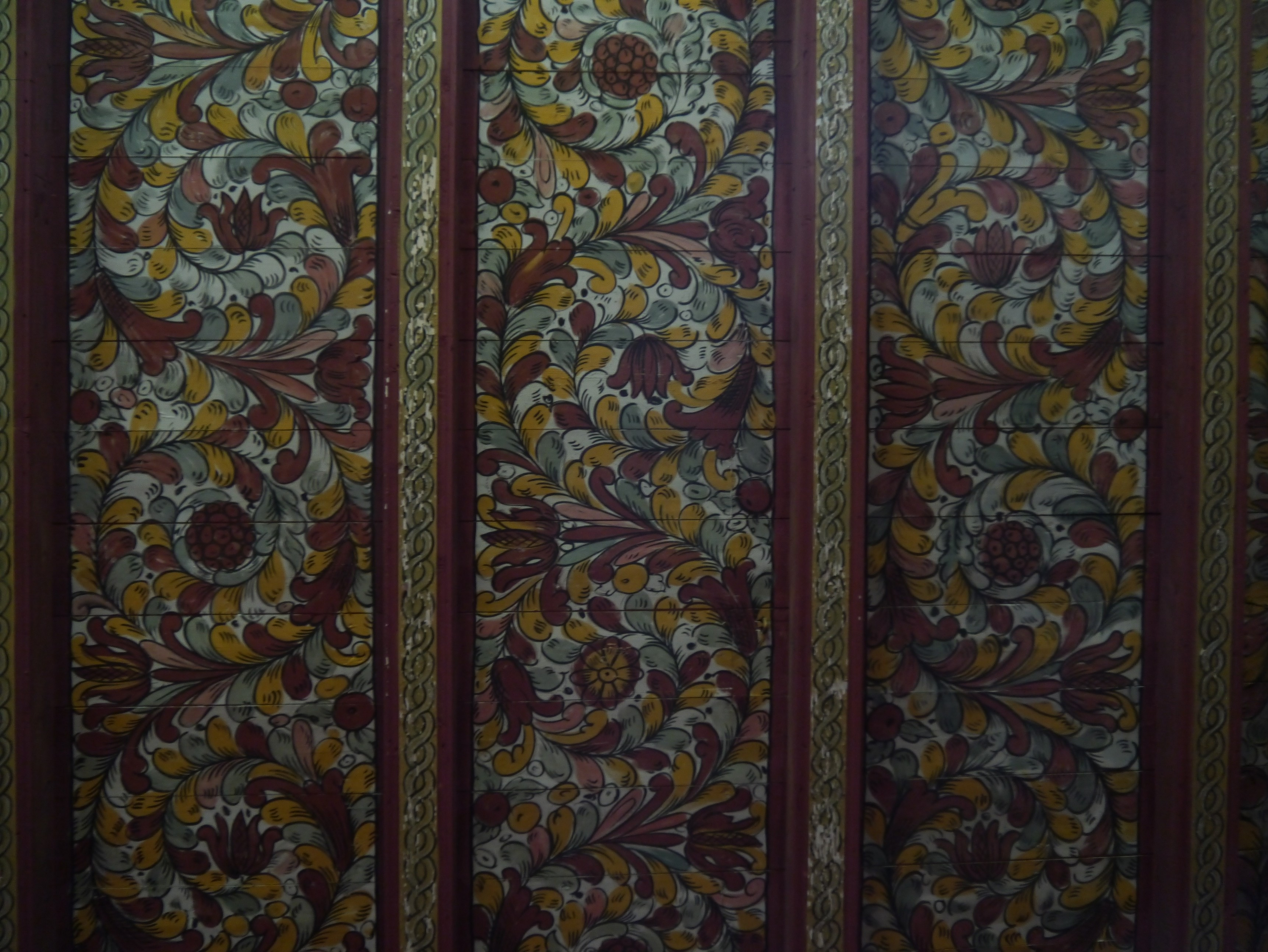
Interior ceiling of the church

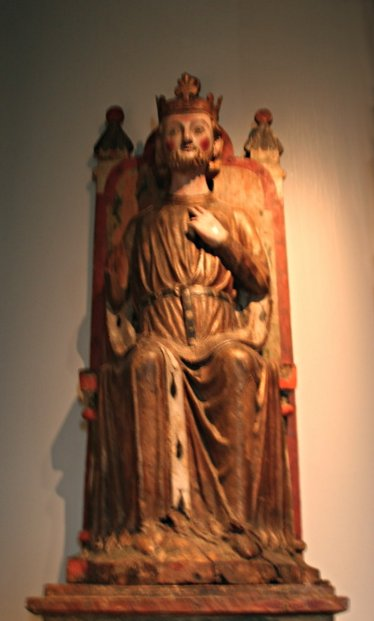
Statue of St Olav

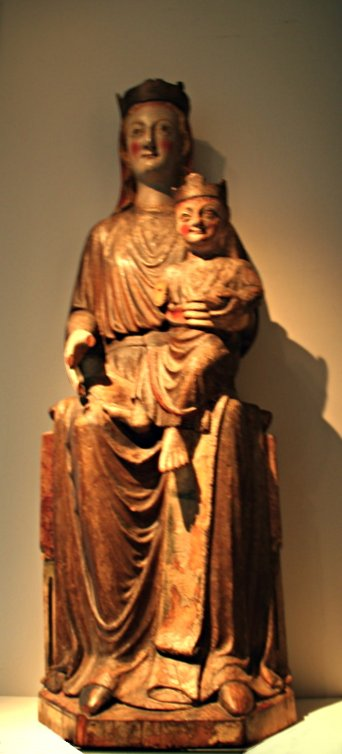
Statue of Madonna and child

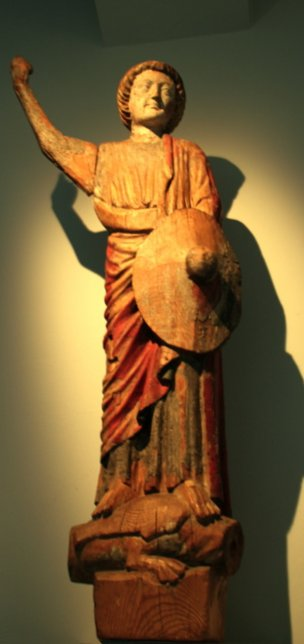
Statue of Archangel Michael

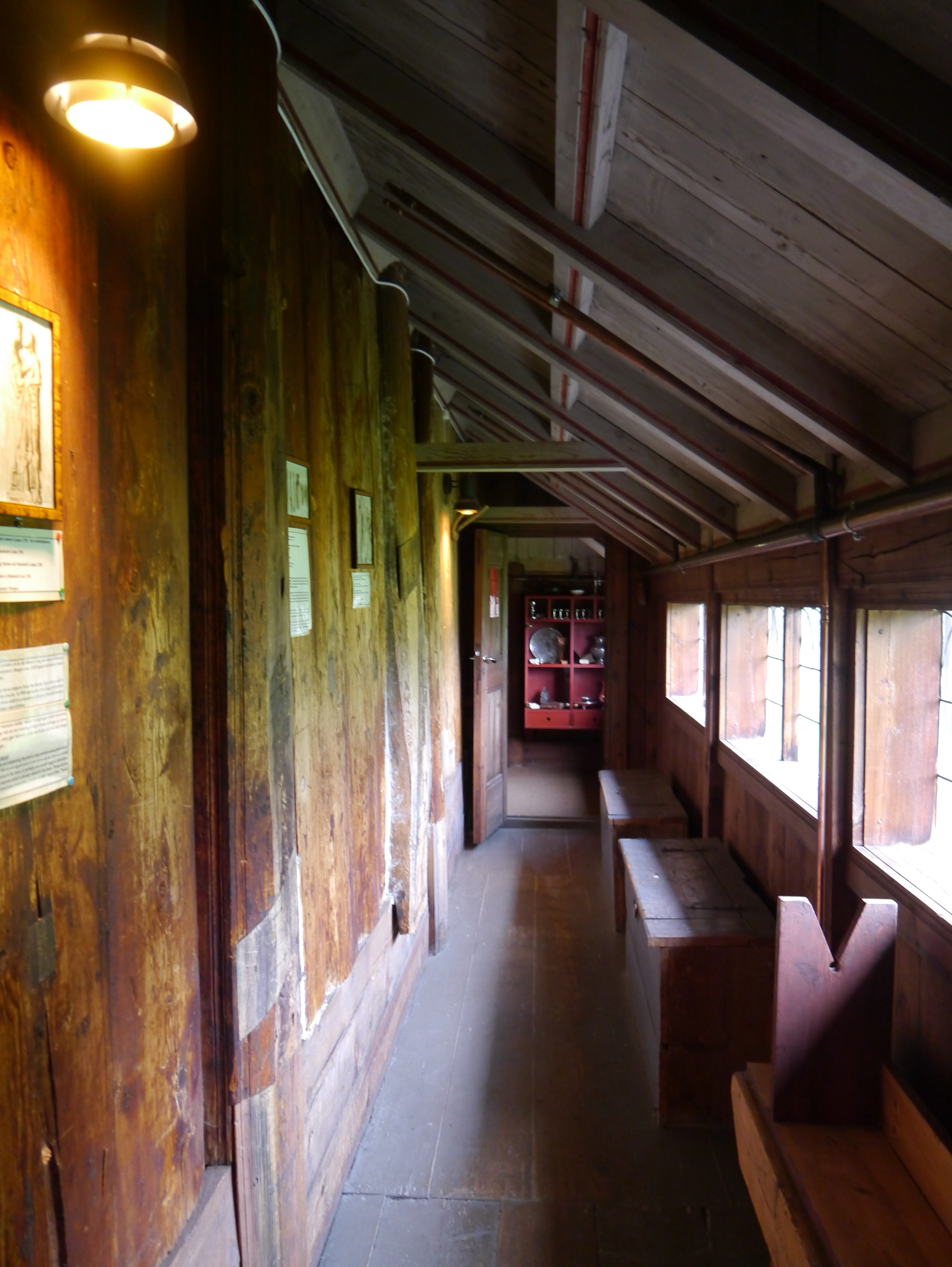
Side arcade of the church

== See also ==
- List of churches in Bjørgvin
