= Mågelibanen =

Funicular railway in Vestland, Norway

Coordinates: 60°8′0.95280″N 6°37′35.609″E

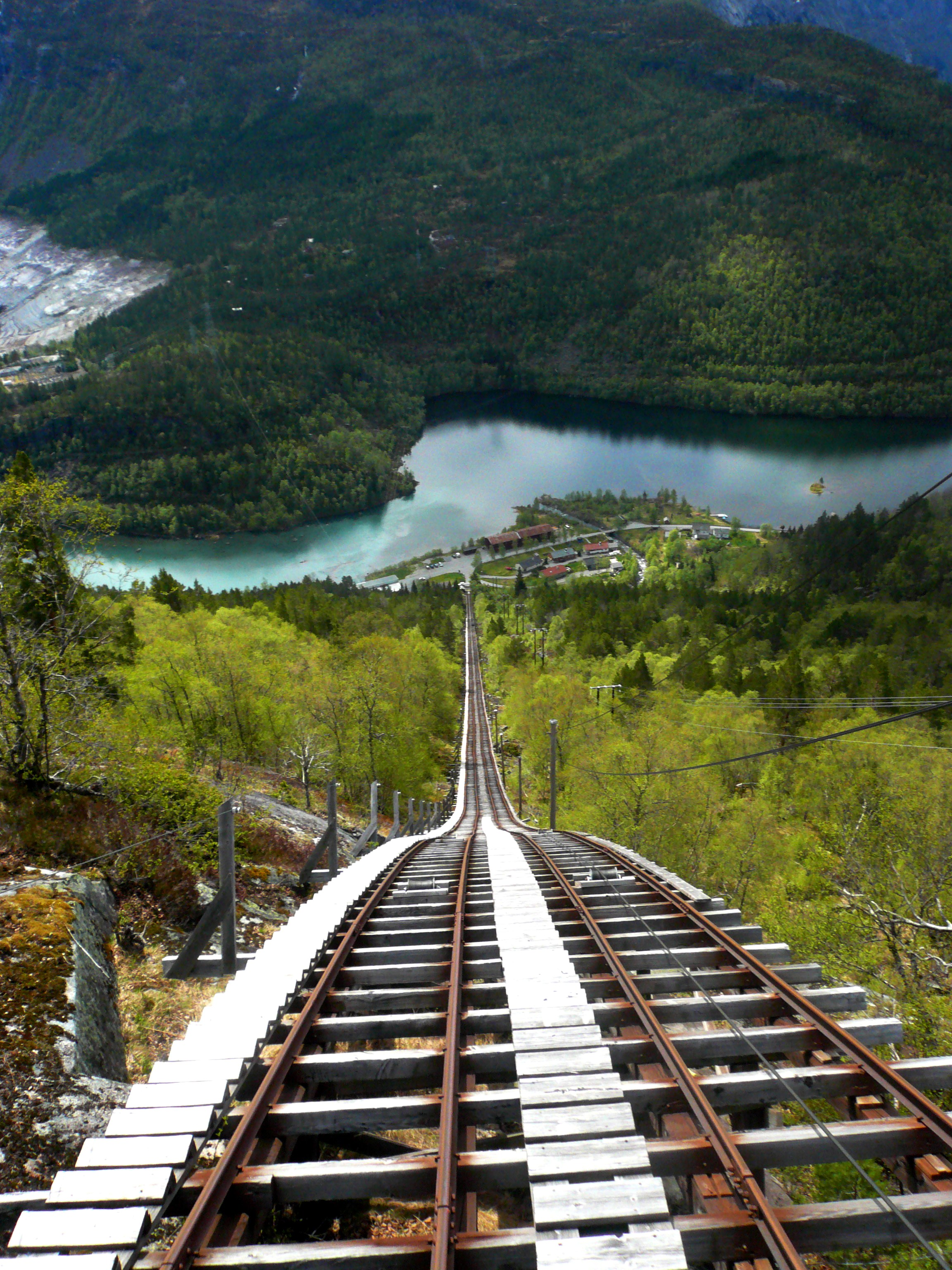
Mågelibanen was built 1911-1912 for transportation of workers and equipment to the mountains in connection to the building of a 600-meter (1,969 ft) long transfer tunnel between the lakes Øvre and Nedre Bersåvatnet

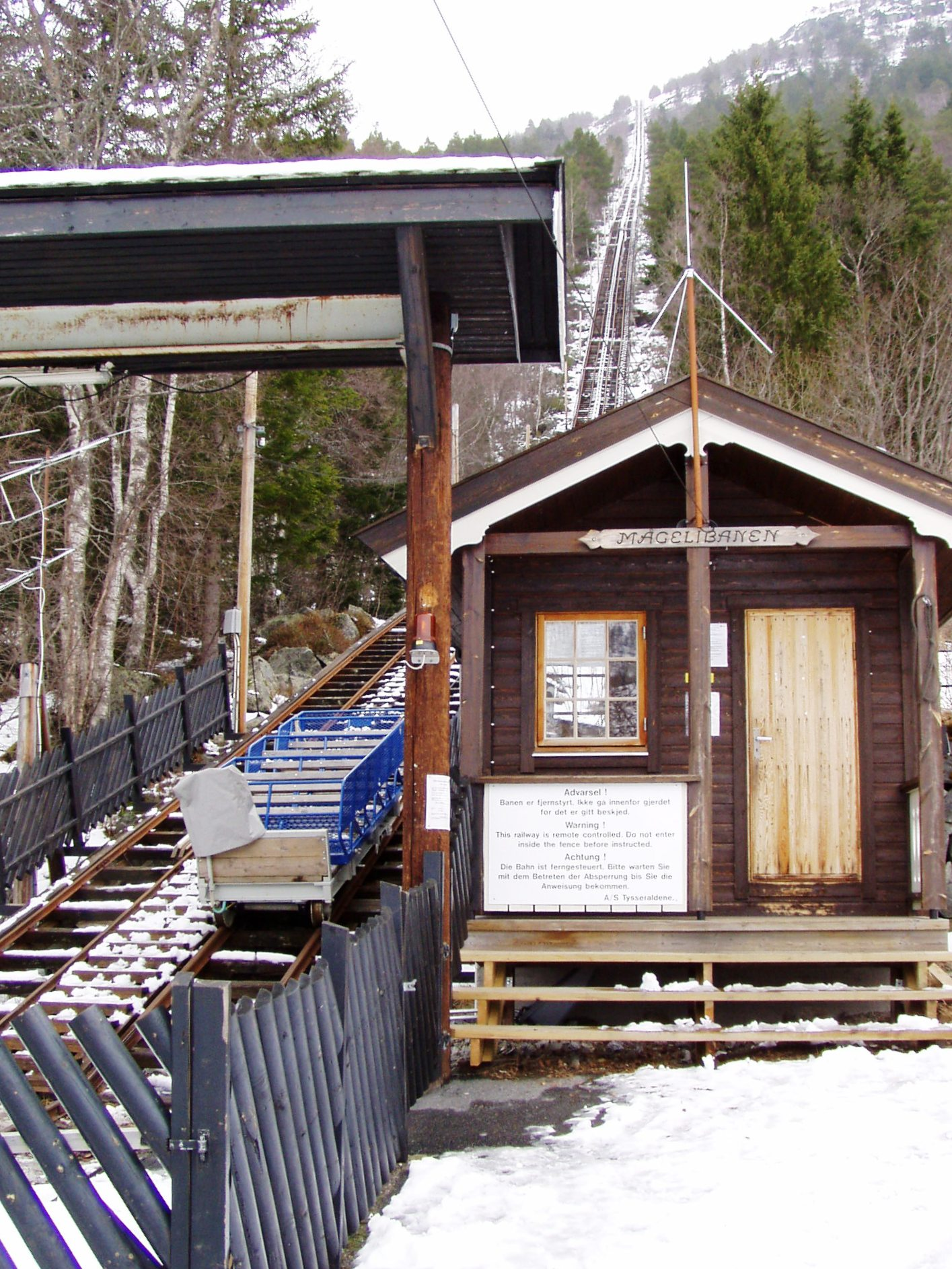
Mågelibanen. Photo: Svein Harkestad

Mågelibanen was a funicular with double track line arranged on a timber trestle work at Skjeggedal in Ullensvang Municipality in Vestland county, Norway. From the station close to the Ringedals Dam and the lake Vetlavatn, the funicular ascended 430 meters (1,411 ft) to the top station Mågelitopp, 860 meters (2,822 ft) above sea level. The Mågelibanen was part of an industrial landscape connected to the listed hydroelectric power station in Tyssedal and the industry in the nearby town of Odda.

== History ==
Mågelibanen was built 1911-1912 by AS Tyssefaldene for transportation of workers and equipment to the mountains in connection with the building of a 600-meter (1,969 ft) long transfer tunnel between the lakes Øvre and Nedre Bersåvatnet in the Tyssedalsfjellene mountains. The funicular was later used for supervision and maintenance of mountain installations. The funicular has also been used for new hydroelectric constructions in the area.

=== Upgrading ===
In connection to the 50th anniversary of AS Tyssefaldene in 1956 the funicular was upgraded and given as gift from the company to the people of Tyssedal. When the funicular opened, it made the spectacular rock formation Trolltunga and the attractive mountain plateau of Hardangervidda accessible to the public.

=== Recent history ===
The funicular was modernized in 1988. From the late 1990s to the beginning of the 2000s the funicular was also used for tourist transportation. A road to Mågelitopp was planned which conflicted with the track line of Mågelibanen. The transportation license ended in 2010 and the funicular closed permanently. The middle section of track has been removed and the remainder is in a poor state of repair. The road consists of a series of switchbacks, several of which cross the former location of the rails.

== Technical data ==
- Track length: 960 meters (3,150 ft)
- Height: 430 meters (1,411 ft)
- Horizontal length: 814 meters (2,671 ft)
- Maximum steepness: 42°
- Configuration: Two parallel straight tracks
- Journey time: 12 minutes
- Speed: 1.5 m/s (4.9 ft/s)
- Cars: 2
- Car weight: 760 kg (1,676 lb)
- Capacity: 9 passengers or 1,200 kg (2,646 lb) per car
- Track gauge: 800 mm (2 ft 7 1/2 in)
- Traction: Electricity

== See also ==
- List of funicular railways
