= Trolltunga =

Rock formation in Norway

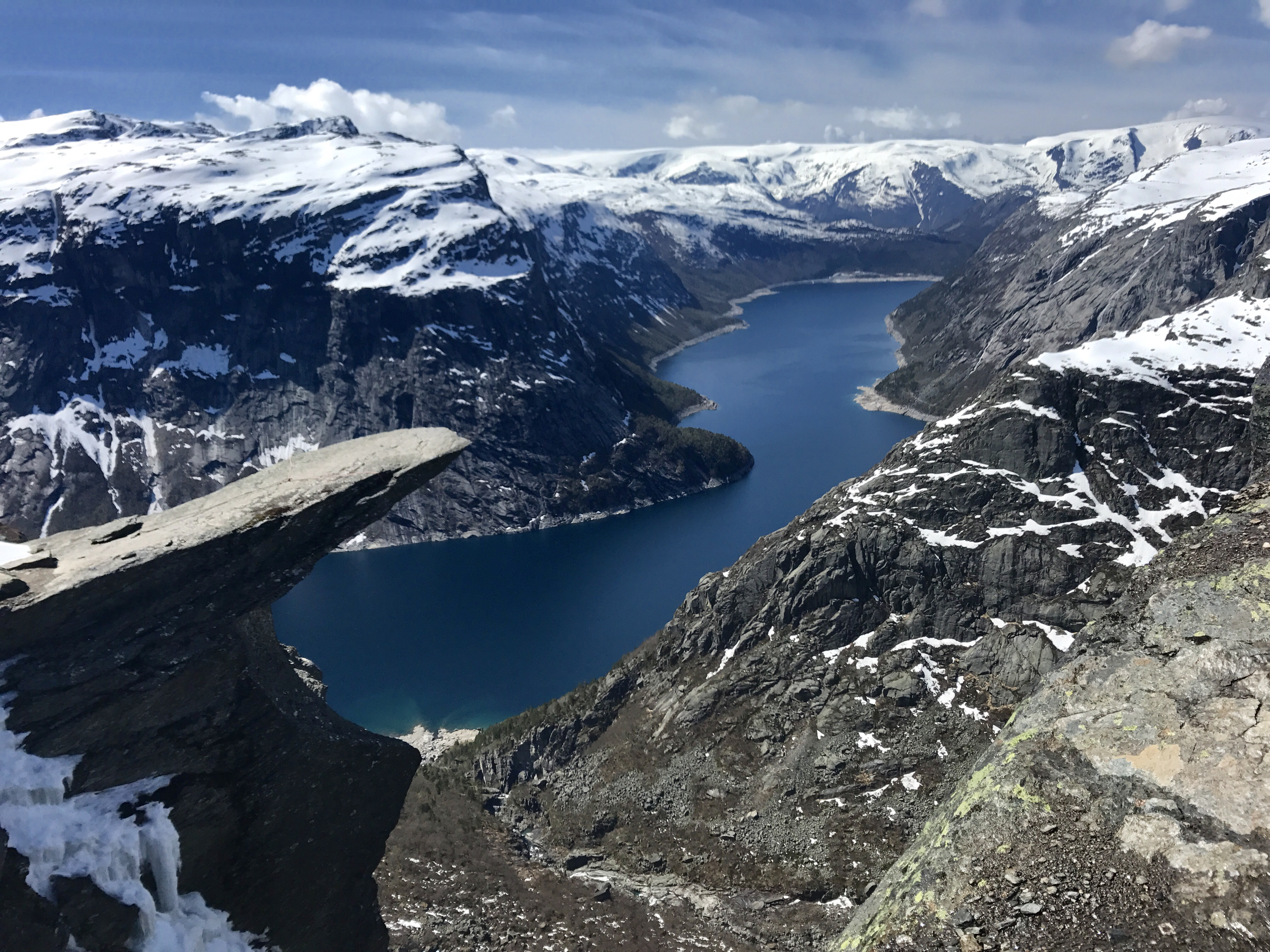
- The view of Trolltunga and Ringedalsvatnet with glimpses of the Folgefonna glacier in the background.

Highest point
- Elevation: 1,126 m (3,694 ft)
- Coordinates: 60°07′59″N 6°45′17″E

Geography
- Location: Vestland, Norway
- Topo map: Hardangervidda Vest (2010)

Geology
- Mountain type: Granite penetrated by glacial erosion

Climbing
- Easiest route: Challenging

Trolltunga (lit. 'the troll tongue') is a rock formation situated at an elevaton of 1,126 metres (3,694 ft) above sea level in Ullensvang Municipality in Vestland county, Norway. The cliff juts horizontally out from the mountain, about 700 metres (2,300 ft) above the north side of the lake Ringedalsvatnet.

Popularity of the hike to Trolltunga and rock formation itself has exploded in recent years. The increased popularity has turned Trolltunga into a national icon and a major tourist attraction for the region. Until 2010, fewer than 800 people hiked to Trolltunga each year. In 2016, more than an estimated 80,000 people hiked the 27-kilometre (17 mi) round-trip from the village of Skjeggedal, making it one of Norway's most popular hikes.

This is a very challenging hike, at least 10 hours on rough terrain. There are no shelters on the hike route and no places to buy supplies. However, there is a plan to build a lodge roughly halfway where hikers can rest. There are two emergency cabins along the trail.

== Geology ==
The cliff is part of the Precambrian bedrock and was formed during the last Ice Age, approximately 10,000 years ago, when the edges of the glacier reached the cliff. The water from the glacier froze in the crevices of the mountain and eventually broke off large, angular blocks, which were later carried away with the glacier. Along the cliff itself, a gneiss, there continues to be deep cracks. The trail to Trolltunga also passes through the bedrock and washed slippery hillsides in the background also containing gneiss.

== Access ==
Trolltunga is located 17 kilometres (11 mi) from the town of Odda. The city of Bergen, is about 190 kilometres (120 mi) from the site via main roads.

The trailhead is located by a small parking area with toilet facilities at Skjeggedal, about 7 kilometres (4.3 mi) from Norwegian National Road 13 in Tyssedalen, near the dam at the end of Ringedalsvatnet. Parking at Skjeggedal costs 500 kr per day for the lower car park (approximately US$62 or €52).

The hike from the parking area to Trolltunga and back again is a 27-kilometre (17 mi) round-trip distance with a 1,100-metre (3,600 ft) gain in elevation, and it takes approximately 10–12 hours, including breaks.

=== Hiking trail ===
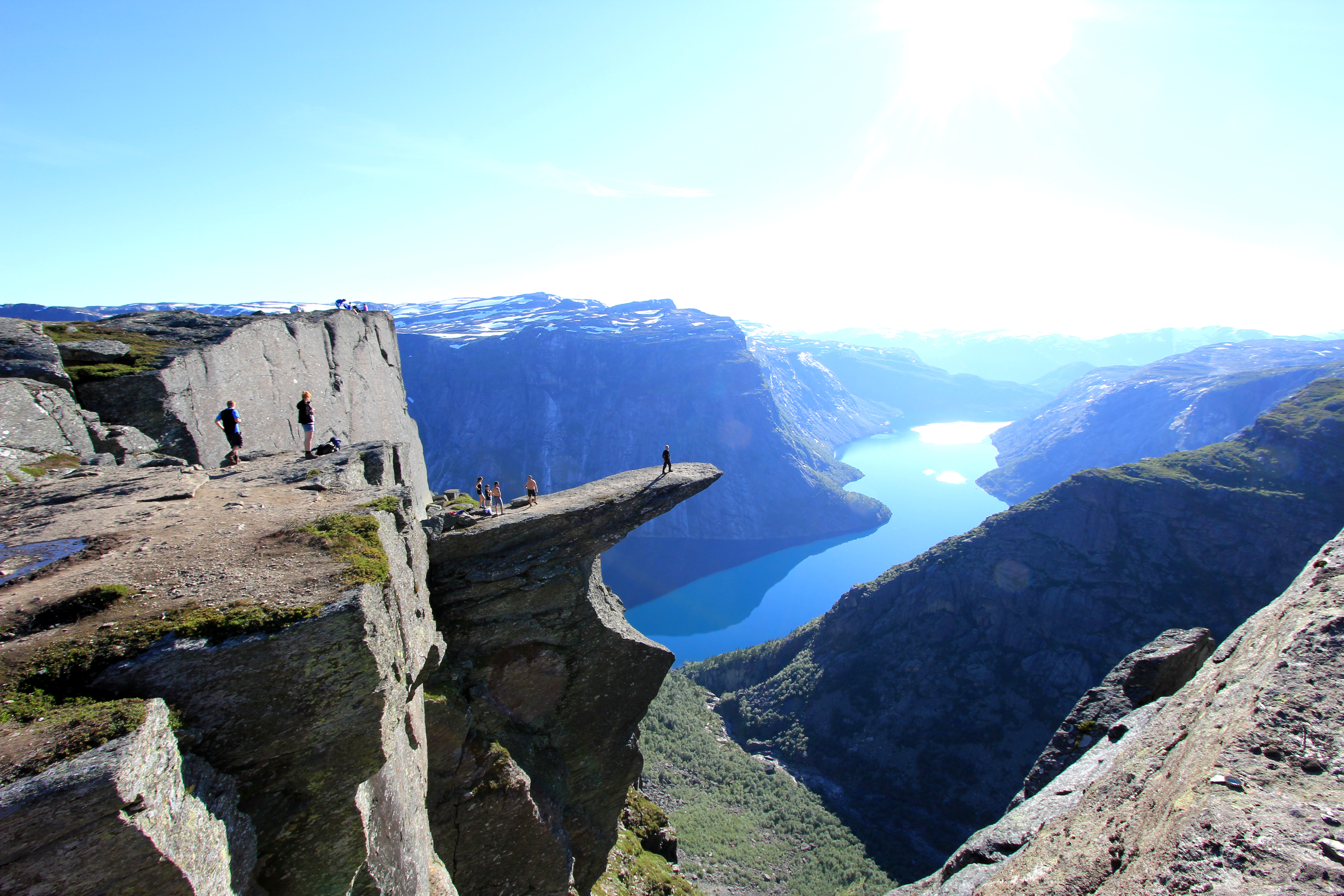
Trolltunga cliff

Near the parking area at Skjeggedal there is a funicular called Mågelibanen (it is not in operation). The trail to Trolltunga begins here, on the left side of the funicular. It is marked with red Ts painted in the terrain, and signs along the route that marks the distance left to Trolltunga and to the starting point at Skjeggedal.

For the first 1.5 kilometres (0.93 mi), up to the Måglitopp, the trail rises about 450 metres (1,480 ft). From here the track surfaces slightly out before it gets steep again, rising another 330 metres (1,080 ft) up from Gryteskaret to Trombåskåret. This section is the steepest part on this hike. But in recent years this section has been improved by Nepalese sherpas, making it easier to traverse.

After this 4-kilometre (2.5 mi) steep climb from the parking area, the next section slopes down towards Store Floren. The trail continues over Hesteflåene and the dried out river Endåno, before it gets steeper up to Endanuten and crosses the dried river to Tyssestrengene. From here the trail goes on past glacial potholes, then continues past Tysshøl, and finally approaches Trolltunga, about 13.5 kilometres (8.4 mi) from the starting point at Skjeggedal.

=== Alternative starting point ===
In 2017, a new toll road up the steep hillside to Mågelitopp opened to the public. It allows vehicles to access the plateau at Måglitopp. It does not require a 4x4 vehicle. Due to limited parking the maximum capacity here is 30 cars per day. The road opens each day during the season at 6:00 AM, and closes when the first 30 cars have entered the gate. Online reservations are possible and parking here costs 600 kr. The road is also open to hikers, as an alternative to the regular starting point at Skjeggedal.

There is a shuttle bus that carries hikers from Skjeggedal to Målelitopp. The price is 130 kr for adults.

== Terrain ==
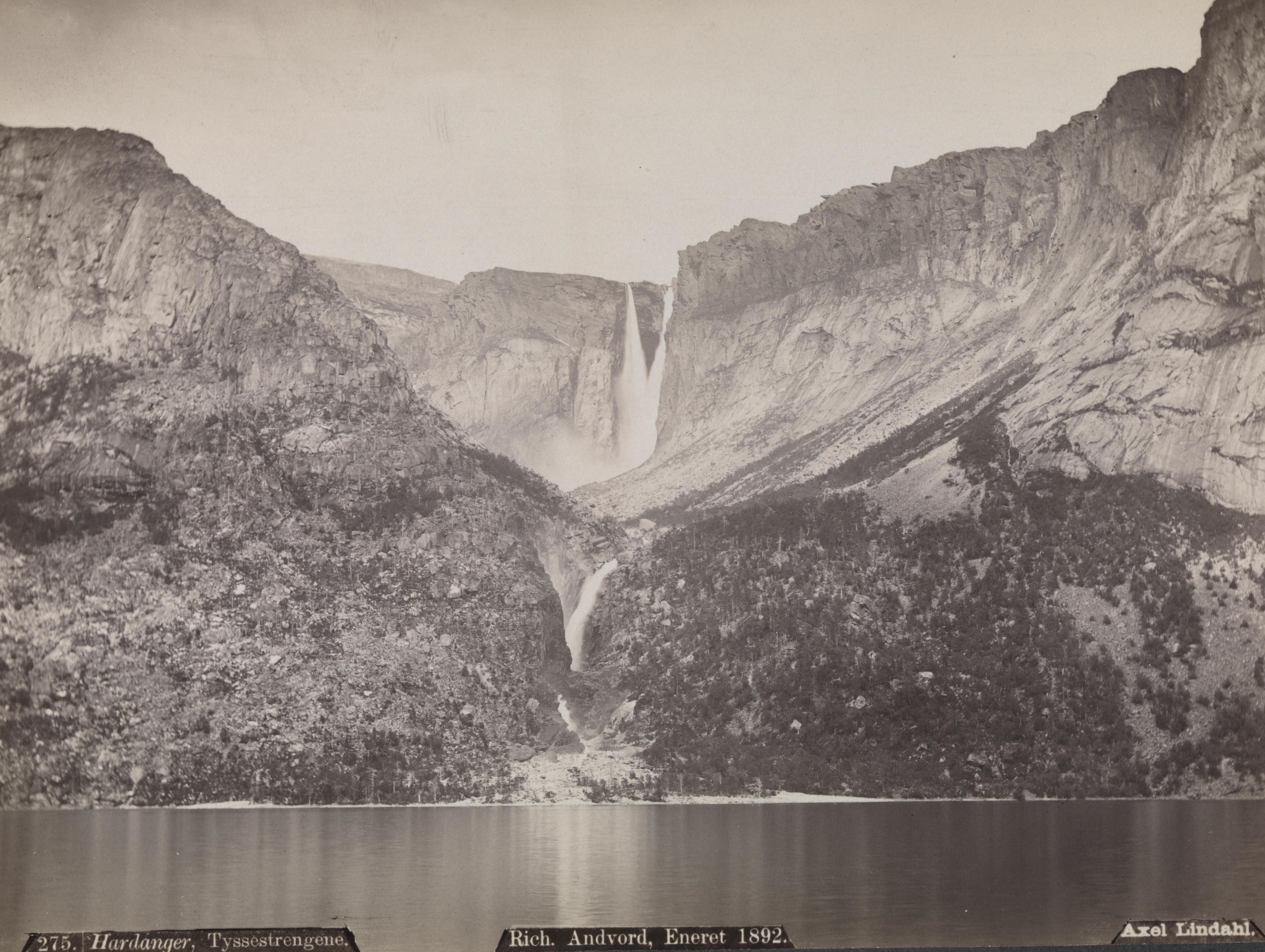
Trolltunga sits at the edge to right of Tyssestrengene waterfall (as seen from the lake below). Photo by Axel Lindahl around 1890 before the waterfall was diverted to power production.

The route to Trolltunga goes through high mountain terrain with creeks, streams, boulders, mud puddles, marshes, and water at several spots on the hike.

From late-September to June the terrain is normally covered with ice and snow. After a hard winter there can be snow at Trolltunga even during the summer season.

== Seasons and climate ==
Trolltunga is accessible for experienced hikers and guided groups from mid-June to mid-September, depending on when the snow melts in the Spring. The season for guided trips with snowshoes or skis starts in March.

Trolltunga is located in a region with a mild and humid coastal climate. During summer and autumn the weather conditions often change quickly – from blue sky to wind, rain and dense fog. Check the weather forecast and ask locals about what kind of weather to expect before you go hiking.

Due to the long distance, hikers to Trolltunga need to start before 10:00 AM in the summer season to get home before it gets dark and cold. In September it is recommended to start 8:00 AM at latest, since it gets darker earlier in the evening.

== Degree of difficulty ==
The Norwegian Trekking Association classify the hike as "challenging", requiring good endurance as well as proper hiking boots and equipment.

== Safety ==
Thousands of tourists visit Trolltunga during the four summer months, a number which has greatly increased from 500 per year to 80,000 between 2009 and 2016. No safety railing has been constructed on the edge of the cliff so as not to harm the natural beauty of the cliff, although a few small metal hooks have been installed as footholds to climb down to the rock.

On 5 September 2015, a 24-year-old Australian woman fell to her death off Trolltunga. It is believed to be the first recorded death from a fall there.

There are widely publicised photos of people hanging off the cliff or doing a hand stand on it. Most often they are manipulated. The elite climber Magnus Midtbø suspended himself from Trolltunga wearing a safety harness, but a version where the rope was erased has been spread in media.

The approach to and retreat from Trolltunga is a demanding hike, and 10–12 hours are needed for the round trip. In later years there have been up to 40 rescue actions annually. Surprisingly not because of the dangerous cliff, but due to the demanding hike back to Tyssedal. People get lost in fog or get injured during the hike or do not have the endurance for such a demanding hike.

There are mountain guards that offer guidance to tourists on how to prepare and dress for the hike at Skjeggedal. They give advice and information, but are not able to actually prevent anyone from starting the hike. However, the number of rescue missions have drastically decreased after the addition of these mountain guards.

It is planned to build a lodge halfway between Trolltunga and Tyssedal, which will provide accommodation for hikers en route from Trolltunga.

== Surrounding landscape ==
The cliff overlooks the valleys of the Hardanger region. The mountains surrounding the cliff reach heights of up to 1500 meters. Some of the hilltops have plains which are interspersed with lakes. Patches of snow are present in some areas, even in the summer months. Due to heavy use by tourists, the trail to Trolltunga quickly turns to mud after a rain in the summer.

== In popular culture ==
- A movie song called "Amali thumali" from the 2011 film Tamil language movie Ko (film) features the lead couples dancing on the top of the troll tongue rock formation at Trolltunga.
- A music video was filmed for Kygo's 2024 album named Kygo. The video features a grand piano helilifted to the top of the troll tongue rock formation, the Norwegian DJ controlling a digital mixer, electronic keyboard, and several featured artists singing atop the tongue.
- In 2025, an online webseries called Presidential Wars uses the cliff of Trolltunga for its 1st episode, where Ukrainian president Volodymyr Zelenskyy fights and gets pushed of a cliff by North Korean dictator Kim Jong Un.

== Gallery ==
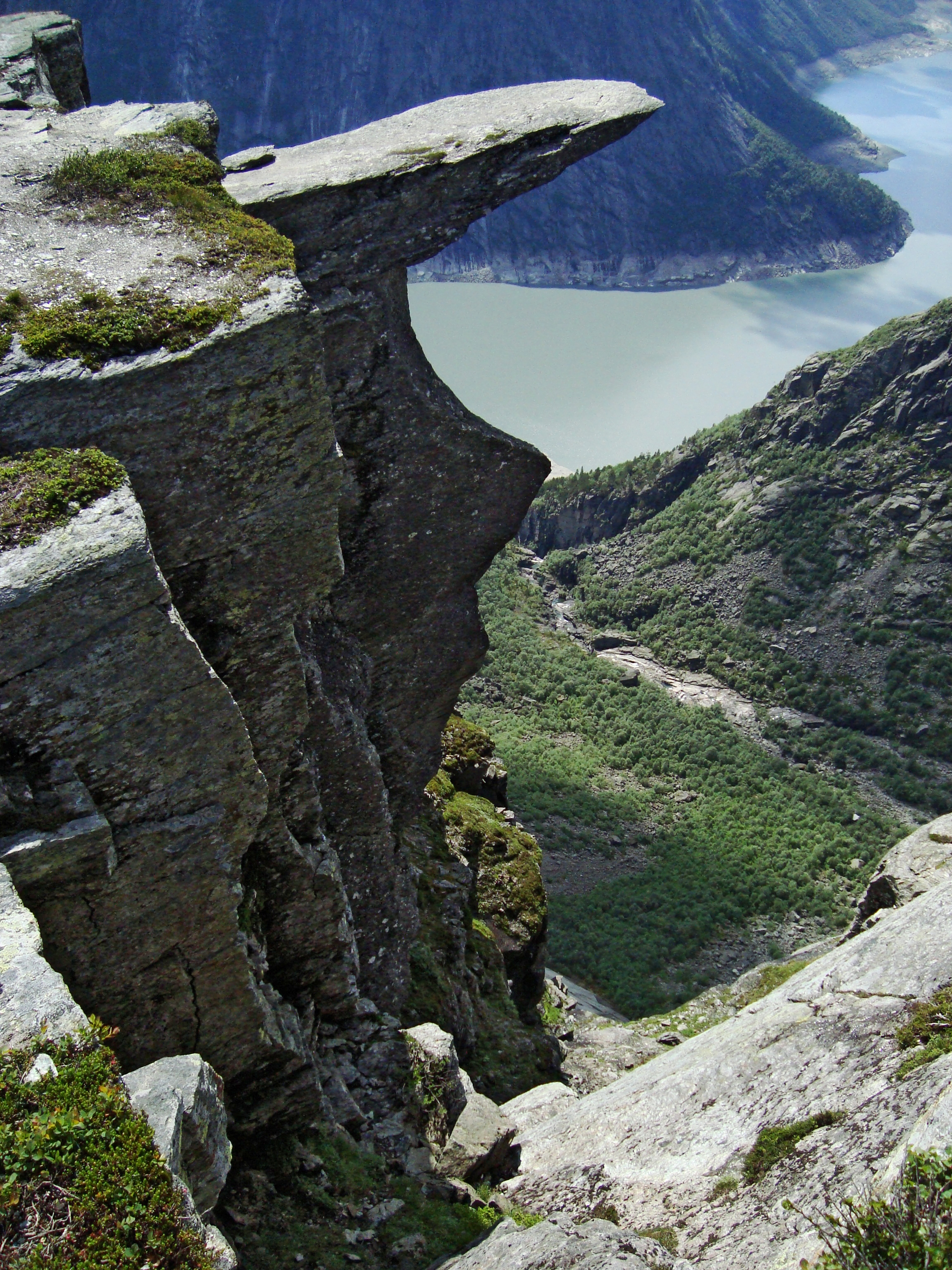
'Trolltunga' in Odda

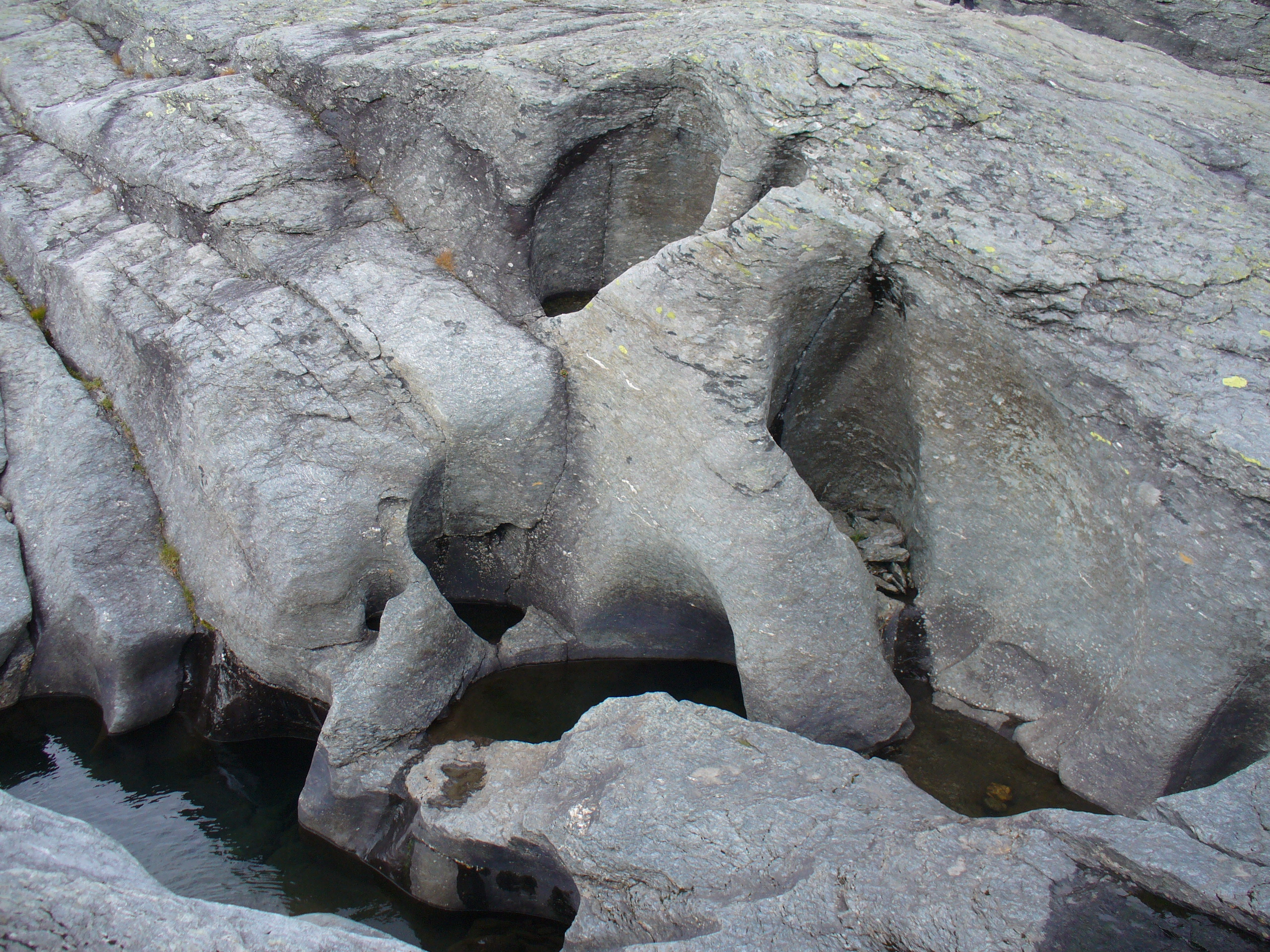
Lunar landscape of 'Jettegryter', Glacial potholes, nearby 'Trolltunga'

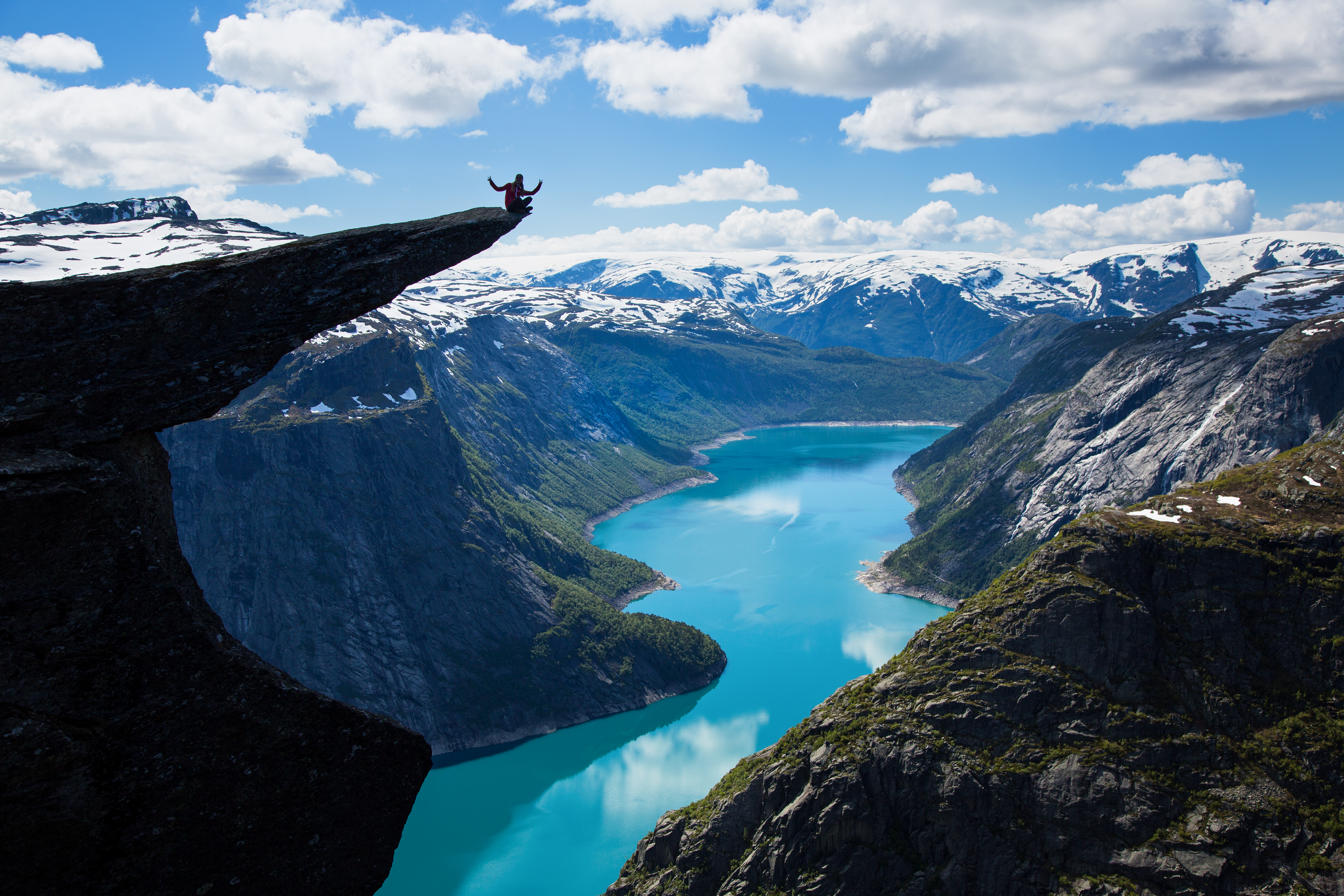
Trolltunga cliff

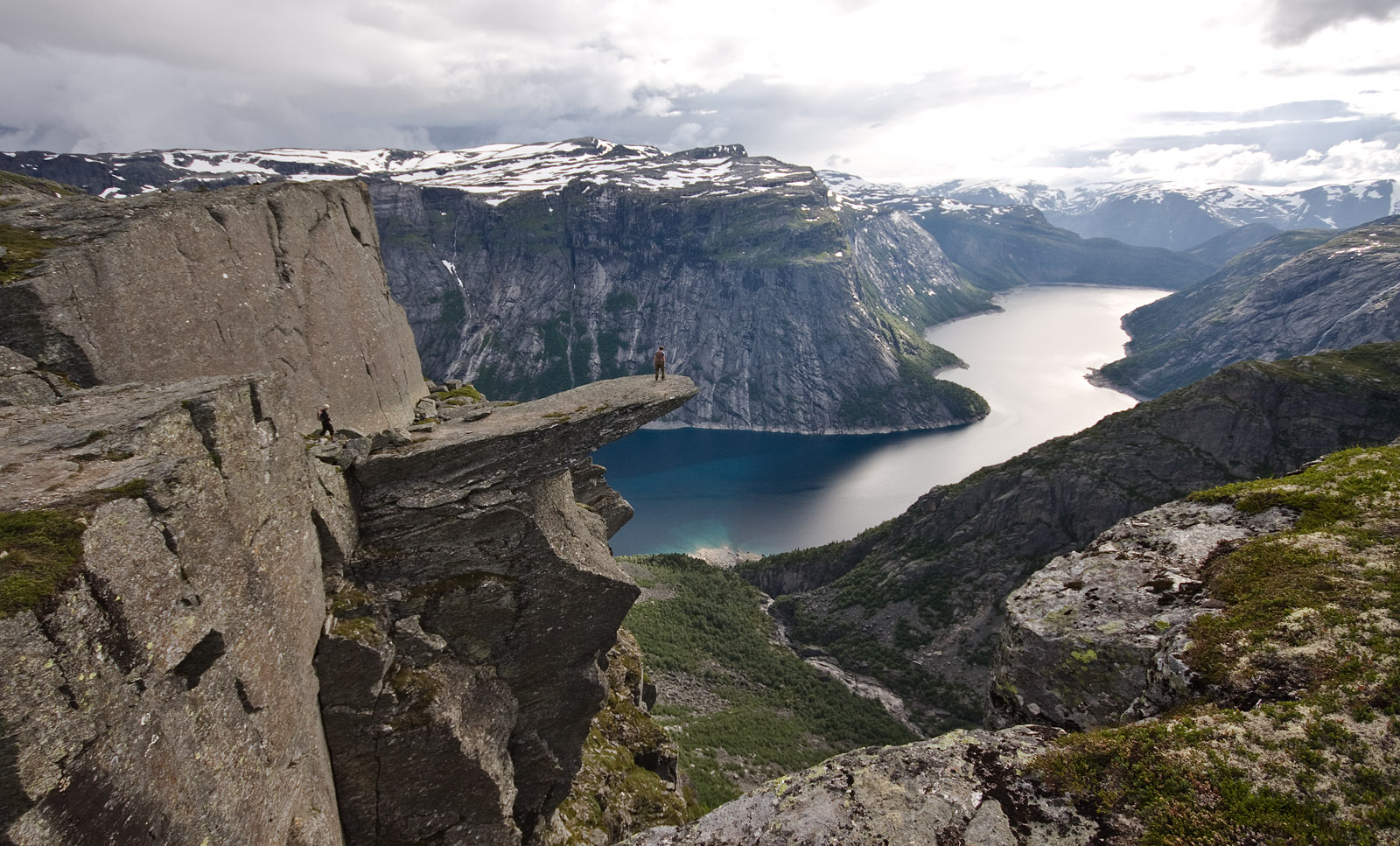
View of Trolltunga

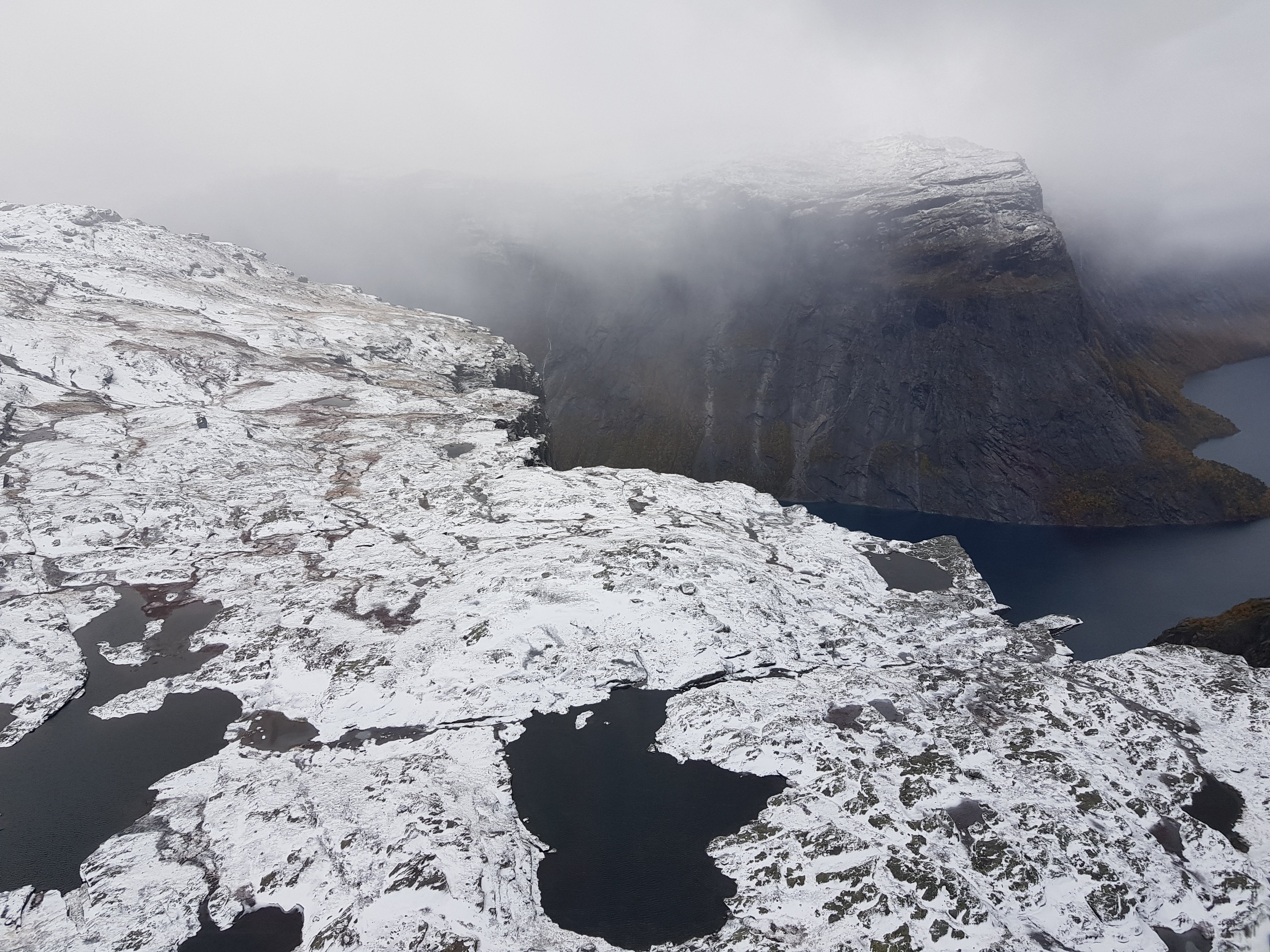
View of Trolltunga from the air in early October

== See also ==
- Besseggen
- De syv søstre
- Instagram tourism
- Kjerag
- Kjeragbolten
- List of waterfalls
- National parks of Norway
- Preikestolen
- Trollgaren
- Trollpikken
- Trollveggen
- Trollstigen
