= Ringedalsvatnet =

Lake in Vestland, Norway

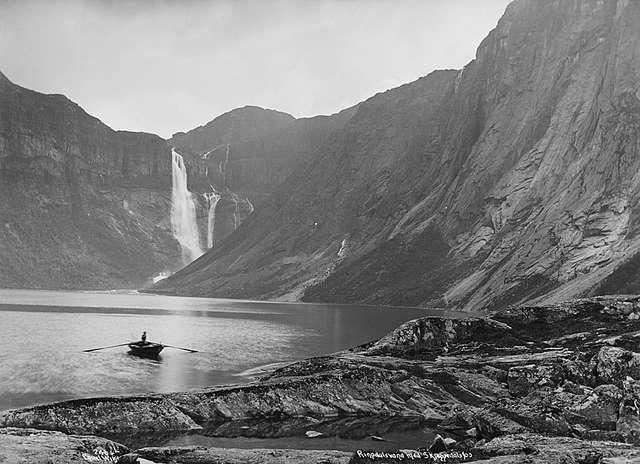
- View of the lake with Ringedalsfossen in the background (c. 1885)
- Interactive map of Ringedalsvatnet
- Location: Ullensvang Municipality, Vestland
- Coordinates: 60.1226°N 6.6557°E
- Basin countries: Norway
- Max. length: 8 kilometres (5.0 mi)
- Max. width: 1 kilometre (0.62 mi)
- Surface area: 7 km^{2} (2.7 sq mi)
- Water volume: 426,000,000 m^{3} (557,000,000 yd^{3})
- Shore length^{1}: 465 kilometres (289 mi)
- Surface elevation: 18.36 metres (60.2 ft)
- References: NVE
- ^{1} Shore length is not a well-defined measure.

Ringedalsvatnet is a lake in Ullensvang Municipality in Vestland county, Norway. The 7-square-kilometre (2.7 sq mi) lake sits just east of the village of Skjeggedal and about 3.5 kilometres (2.2 mi) east (up the valley) from the village of Tyssedal, which sits on the shore of the Sørfjorden. The lake is the main reservoir for a hydroelectric power station in Tyssedal which provides electricity for the power intensive industries in the nearby town of Odda. The 521-metre (1,709 ft) wide and 33-metre (108 ft) high Ringedals Dam was constructed from 1910–1918.

Due to the extensive regulation of the nearby lakes such as Langavatnet and Nybuvatnet in the mountains above this lake, several of the large waterfalls that once fed Ringedalsvatnet are no longer regularly flowing. The Tyssestrengene and Ringedalsfossen waterfalls were once very notable waterfalls on the cliffs surrounding this lake. The Trolltunga cliff overlooks this lake too, attracting many tourists and hikers each year.

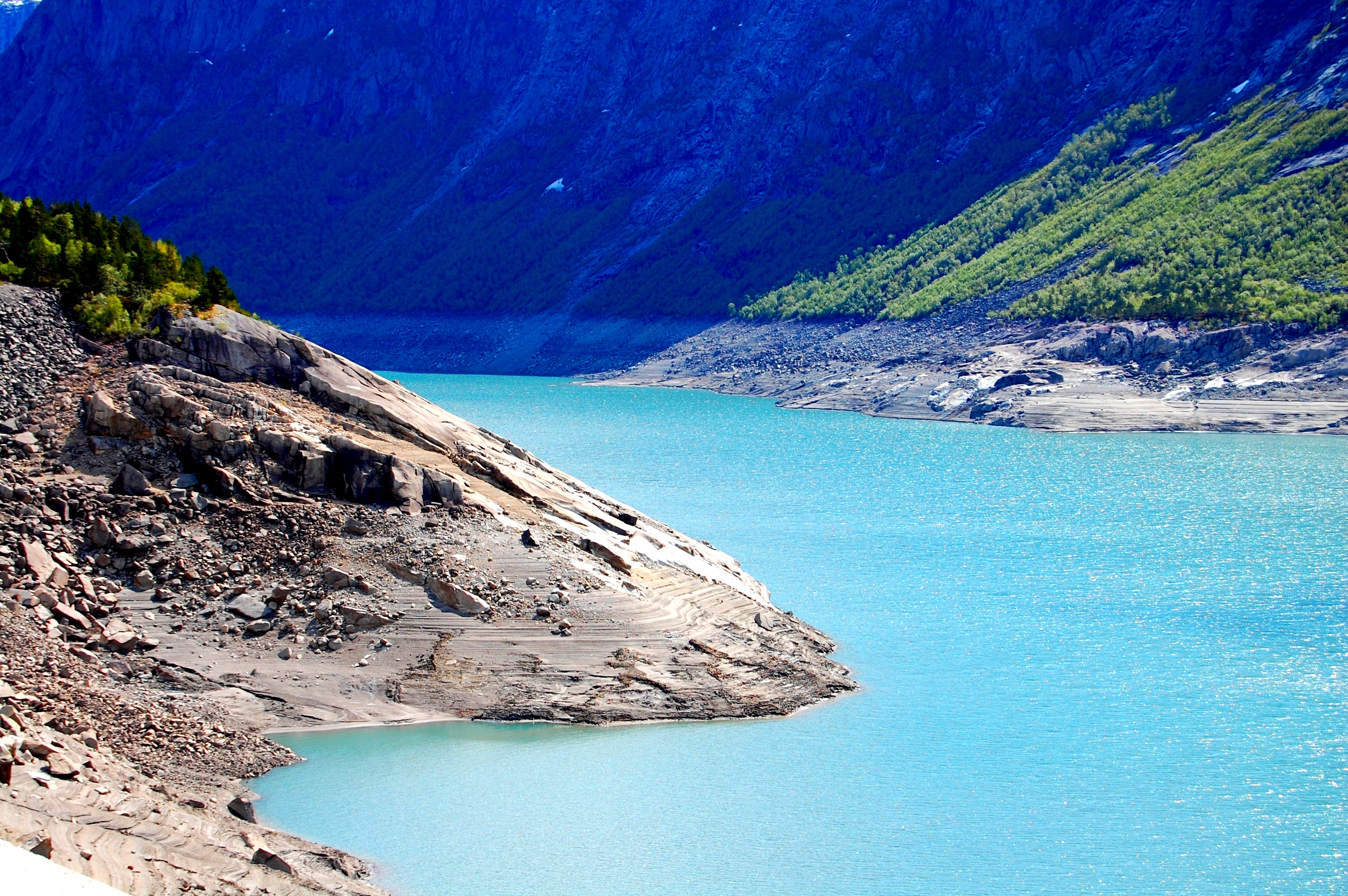
View of the lake, from the dam

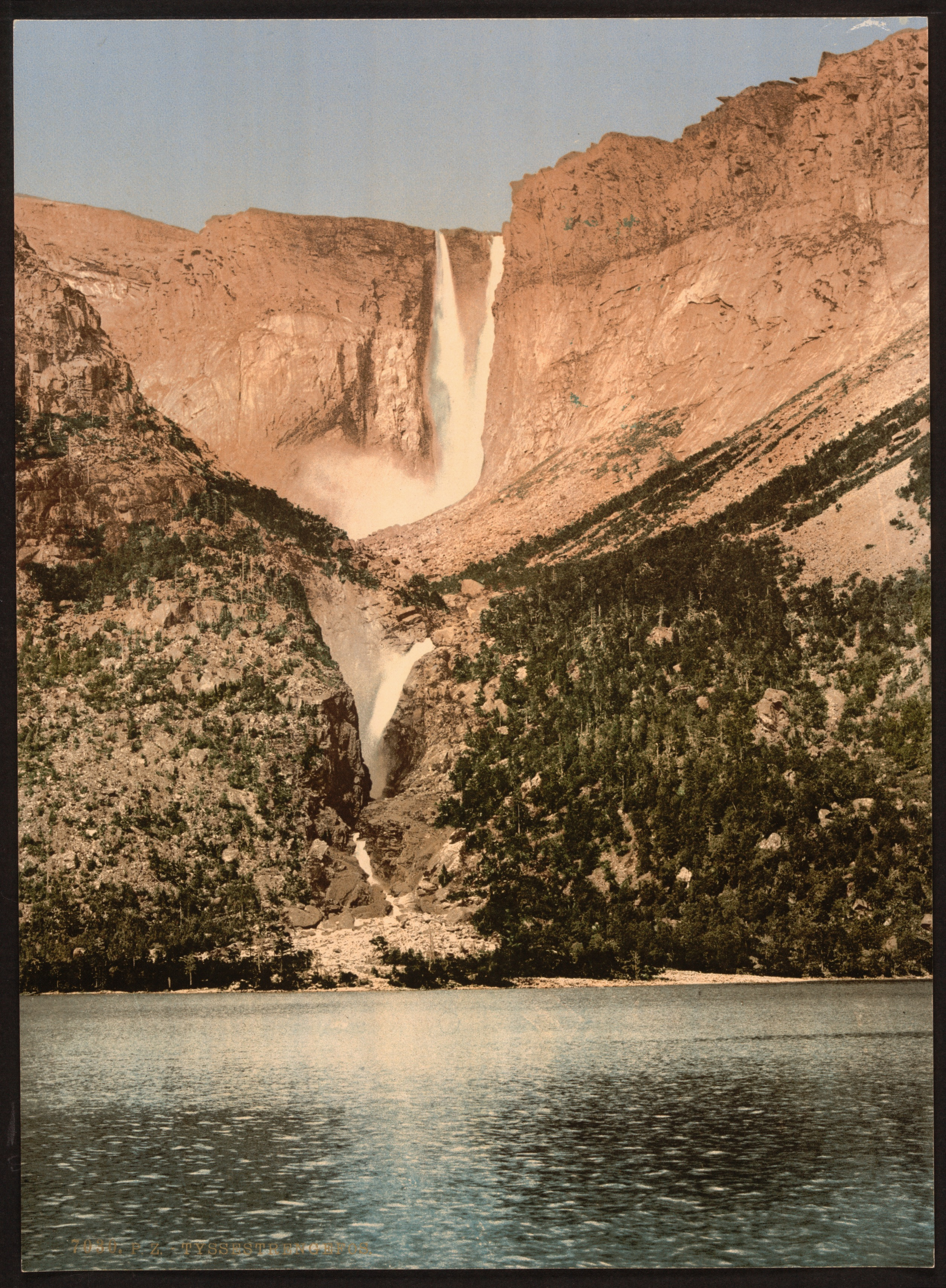
Tyssestrengene waterfall

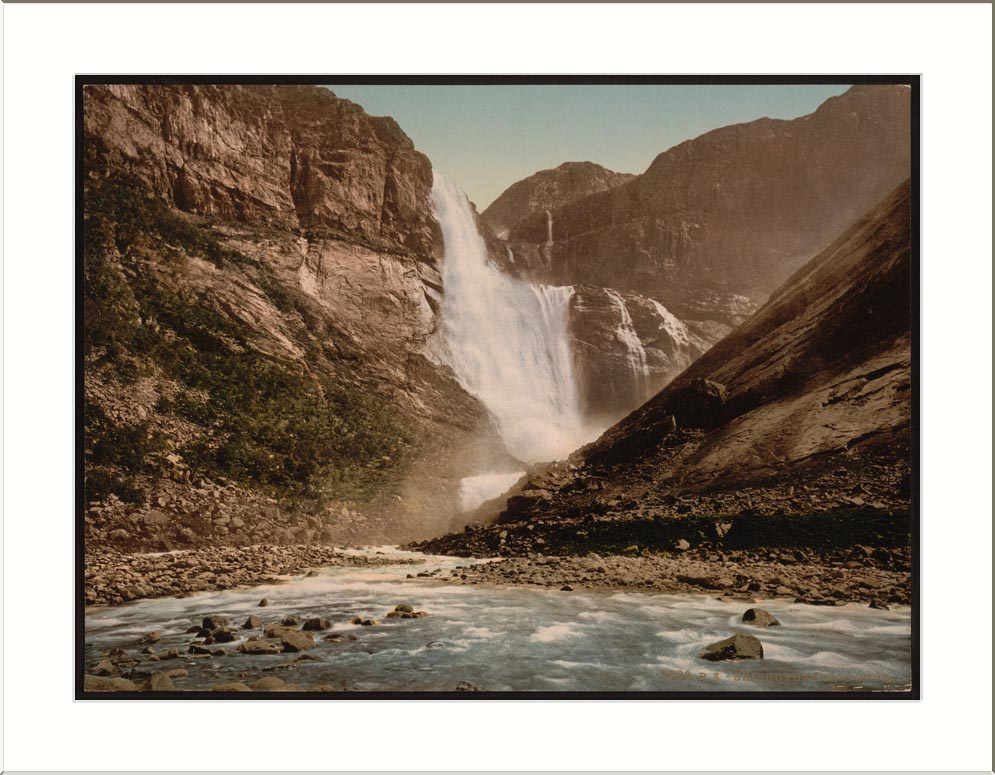
Ringedalsfossen

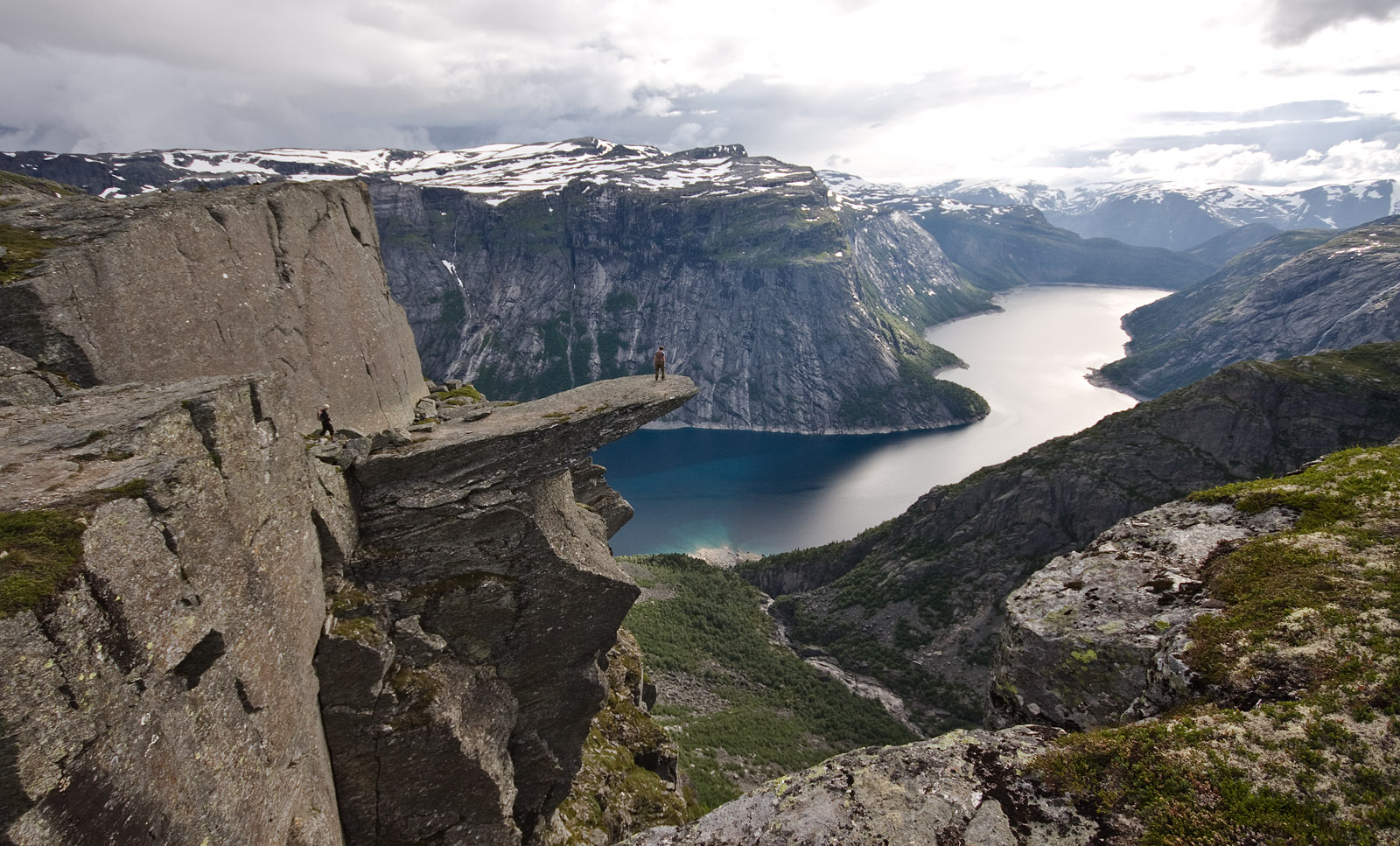
View of the Trolltunga outcropping

== See also ==
- List of lakes in Norway
