= Langavatnet (Odda) =

Lake in Vestland, Norway

- Interactive map of Langavatnet
- Location: Ullensvang Municipality, Vestland
- Coordinates: 60.0659°N 6.7496°E
- Basin countries: Norway
- Max. length: 4.7 kilometres (2.9 mi)
- Max. width: 2.3 kilometres (1.4 mi)
- Surface area: 6.19 km^{2} (2.39 sq mi)
- Shore length^{1}: 13.4 kilometres (8.3 mi)
- Surface elevation: 1,190 metres (3,900 ft)
- References: NVE
- ^{1} Shore length is not a well-defined measure.

Langavatnet is a lake in Ullensvang Municipality in Vestland county, Norway. The 6.19-square-kilometre (2.39 sq mi) lake lies about 10 kilometres (6.2 mi) straight east of the town of Odda. The lake has a dam at the north end to regulate the water level for the purposes of hydroelectric power generation. The water of the lake previously flowed north to create the large Ringedalsfossen waterfall which now only flows when the lake gets too full. The water flows over the falls into the lake Ringedalsvatnet (which has a dam at its western end) before flowing through the short river Tysso which empties into the Sørfjorden.

== See also ==
- List of lakes in Norway
