= Ringedals Dam =

Coordinates: 60.1281°N 6.6357°E

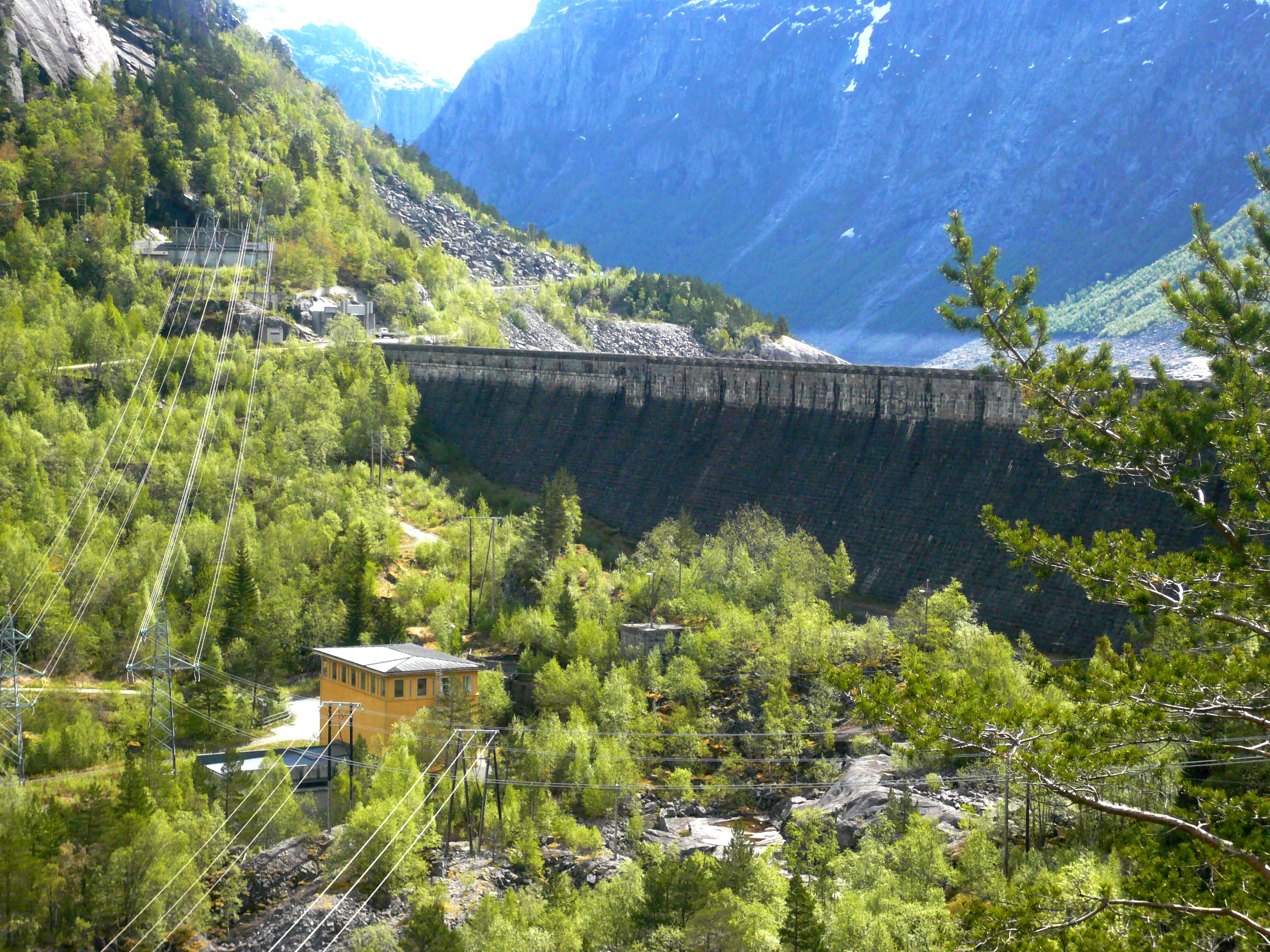
- Ringedals dam, Skjeggedal Pumping Station and Tysso II
- Interactive map of Ringedals Dam
- Location: Ringedalsvatnet, Norway
- Construction began: 1909
- Opening date: 1918

Dam and spillways
- Type of dam: Gravity dam
- Height: 33 metres (108 ft)
- Length: 521 metres (1,709 ft)
- Width (crest): 4 metres (13 ft)
- Width (base): 21.5 metres (71 ft)

Reservoir
- Total capacity: 426 million m^{3}

Ringedals Dam is a gravity dam by Ringedalsvatnet at Tyssedal in Ullensvang Municipality in Vestland county, Norway. The dam was built in stages between 1909 and 1918 in connection with the hydroelectric power plant in Tyssedal and the factories in Odda. When the dam was completed in 1918 it was one of Europe’s largest gravity dams with a reservoir capacity of 222,000,000 cubic metres (180,000 acre⋅ft). The dam is built in Cyclopean concrete with 30% large-sized stones (plums) and dressed on both sides with approximately 20,000 square metres (220,000 sq ft) of hand-cut granite stone, the largest of its kind in Norway. The dam is crowned by the date and initials of managing director Ragnvald Blakstad and topped with merlons in Neo-Romanesque style.

Ringedalsvatnet is today the reservoir of Oksla Hydroelectric Power Plant at Sørfjorden. The reservoir has a capacity of 426,000,000 cubic metres (345,000 acre⋅ft) and the power station is every year producing approximately 900 gigawatt-hours (3,200 TJ).

== History ==
=== Transfer tunnels ===
In the bedrock under the Ringedals Dam there are three tunnels. In 1903, three years before AS Tyssefaldene was established, the first underwater tunnel that pierced into the natural lake reservoir was made by the drill and blast method. The transfer tunnel was 100 meters long and named after the owner, Bruuns tunnel. The tunnel could lower the Ringedalsvatnet 10 meters, down to 428 meters above sea level. Later Bruuns Tunnel was made bigger and today a penstock pipe lifts the water from Skjeggedal Pumping Station to Ringedalsvatnet (pumped-storage hydroelectricity).

When the first stage of Tyssedal Power Station was built from 1906 to 1908, there was no need for a dam and reservoir. Ringedalsvatnet could be regulated 16 meters by a new transfer tunnel and valves. In 1907 a 160-meter-long tunnel with a cross section of 6.5–7 m² was cut out of the bedrock. The tunnel is named after the responsible engineer, Thorvald Schult (1874-1937). The valve house is also called "Schultsynken". The last tunnel under the dam is called Brekkes tunnel and is not in use.

When the smelting works in Odda needed more power from Tyssedal Power Station, a new dam had to be built at Vassendfossen in Skjeggedal.

=== Building phase I (1909–1912) ===
In 1909 the construction work for the first dam started. It was built in dry-stone in granite downstream and upstream 3-meter-thick masonry. The dam consisted of 13000 m³ of stone and cement. When it was completed in 1912 it was 280 meters long and 16 meters high. At the bottom it was 12.5 meters and at the top 2.5 meters wide.

=== Building phase II (1914-1918) ===
From 1911 the engineer office Ing. Kinck's Vandbygningskontor made plans for the next stage. The construction work started in 1914. AS Kristiania Monier og Cementvarefabrik and AS Høyer-Ellefsen were responsible for the construction of the dam. The new dam was built upstream and on top of the old dam.

The dam is 521 meters long and 33 meters high. At the bottom it is 21.5 meters and at the top 4 meters wide. For the construction they used 80,000 m³ of stone and cement. The top is at 465 m above sea level and it can be regulated down to 418 m.

=== Spillway ===
The Ringedals Dam was controlled by three valve houses placed at different levels with a spillway on the top. The 41-meter-long spillway was originally controlled manually by five gates with needle sluices. In the 1950s two of the needle sluices were replaced by slide gates. Today all the needle gates are changed to the safer slide gates.

=== Concrete plate (1929–1931) ===
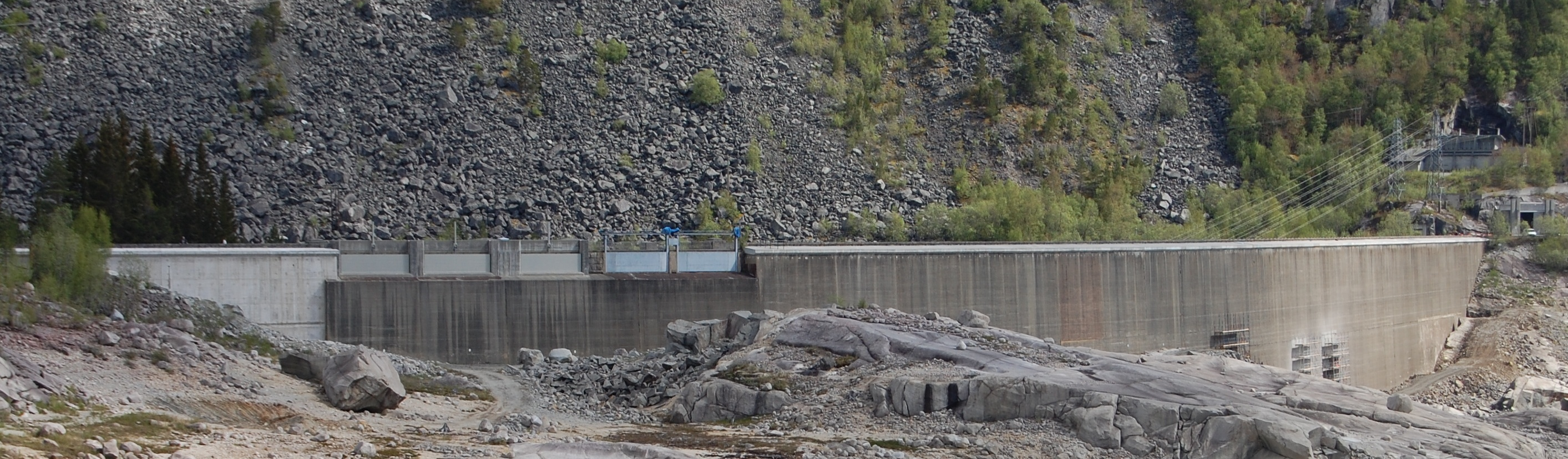
Concrete plate

After a while, Tyssefaldene experienced leakage from the dam. In 1929, the engineers at Ingeniørfirmaet Chr. F. Grøner planned a new upstream dam plate in reinforced concrete. The pioneering project was built by AS Høyer-Ellefsen using gliding formwork. The new plate was constructed two meter upstream from the original granite wall and horizontally supported by 1,700 beams. The plate is 20–47 cm thick and covers an area of 9,700 m². It consist of 68 sections with 1 horizontal and 38 vertical expansion joints with plates of copper, bitumen and asphalt. The construction of the new dam plate was finished in 1931.

=== Skjeggedal Power Station (1938) ===
From 1938 to 1980, Skjeggedal Power Station utilized the 30-meter fall from Ringedalsvatnet down to Vetlevatn. The power station produced 13.5 MVA. After Oksla Power Station opened in 1980 Skjeggedal Power Station was rebuilt to a pumping station in 1986.

=== Oksla Power Station (1980) ===
Since 1980 the Ringdals Dam has been supporting the reservoir for Oksla Power Station. From Ringdalsvatnet there is a new tunnel wherein the water is falling 465 m down to the power station, which is located at the fjord. The tunnel can regulate Ringedalsvatnet down to 373 meters.

== Images ==
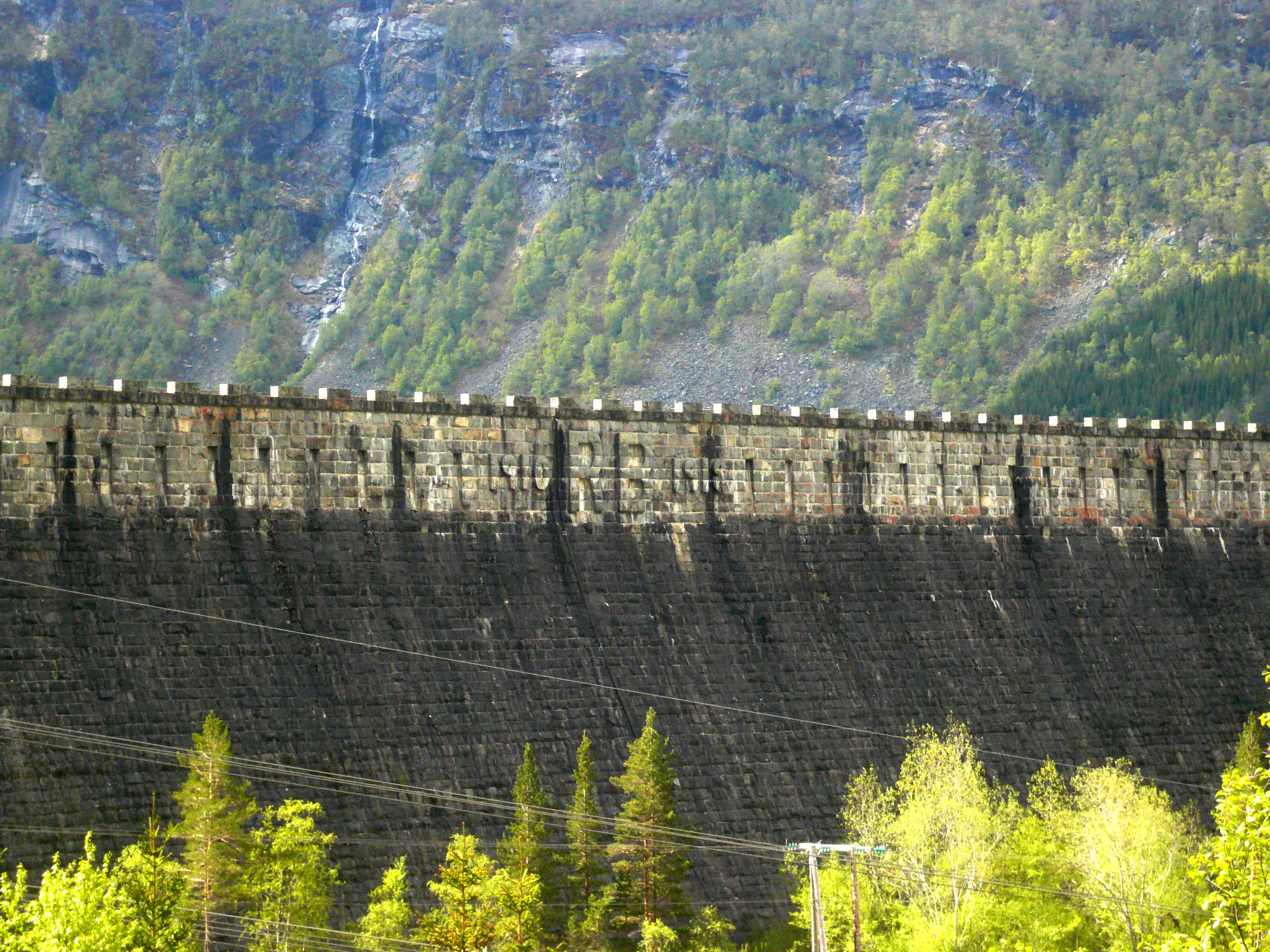
The dam is crowned by the dates 1910–1918 and initials of the managing director Ragnvald Blakstad. The letters are 4 m high

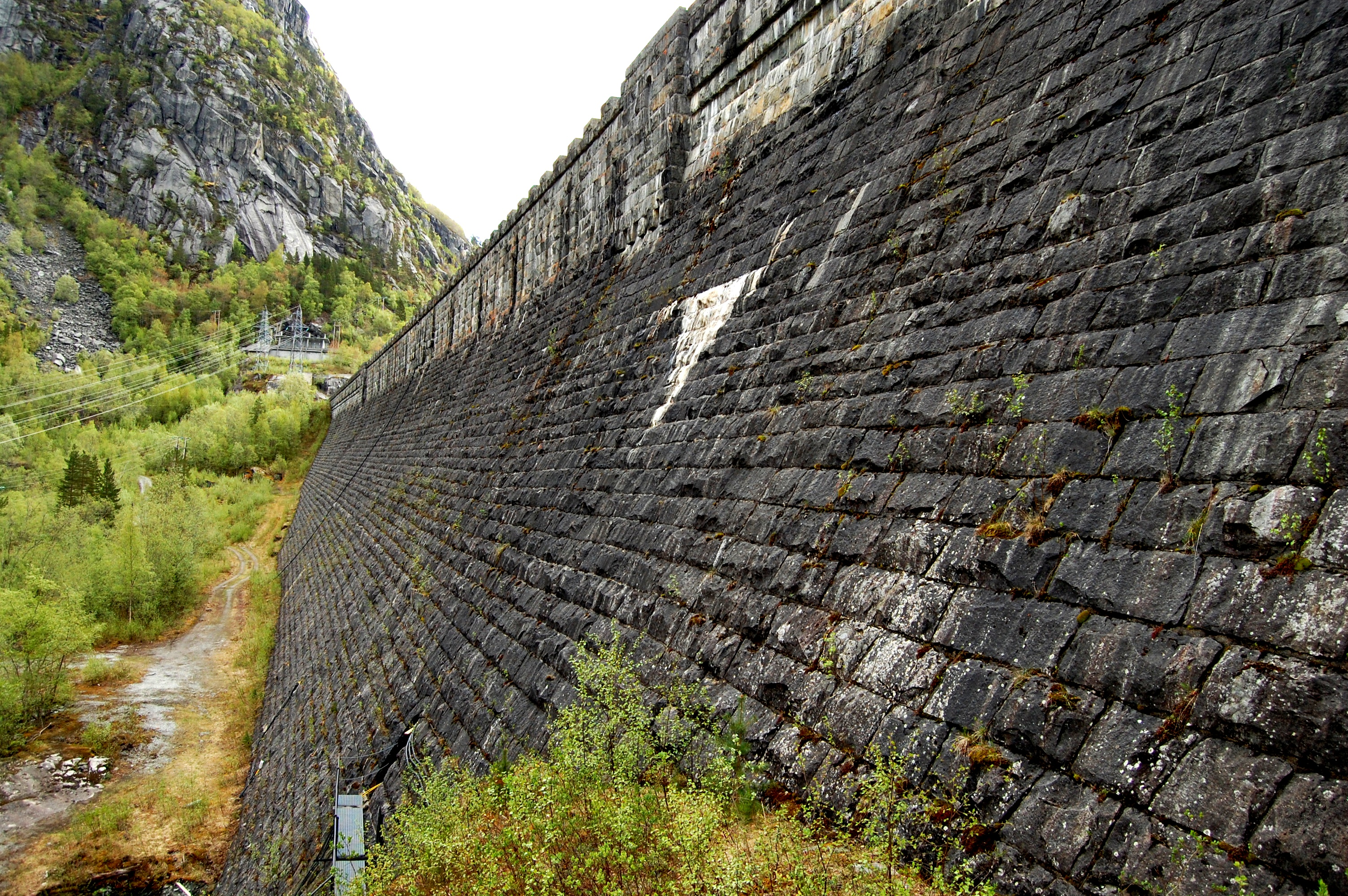
The dam was dressed on both sides with approximately 20000 m^{2} of hand cut granite stone, the largest of its kind in Norway.

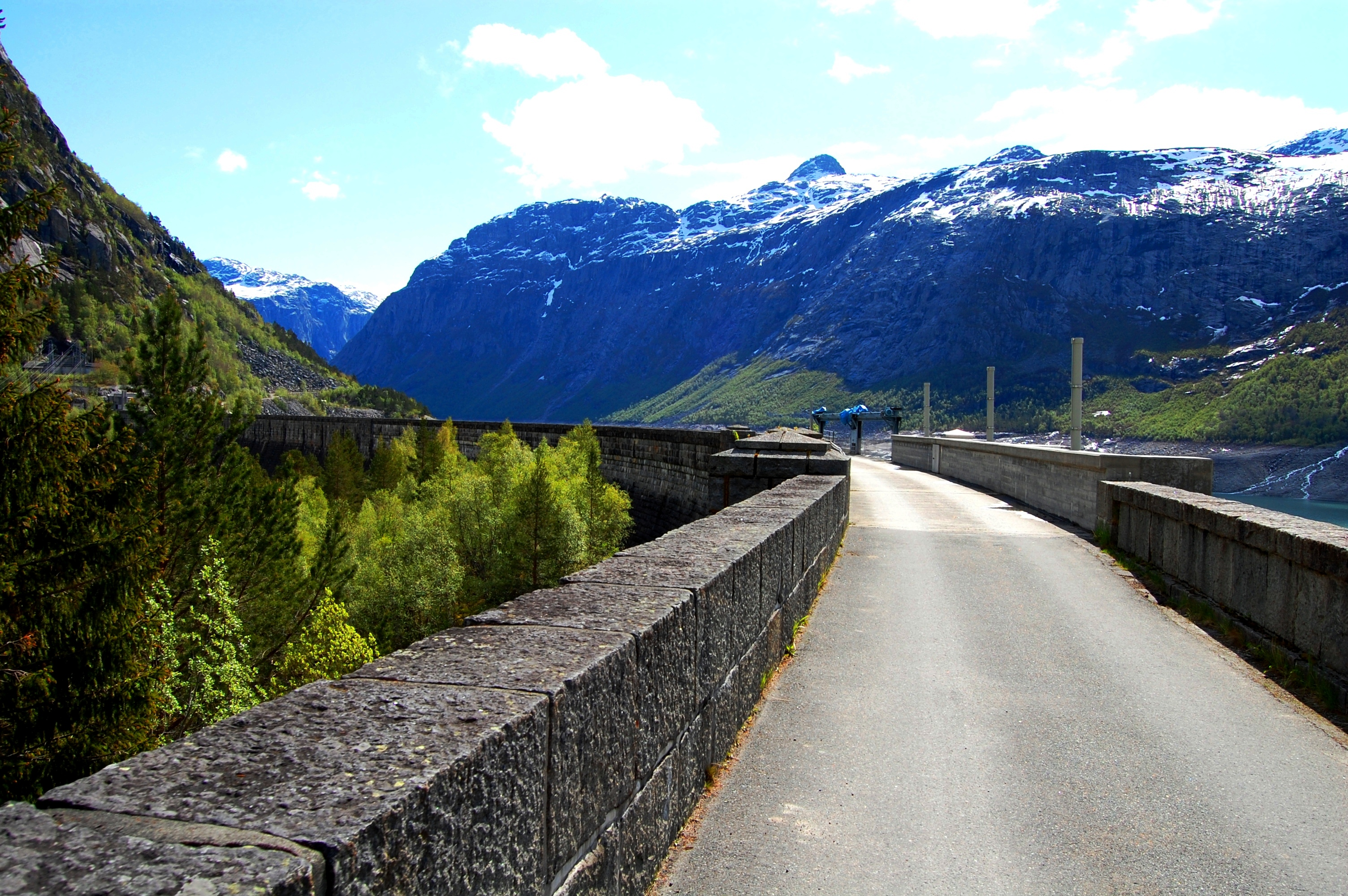
Road on the top of the dam and a spillway with five slide gates.

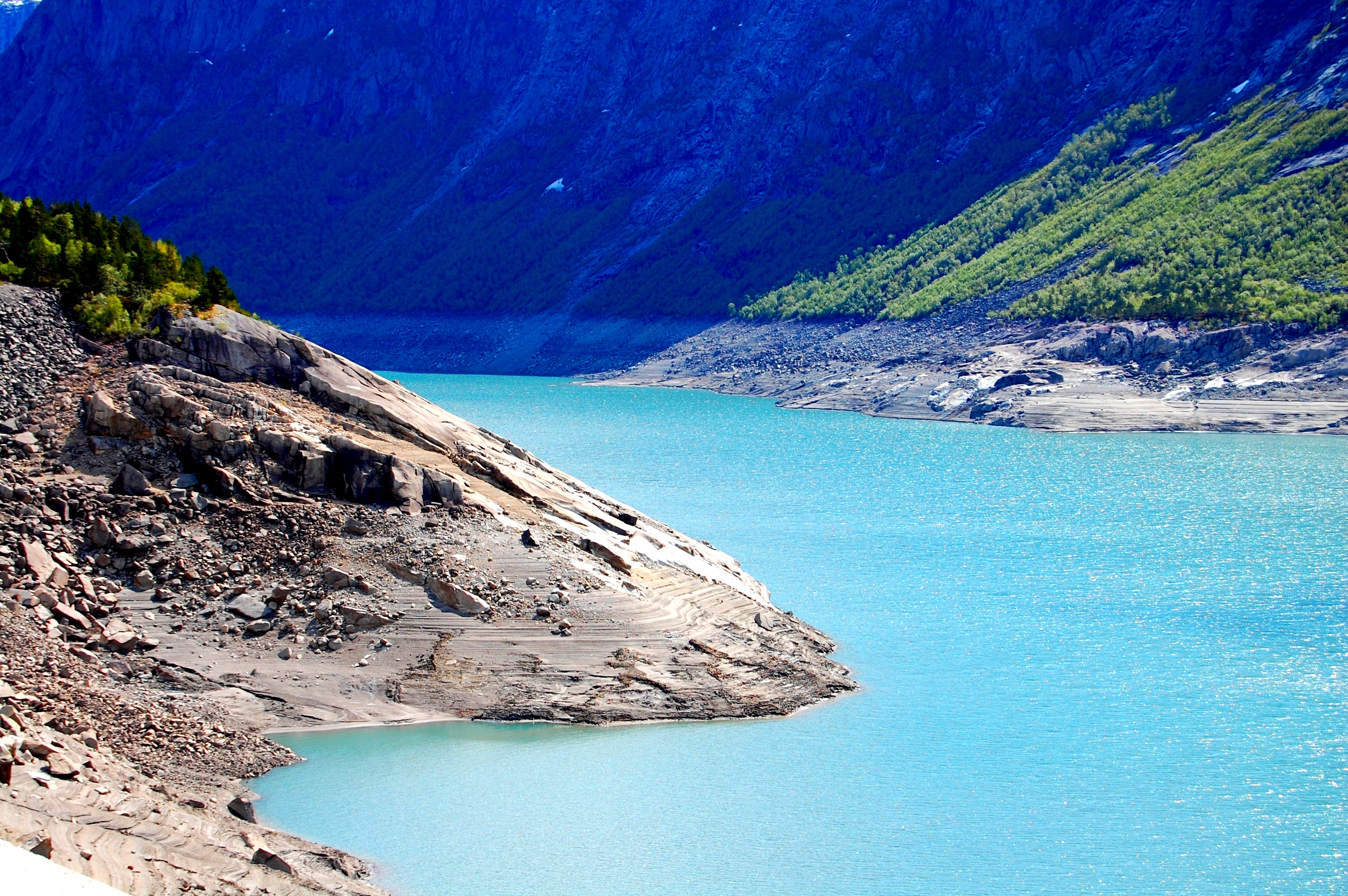
Today Ringedalsvatnet can be regulated down to 373 meters above sea level.

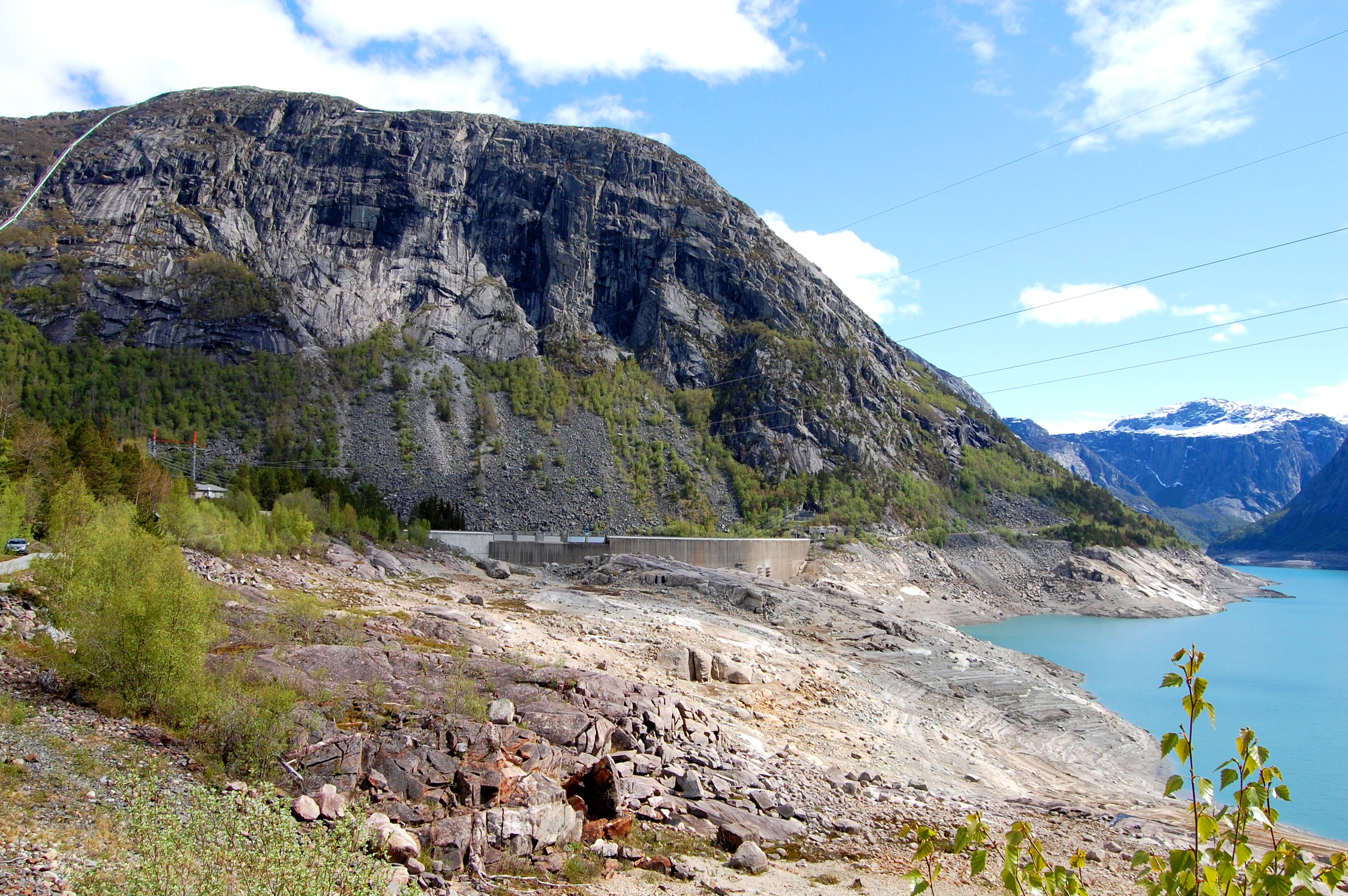
Dam in landscape

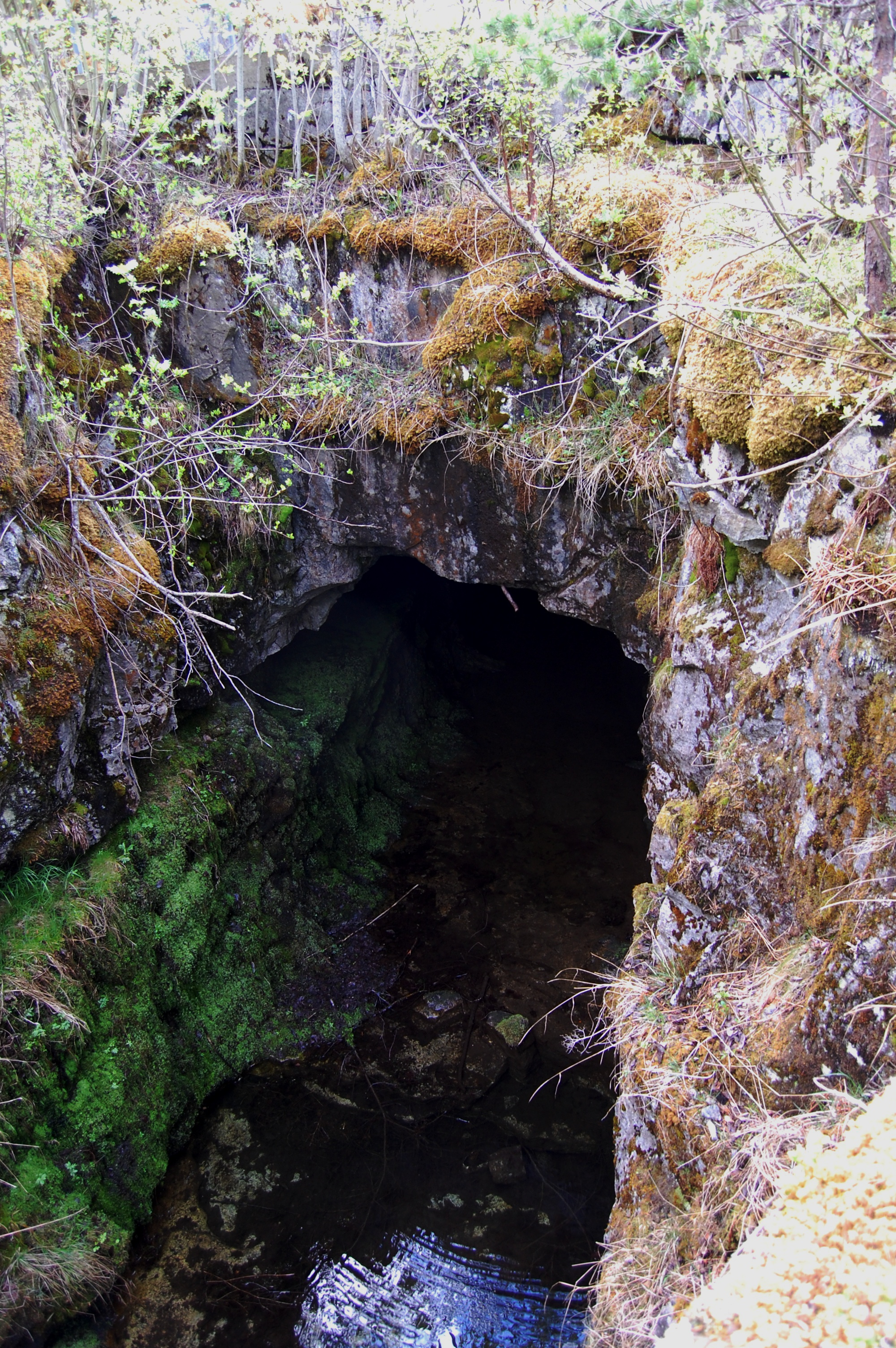
"Schult’s tunnel" was a tunnel between Ringedalsvatnet and Vetlevann.

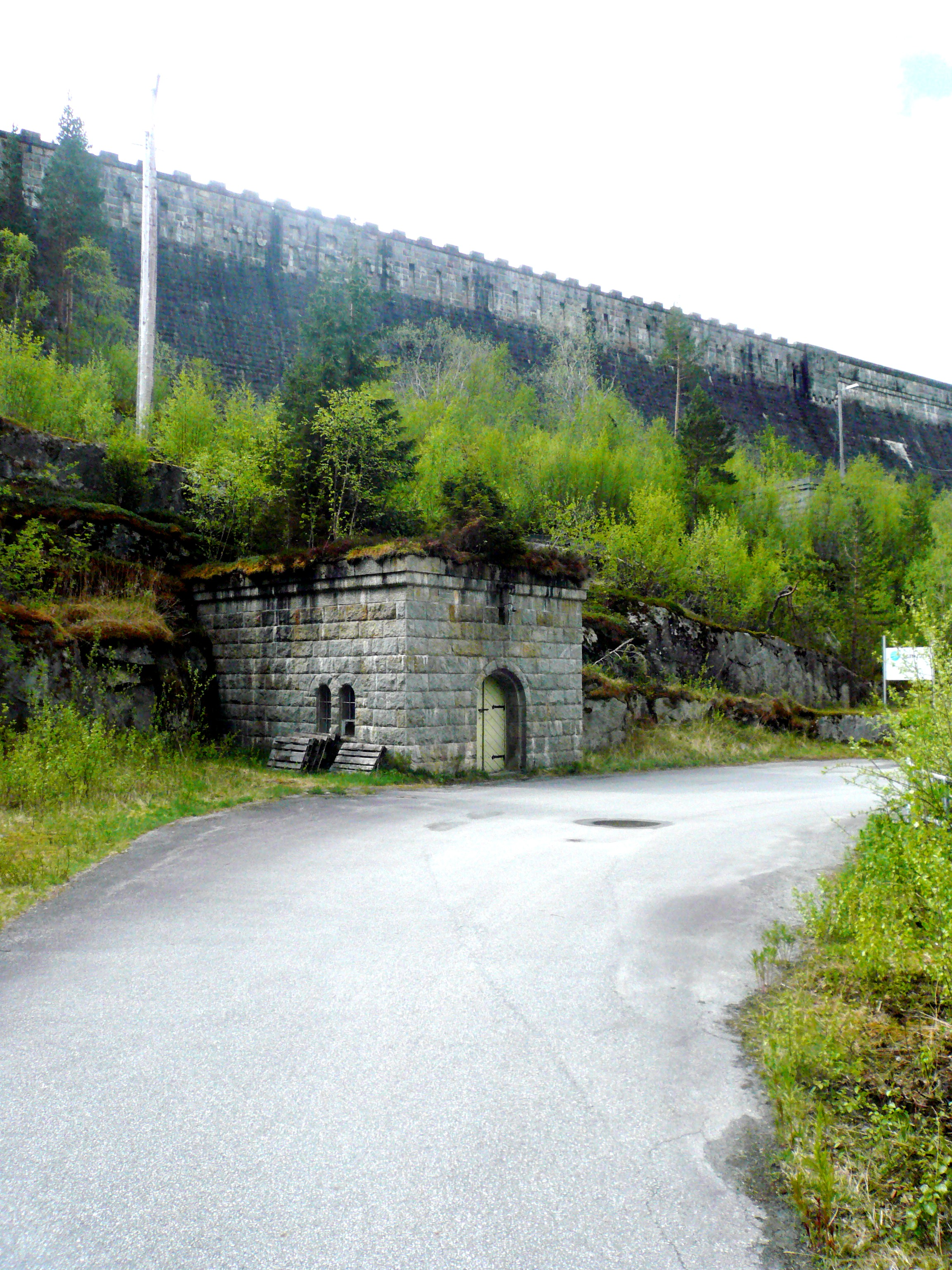
"Schultssynken" at Ringedals dam

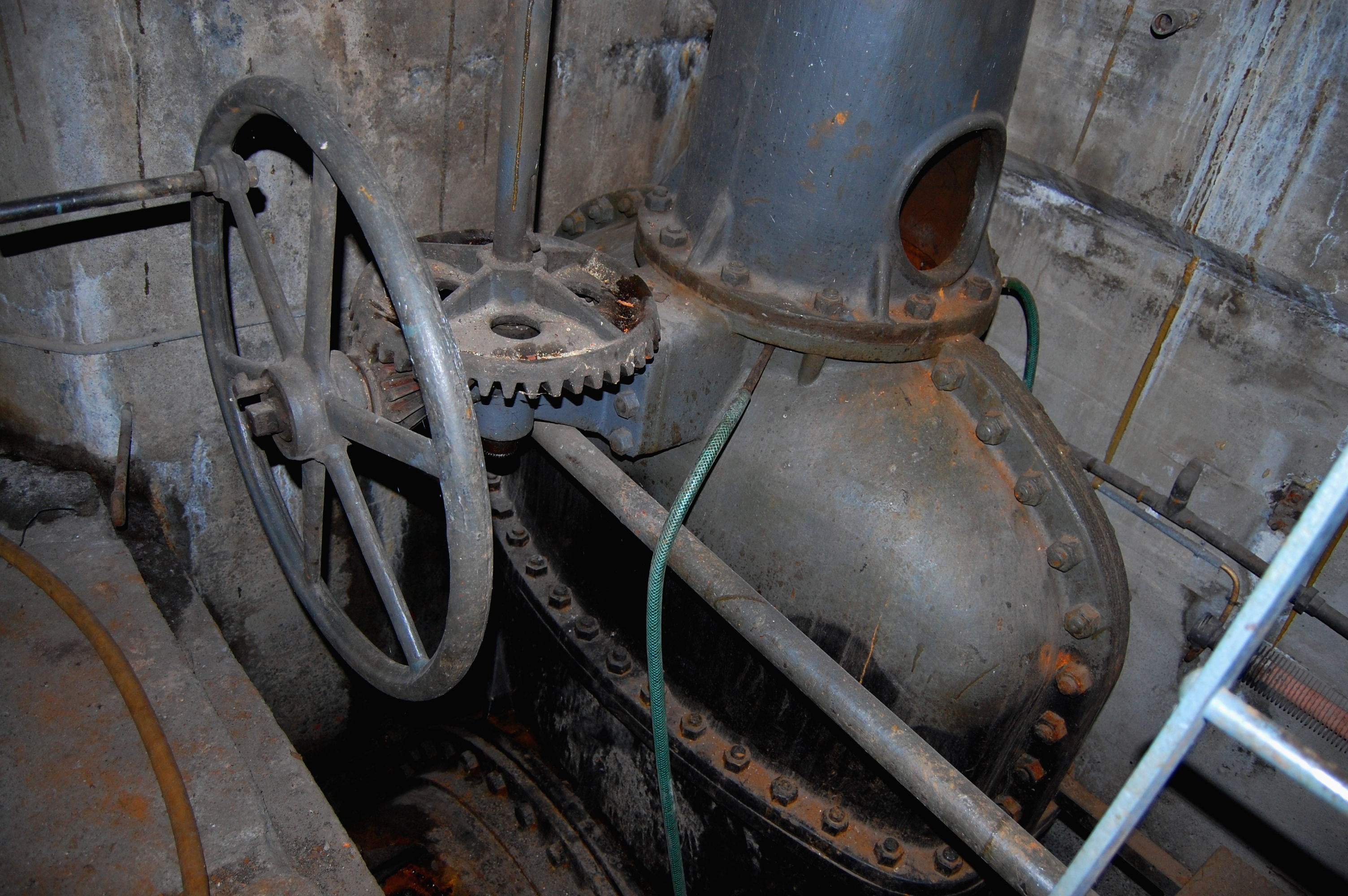
Valve at "Schultssynken"

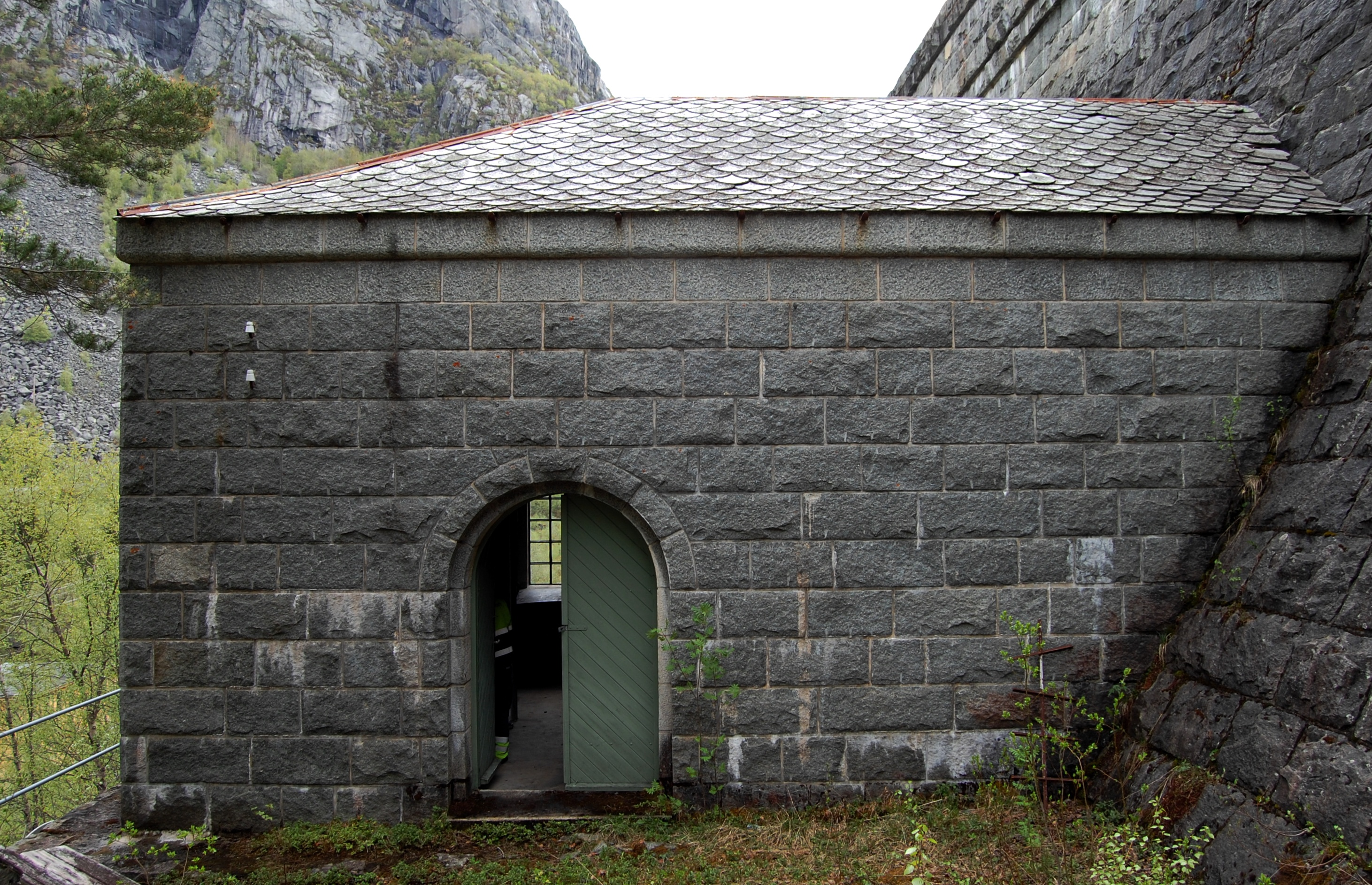
Valve house

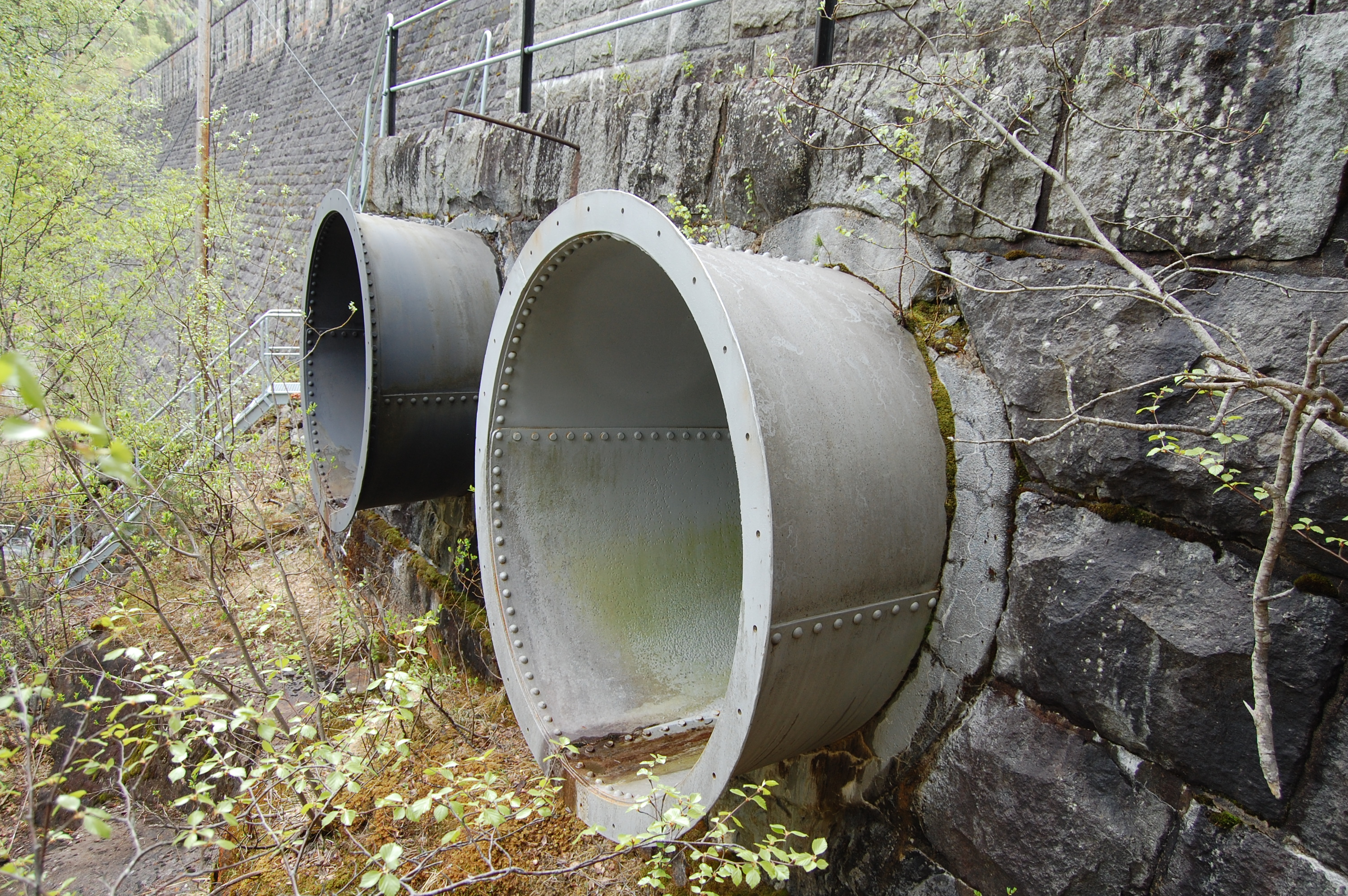
Two pipes at the valve house on the top

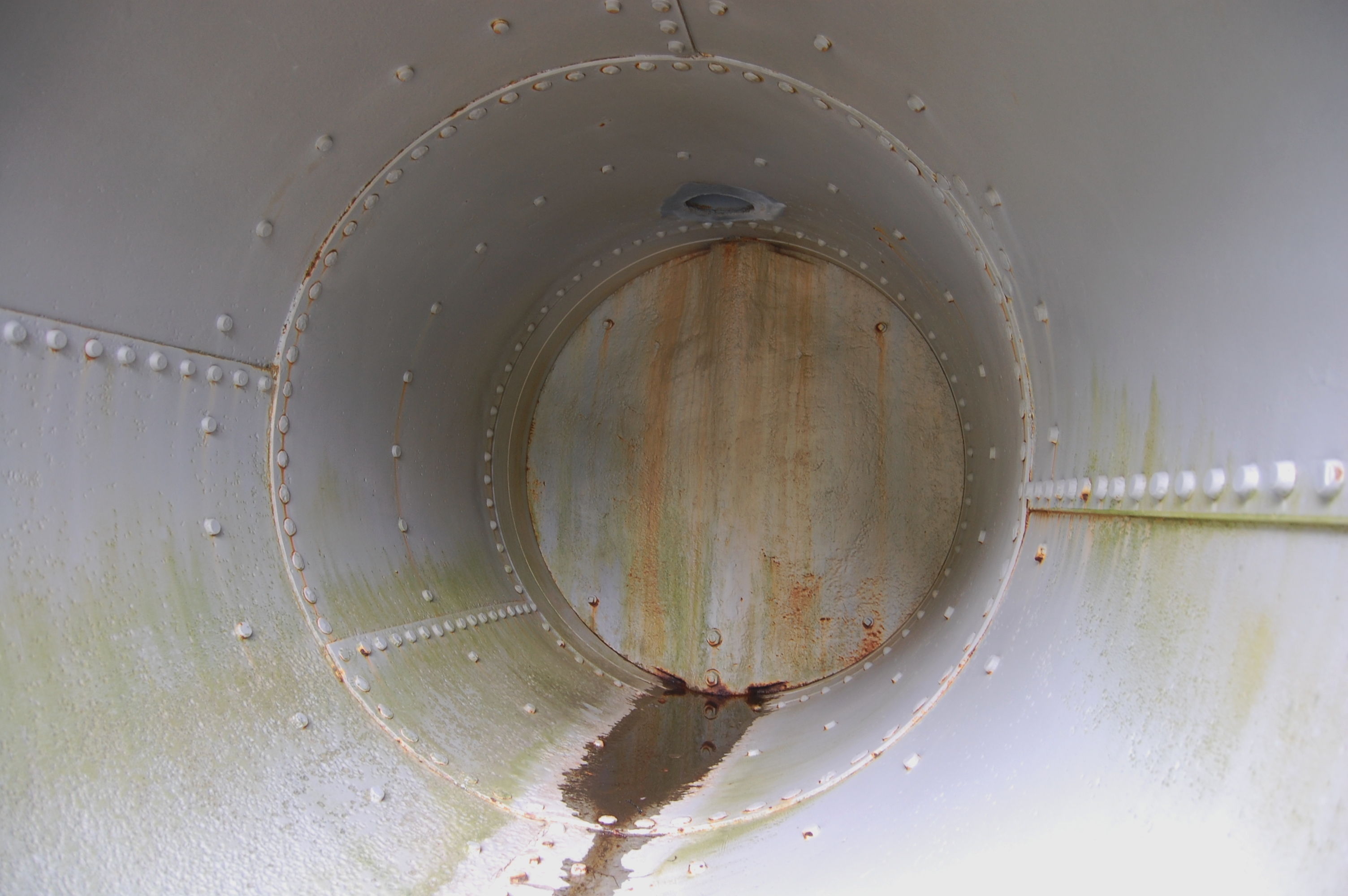
Butterfly valve

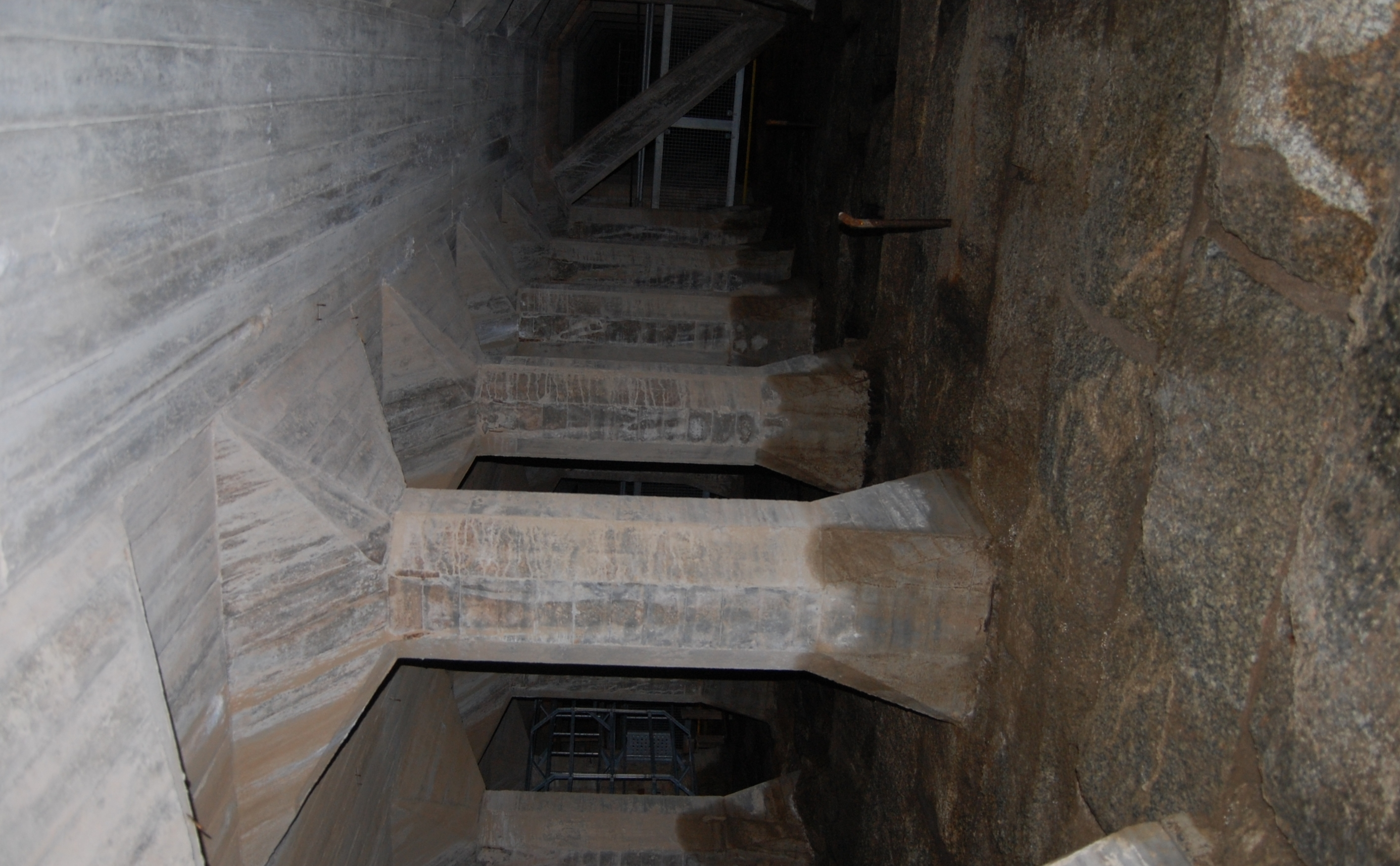
It is two meters between the new concrete plate and the original upstream face in granite. The concrete plate built 1929-31 is supported by 1700 horizontal beams.

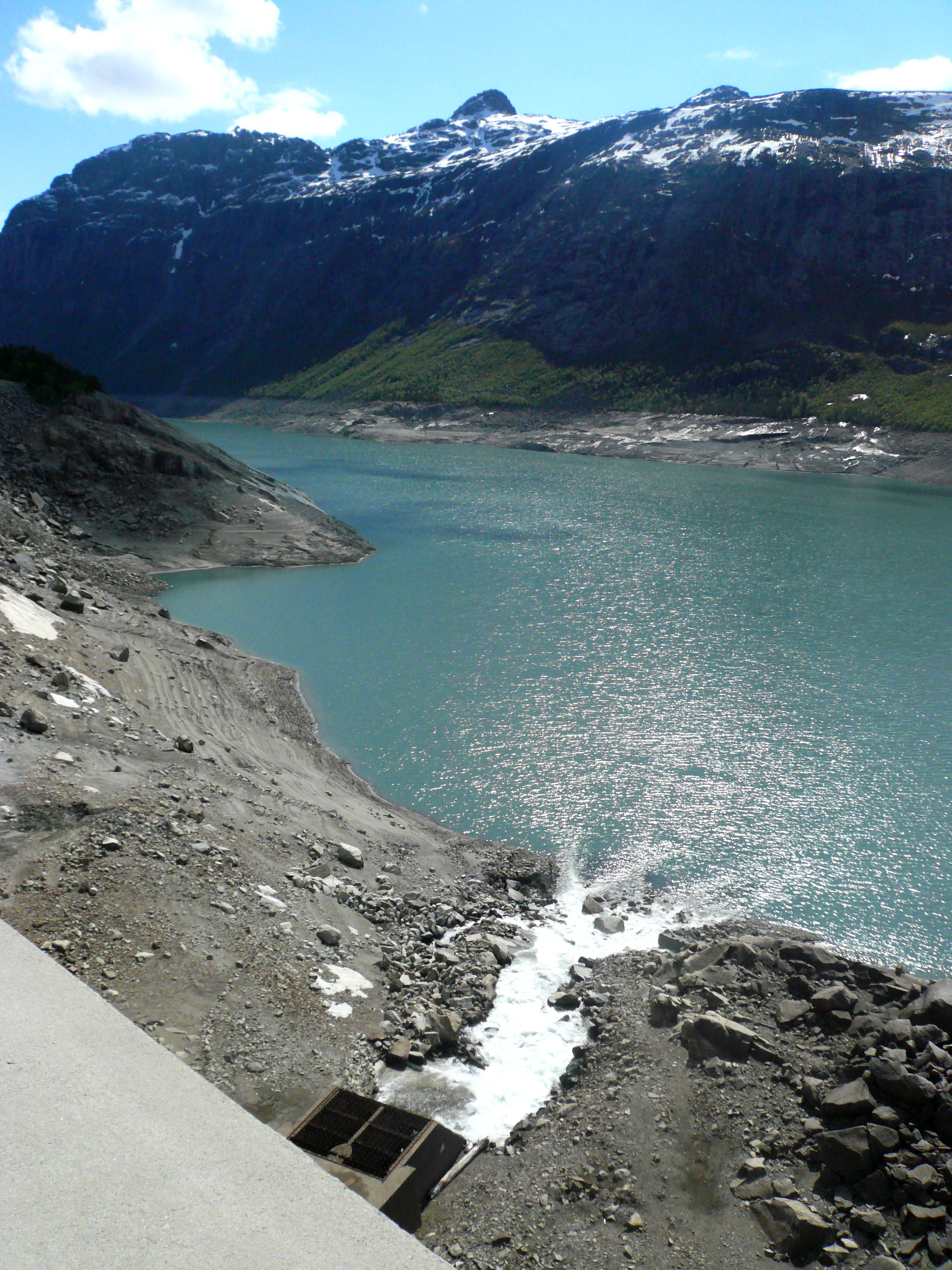
Ringedalsvatnet seen from the dam. Water is pumped into the reservoir from Skjeggedal Pumping Station
