= Skjeggedal, Vestland =

Village in Ullensvang Municipality, Norway

Skjeggedal
- Village
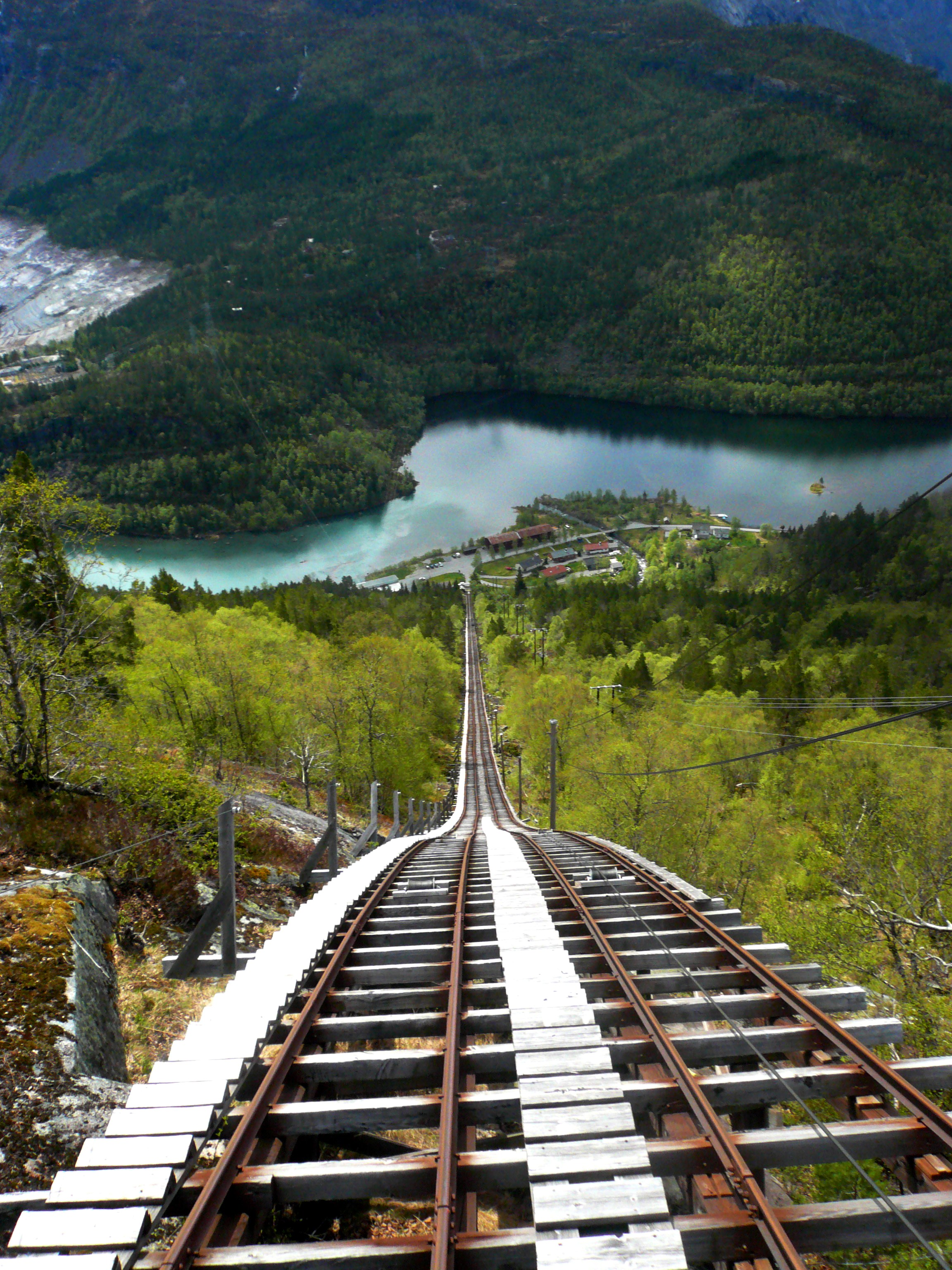
- View of the village from the mountain above
- Interactive map of Skjeggedal
- Coordinates: 60.13333°N 6.63333°E
- Country: Norway
- Region: Western Norway
- County: Vestland
- District: Hardanger
- Municipality: Ullensvang Municipality
- Elevation: 514 m (1,686 ft)
- Time zone: UTC+01:00 (CET)
  - Summer (DST): UTC+02:00 (CEST)
- Post Code: 5770 Tyssedal

Skjeggedal is a small village in Ullensvang Municipality in Vestland county, Norway. The village lies on the northern shore of the lake Vetlevatnet, about 5 kilometres (3.1 mi) northeast of the village of Tyssedal and about 10 kilometres (6.2 mi) northwest of the town of Odda. The village is mostly made up of holiday cottages and a large hydroelectric power station near the large Ringedals Dam on the lake Ringedalsvatnet.

== Media gallery ==
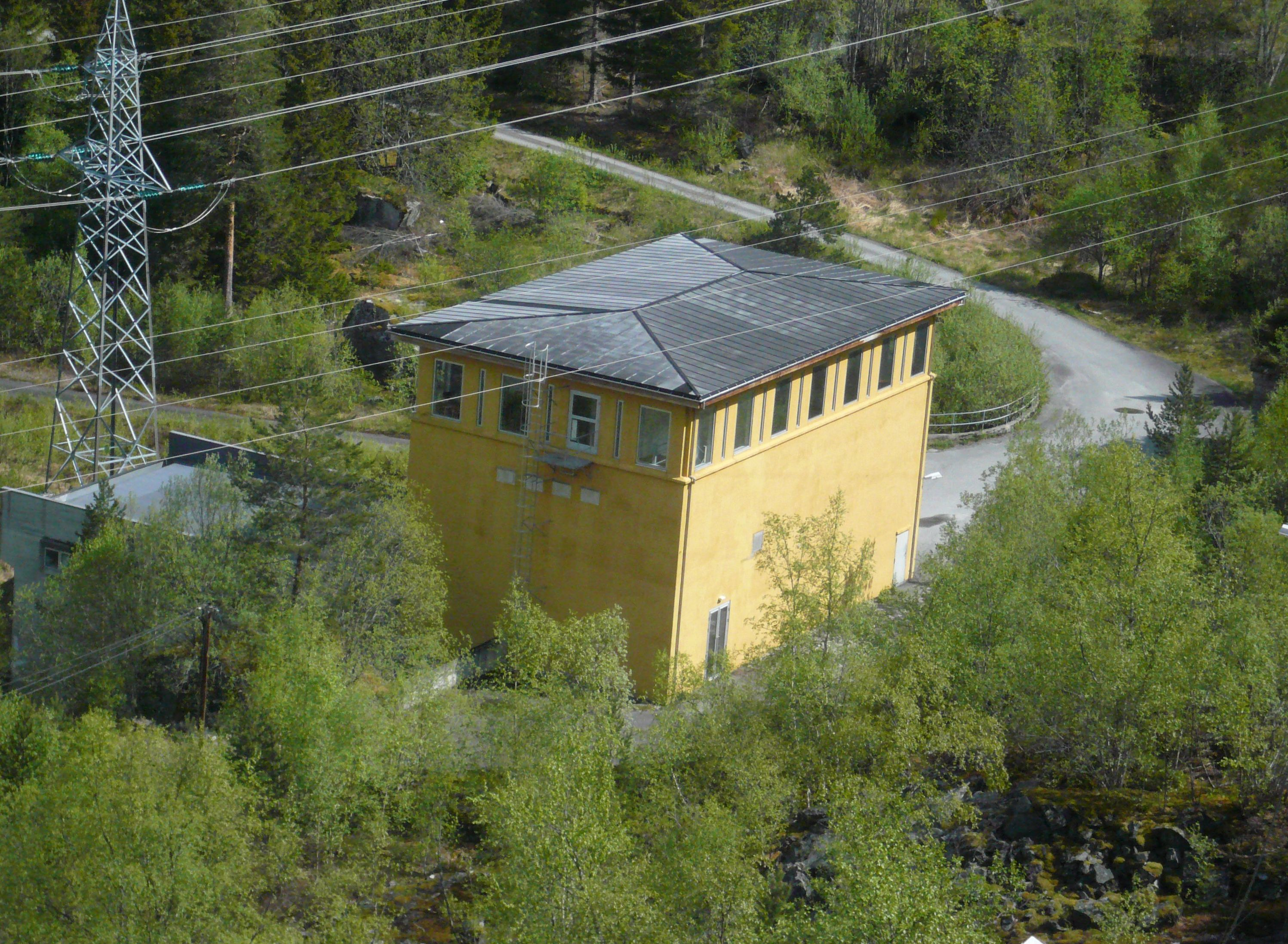
Skjeggedal power station

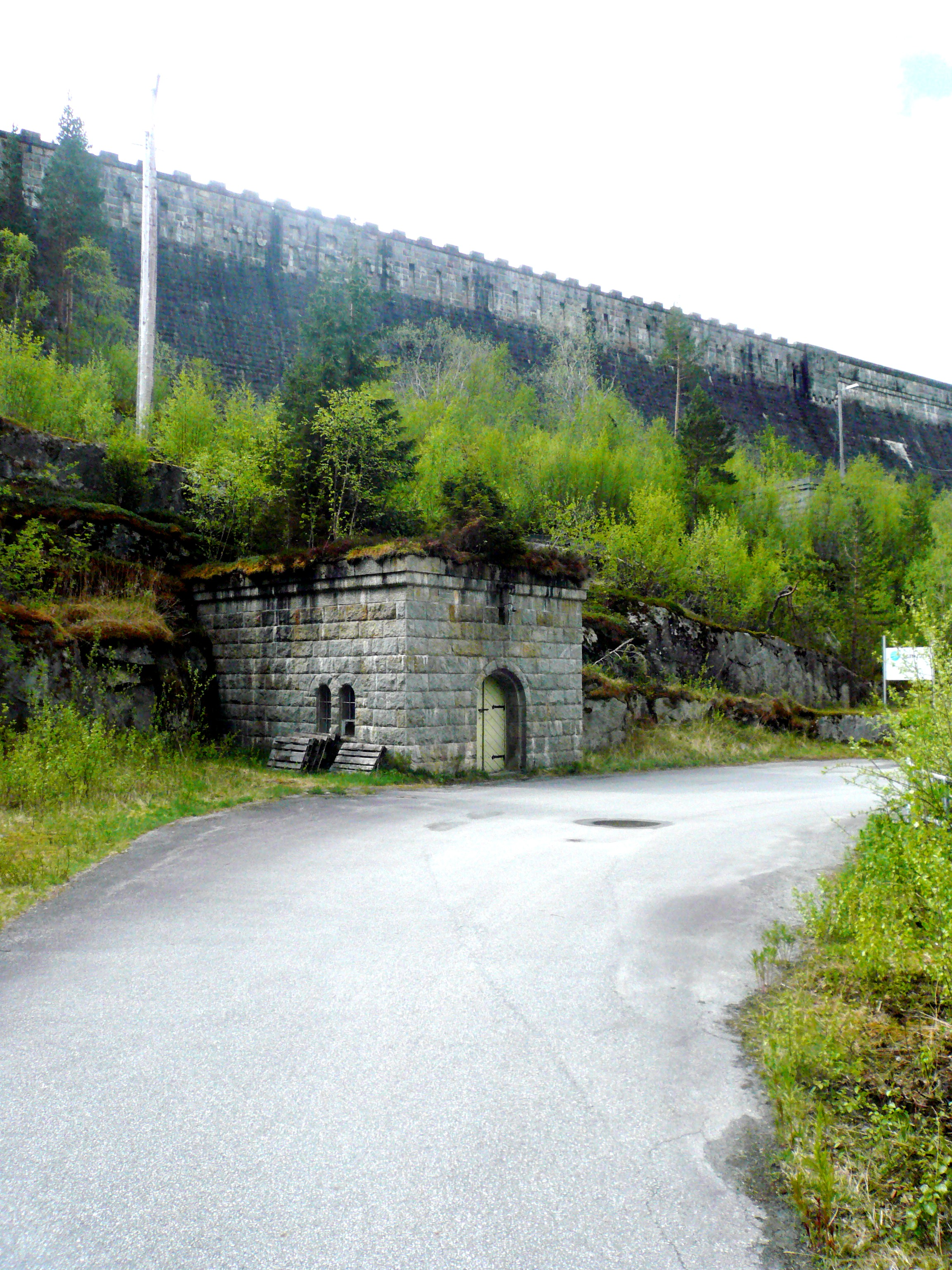
Ventilhus Schultstunnel Ringedalsdammen

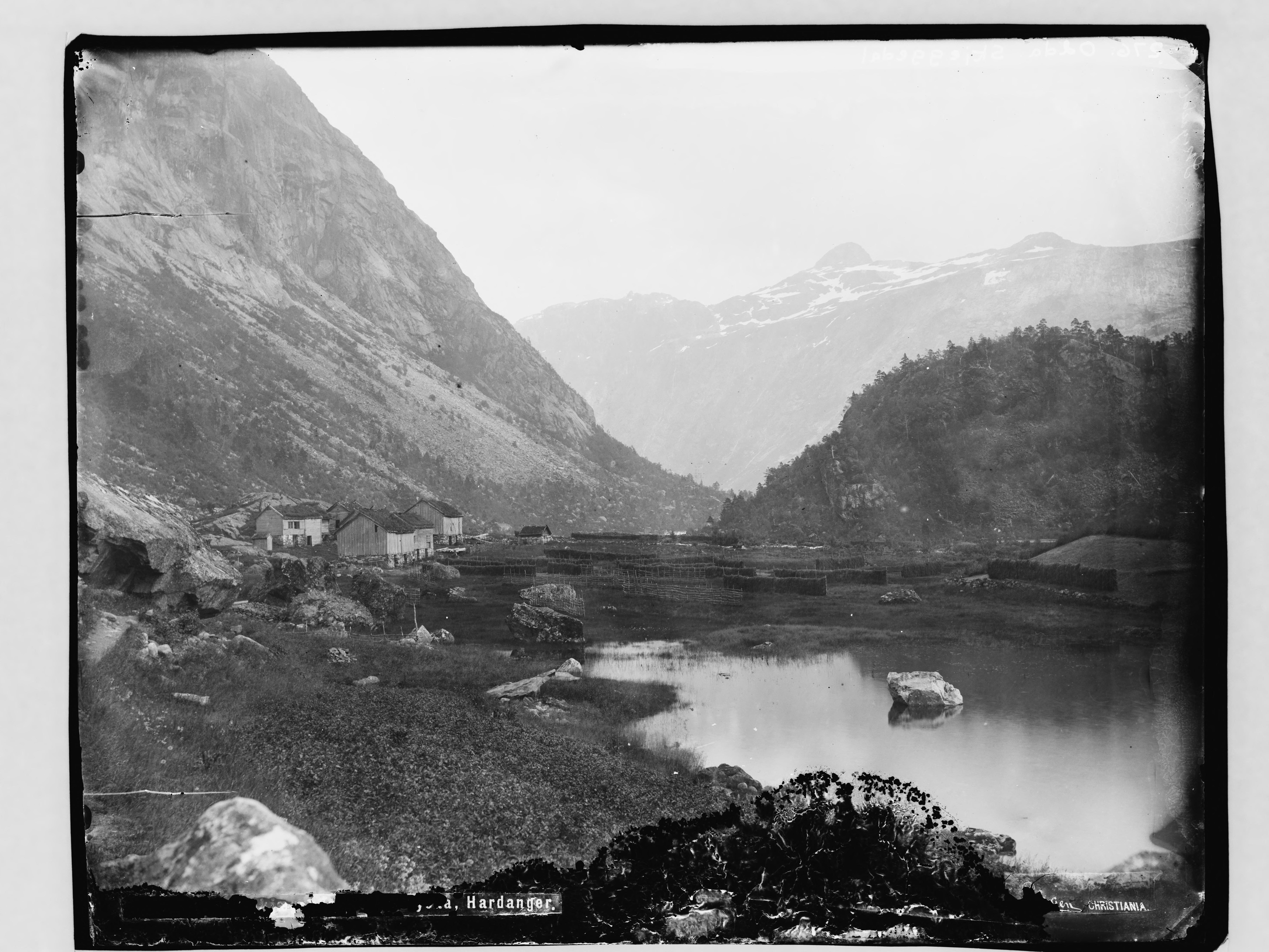
Skjeggedal (c. 1900)

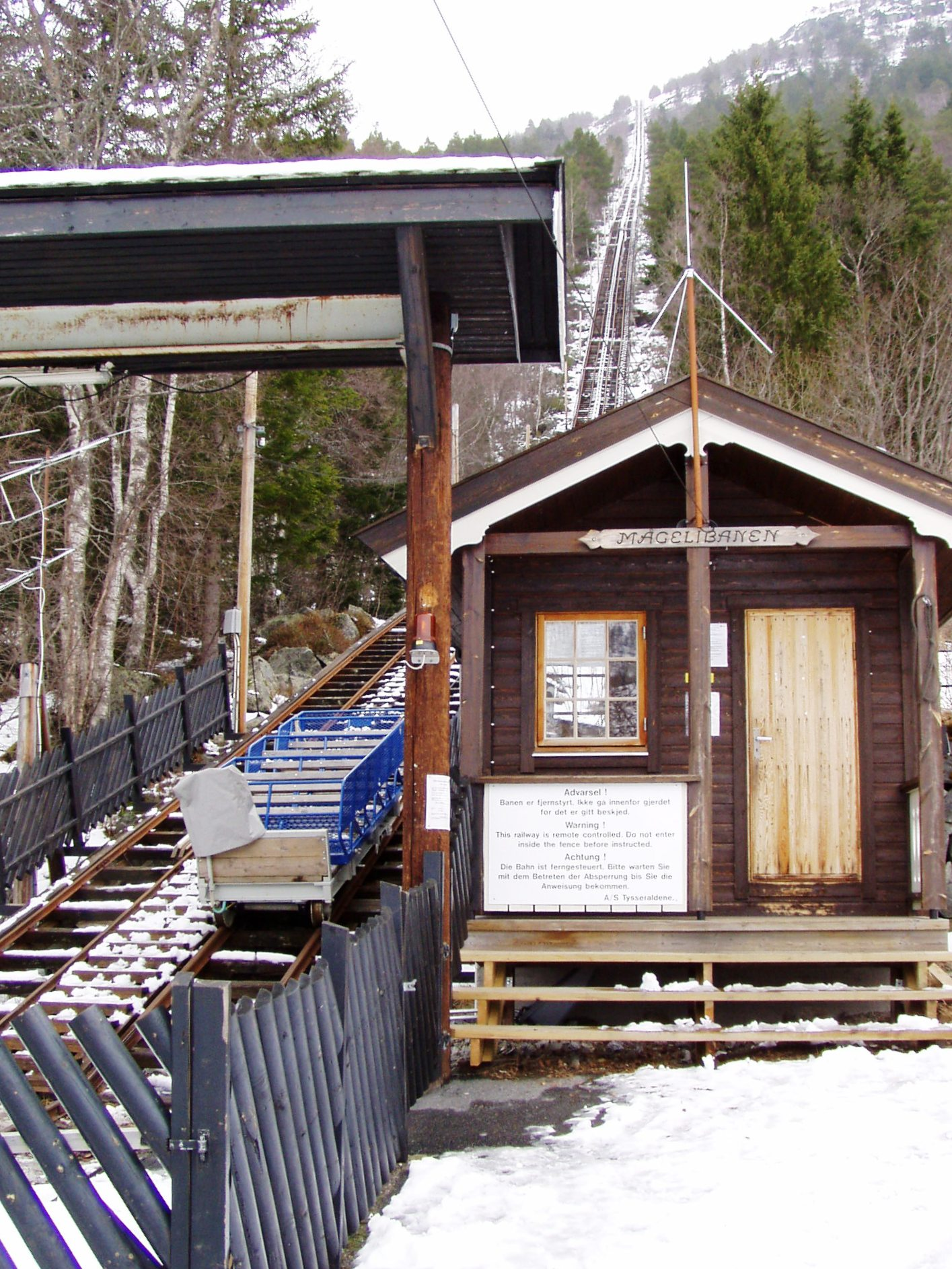
Mågeli railway leading up the mountain

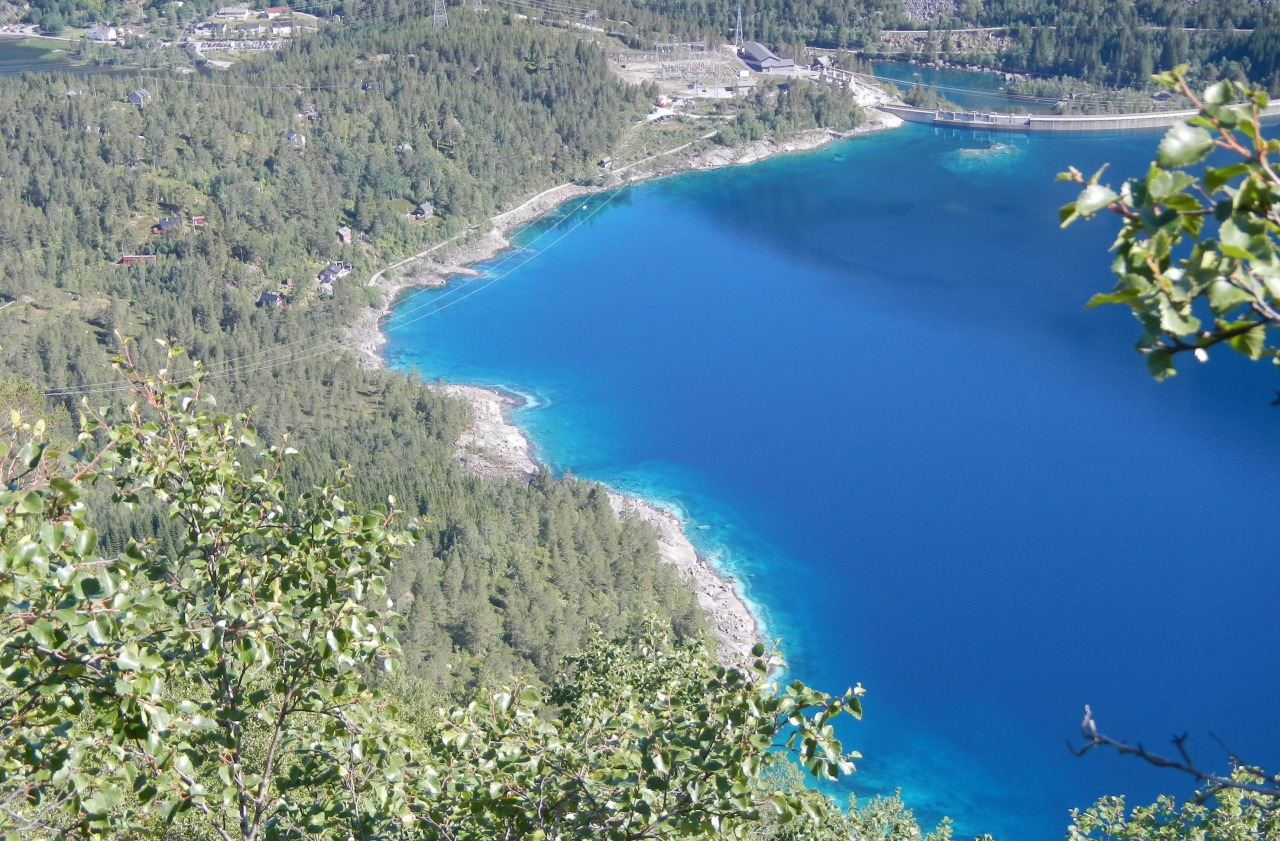
Ringedals Dam at Skjeggedal
