= Valldalsvatnet =

Lake in Vestland, Norway

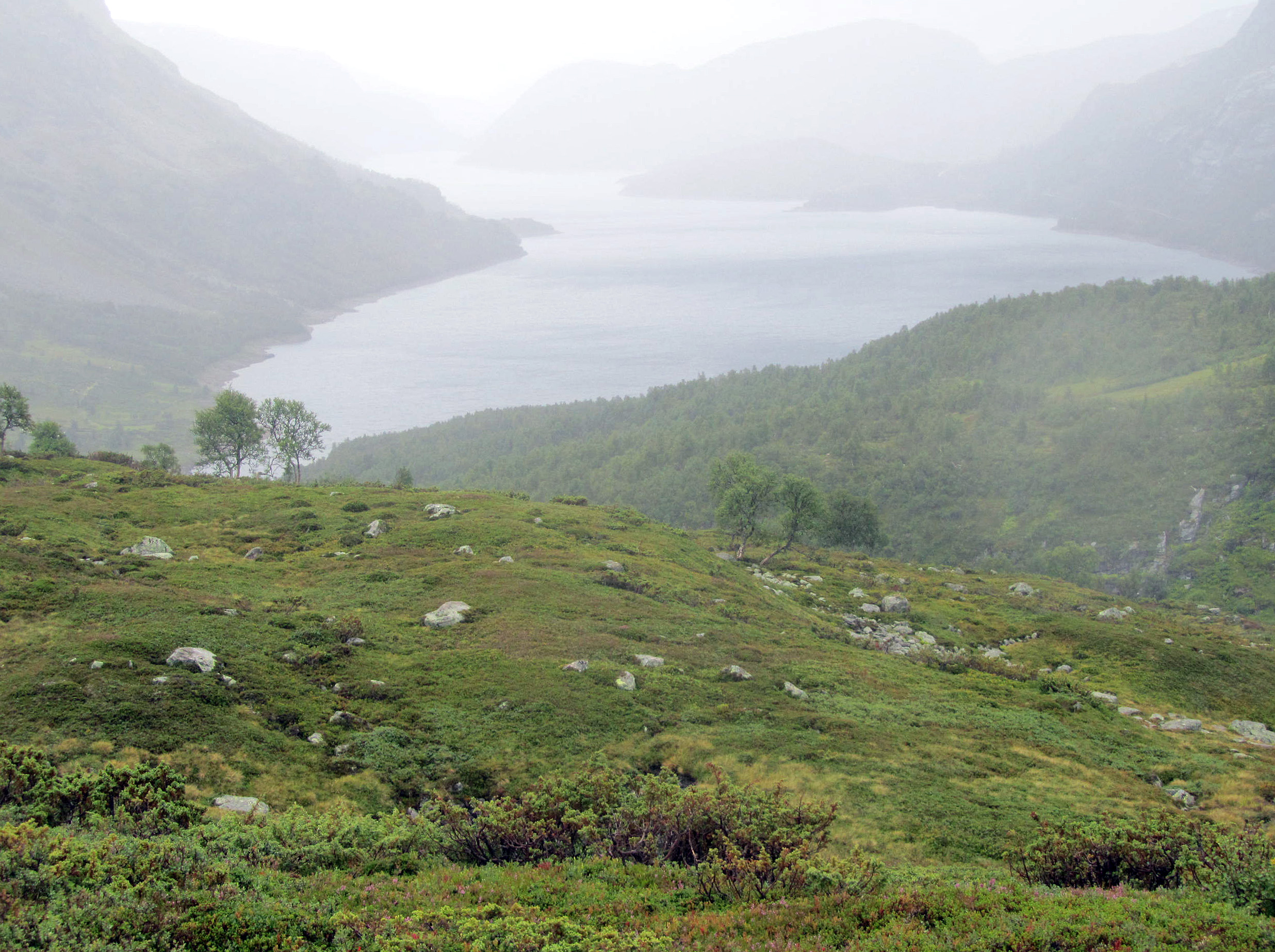
- View of the lake
- Interactive map of Valldalsvatnet
- Location: Ullensvang Municipality, Vestland
- Coordinates: 59.9166°N 6.9344°E
- Basin countries: Norway
- Max. length: 9.5 kilometres (5.9 mi)
- Max. width: 1.5 kilometres (0.93 mi)
- Surface area: 6.78 km^{2} (2.62 sq mi)
- Shore length^{1}: 24.32 kilometres (15.11 mi)
- Surface elevation: 745 metres (2,444 ft)
- References: NVE
- ^{1} Shore length is not a well-defined measure.

Valldalsvatnet is a lake in Ullensvang Municipality in Vestland county, Norway. The 6.78-square-kilometre (2.62 sq mi) lake lies about 6 kilometres (3.7 mi) northeast of the village of Røldal. The lake has a dam at the southern end, and it is used to regulate the water level for purposes of hydroelectric power generation. The lake was originally about 2.5 kilometres (1.6 mi) long and surrounded by many dairy farms. Since the 80-metre (260 ft) tall dam was built, the lake grew to about 10 kilometres (6.2 mi) long. This lake and the neighboring lakes of Votna and Røldalsvatnet are all regulated together as part of the Røldal-Suldal watershed which feeds a nearby hydroelectric power station.

== See also ==
- List of lakes in Norway
