= Håra =

Village in Ullensvang Municipality, Norway

Håra Horda (unofficial)
- Village
- Interactive map of Håra
- Coordinates: 59.81184°N 6.77068°E
- Country: Norway
- Region: Western Norway
- County: Vestland
- District: Hardanger
- Municipality: Ullensvang Municipality
- Elevation: 474 m (1,555 ft)
- Time zone: UTC+01:00 (CET)
  - Summer (DST): UTC+02:00 (CEST)
- Post Code: 5760 Røldal

Håra is a village in Ullensvang Municipality in Vestland county, Norway. The village is located in a small valley off the northwestern shore of the lake Røldalsvatnet. It is the location of the Håra Tunnel, a spiral tunnel through which the European route E134 highway and Norwegian National Road 13 pass. The larger village of Røldal lies about 3.5 kilometres (2.2 mi) to the northeast and the small village of Botnen lies about 7 kilometres (4.3 mi) to the south.
