= Espeland Falls =

Espeland Falls Espelandsfossen
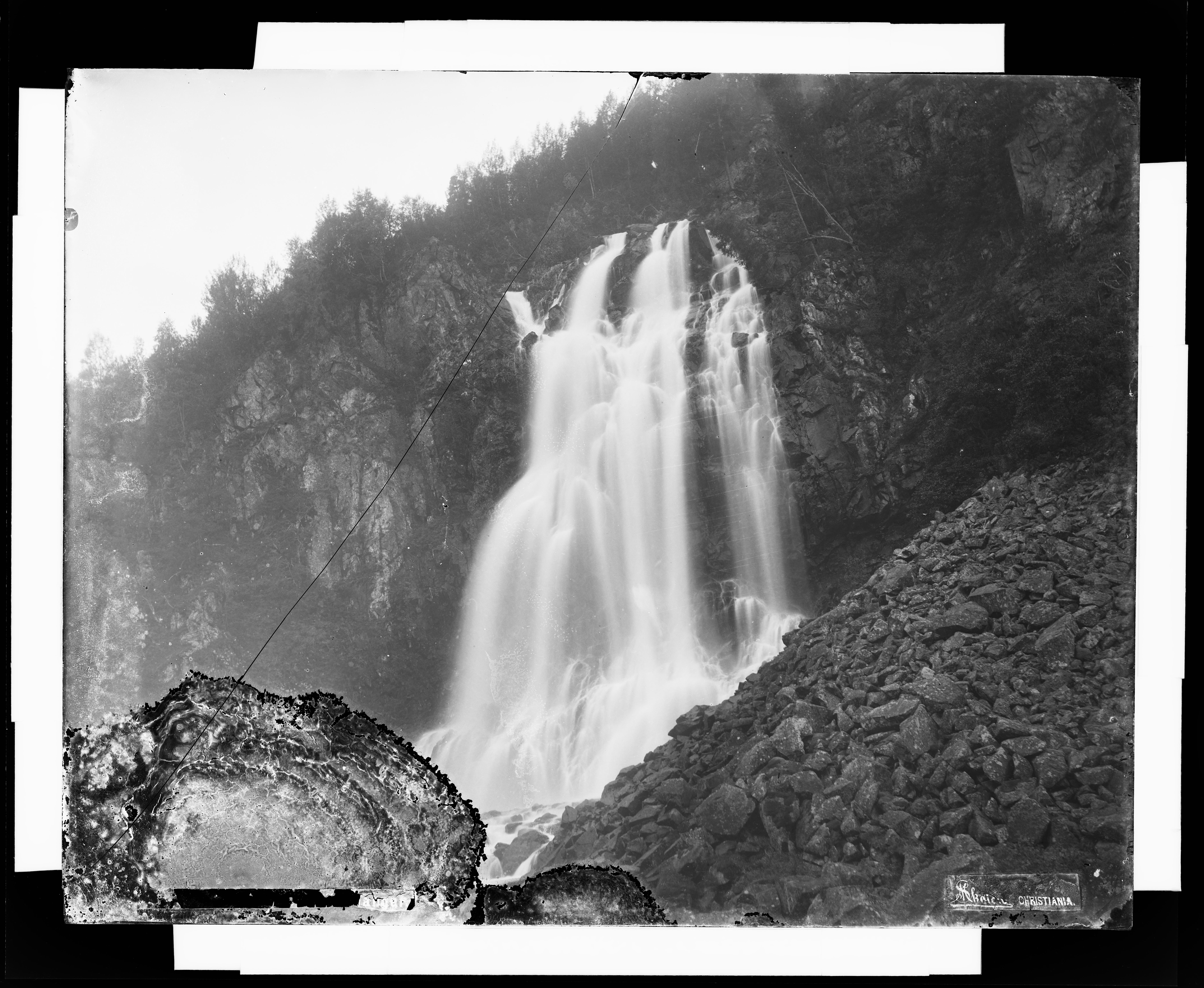
- View of the falls
- Interactive map of the area
- Location: Vestland, Norway
- Coordinates: 60.59807°N 6.82213°E
- Type: Tiered Horsetail
- Elevation: 415 metres (1,362 ft)
- Total height: 135 metres (443 ft)
- Number of drops: 2
- Longest drop: 90 metres (300 ft)
- Total width: 46 metres (151 ft)
- Average width: 24 metres (79 ft)
- Run: 46 metres (151 ft)
- Watercourse: Espelandselvi
- Average flow rate: 3 m^{3}/s (110 cu ft/s)

Espeland Falls (English) or Espelandsfossen (Norwegian) is a 135-metre (443 ft) tall waterfall located in the Espeland Valley (Norwegian: Espelandsdalen) in Voss Municipality in Vestland county, Norway. The falls are located just above large Lake Espeland (Norwegian: Espelandsvatnet), near the border of Voss Municipality and Ulvik Municipality.

Due to an urban legend, Espeland Falls is sometimes erroneously claimed to be 2,307 feet (703 m) tall. One theory is that the erroneous information may have originated from a misunderstanding of the concept meters of head in relation to the development of the Espeland River (Norwegian: Espelandselvi) for hydropower. Another theory is that there may have been a mixup with Skrikjofossen in Lofthus, Ullensvang Municipality, a 455-metre (1,493 ft) tall waterfall located about 60 kilometres (37 mi) south of Espeland Falls.

== See also ==
- List of waterfalls#Norway
