= Håra Tunnel =

Road tunnel in Norway

- Interactive map of Håra Tunnel

Overview
- Location: Vestland, Norway
- Coordinates: 59.8116°N 6.7657°E
- Status: In use
- Route: E134
- Start: Håra
- End: Håra

Operation
- Constructed: 1988
- Traffic: Automotive

Technical
- Length: 475 metres (1,558 ft)
- No. of lanes: 2
- Operating speed: 80km/h
- Grade: 7%

The Håra Tunnel (Norwegian: Håratunnelen) is a road tunnel in Ullensvang Municipality in Vestland county, Norway. The 475-metre (1,558 ft) long tunnel is in the village of Håra, located on the shore of the lake Røldalsvatnet. The tunnel is a spiral tunnel, turning almost a complete circle while continuously traversing a gradient of 7%. The tunnel was built to replace a narrow section of road that was made up of many hairpin turns.
