= Lutro =

Lutro is a Norwegian surname. Notable people with the surname include:

- Amalie Lutro (born 2000), Norwegian racing cyclist
- Einar Lutro (born 1943), Norwegian politician
