= Ullensvang Church =

Church in Vestland, Norway

- Ullensvang kyrkje
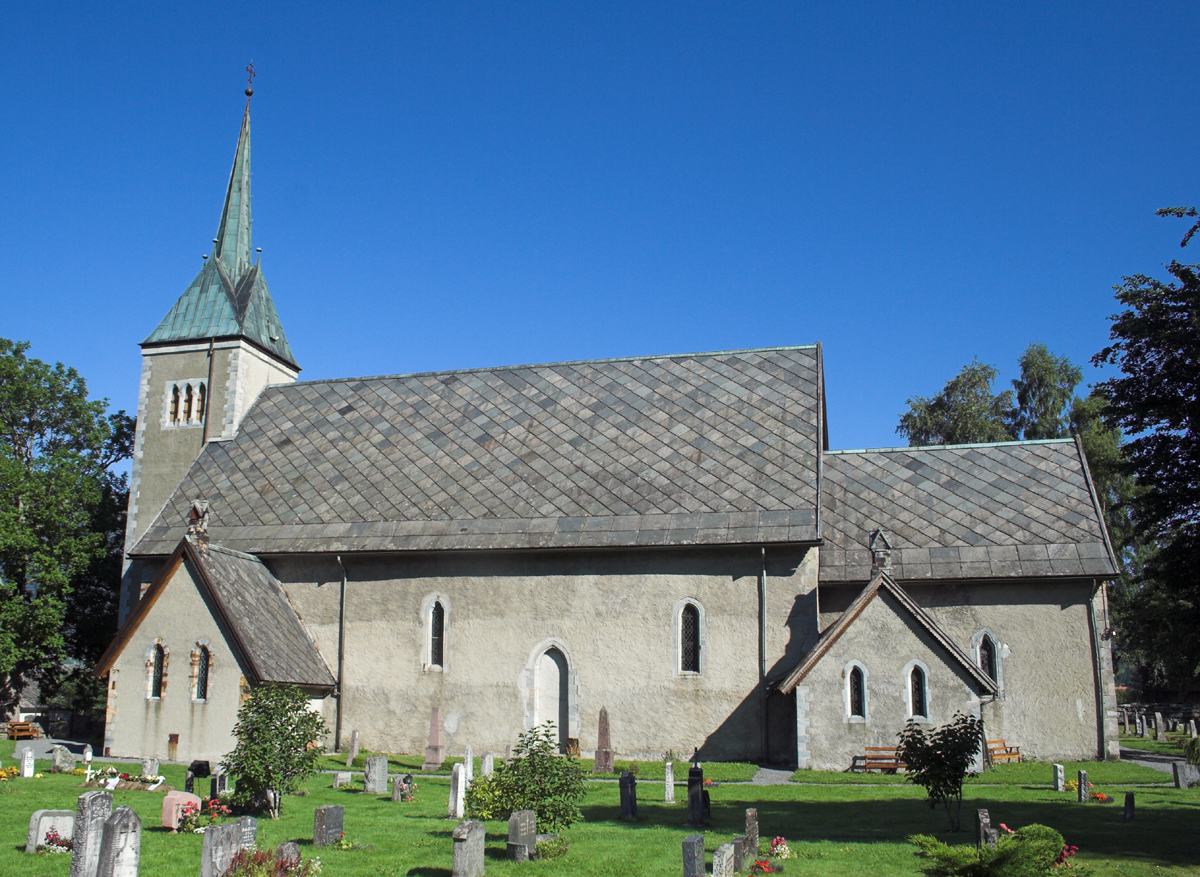
- View of the church
- Ullensvang Church
- 60°19′10″N 6°39′12″E
- Location: Ullensvang, Vestland
- Country: Norway
- Denomination: Church of Norway
- Previous denomination: Catholic Church
- Churchmanship: Evangelical Lutheran

History
- Status: Parish church
- Founded: 13th century
- Consecrated: 13th century

Architecture
- Functional status: Active
- Architectural type: Long church
- Completed: c. 1250 (776 years ago)

Specifications
- Capacity: 350
- Materials: Stone

Administration
- Diocese: Bjørgvin bispedømme
- Deanery: Hardanger og Voss prosti
- Parish: Ullensvang
- Norwegian Cultural Heritage Site
- Type: Church
- Status: Automatically protected
- ID: 85715

Ullensvang Church (Norwegian: Ullensvang kyrkje) is a parish church of the Church of Norway in Ullensvang Municipality in Vestland county, Norway. It is located in the village of Lofthus. It is the church for the Ullensvang parish which is part of the Hardanger og Voss prosti (deanery) in the Diocese of Bjørgvin. The large stone church was built in a long church design around the year 1250 using plans drawn up by an unknown architect. The church seats about 350 people.

The church was built in the 13th century and has been remodeled and expanded several times over the centuries. Colloquially, the church is known as the Hardangerdomen (lit. 'Hardanger Dome') due to its size, history, and central location in the Hardanger region of the county.

== History ==
The area of Ullensvang is named after the old pagan god Ullin. Ullensvang is thus an old name. It is reasonable to surmise that Ullensvang was a religious gathering place before the time of Christianity in Norway. When Christianity came to the area, it is likely that a church was built here where the old temple had stood. The earliest existing historical records of Ullensvang Church date back to the year 1309, but it was not new that year. It is likely that the stone church was built during the 13th century. Legend has it that the church was built by people from Scotland. Originally, the church had a rectangular nave with a narrower, rectangular chancel and no tower.

In 1814, this church served as an election church (Norwegian: valgkirke). Together with more than 300 other parish churches across Norway, it was a polling station for elections to the 1814 Norwegian Constituent Assembly which wrote the Constitution of Norway. This was Norway's first national elections. Each church parish was a constituency that elected people called "electors" who later met together in each county to elect the representatives for the assembly that was to meet at Eidsvoll Manor later that year.

Between 1883 and 1885 during an expansion and renovation led by the architect Christian Christie. During the renovation, the nave was extended to the west by one-third of its size and a new tower was built. A sacristy, office, and stairwell were also built on the north and south sides of the church. In 1958, the church was restored by the architect Arnstein Arneberg. Much of the neo-Gothic interior from the 1870s was then taken away and the interior redecorated as it was during the 17th century. Also, the walls were repainted and the nave ceiling was vaulted.

== Media gallery ==
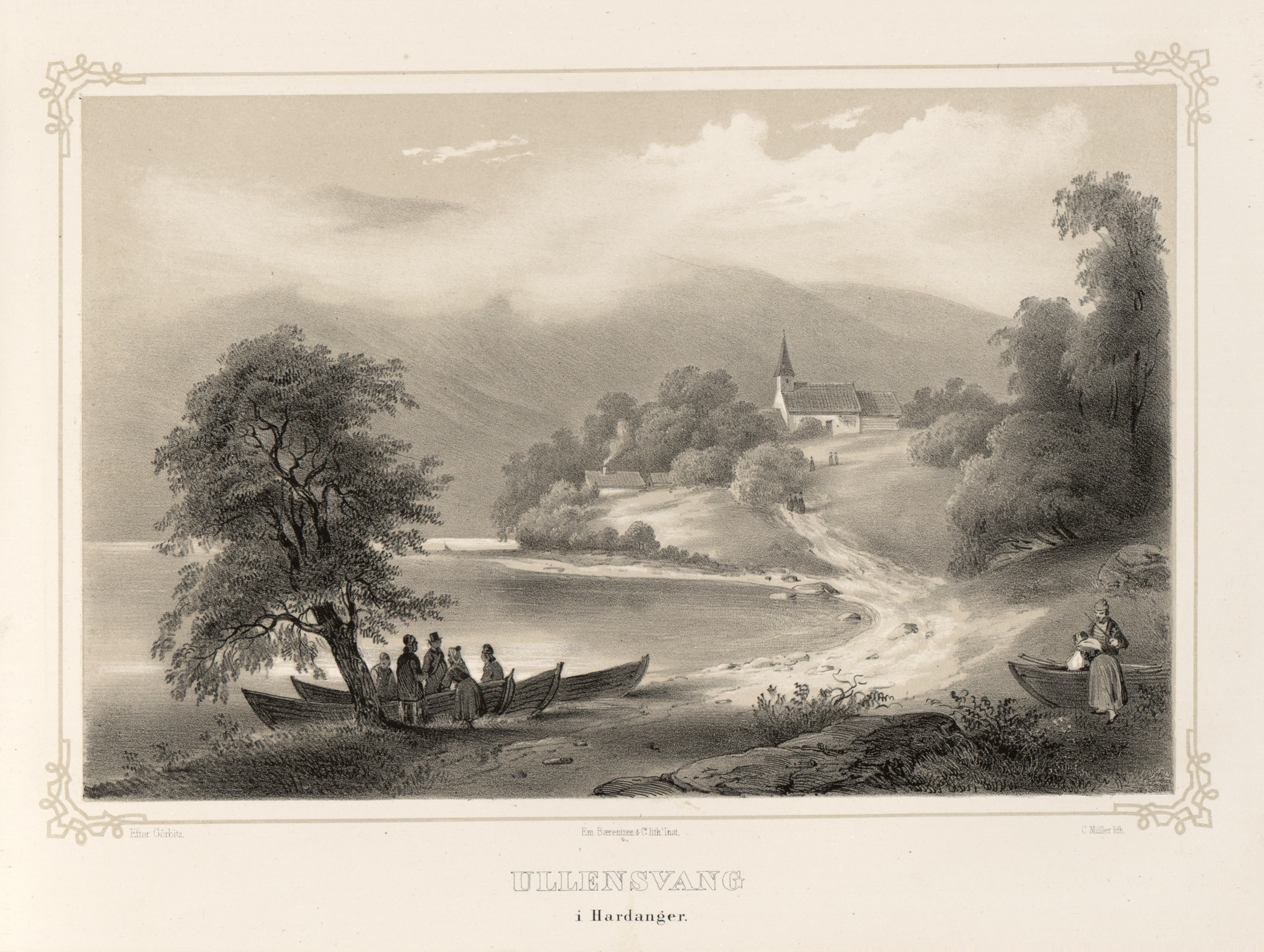
Old drawing of the church

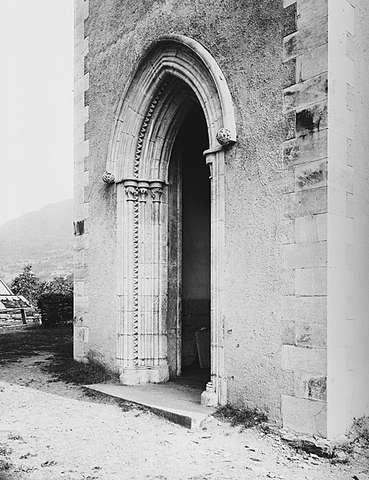
Main entrance to the church

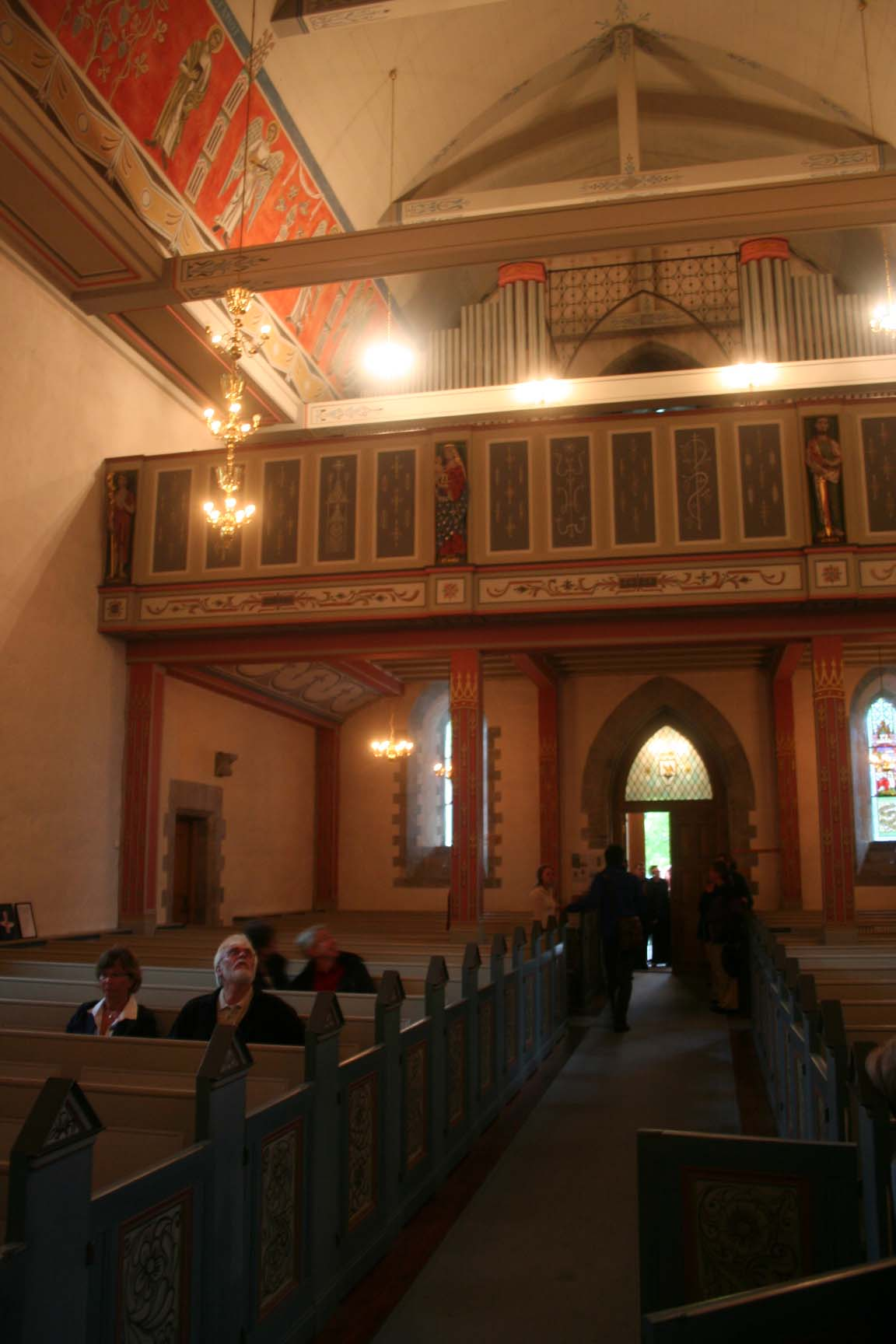
Interior of the church (looking towards the back)

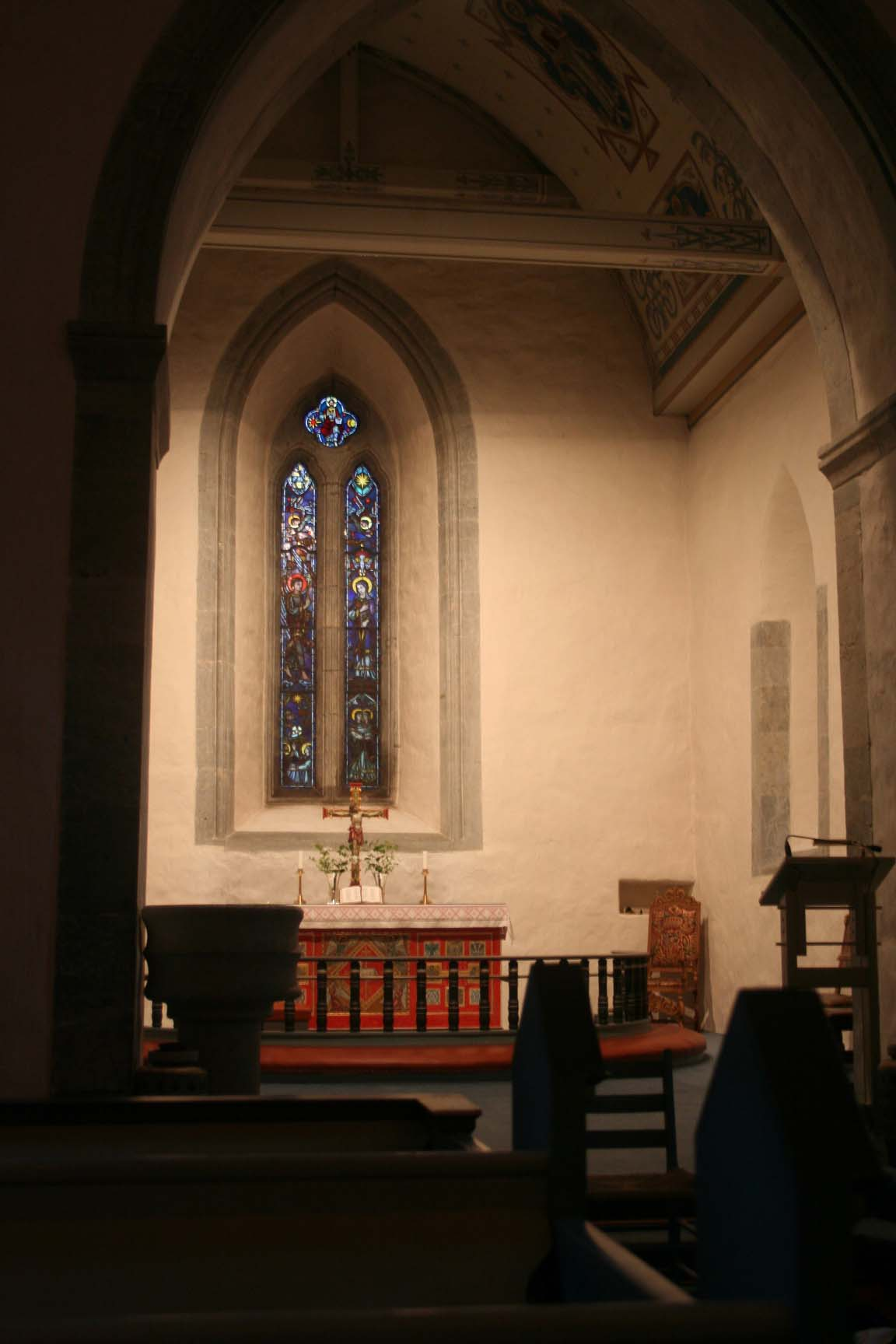
Interior of the church (looking towards the front)

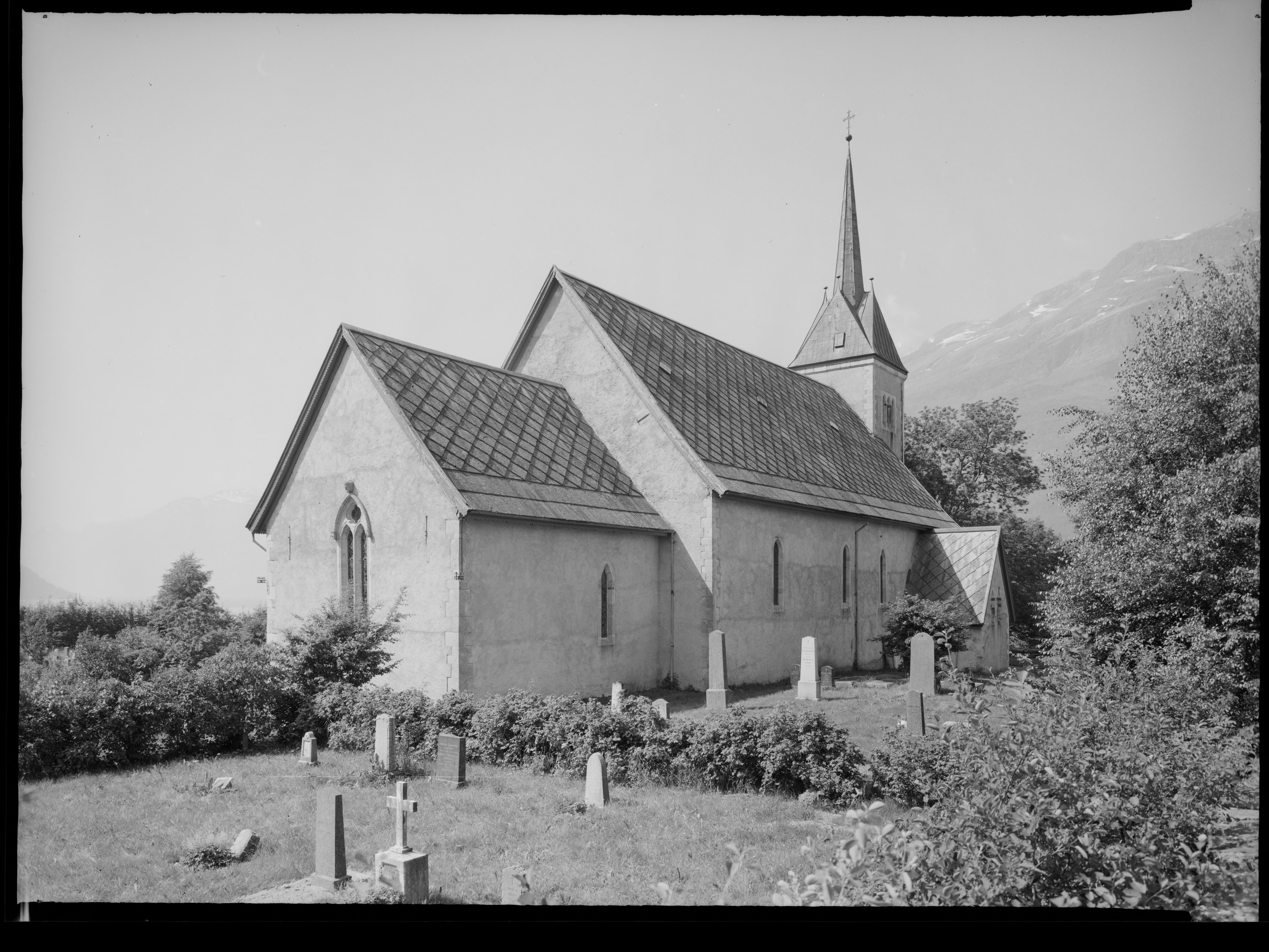
Exterior rear view (bef. 1960)

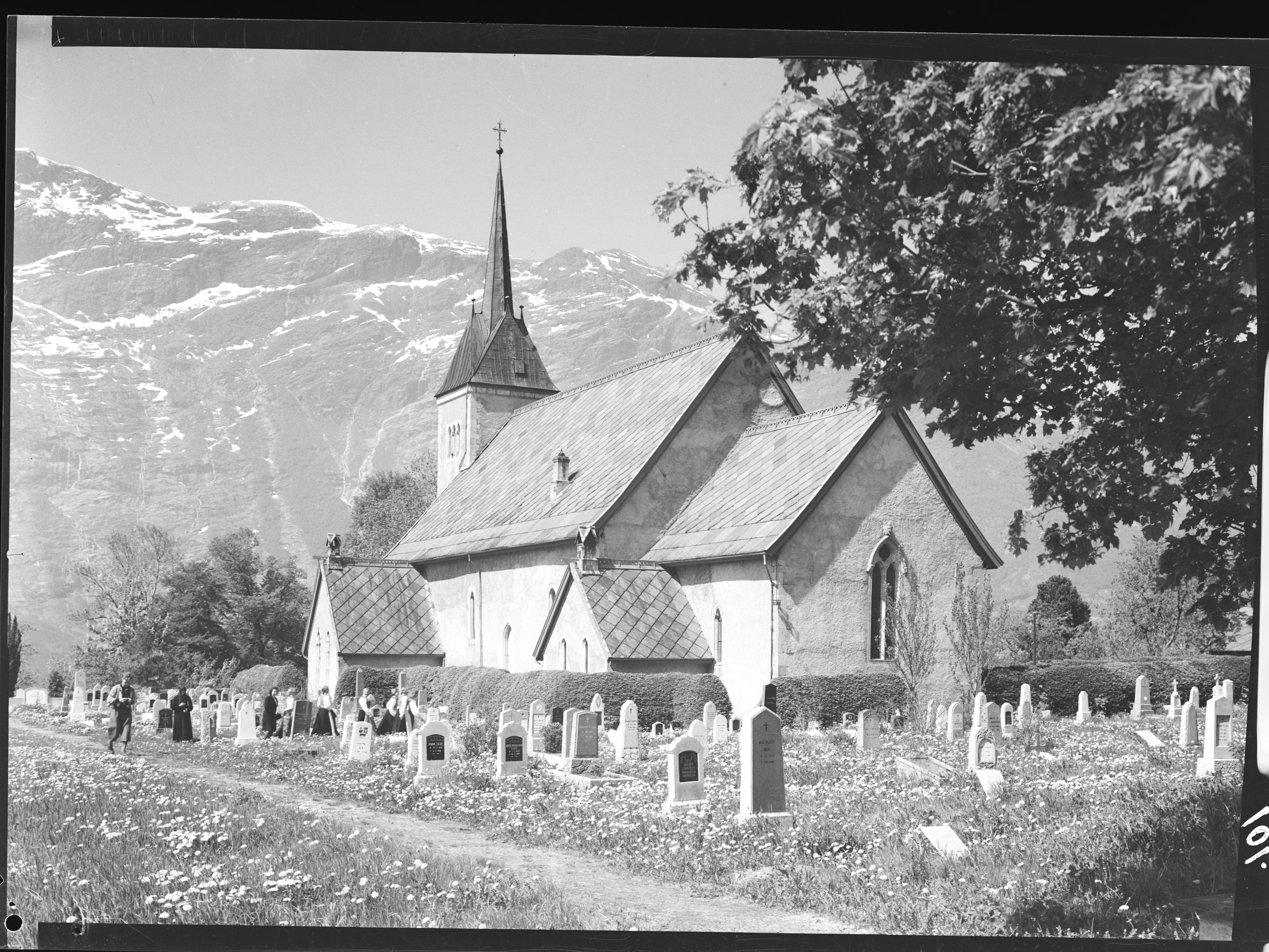
Side exterior view (c. 1950)

== See also ==
- List of churches in Bjørgvin
