= Botnen, Ullensvang =

Village in Ullensvang Municipality, Norway

Botnen
- Village
- Interactive map of Botnen
- Coordinates: 59.75316°N 6.79544°E
- Country: Norway
- Region: Western Norway
- County: Vestland
- District: Hardanger
- Municipality: Ullensvang Municipality
- Elevation: 401 m (1,316 ft)

Population
  - Total: 0
- Time zone: UTC+01:00 (CET)
  - Summer (DST): UTC+02:00 (CEST)
- Post Code: 5760 Røldal

Botnen is a village in Ullensvang Municipality in Vestland county, Norway. There are no people currently living in the village. The village is located at the southern end of the lake Røldalsvatnet. The Norwegian National Road 13 passes through the village, connecting it to the village of Røldal to the north and to the village of Nesflaten (in Suldal Municipality, Rogaland county) to the south.

Historically, the village was part of the old Røldal Municipality.
