= Votna =

Lake in Vestland, Norway

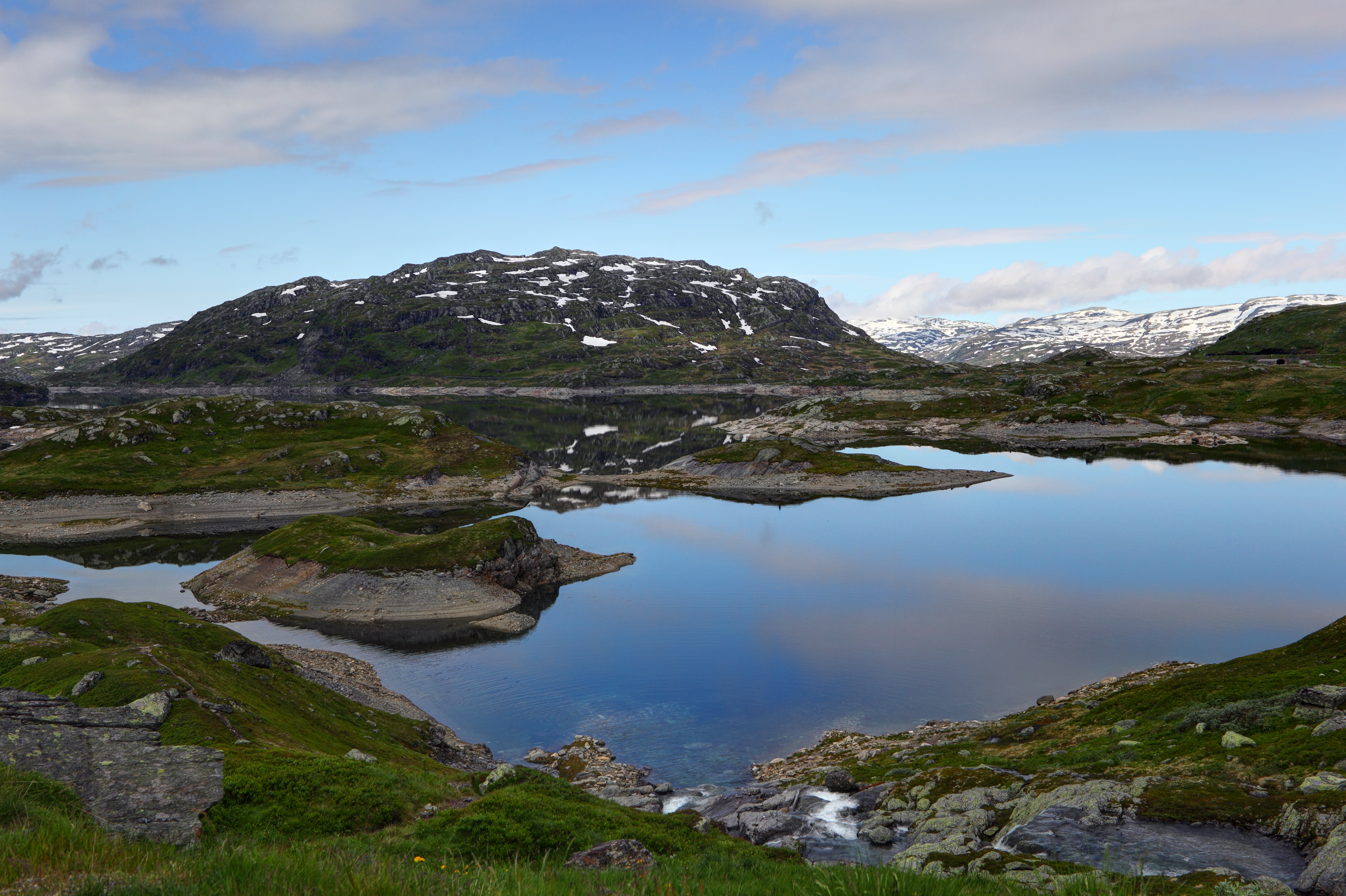
- A view to the lake Votna
- Interactive map of Votna
- Location: Ullensvang Municipality, Vestland
- Coordinates: 59.8393°N 6.9395°E
- Basin countries: Norway
- Max. length: 5.4 kilometres (3.4 mi)
- Max. width: 1.2 kilometres (0.75 mi)
- Surface area: 4.6 km^{2} (1.8 sq mi)
- Shore length^{1}: 17.51 kilometres (10.88 mi)
- Surface elevation: 1,020 metres (3,350 ft)
- References: NVE
- ^{1} Shore length is not a well-defined measure.

Votna is a lake in Ullensvang Municipality in Vestland county, Norway. The 4.6-square-kilometre (1.8 sq mi) lake lies about 4 kilometres (2.5 mi) straight east of the village of Røldal. The European route E134 highway runs along the northern part of the lake. There is a dam on the southwest end of the lake which regulates the level of the lake for purposes of hydroelectric power generation.

== Climate ==
Climate data for Midtlæger 1991-2020 normals (1081m)
Month	Jan	Feb	Mar	Apr	May	Jun	Jul	Aug	Sep	Oct	Nov	Dec	Year
Mean daily maximum °C (°F)	−3.2 (26.2)	−2.9 (26.8)	−1.1 (30.0)	3.0 (37.4)	6.2 (43.2)	10.0 (50.0)	13.4 (56.1)	12.2 (54.0)	8.4 (47.1)	3.4 (38.1)	0.4 (32.7)	−2.4 (27.7)	3.9 (39.1)
Daily mean °C (°F)	−5.5 (22.1)	−5.4 (22.3)	−3.9 (25.0)	0.0 (32.0)	3.3 (37.9)	6.9 (44.4)	10.3 (50.5)	9.5 (49.1)	6.2 (43.2)	1.3 (34.3)	−1.7 (28.9)	−4.6 (23.7)	1.4 (34.4)
Mean daily minimum °C (°F)	−7.7 (18.1)	−7.8 (18.0)	−6.7 (19.9)	−2.9 (26.8)	0.4 (32.7)	3.6 (38.5)	7.1 (44.8)	6.8 (44.2)	3.9 (39.0)	−0.8 (30.6)	−3.8 (25.2)	−6.8 (19.8)	−1.2 (29.8)
Average precipitation mm (inches)	88.5 (3.48)	70.3 (2.77)	74.0 (2.91)	52.8 (2.08)	55.3 (2.18)	77.3 (3.04)	90.2 (3.55)	88.7 (3.49)	98.7 (3.89)	89.4 (3.52)	85.5 (3.37)	86.5 (3.41)	957.2 (37.69)
Source: MeteoClimat

== See also ==
- List of lakes in Norway
