= Låtefossen =

Låtefossen Låtefoss
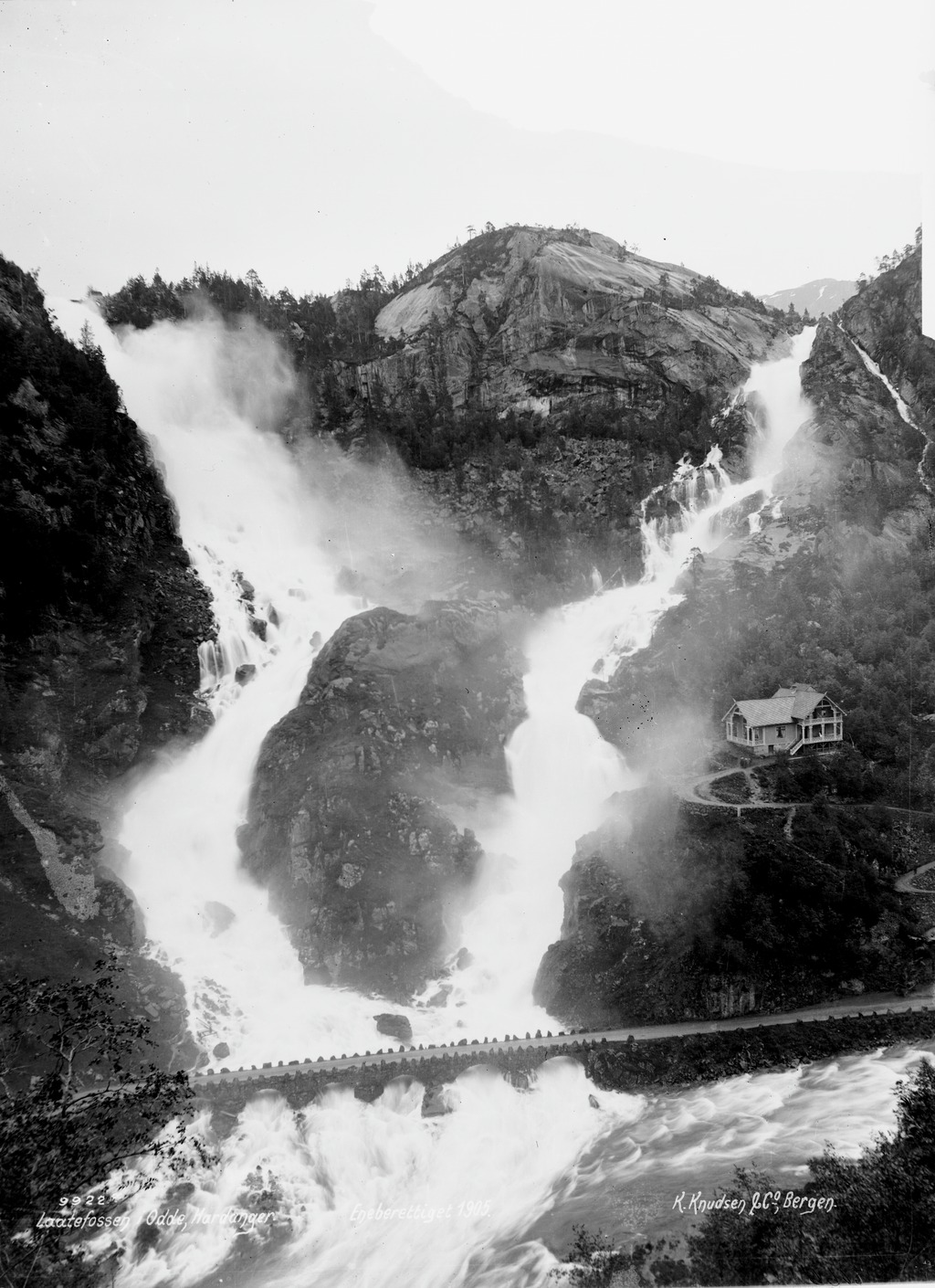
- The two joining streams Photo: Knud Knudsen, around 1900
- Interactive map of Låtefossen; Låtefoss
- Location: Vestland, Norway
- Coordinates: 59.948359°N 6.588498°E
- Type: Segmented Steep Cascade
- Elevation: 335 metres (1,099 ft)
- Total height: 165 metres (541 ft)
- Number of drops: 1
- Longest drop: 52 metres (171 ft)
- Average width: 23 metres (75 ft)
- Run: 274 metres (899 ft)
- Watercourse: Austdølo
- Average flow rate: 17 cubic metres per second (600 cu ft/s)

Låtefossen is a waterfall located in Ullensvang Municipality in Vestland County, Norway. The 165-metre (541 ft) tall waterfall is unique and thus it is a well-known tourist attraction in the area. It is special in that it consists of two separate streams flowing down from the lake Lotevatnet, and as they fall, they join in the middle of the waterfall, just before going under the Norwegian National Road 13 built in 1867–69, making for a spectacular (and wet) view as one drives over the old, stone, six-arched bridge.

== Gallery ==
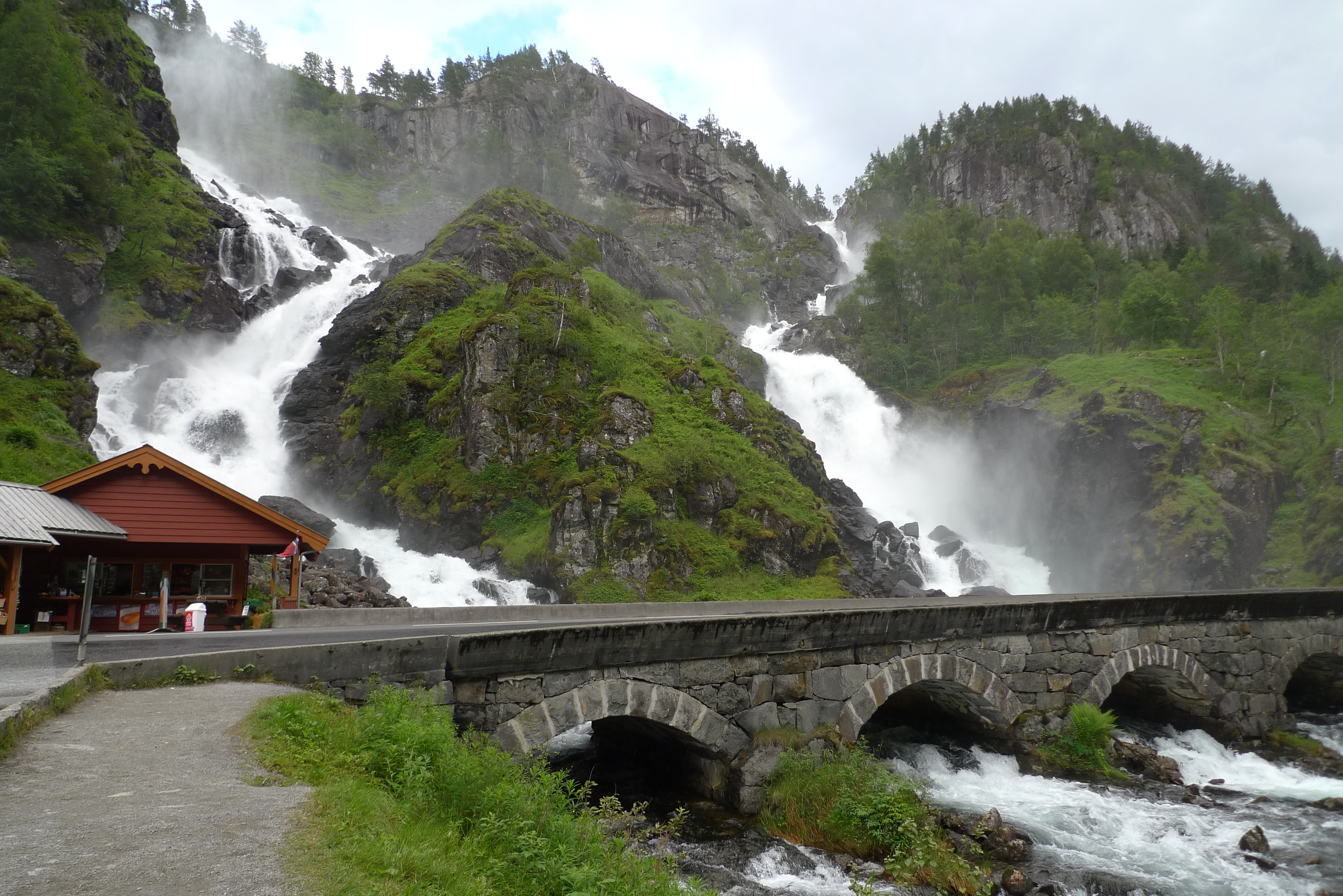
View of the bridge

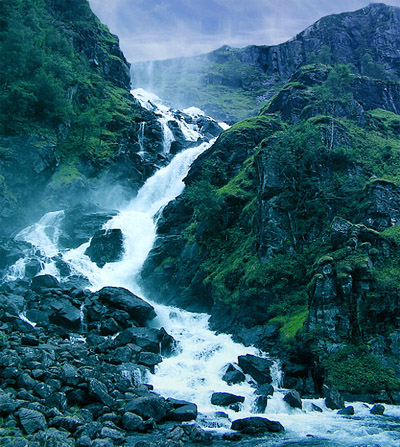
Section from Låtefossen

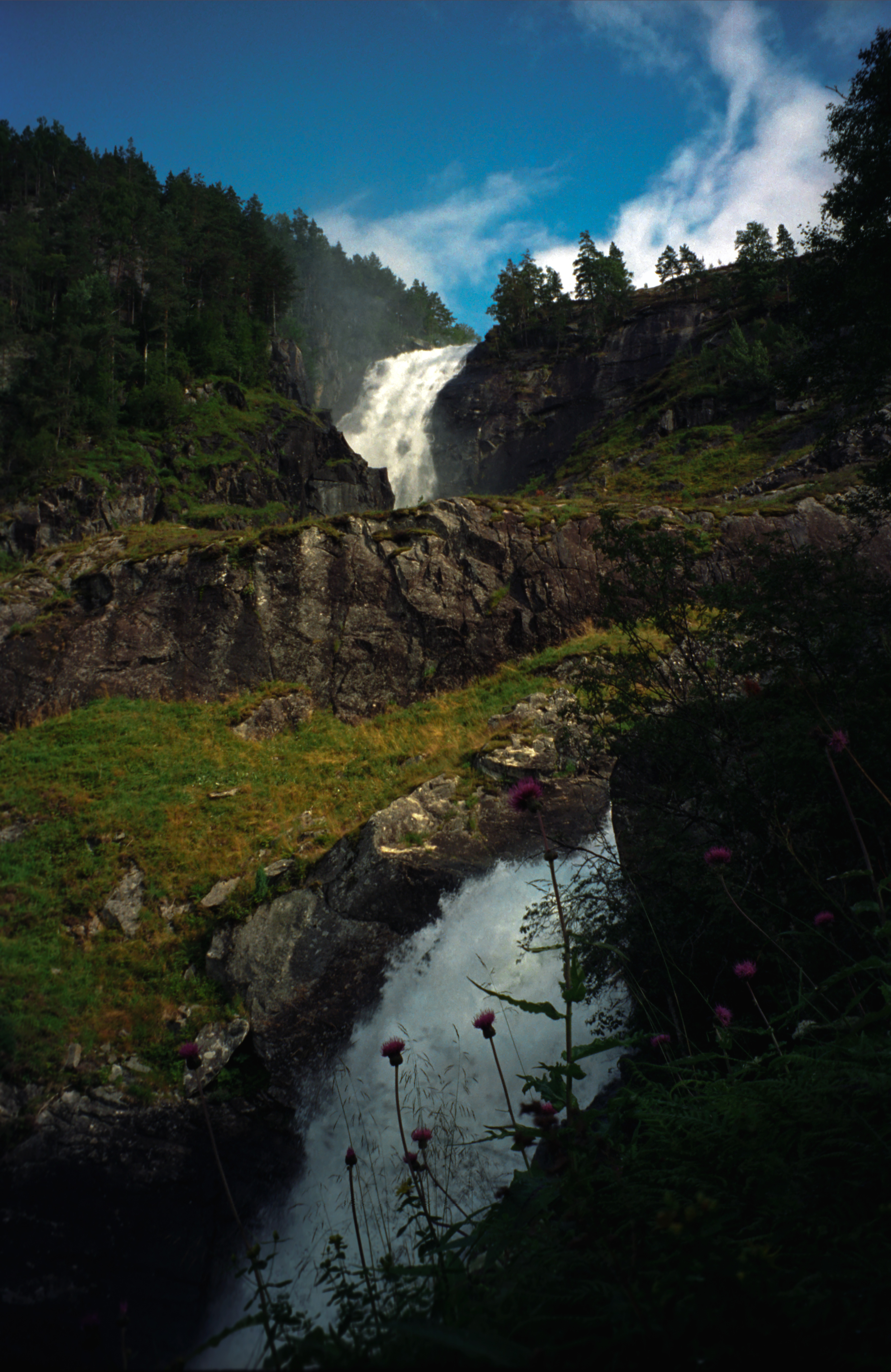
View of the falls

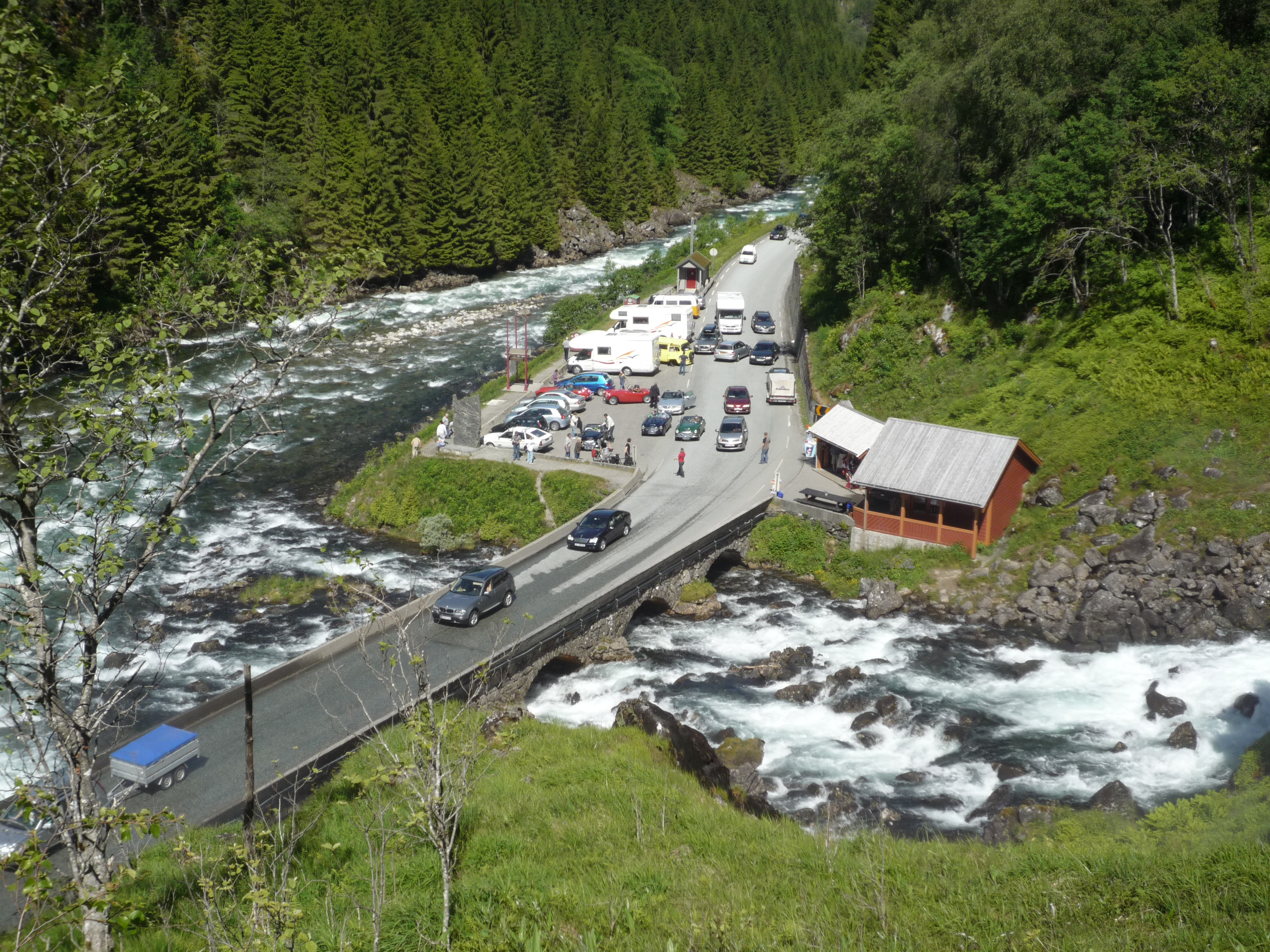
View of the visitors' center

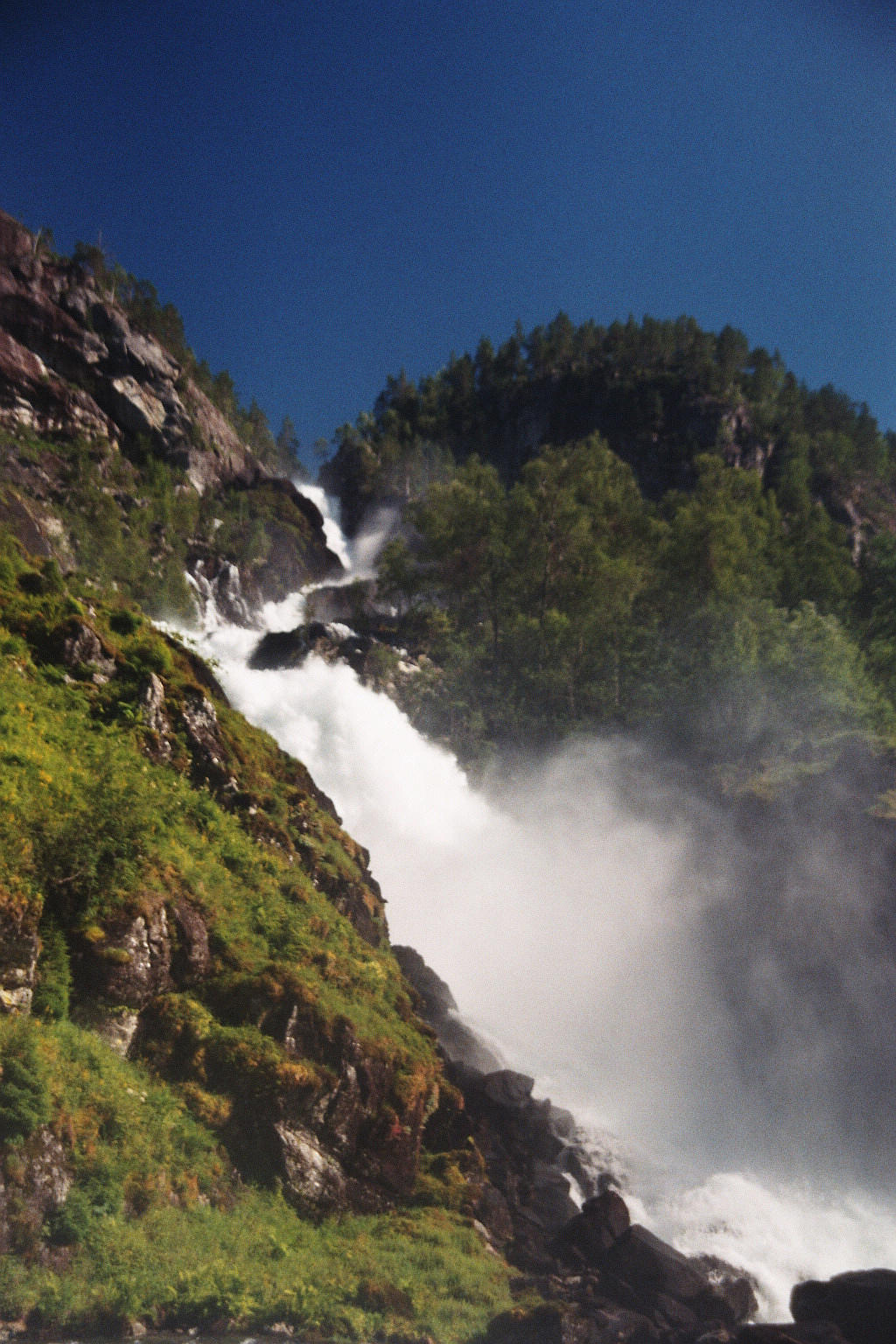

== See also ==
- List of waterfalls § Norway
- Media related to Låtefossen at Wikimedia Commons
