= Veivatnet =

Lake in Vestland, Norway

- Interactive map of Veivatnet
- Location: Ullensvang Municipality, Vestland
- Coordinates: 60.2428°N 6.9292°E
- Basin countries: Norway
- Max. length: 4.8 kilometres (3.0 mi)
- Max. width: 1.8 kilometres (1.1 mi)
- Surface area: 4.64 km^{2} (1.79 sq mi)
- Shore length^{1}: 1,172 kilometres (728 mi)
- Surface elevation: 17.33 metres (56.9 ft)
- References: NVE
- ^{1} Shore length is not a well-defined measure.

Veivatnet is a lake in Ullensvang Municipality in Vestland county, Norway. The 4.64-square-kilometre (1.79 sq mi) lake lies on the vast Hardangervidda plateau, inside Hardangervidda National Park. It is located about 15 kilometres (9.3 mi) southeast of the village of Lofthus and about 30 kilometres (19 mi) northeast of the town of Odda.

== See also ==
- List of lakes in Norway
