= Kvennsjøen =

Lake in Vestland, Norway

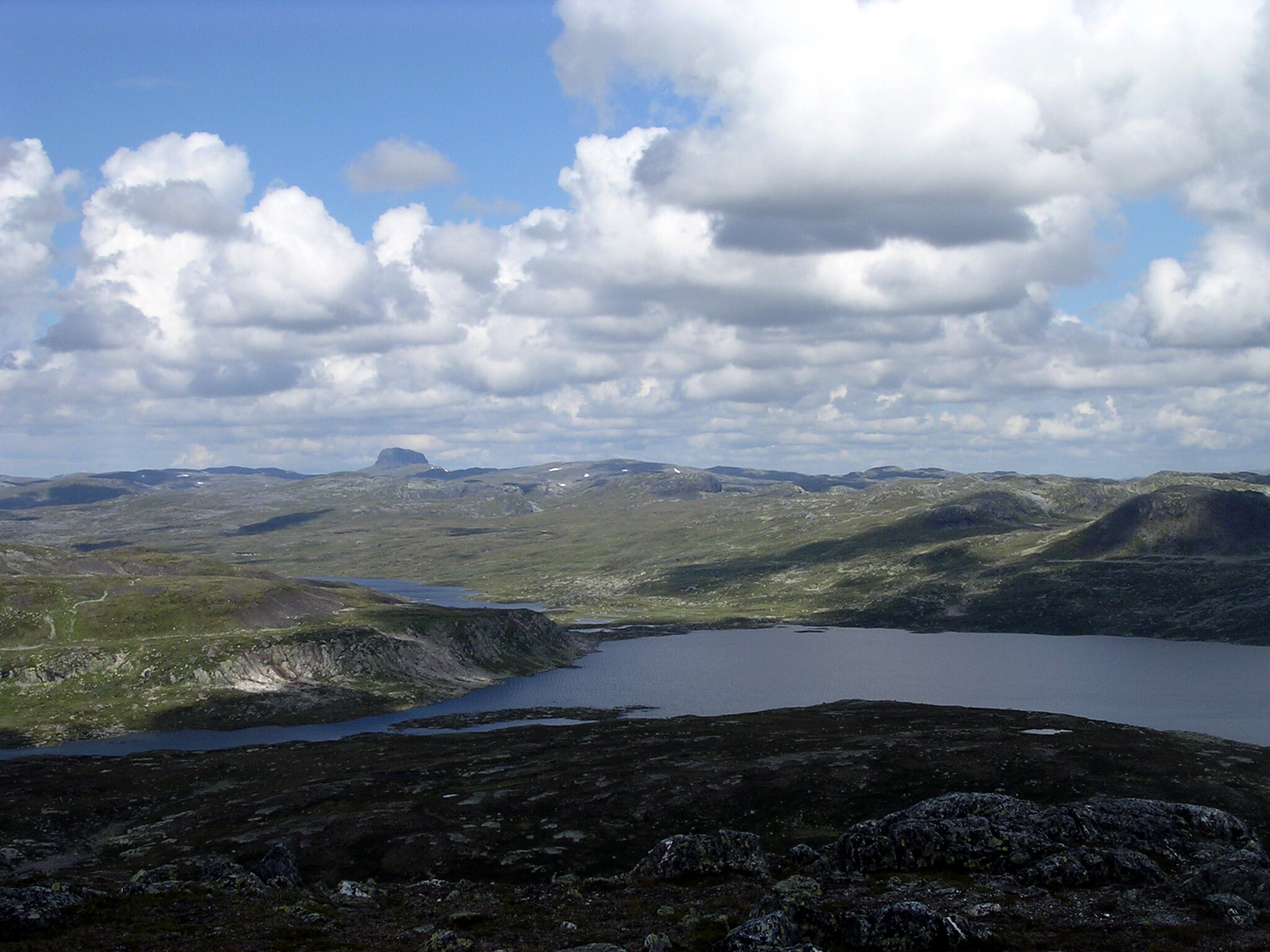
- Interactive map of Kvennsjøen
- Location: Ullensvang Municipality, Vestland
- Coordinates: 60.0647°N 7.1926°E
- Basin countries: Norway
- Max. length: 5.3 kilometres (3.3 mi)
- Max. width: 2.2 kilometres (1.4 mi)
- Surface area: 5.05 km^{2} (1.95 sq mi)
- Shore length^{1}: 18.62 kilometres (11.57 mi)
- Surface elevation: 1,167 metres (3,829 ft)
- References: NVE
- ^{1} Shore length is not a well-defined measure.

Kvennsjøen is a lake in Ullensvang Municipality in Vestland county, Norway. The 5.05-square-kilometre (1.95 sq mi) lake lies on the Hardangervidda plateau, inside the Hardangervidda National Park. The alpine lake is located 35 kilometres (22 mi) straight east of the town of Odda and about 45 kilometres (28 mi) south of the village of Eidfjord. There are over 500 lakes in Ullensvang Municipality and this one is the largest of all of them.

== See also ==
- List of lakes in Norway
