= Ullensvang Municipality =

Municipality in Vestland, Norway

Ullensvang Municipality Ullensvang kommune
- Municipality
- Ullensvang herad (historic name); Kinservik herred (historic name)
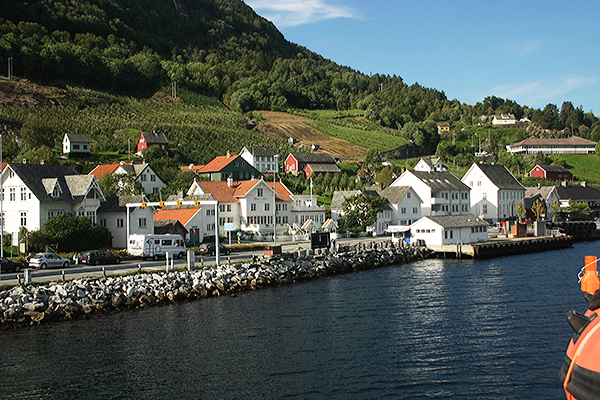
- View of Utne in Ullensvang

- Coat of arms

- Vestland within Norway

- Ullensvang within Vestland
- Coordinates: 60°18′42″N 06°48′53″E
- Country: Norway
- County: Vestland
- District: Hardanger
- Established: 1 Jan 1838
  - Created as: Formannskapsdistrikt
- Administrative centre: Odda

Government
  - Mayor (2019): Roald Aga Haug (Ap)

Area
  - Total: 3,229.90 km^{2} (1,247.07 sq mi)
  - Land: 2,962.43 km^{2} (1,143.80 sq mi)
  - Water: 267.47 km^{2} (103.27 sq mi) 8.3%
  - Rank: #12 in Norway
- Highest elevation: 1,721.26 m (5,647.2 ft)

Population (2025)
  - Total: 10,981
  - Rank: #107 in Norway
  - Density: 3.4/km^{2} (8.8/sq mi)
  - Change (10 years): ▼ −3.9%
- Demonym(s): Sørfjøre; Sørfjording

Official language
  - Norwegian form: Nynorsk
- Time zone: UTC+01:00 (CET)
  - Summer (DST): UTC+02:00 (CEST)
- ISO 3166 code: NO-4618
- Website: Official website

Ullensvang is a municipality in Vestland county, Norway. It is located in the traditional district of Hardanger. The administrative centre is the town of Odda. Some of the notable villages in the municipality include Lofthus, Utne, Vikebygd, Alsåker, Botnen, Eitrheim, Håra, Røldal, Seljestad, Skare, Tyssedal, Jondal, Herand, Kysnesstranda, and Torsnes.

The main inhabited part of Ullensvang Municipality lies just to the west of Hardangervidda National Park, which covers most of the Hardangervidda plateau, Europe's largest mountain plateau. Most inhabitants live in the narrow coastal mountainsides and valleys along the Hardangerfjorden and Sørfjorden. The largest urban areas in Ullensvang are Odda, Kinsarvik, Jondal, and Lofthus. The Norwegian National Road 13 and the European route E134 are the two main roads through the municipality. National road 13 crosses the Hardangerfjorden via the Hardanger Bridge, just north of the municipal border.

The 3,229.9-square-kilometre (1,247.1 sq mi) municipality is the 12th largest by area out of the 357 municipalities in Norway. Ullensvang Municipality is the 107th most populous municipality in Norway with a population of 10,981. The municipality's population density is 3.4 inhabitants per square kilometre (8.8/sq mi) and its population has decreased by 3.9% over the previous 10-year period. The number of inhabitants has shown a decrease of several hundred people since 1980. This development can be seen in light of the general depopulation of rural Norway.

A newly built replica of a historic stave church, opened to the public in 2025, above the centre of the town of Odda.

== General information ==
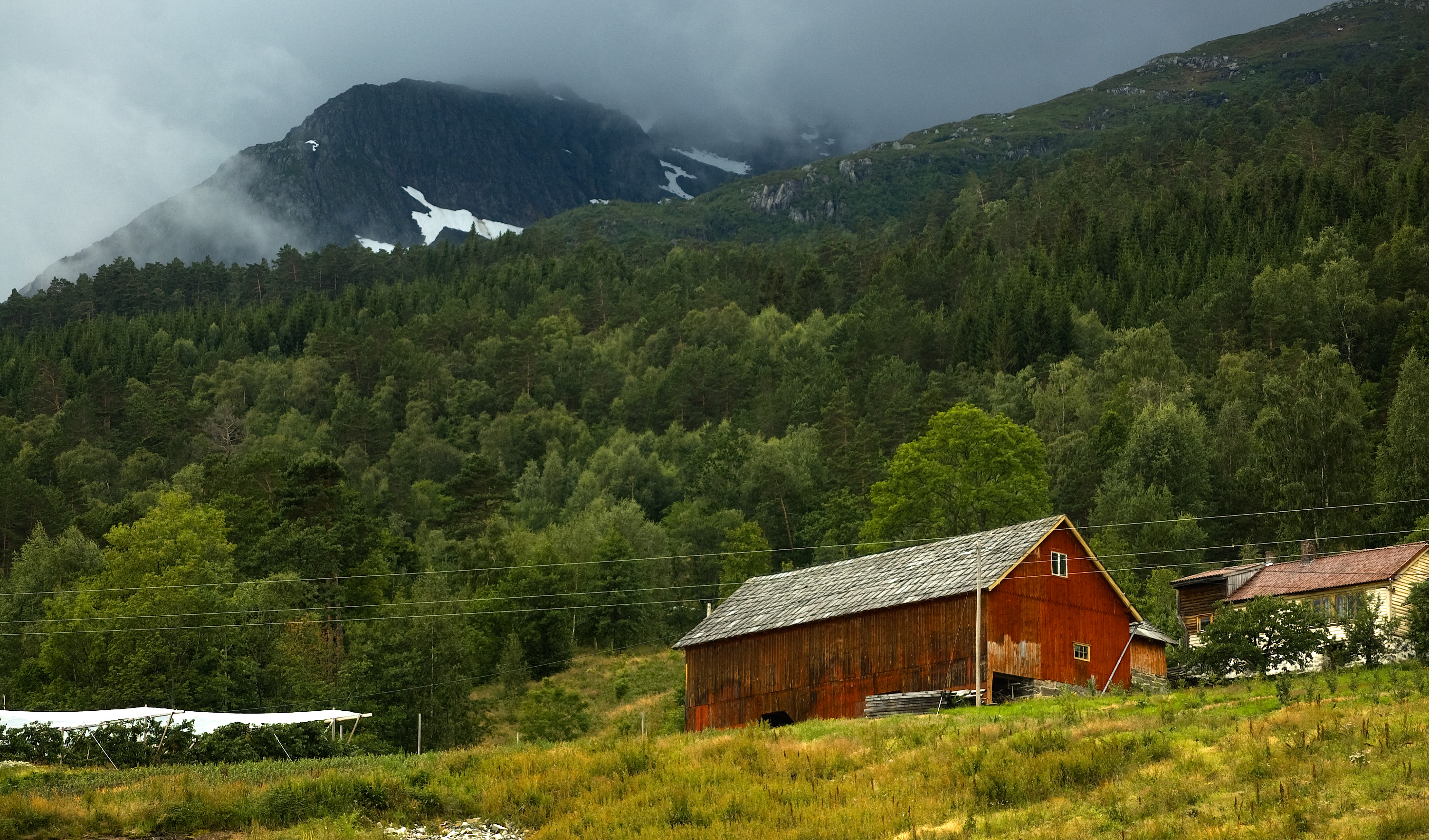
Mountain farm in Ullensvang

=== Name ===
The municipality (originally the parish) is named after the old Ullensvang farm (Old Norse: Ullinsvangr) since the first Ullensvang Church was built there. The first element is the genitive case of the name of the Norse god Ullin (an alternate form of the name Ullr). The last element is vangr which means "field" or "meadow".

From 1838 until 1869, the name was Kinservik Municipality. On 1 January 1869, the name was changed to Ullensvang Municipality.

Ullensvang Municipality historically used the word herad instead of kommune in its name. Both Norwegian words can be translated to be "municipality", but herad is an older word that historically was only used for rural municipalities. Municipalities can choose to use one or the other, but most use the more modern kommune. From 1838 until the mid-20th century, most municipalities used herad or herred (using the Nynorsk or Bokmål spelling) for their name, but after some legal changes in the law on municipalities in the 1950s and onwards, most municipalities switched to kommune. In 2020, when Ullensvang Municipality was enlarged, the municipal council chose to switch to kommune instead of herad. Since that change, there are now three municipalities in Norway that use herad: Voss Municipality, Kvam Municipality, and Ulvik Municipality. There are also a few municipalities with herad in the name such as Kvinnherad Municipality.

=== Coat of arms ===
The original coat of arms was granted on 8 November 1979 and it was in use until 1 January 2020 when a new version of the arms was put into use. The official blazon was "Gules, a bar Or between three fleur-de-lis of the same" (Norwegian: I raudt ein gull bjelke følgd av tre gull liljer, to over og ei under bjelken). This means the arms have a red field (background) and the charge is a horizontal stripe across the middle, with three fleur-de-lis designs (two above the stripe, one below). The charge has a tincture of Or which means it is commonly colored yellow, but if it is made out of metal, then gold is used. The design of the arms was derived from the arms of Sigurd Brynjulvsson Galte, a medieval nobleman from the area. They can be seen on his gravestone from 1302 at the local church. As it is the oldest gravestone in the church, the arms were well known in the village, hence the choice for the arms of this knight as municipal arms. The arms were designed by Magnus Hardeland. The municipal flag has the same design as the coat of arms.

A new coat of arms was granted in 2019 for use starting on 1 January 2020 after Odda and Jondal municipalities were merged with Ullensvang. The new arms were the same design as the previous arms, but they incorporated the colors from the old arms of Odda Municipality (blue and white instead of red and gold). The official blazon for the new arms is "Azure, a bar argent between three fleur-de-lis of the same" (Norwegian: I blå ein sølv bjelke følgd av tre sølv liljer, to over og ei under bjelken).

Arms from 1979 to 2019

Current arms since 2020

=== Churches ===
The Church of Norway has eight parishes (sokn) within Ullensvang Municipality. It is part of the Hardanger og Voss prosti (deanery) in the Diocese of Bjørgvin.

Churches in Ullensvang Municipality
| Parish (sokn) | Church name | Location of the church | Year built |
|---|---|---|---|
| Jondal | Jondal Church | Jondal | 1888 |
| Kinsarvik | Kinsarvik Church | Kinsarvik | 1150 |
| Odda | Odda Church | Odda | 1870 |
| Røldal | Røldal Stave Church | Røldal | c. 1250 |
| Skare | Skare Church | Skare | 1926 |
| Tyssedal | Tyssedal Church | Tyssedal | 1965 |
| Ullensvang | Ullensvang Church | Lofthus | 1250 |
| Utne | Utne Church | Utne | 1895 |

== History ==
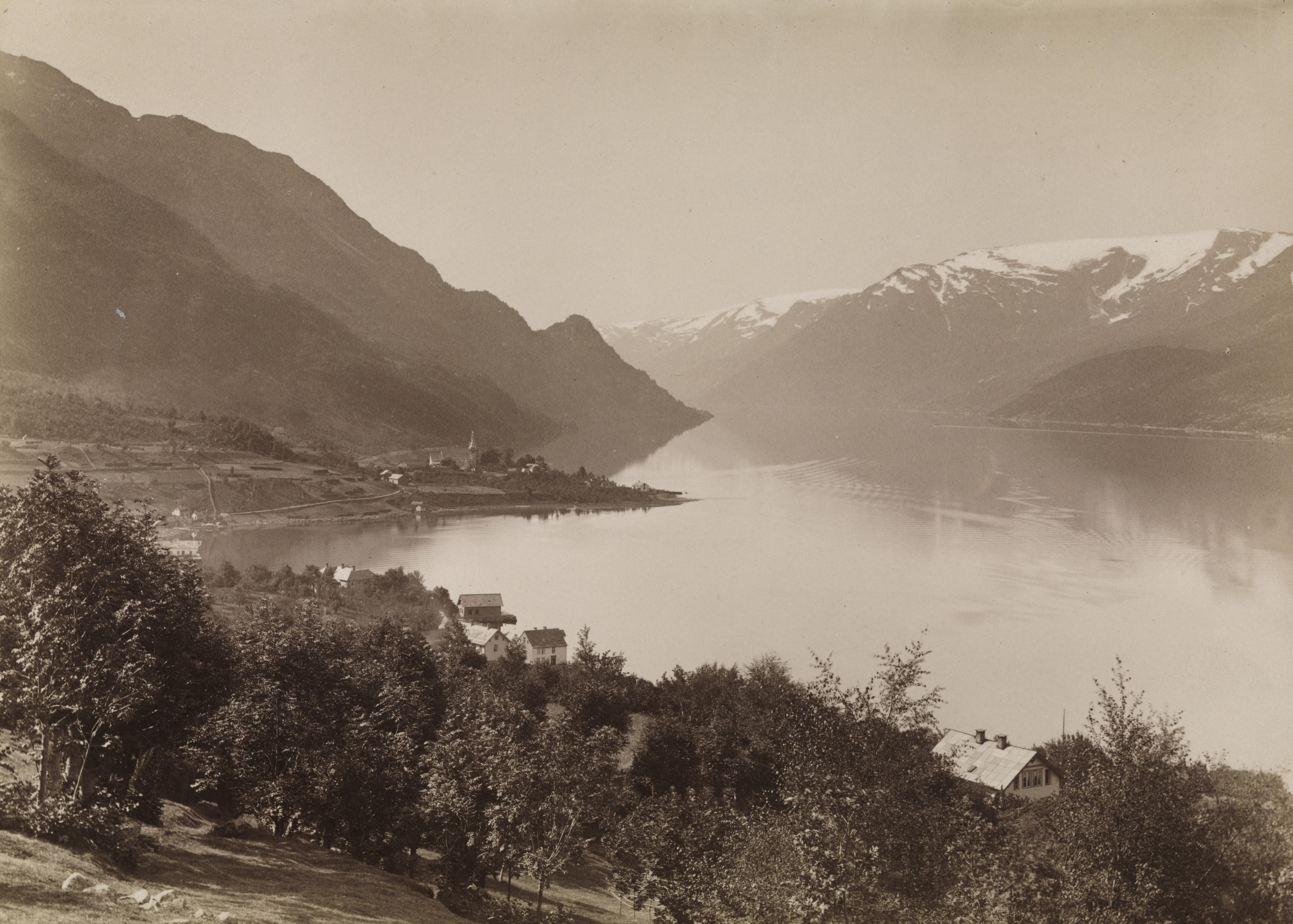
View of the Sørfjorden from Lofthus, looking towards the Folgefonna glacier (c. 1885)

On 1 January 1838, the large parish of Kinservik was established as a municipality (see formannskapsdistrikt law) and it was named Kinservik Municipality. The large parish was made up of the main parish of Kinservik and the annex of Ullensvang. On 1 January 1869, Ullensvang became the main parish and Kinsarvik became an annex to Ullensvang. At this time the municipality changed its name to Ullensvang Municipality.

On 1 January 1882, a small area of Ullensvang Municipality (population: 22) was transferred to the neighboring Vikør Municipality. On 1 July 1913, Ullensvang was divided into three parts as follows:

- the southern district (population: 3,077) became the new Odda Municipality
- the northern district (population: 1,736) became the new Kinsarvik Municipality
- the central district (population: 1,941) continued as a much smaller Ullensvang Municipality

During the 1960s, there were many municipal mergers across Norway due to the work of the Schei Committee. On 1 January 1964, the following areas were merged to form a new, much larger Ullensvang Municipality:

- all of Ullensvang Municipality (population: 2,358)
- all of Eidfjord Municipality (population: 983)
- most of Kinsarvik Municipality (population: 1,513), except for the Lussand-Kvanndal area which went to Granvin Municipality

On 1 January 1965, the Åsgrenda area of Kvam Municipality (population: 61) was transferred to Ullensvang Municipality. After the large merger in 1964, there was a lot of discontent in the area of the old Eidfjord Municipality. On 1 January 1977, the area that was Eidfjord Municipality before 1964 became its own municipality once again. This left Ullensvang Municipality with 3,937 residents.

On 1 January 2020, Jondal Municipality, Odda Municipality, and Ullensvang Municipality were merged into a new, larger Ullensvang Municipality. At that time, the administrative centre was moved from the village of Kinsarvik to the larger town of Odda. On 1 January 2022, the Ytre Bu area of Ullensvang (population: 24) was transferred to the neighboring Eidfjord Municipality. Historically, this municipality was part of the old Hordaland county. On 1 January 2020, the newly enlarged Ullensvang Municipality became a part of the newly-formed Vestland county (after Hordaland and Sogn og Fjordane counties were merged).

== Population ==
Historical population

| Year | Pop. | ±% |
|---|---|---|
| 1855 | 5,662 | — |
| 1865 | 5,781 | +2.1% |
| 1875 | 5,645 | −2.4% |
| 1891 | 5,446 | −3.5% |
| 1900 | 5,538 | +1.7% |
| 1910 | 6,154 | +11.1% |

| Year | Pop. | ±% |
|---|---|---|
| 1920 | 1,940 | −68.5% |
| 1930 | 2,024 | +4.3% |
| 1946 | 2,441 | +20.6% |
| 1951 | 2,294 | −6.0% |
| 1960 | 2,420 | +5.5% |
| 1970 | 4,848 | +100.3% |

| Year | Pop. | ±% |
|---|---|---|
| 1980 | 4,041 | −16.6% |
| 1990 | 3,988 | −1.3% |
| 2000 | 3,562 | −10.7% |
| 2010 | 3,382 | −5.1% |
| 2020 | 11,048 | +226.7% |
| 2023 | 11,148 | +0.9% |

Note: The municipal borders were changed in 1913, 1964, 1977, and 2020, causing a significant change in the population.
Source: Statistics Norway and Norwegian Historical Data Centre

== Geography ==
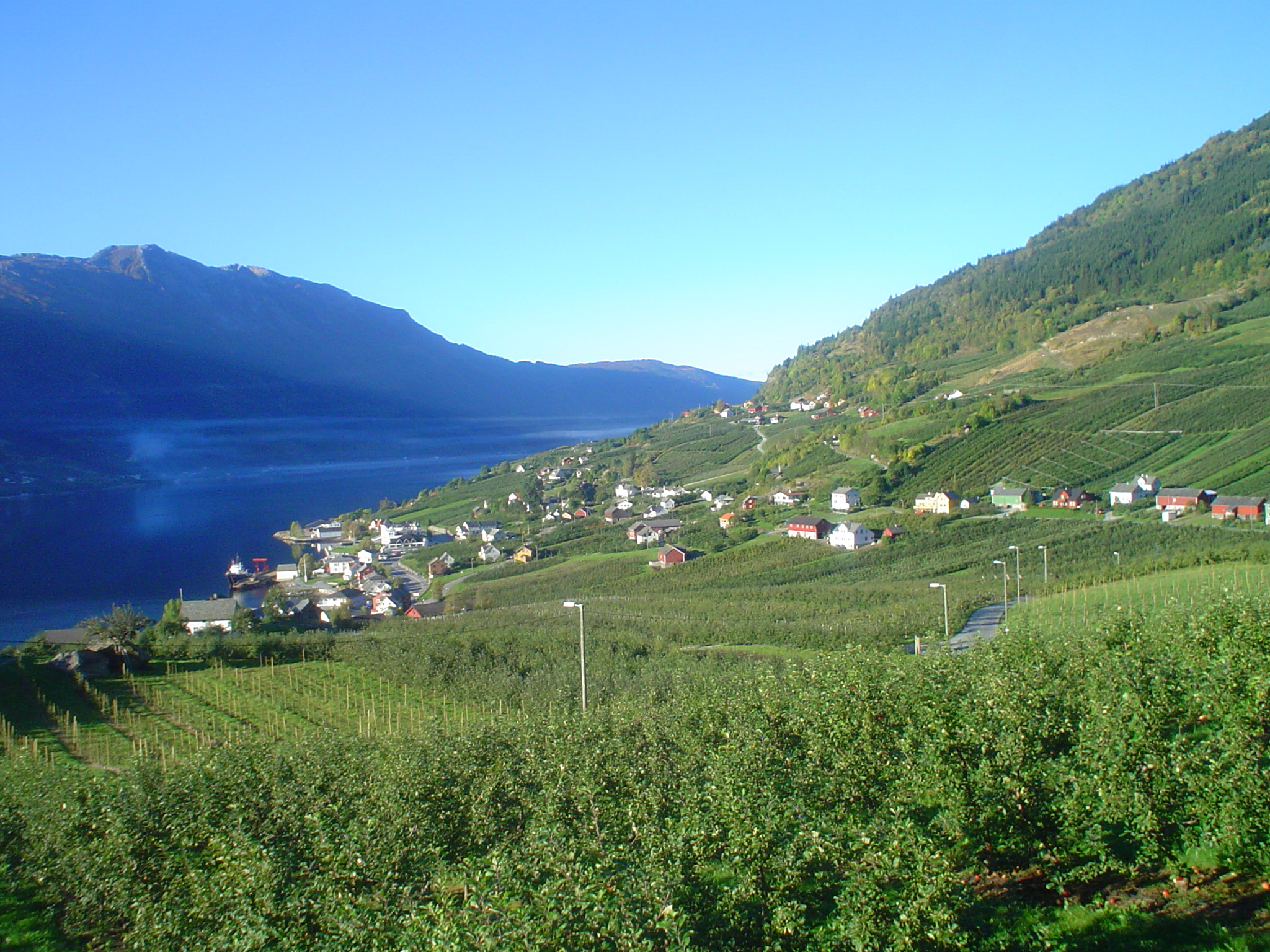
View of the Opedal area and all the surrounding orchards

Ullensvang Municipality is located on the shores of the Hardangerfjorden and the Sørfjorden and it stretches all the way up to the Folgefonna glacier inside Folgefonna National Park on the Folgefonna peninsula in the western part of the municipality. The Folgefonna glacier is actually made up of three large sections: Midtre Folgefonna, Nordre Folgefonna, and Søndre Folgefonna. The municipality continues up to the vast Hardangervidda plateau in the east, including part of the Hardangervidda National Park. The lakes Juklavatnet, Kvennsjøen, Langavatnet, Ringedalsvatnet, Røldalsvatnet, Sandvinvatnet, Valldalsvatnet, Veivatnet, and Votna are all located in the municipality. Ullensvang has many waterfalls including Espelandsfossen, Låtefossen, Skrikjofossen, and Tyssestrengene. The highest point in the municipality is the 1,721.26-metre (5,647.2 ft) tall mountain Sandfloegga. The mountains Hårteigen and Kistenuten are also located in the municipality.

Voss Municipality lies to the north, Ulvik Municipality and Eidfjord Municipality both lie to the northeast, Vinje Municipality (in Telemark county) lies to the east, Suldal Municipality and Sauda Municipality (both are in Rogaland county) lie to the south, Etne Municipality and Kvinnherad Municipality lie to the southwest, and Kvam Municipality lies to the west.

== Climate ==
The lowland areas of Ullensvang near the Hardangerfjord has a temperate oceanic climate (marine west coast climate, Cfb in the Köppen climate classification). The average daily high range from 3.0 °C (37.4 °F) in January and February to 20.0 °C (68.0 °F) in July. The driest season is April - August, while the wettest is October - March. The all-time high temperature is 33.5 °C (92.3 °F) recorded 28 July 2019; the all-time low is −14.5 °C (5.9 °F) recorded 9 February 1966. The weather station Ullensvang Forsøksgard has been recording temperature since 1865.

Climate data for Ullensvang Forsøksgard 1991-2020 (12 m, extremes 1962-2020)
| Month | Jan | Feb | Mar | Apr | May | Jun | Jul | Aug | Sep | Oct | Nov | Dec | Year |
|---|---|---|---|---|---|---|---|---|---|---|---|---|---|
| Record high °C (°F) | 13 (55) | 12.6 (54.7) | 15.5 (59.9) | 20.9 (69.6) | 30.3 (86.5) | 30.7 (87.3) | 33.5 (92.3) | 29.4 (84.9) | 24.8 (76.6) | 20.5 (68.9) | 15.8 (60.4) | 13.8 (56.8) | 33.5 (92.3) |
| Daily mean °C (°F) | 1.3 (34.3) | 0.7 (33.3) | 2.9 (37.2) | 6.3 (43.3) | 10.4 (50.7) | 13.9 (57.0) | 16.1 (61.0) | 15 (59) | 11.4 (52.5) | 7.1 (44.8) | 3.9 (39.0) | 1.7 (35.1) | 7.6 (45.6) |
| Record low °C (°F) | −13.8 (7.2) | −14.5 (5.9) | −11.7 (10.9) | −5.6 (21.9) | 0.1 (32.2) | 1.4 (34.5) | 6 (43) | 5.5 (41.9) | 1.9 (35.4) | −4.1 (24.6) | −11.6 (11.1) | −11.4 (11.5) | −14.5 (5.9) |
| Average precipitation mm (inches) | 222 (8.7) | 159 (6.3) | 169 (6.7) | 87 (3.4) | 78 (3.1) | 75 (3.0) | 77 (3.0) | 91 (3.6) | 138 (5.4) | 179 (7.0) | 187 (7.4) | 243 (9.6) | 1,705 (67.2) |
Source 1: eklima/Norwegian Meteorological Institute
Source 2: yr.no Ullensvang

== Government ==
Ullensvang Municipality is responsible for primary education (through 10th grade), outpatient health services, senior citizen services, welfare and other social services, zoning, economic development, and municipal roads and utilities. The municipality is governed by a municipal council of directly elected representatives. The mayor is indirectly elected by a vote of the municipal council. The municipality is under the jurisdiction of the Hordaland District Court and the Gulating Court of Appeal.

=== Municipal council ===
The municipal council (Kommunestyre) of Ullensvang Municipality is made up of 33 representatives that are elected to four-year terms. The tables below show the current and historical composition of the council by political party.

Ullensvang kommunestyre 2023–2027
| Party name (in Nynorsk) | Number of representatives |
|---|---|
| Labour Party (Arbeidarpartiet) | 11 |
| Conservative Party (Høgre) | 3 |
| Industry and Business Party (Industri‑ og Næringspartiet) | 3 |
| Christian Democratic Party (Kristeleg Folkeparti) | 1 |
| Red Party (Raudt) | 2 |
| Centre Party (Senterpartiet) | 12 |
| Socialist Left Party (Sosialistisk Venstreparti) | 1 |
| Total number of members: | 33 |

Ullensvang kommunestyre 2019–2023
| Party name (in Nynorsk) | Number of representatives |
|---|---|
| Labour Party (Arbeidarpartiet) | 14 |
| Progress Party (Framstegspartiet) | 1 |
| Conservative Party (Høgre) | 4 |
| Christian Democratic Party (Kristeleg Folkeparti) | 1 |
| Red Party (Raudt) | 2 |
| Centre Party (Senterpartiet) | 9 |
| Socialist Left Party (Sosialistisk Venstreparti) | 1 |
| Liberal Party (Venstre) | 1 |
| Total number of members: | 33 |
Note: In 2020, Jondal Municipality and Odda Municipality became part of Ullensvang Municipality.

Ullensvang heradsstyre 2015–2019
| Party name (in Nynorsk) | Number of representatives |
|---|---|
| Labour Party (Arbeidarpartiet) | 3 |
| Conservative Party (Høgre) | 3 |
| Christian Democratic Party (Kristeleg Folkeparti) | 1 |
| Centre Party (Senterpartiet) | 9 |
| Socialist Left Party (Sosialistisk Venstreparti) | 3 |
| Liberal Party (Venstre) | 2 |
| Total number of members: | 21 |

Ullensvang heradsstyre 2011–2015
| Party name (in Nynorsk) | Number of representatives |
|---|---|
| Labour Party (Arbeidarpartiet) | 2 |
| Conservative Party (Høgre) | 4 |
| Christian Democratic Party (Kristeleg Folkeparti) | 1 |
| Centre Party (Senterpartiet) | 8 |
| Socialist Left Party (Sosialistisk Venstreparti) | 1 |
| Liberal Party (Venstre) | 5 |
| Total number of members: | 21 |

Ullensvang heradsstyre 2007–2011
| Party name (in Nynorsk) | Number of representatives |
|---|---|
| Labour Party (Arbeidarpartiet) | 3 |
| Conservative Party (Høgre) | 4 |
| Christian Democratic Party (Kristeleg Folkeparti) | 1 |
| Centre Party (Senterpartiet) | 9 |
| Socialist Left Party (Sosialistisk Venstreparti) | 2 |
| Liberal Party (Venstre) | 2 |
| Total number of members: | 21 |

Ullensvang heradsstyre 2003–2007
| Party name (in Nynorsk) | Number of representatives |
|---|---|
| Labour Party (Arbeidarpartiet) | 3 |
| Conservative Party (Høgre) | 6 |
| Christian Democratic Party (Kristeleg Folkeparti) | 1 |
| Centre Party (Senterpartiet) | 7 |
| Socialist Left Party (Sosialistisk Venstreparti) | 3 |
| Liberal Party (Venstre) | 1 |
| Total number of members: | 21 |

Ullensvang heradsstyre 1999–2003
| Party name (in Nynorsk) | Number of representatives |
|---|---|
| Labour Party (Arbeidarpartiet) | 3 |
| Conservative Party (Høgre) | 7 |
| Christian Democratic Party (Kristeleg Folkeparti) | 1 |
| Centre Party (Senterpartiet) | 6 |
| Socialist Left Party (Sosialistisk Venstreparti) | 2 |
| Liberal Party (Venstre) | 2 |
| Total number of members: | 21 |

Ullensvang heradsstyre 1995–1999
| Party name (in Nynorsk) | Number of representatives |
|---|---|
| Labour Party (Arbeidarpartiet) | 6 |
| Conservative Party (Høgre) | 4 |
| Christian Democratic Party (Kristeleg Folkeparti) | 1 |
| Centre Party (Senterpartiet) | 10 |
| Socialist Left Party (Sosialistisk Venstreparti) | 2 |
| Liberal Party (Venstre) | 2 |
| Total number of members: | 25 |

Ullensvang heradsstyre 1991–1995
| Party name (in Nynorsk) | Number of representatives |
|---|---|
| Labour Party (Arbeidarpartiet) | 4 |
| Conservative Party (Høgre) | 6 |
| Christian Democratic Party (Kristeleg Folkeparti) | 1 |
| Centre Party (Senterpartiet) | 9 |
| Socialist Left Party (Sosialistisk Venstreparti) | 3 |
| Liberal Party (Venstre) | 2 |
| Total number of members: | 25 |

Ullensvang heradsstyre 1987–1991
| Party name (in Nynorsk) | Number of representatives |
|---|---|
| Labour Party (Arbeidarpartiet) | 6 |
| Conservative Party (Høgre) | 5 |
| Christian Democratic Party (Kristeleg Folkeparti) | 1 |
| Centre Party (Senterpartiet) | 8 |
| Socialist Left Party (Sosialistisk Venstreparti) | 2 |
| Liberal Party (Venstre) | 2 |
| Non-party list (Upolitisk liste) | 1 |
| Total number of members: | 25 |

Ullensvang heradsstyre 1983–1987
| Party name (in Nynorsk) | Number of representatives |
|---|---|
| Labour Party (Arbeidarpartiet) | 5 |
| Progress Party (Framstegspartiet) | 1 |
| Conservative Party (Høgre) | 5 |
| Christian Democratic Party (Kristeleg Folkeparti) | 2 |
| Centre Party (Senterpartiet) | 9 |
| Socialist Left Party (Sosialistisk Venstreparti) | 1 |
| Liberal Party (Venstre) | 2 |
| Total number of members: | 25 |

Ullensvang heradsstyre 1979–1983
| Party name (in Nynorsk) | Number of representatives |
|---|---|
| Labour Party (Arbeidarpartiet) | 6 |
| Conservative Party (Høgre) | 7 |
| Christian Democratic Party (Kristeleg Folkeparti) | 2 |
| Centre Party (Senterpartiet) | 8 |
| Liberal Party (Venstre) | 2 |
| Total number of members: | 25 |

Ullensvang heradsstyre 1975–1979
| Party name (in Nynorsk) | Number of representatives |
|---|---|
| Labour Party (Arbeidarpartiet) | 9 |
| Conservative Party (Høgre) | 4 |
| Christian Democratic Party (Kristeleg Folkeparti) | 2 |
| Centre Party (Senterpartiet) | 11 |
| Liberal Party (Venstre) | 2 |
| Local list (Bygdelista) | 1 |
| Total number of members: | 29 |
Note: In 1977, Eidfjord Municipality was split off from Ullensvang Municipality.

Ullensvang heradsstyre 1971–1975
| Party name (in Nynorsk) | Number of representatives |
|---|---|
| Labour Party (Arbeidarpartiet) | 8 |
| Centre Party (Senterpartiet) | 10 |
| Joint List(s) of Non-Socialist Parties (Borgarlege Felleslister) | 9 |
| Local List(s) (Lokale lister) | 2 |
| Total number of members: | 29 |

Ullensvang heradsstyre 1967–1971
| Party name (in Nynorsk) | Number of representatives |
|---|---|
| Labour Party (Arbeidarpartiet) | 8 |
| Conservative Party (Høgre) | 4 |
| Christian Democratic Party (Kristeleg Folkeparti) | 2 |
| Centre Party (Senterpartiet) | 10 |
| Liberal Party (Venstre) | 5 |
| Total number of members: | 29 |

Ullensvang heradsstyre 1963–1967
| Party name (in Nynorsk) | Number of representatives |
|---|---|
| Labour Party (Arbeidarpartiet) | 8 |
| Conservative Party (Høgre) | 4 |
| Christian Democratic Party (Kristeleg Folkeparti) | 1 |
| Centre Party (Senterpartiet) | 10 |
| Liberal Party (Venstre) | 6 |
| Total number of members: | 29 |
Note: In 1964, Eidfjord Municipality and Kinsarvik Municipality became part of Ullensvang Municipality.

Ullensvang heradsstyre 1959–1963
| Party name (in Nynorsk) | Number of representatives |
|---|---|
| Labour Party (Arbeidarpartiet) | 3 |
| Conservative Party (Høgre) | 1 |
| Centre Party (Senterpartiet) | 5 |
| Liberal Party (Venstre) | 4 |
| Total number of members: | 13 |

Ullensvang heradsstyre 1955–1959
| Party name (in Nynorsk) | Number of representatives |
|---|---|
| Labour Party (Arbeidarpartiet) | 4 |
| Local List(s) (Lokale lister) | 9 |
| Total number of members: | 13 |

Ullensvang heradsstyre 1951–1955
| Party name (in Nynorsk) | Number of representatives |
|---|---|
| Labour Party (Arbeidarpartiet) | 3 |
| Liberal Party (Venstre) | 6 |
| Joint List(s) of Non-Socialist Parties (Borgarlege Felleslister) | 3 |
| Total number of members: | 12 |

Ullensvang heradsstyre 1947–1951
| Party name (in Nynorsk) | Number of representatives |
|---|---|
| Labour Party (Arbeidarpartiet) | 3 |
| Joint List(s) of Non-Socialist Parties (Borgarlege Felleslister) | 9 |
| Total number of members: | 12 |

Ullensvang heradsstyre 1945–1947
| Party name (in Nynorsk) | Number of representatives |
|---|---|
| Labour Party (Arbeidarpartiet) | 5 |
| Local List(s) (Lokale lister) | 7 |
| Total number of members: | 12 |

Ullensvang heradsstyre 1937–1941*
| Party name (in Nynorsk) | Number of representatives |
|---|---|
| Labour Party (Arbeidarpartiet) | 2 |
| Joint List(s) of Non-Socialist Parties (Borgarlege Felleslister) | 10 |
| Total number of members: | 12 |
Note: Due to the German occupation of Norway during World War II, no elections were held for new municipal councils until after the war ended in 1945.

=== Mayors ===
The mayor (Nynorsk: ordførar) of Ullensvang Municipality was the political leader of the municipality and the chairperson of the municipal council. The following people have held this position:

- 1838–1841: Nils Koren
- 1842–1842: Guttorm K. Rogdeberg
- 1844–1871: Johannes Johannesen Aga
- 1872–1873: Hans H. Utne
- 1874–1879: Johannes Johannesen Aga
- 1880–1895: Johannes Helleland
- 1896–1897: Torstein Hus
- 1898–1905: Johannes Helleland
- 1905–1910: Torstein Hus
- 1911–1919: Halldor Eidnes
- 1920–1945: Thorvald H. Utne
- 1946–1951: Oddmund A. Aarhus
- 1952–1955: Knut L. Måge
- 1956–1959: Lars Bergo
- 1959–1963: Knut L. Måge (V)
- 1964–1968: Jakob D. Hus
- 1968–1973: Torgils Lægreid
- 1974–1976: Tomas Sekse (Sp)
- 1976–1991: Torolv Hesthamar (Sp)
- 1991–1995: Lars Haustveit (Sp)
- 1995–1999: Torgils L. Jåstad (Sp)
- 1999–2003: Einar Lutro (H)
- 2003–2019: Solfrid Borge (Sp)
- 2019–present: Roald Aga Haug (Ap)

=== Police ===
In 2016, the chief of police for Vestlandet formally suggested a reconfiguration of police districts and stations. He proposed that the police station for Ullensvang og Eidfjord be closed.

== Attractions ==
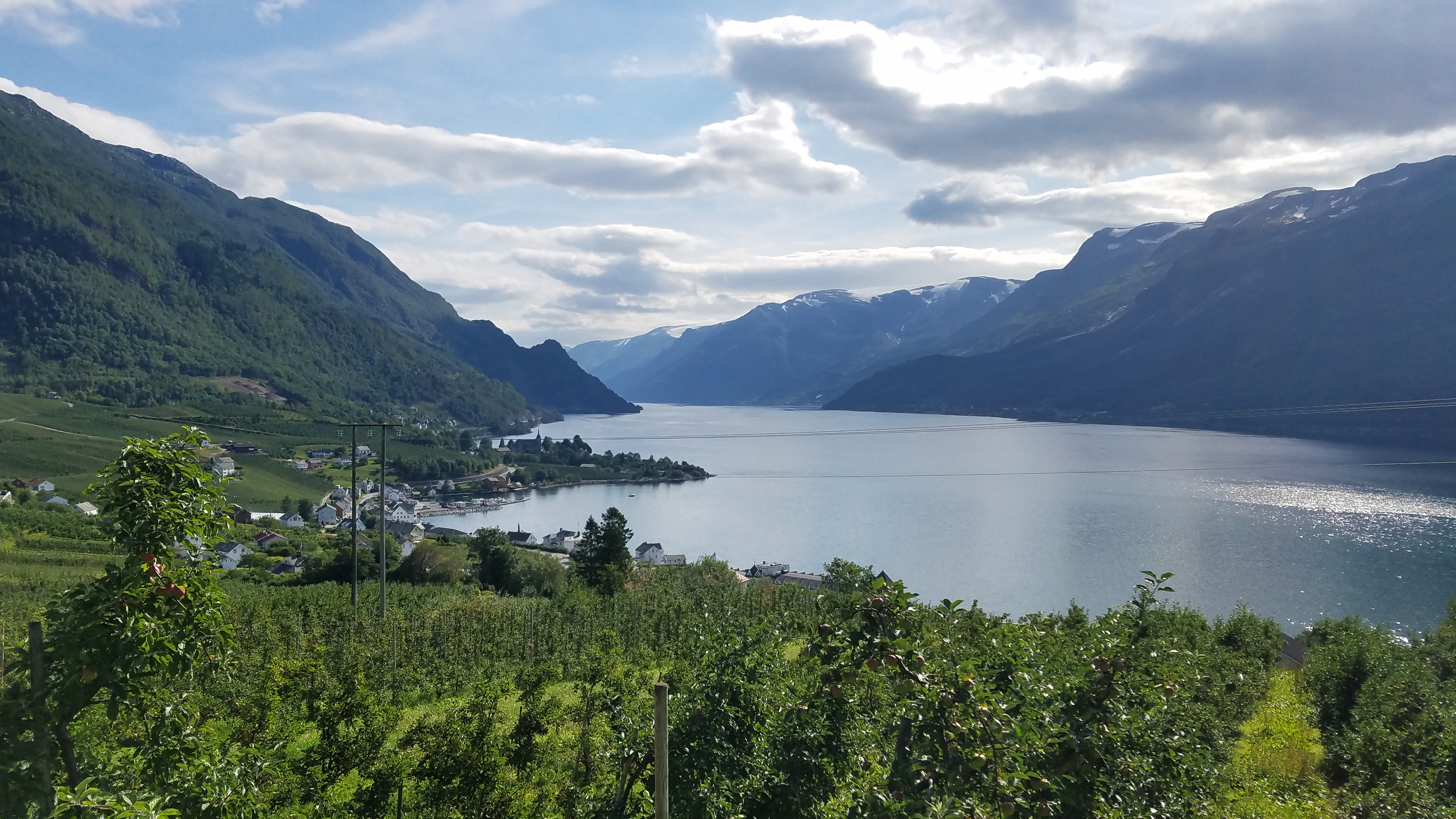
View of the Lofthus area with fruit orchards

Ullensvang is Norway's biggest supplier of fruit, especially sweet cherries and apples. Every summer a cherry festival is held at Lofthus, where the Norwegian championship of cherry stone spitting is held. The record is 14.24 metres (46.7 ft) by S. Kleivkaas. Each May, a musical festival is held at Ullensvang Hotel (built in 1846), when musicians from all of Norway come to the village. The famous composer Edvard Grieg spent many summers at Lofthus, and the festival is held in his honor. During the summer, the population is doubled due to tourism. Attractions in addition to the previous mentioned, are the medieval Ullensvang Church at Lofthus (built around 1250) and Kinsarvik Church (built around 1150), several waterfalls such as the Skrikjofossen, the flowering season in May, and museums at Aga, Utne, and Skredhaugen.

Noted buildings include one that is inspired by a stave church (and sometimes incorrectly called a copy of a stave church), Lothepus' stave church.

== Notable people ==
=== Public service ===
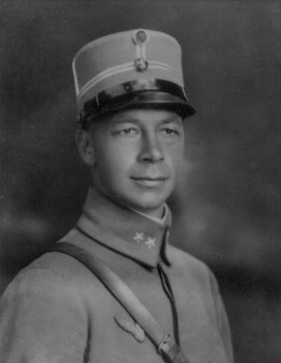
Eiliv Austlid, ca.1925

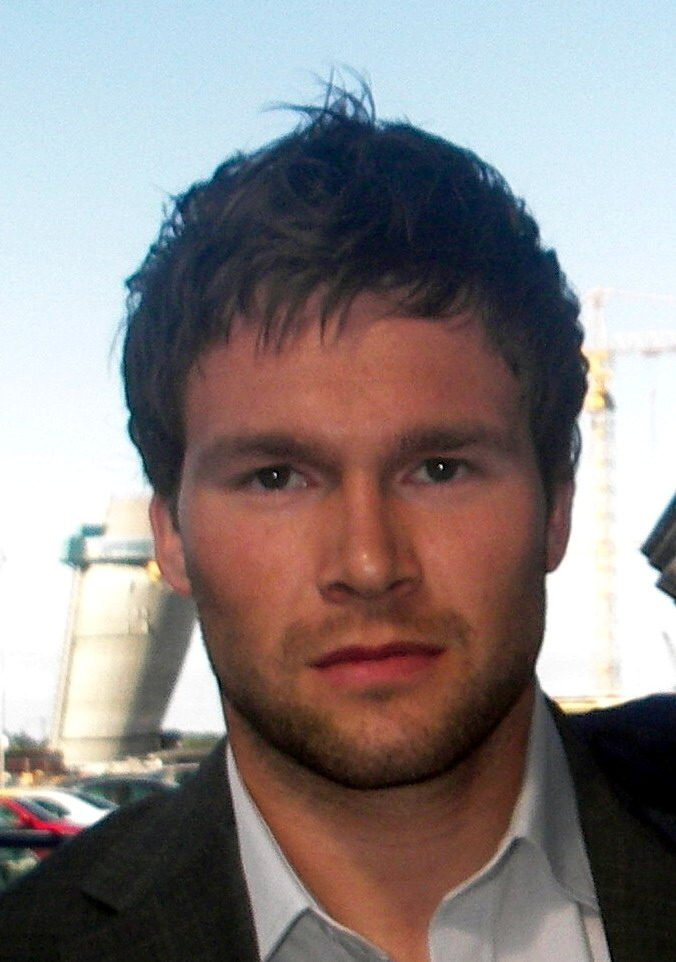
Håkon Opdal, 2007

- Nils Christian Egede Hertzberg (1827 in Ullensvang – 1911), a theologian, educator, and politician
- Knud Knudsen (1832 in Odda – 1915), one of Norway's first professional photographers
- Halldor O. Opedal (1895 in Lofthus – 1986), a teacher and folklorist
- Eiliv Austlid (1899 in Ullensvang – 1940), a farmer and army officer
- Torbjørn Mork (1928 in Odda – 1992), a physician and civil servant

=== The Arts ===
- Nils Tjoflot (1865 in Tjoflot – 1898), a violinist
- Georg Brochmann (1894 in Ullensvang – 1952), a journalist, writer and playwright
- Zinken Hopp (1905 in Ullensvang – 1987), an author, poet and playwright
- Claes Gill (1910 in Odda - 1973), an author, poet, and actor
- Anne B. Ragde (born 1957 in Odda), a novelist
- Frode Grytten (born 1960), a writer and journalist who grew up in Odda
- Knut Olav Åmås (born 1968 in Odda), a writer, editor, and politician
- Svein Olav Herstad (born 1969 in Odda), a jazz pianist
- Leif Einar Lothe (born 1969 in Odda), a TV personality who uses the stage name Lothepus
- Marit Eikemo (born 1971 in Odda), an essayist, novelist, journalist, and magazine editor
- Rannveig Djønne (born 1974 in Djønno), a folk musician

=== Sport ===
- Roger Albertsen (1957–2003), a football midfielder with over 300 club caps and 25 for Norway
- Håkon Opdal (born 1982 in Odda), a footballer with over 350 club caps and 12 for Norway
