= Roald Aga Haug =

Norwegian politician (born 1972)

Roald Aga Haug (born 26 July 1972) is a Norwegian politician for the Labour Party.

He served as a deputy representative to the Parliament of Norway from Hordaland during the terms 2009–2013 and 2013–2017. He hails from Odda Municipality.
