= Skrikjofossen =

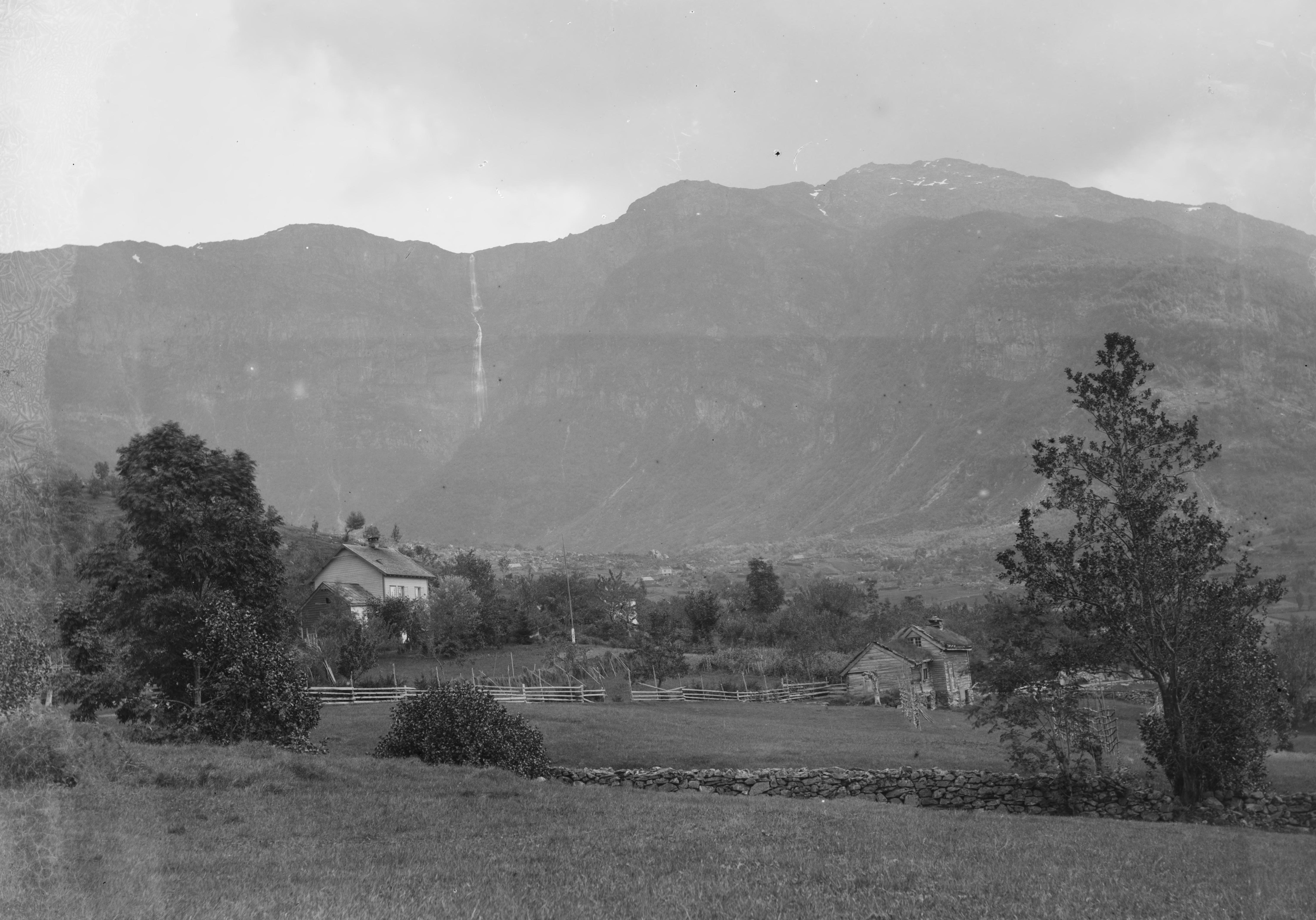
- View of the waterfall in the distance
- Interactive map of Skrikjofossen
- Location: Vestland, Norway
- Coordinates: 60.304319°N 6.693525°E
- Type: Tiered plunge
- Elevation: 929.5 metres (3,050 ft)
- Total height: 455 metres (1,493 ft)
- Number of drops: 2
- Longest drop: 260 metres (853 ft)
- Total width: 15 metres (49 ft)
- Run: 183 metres (600 ft)
- Watercourse: Skrikjo
- Average flow rate: 1 m^{3}/s (35 cu ft/s)

Skrikjofossen (also called Krikjofossen) is a waterfall in Ullensvang Municipality in Vestland county, Norway. The falls are located about 3.5 kilometres (2.2 mi) southeast of the village of Lofthus. Its total height is 455 metres (1,493 ft), while the tallest single drop is 260 metres (850 ft). It tumbles down from the Hardanger Plateau.

== Gallery ==
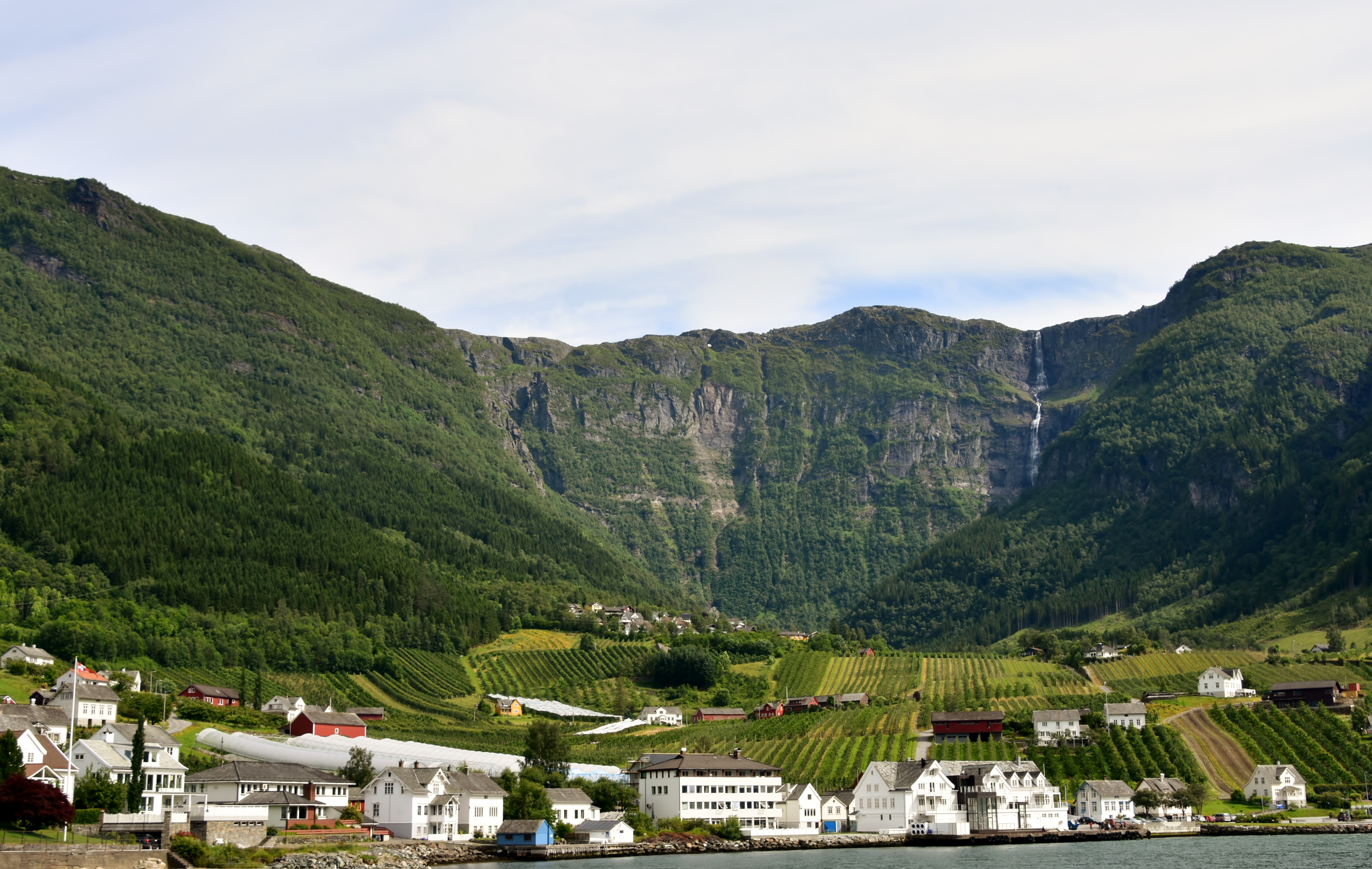
Hardangerfjord in a Nutshell

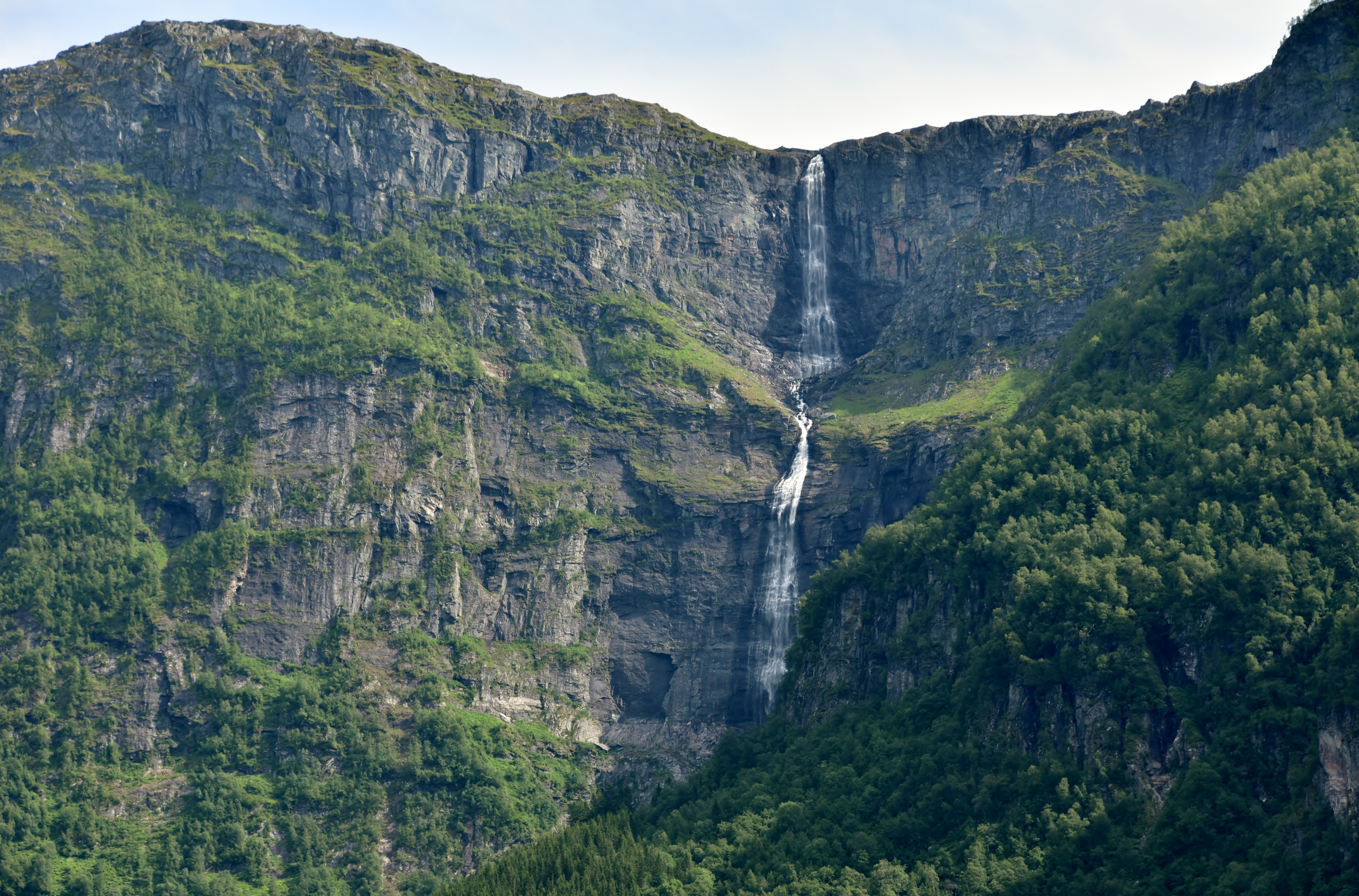
Skrikjofossen (Krikjofossen)

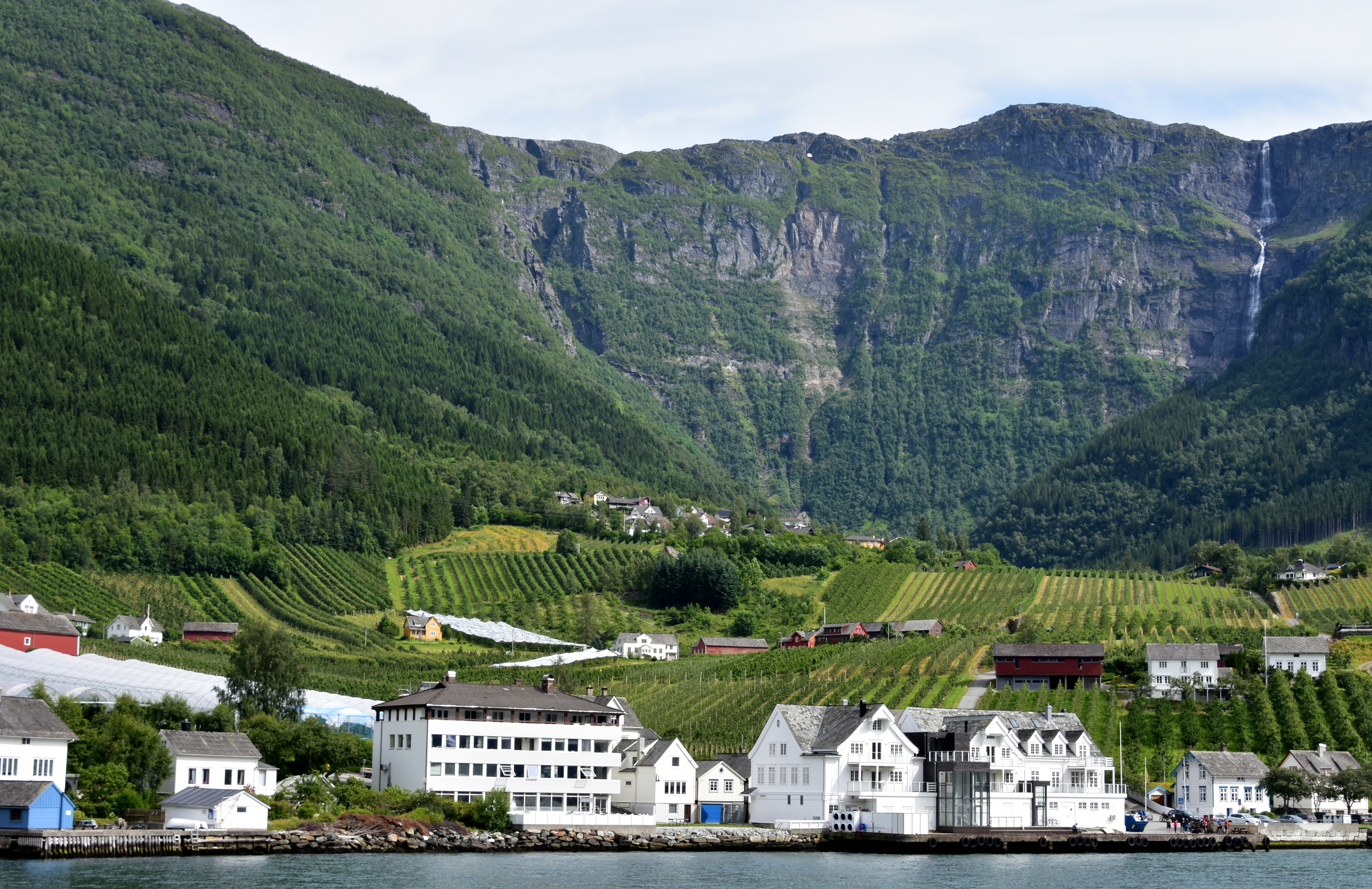
Hardangerfjord

== See also ==
- List of waterfalls
- List of waterfalls by type
