= Einar Lutro =

Norwegian politician (born 1943)

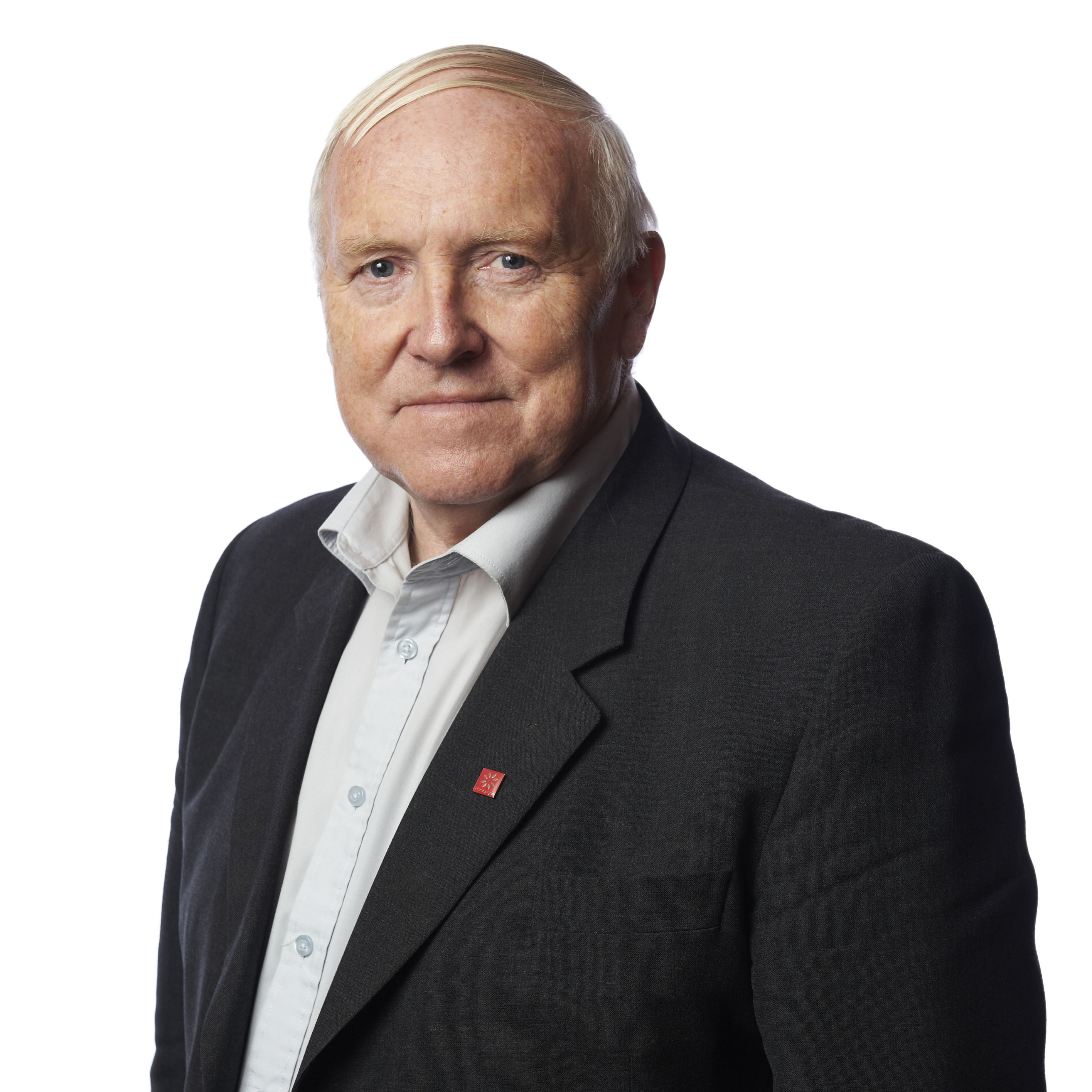
Einar Lutro

Einar Lutro (born 27 July 1943) is a Norwegian politician for the Conservative Party.

He served as a deputy representative to the Norwegian Parliament from Hordaland during the term 2005–2009. On the local level, he was the mayor of Ullensvang Municipality until 2003.
