= Røldalsvatnet =

Lake in Vestland, Norway

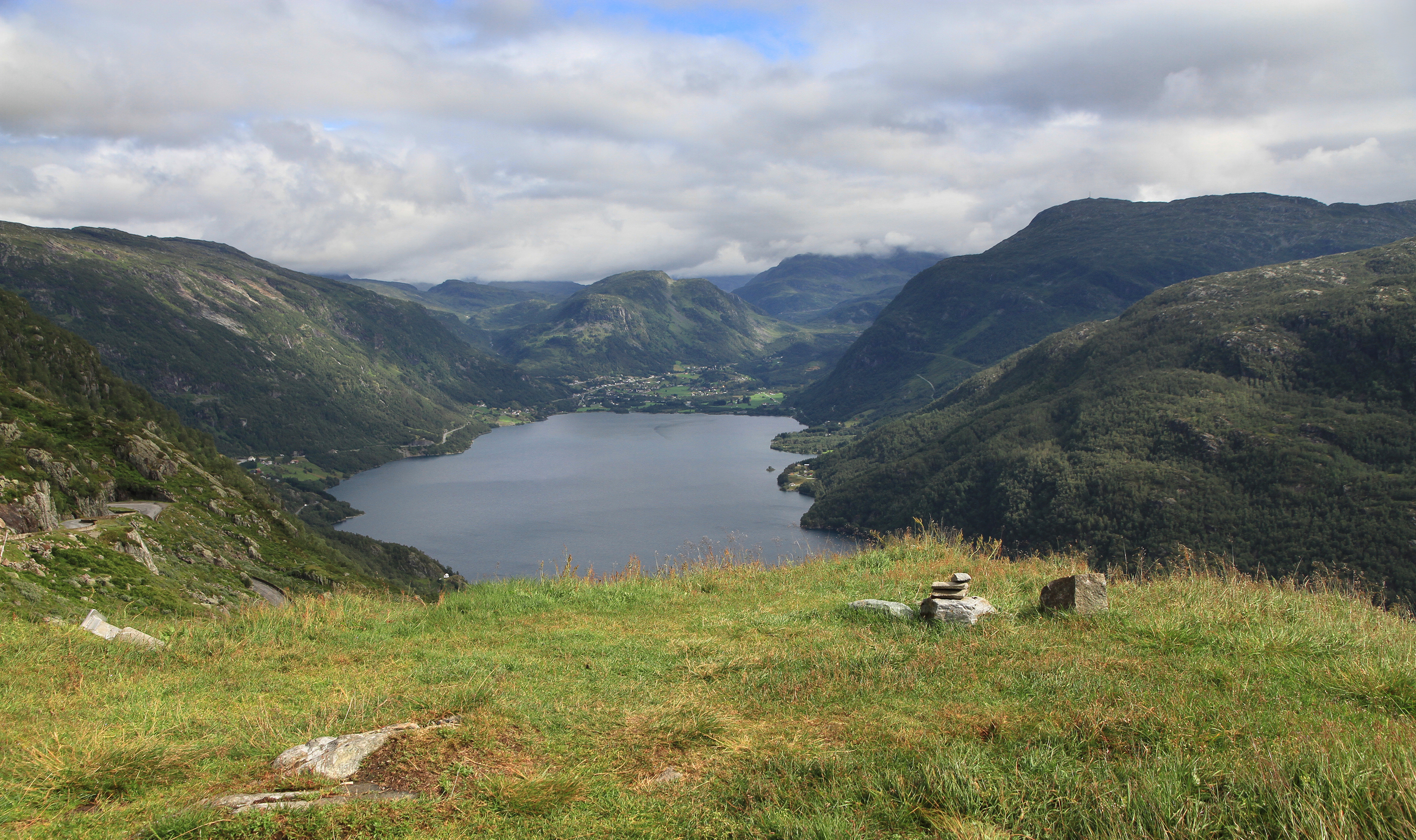
- View of the lake
- Interactive map of Røldalsvatnet
- Location: Ullensvang Municipality, Vestland
- Coordinates: 59.8075°N 6.7813°E
- Basin countries: Norway
- Max. length: 8.8 kilometres (5.5 mi)
- Max. width: 1.3 kilometres (0.81 mi)
- Surface area: 6.99 km^{2} (2.70 sq mi)
- Shore length^{1}: 20.64 kilometres (12.83 mi)
- Surface elevation: 380 metres (1,250 ft)
- References: NVE
- ^{1} Shore length is not a well-defined measure.

Røldalsvatnet is a lake in Ullensvang Municipality in Vestland county, Norway. The 6.99-square-kilometre (2.70 sq mi) lake is located about 35 kilometres (22 mi) south of the town of Odda. The village of Røldal is located at the northern tip of the lake and the village of Botnen is located at the southern end. The European route E134 highway runs along the northern end of the lake, and the Norwegian National Road 13 runs along the western shore of the lake.

== See also ==
- List of lakes in Norway
