= Røldal =

Village in Ullensvang Municipality, Norway

- Village
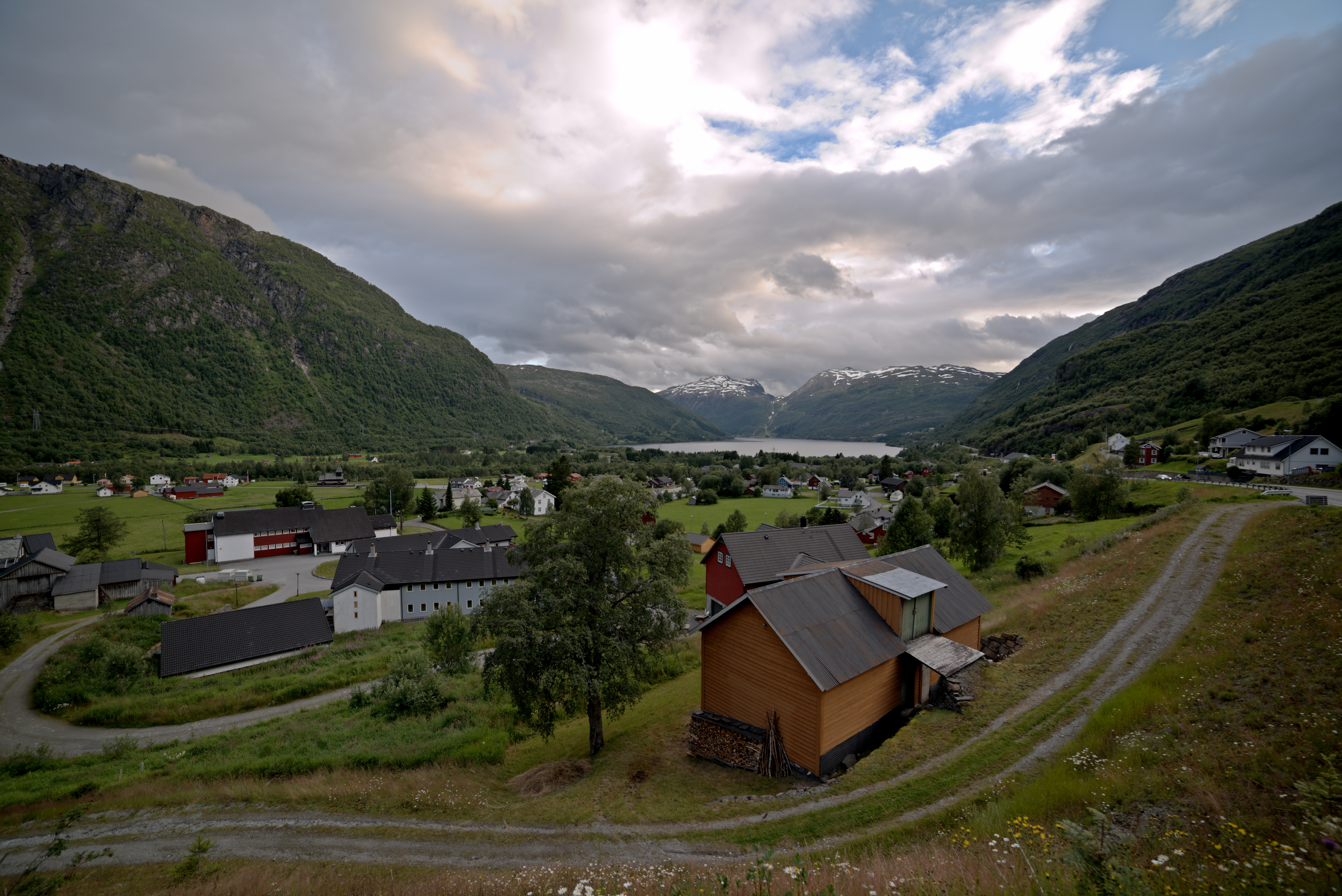
- View of the village and Røldalsvatnet in the background
- Interactive map of Røldal
- Coordinates: 59.83342°N 6.81498°E
- Country: Norway
- Region: Western Norway
- County: Vestland
- District: Hardanger
- Municipality: Ullensvang Municipality

Area
  - Total: 0.68 km^{2} (0.26 sq mi)
- Elevation: 414 m (1,358 ft)

Population (2025)
  - Total: 313
  - Density: 460/km^{2} (1,200/sq mi)
- Time zone: UTC+01:00 (CET)
  - Summer (DST): UTC+02:00 (CEST)
- Post Code: 5760 Røldal
- Climate: Dfc

Røldal is a village in Ullensvang Municipality in Vestland county, Norway. The village lies in the Røldal valley along the Storelva river on the north end of the lake Røldalsvatnet. Røldal is located about 35 kilometres (22 mi) southeast of the town of Odda. The 13th-century Røldal Stave Church is located here.

The village of Røldal was formerly part of the old Røldal Municipality from 1838 until 1964 when it became a part of Odda Municipality. Then in 2020, it became part of Ullensvang Municipality.

The village is located at the junction of the European route E134 highway and the Norwegian National Road 13. The E134 highway follows a historic route that connects Eastern and Western Norway, passing right through Røldal. It is located near the borders of three counties: Vestland, Rogaland (to the south), and Telemark (to the east).

The 0.68-square-kilometre (170-acre) village has a population (2025) of 313 and a population density of 683 inhabitants per square kilometre (1,770/sq mi).

== History ==
Due to its location near the border of three counties, the parish of Røldal has been part of three different dioceses over the centuries. It originally belonged to the Diocese of Bjørgvin, but it was transferred to the (new) Diocese of Stavanger in 1125. In 1684, it became a part of the (new) Diocese of Kristiansand. Røldal was finally transferred back to the Diocese of Bjørgvin in 1864.

Historically, the Røldal area was part of the parish of Suldal (to the south), with Røldal being an annex to the main parish. Suldal and Røldal each had their own churches, but they shared a priest since Røldal was a sparsely populated area and could not support their own priest. Suldal was located in Stavanger county and Røldal was located in Søndre Bergenhus county. In 1838, Røldal Municipality was established and it existed until 1964 when it was merged into Odda Municipality. In 2020, it became part of Ullensvang Municipality.

=== Name ===
The village is named after the old Røldal farm where the local church (Røldal Stave Church) is located. The farm was probably named after the valley in which it is located. The Old Norse form of the name might have been Rœrgudalr. The first element would then be the genitive case of the local rivername Røyrga (derived from røyrr which means 'rocky ground') and the last element is dalr which means 'dale' or 'valley'.

People from this area use the demonym røldøl for themselves, others who live outside of Røldal generally use the term røldøling.

== Attractions ==
Tourists visit Røldal for a number of reasons. The centuries-old Røldal Stave Church is a preserved museum, but it is also a regularly-used church for the village. The Røldal skicenter in the Hordadal valley is famous for receiving the most snowfall of any populated area in Norway. Røldal also is a point for access to the nearby Hardangervidda plateau. Other places of interest include the Røldal Village Museum (showing a traditional local farm), some iron-age burial mounds, and the Kalvatræet Literature House.
