= Hardanger District Court =

Former district court in Vestland, Norway

- Hardanger tingrett
- Interactive map of Hardanger District Court
- 60.3299255°N 6.6554903°E
- Established: 1919
- Dissolved: 26 April 2021
- Jurisdiction: Hardanger, Norway
- Location: Lofthus, Norway
- Coordinates: 60.3299255°N 6.6554903°E
- Appeals to: Gulating Court of Appeal

Hardanger District Court (Norwegian: Hardanger tingrett) was a district court in the Hardanger region of Vestland county, Norway. The court was based in the village of Lofthus in Ullensvang Municipality, but it also has courts in Norheimsund and Odda. The court existed from 1919 until 2021. It had jurisdiction over the municipalities of Eidfjord, Kvam, Ullensvang, and Ulvik. Cases from this court could be appealed to Gulating Court of Appeal.

The court was a court of first instance. Its judicial duties were mainly to settle criminal cases and to resolve civil litigation as well as bankruptcy. The administration and registration tasks of the court included death registration, issuing certain certificates, performing duties of a notary public, and officiating civil wedding ceremonies. Cases from this court were heard by a combination of professional judges and lay judges.

== History ==
The court was originally created in 1591. In 1695, this court merged with the Voss District Court to form the new Hardanger og Voss District Court. In 1919, the old Hardanger og Voss District Court was split (back) into two courts: Voss District Court (which included Eidfjord, Ulvik, Granvin, Voss, Vossestrand, and Evanger) and Hardanger District Court (including the municipalities of Jondal, Kvam, Odda, Ullensvang, and Røldal). At the same time in 1919, Strandebarm Municipality was moved from the Sunnhordland District Court to this court. On 1 January 2006, the old Voss District Court was closed with Voss Municipality moving to the Nordhordland District Court and Eidfjord Municipality, Ulvik Municipality, and Granvin Municipality joining this court. In 2019, jurisdiction over Granvin Municipality was transferred to the Bergen District Court because the municipality was to be merged with Voss Municipality which was already part of that court's jurisdiction. On 26 April 2021, Hardanger District Court was merged with the Bergen District Court to create the new Hordaland District Court.
