= Voss District Court =

Former district court in Norway

- Voss tingrett
- Interactive map of Voss District Court
- 60.6284408°N 6.4189610°E
- Established: 1919
- Dissolved: 1 January 2006
- Jurisdiction: Voss
- Location: Vossavangen, Norway
- Coordinates: 60.6284408°N 6.4189610°E
- Appeals to: Gulating Court of Appeal

Voss District Court (Norwegian: Voss tingrett) was a district court in the greater Voss region of Vestland county, Norway. The court was based in the village of Vossavangen. The court existed from 1919 until 2006. It had jurisdiction over the municipalities of Voss, Eidfjord, Granvin, and Ulvik. Cases from this court could be appealed to Gulating Court of Appeal.

The court was a court of first instance. Its judicial duties were mainly to settle criminal cases and to resolve civil litigation as well as bankruptcy. The administration and registration tasks of the court included death registration, issuing certain certificates, performing duties of a notary public, and officiating civil wedding ceremonies. Cases from this court were heard by a combination of professional judges and lay judges.

== History ==
The court was originally created in 1591. In 1695, this court merged with the Hardanger District Court to form the new Hardanger og Voss District Court. In 1919, the old Hardanger og Voss District Court was split (back) into two courts: Voss District Court (which included Eidfjord, Ulvik, Granvin, Voss, Vossestrand, and Evanger) and Hardanger District Court (including the municipalities of Jondal, Kvam, Odda, Ullensvang, and Røldal). On 1 January 2006, this court was closed and Voss Municipality was moved to the Nordhordland District Court and the municipalities of Eidfjord, Ulvik, and Granvin became part of the Hardanger District Court.
