= Hordaland District Court =

First-instance law court in Norway

- Hordaland tingrett
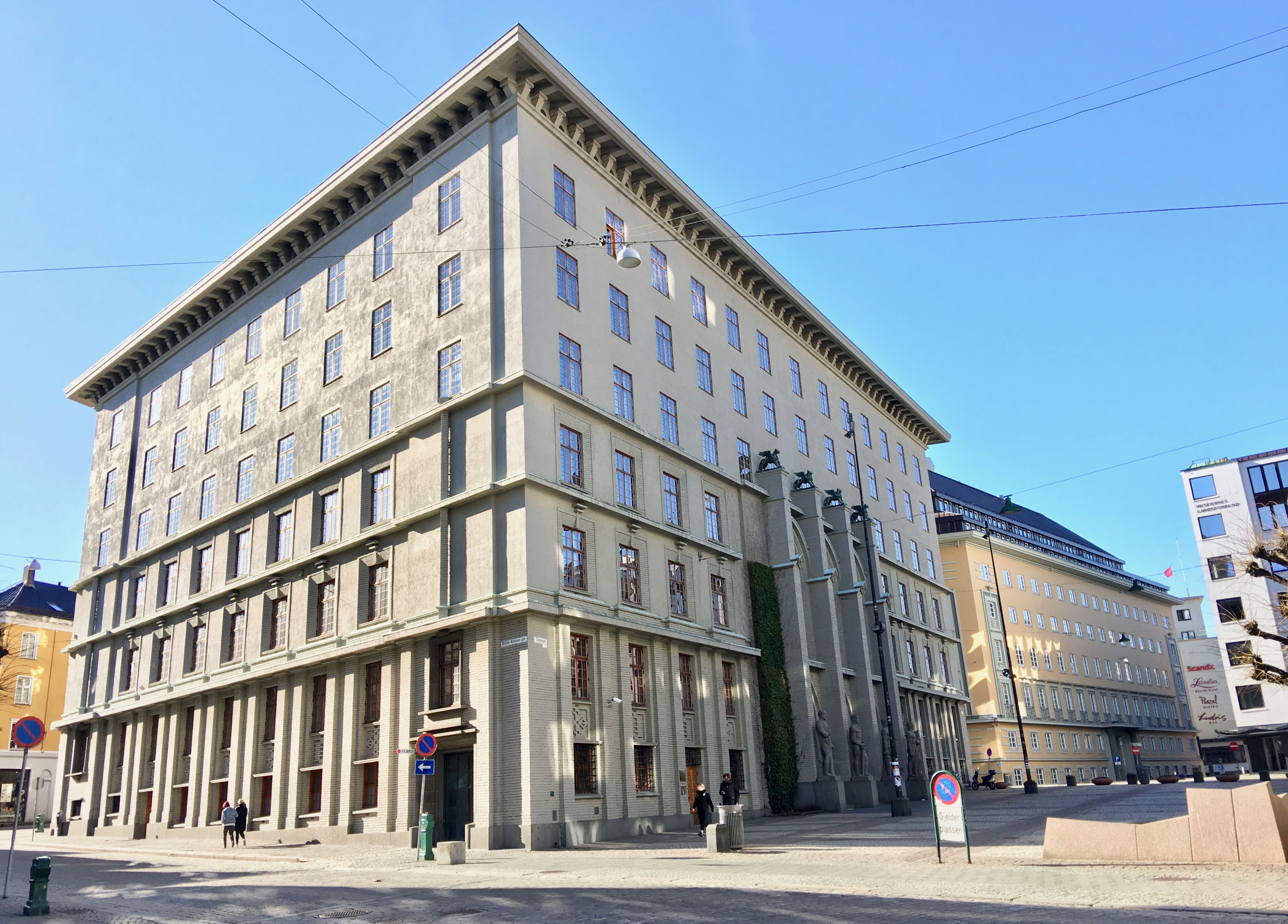
- The courthouse in Bergen
- 60°23′36″N 5°18′59″E
- Established: 26 April 2021
- Jurisdiction: Hordaland, Norway
- Location: Bergen
- Coordinates: 60°23′36″N 5°18′59″E
- Appeals to: Gulating Court of Appeal
- Website: Official website

Hordaland District Court (Norwegian: Hordaland tingrett) is a district court located in Vestland county, Norway. This court is based at a courthouse in Bergen. The court serves the Nordhordland and Midthordland areas of the county which includes cases from 12 municipalities. The court is subordinate to the Gulating Court of Appeal. The court accepts cases from the municipalities of Alver, Askøy, Austevoll, Austrheim, Bergen, Bjørnafjorden, Fedje, Masfjorden, Modalen, Osterøy, Vaksdal, and Øygarden.

The court is led by a chief judge (sorenskriver) and several other judges. The court is a court of first instance. Its judicial duties are mainly to settle criminal cases and to resolve civil litigation as well as bankruptcy. The administration and registration tasks of the court include death registration, issuing certain certificates, performing duties of a notary public, and officiating civil wedding ceremonies. Cases from this court are heard by a combination of professional judges and lay judges.

== History ==
This court was established on 26 April 2021 after the old Bergen District Court and Hardanger District Court were merged into one court. Originally, this court was based at two different courthouses which were located in Bergen and Lofthus. The court in Bergen served the Nordhordland and Midthordland areas while the court in Lofthus served the Hardanger area. On 10 June 2025, the district court was divided into two separate district courts. The courthouse in Lofthus became the new Hardanger og Voss District Court, serving all of Hardanger plus Voss Municipality and Samnanger Municipality. The other areas remained as part of the Hordaland District Court which was still based in Bergen.
