= Carl Fridtjof Rode =

Norwegian judge and politician

Carl Fridtjof Rode (19 May 1897 – 1984) was a Norwegian judge.

He was born in Kristiania, and after a military education he graduated with the cand.jur. degree in 1922. He worked as an attorney in Melbu, and was a member of the municipal council of Hadsel Municipality. On 1 February 1942, during the occupation of Norway by Nazi Germany, he was arrested by the Nazi authorities for working in an "export organization". He was imprisoned at Grini from April to June 1942, and then sat at Schildberg until the camp was liberated. On returning to Norway, he was appointed as district stipendiary magistrate in Vesterålen.

He became district stipendiary magistrate in Midhordland in 1953, and acting Supreme Court Justice the next year. He got the Supreme Court Justice position on a permanent basis in 1956, and stood in the position until his retirement.
