= Midthordland District Court =

Former district court in Norway

- Midthordland tingrett
- 60°23′37″N 5°19′18″E
- Established: 1 Jan 1848
- Dissolved: 1 Jan 2006
- Jurisdiction: Midthordland
- Location: Bergen, Norway
- Coordinates: 60°23′37″N 5°19′18″E
- Appeals to: Gulating Court of Appeal

Midthordland District Court (Norwegian: Midthordland tingrett) was a district court in Hordaland county, Norway. The court was based in Bergen. The court existed until 2006. It had jurisdiction over the Midthordland area which included the municipalities of Austevoll, Sund, Fjell, Askøy, Os, Fusa, and Samnanger. Cases from this court could be appealed to Gulating Court of Appeal.

The court was a court of first instance. Its judicial duties were mainly to settle criminal cases and to resolve civil litigation as well as bankruptcy. The administration and registration tasks of the court included death registration, issuing certain certificates, performing duties of a notary public, and officiating civil wedding ceremonies. Cases from this court were heard by a combination of professional judges and lay judges.

== History ==
The court was created on 1 January 1848 by taking some of the geographical areas of jurisdiction from the Nordhordland District Court and Sunnhordland District Court. On 1 July 1955, this court's jurisdiction was divided with the Austevoll, Sund, Fjell, Askøy, and Laksevåg areas becoming part of the Sotra District Court. On 1 September 1972, the Sotra District Court was closed. The Laksevåg area became part of the Bergen District Court and the rest of that area merged back into the Midthordland District Court. On 1 January 2006, Midthordland District Court was closed and merged into the Nordhordland District Court.
