= Søråsen =

Mountain in Vestland, Norway

Highest point
- Elevation: 120 m (390 ft)
- Prominence: 70 m (230 ft)
- Isolation: 1.7 km (1.1 mi)
- Coordinates: 60°18′07″N 5°19′14″E

Geography
- Location: Vestland, Norway

Søråsen is a large hill in Bergen Municipality in Vestland county, Norway. It is located south of the Nesttun neighborhood near the European route E39 highway.

== See also ==
- List of mountains of Norway by height
