= Brudesløret =

Waterfall in Vestland, Norway

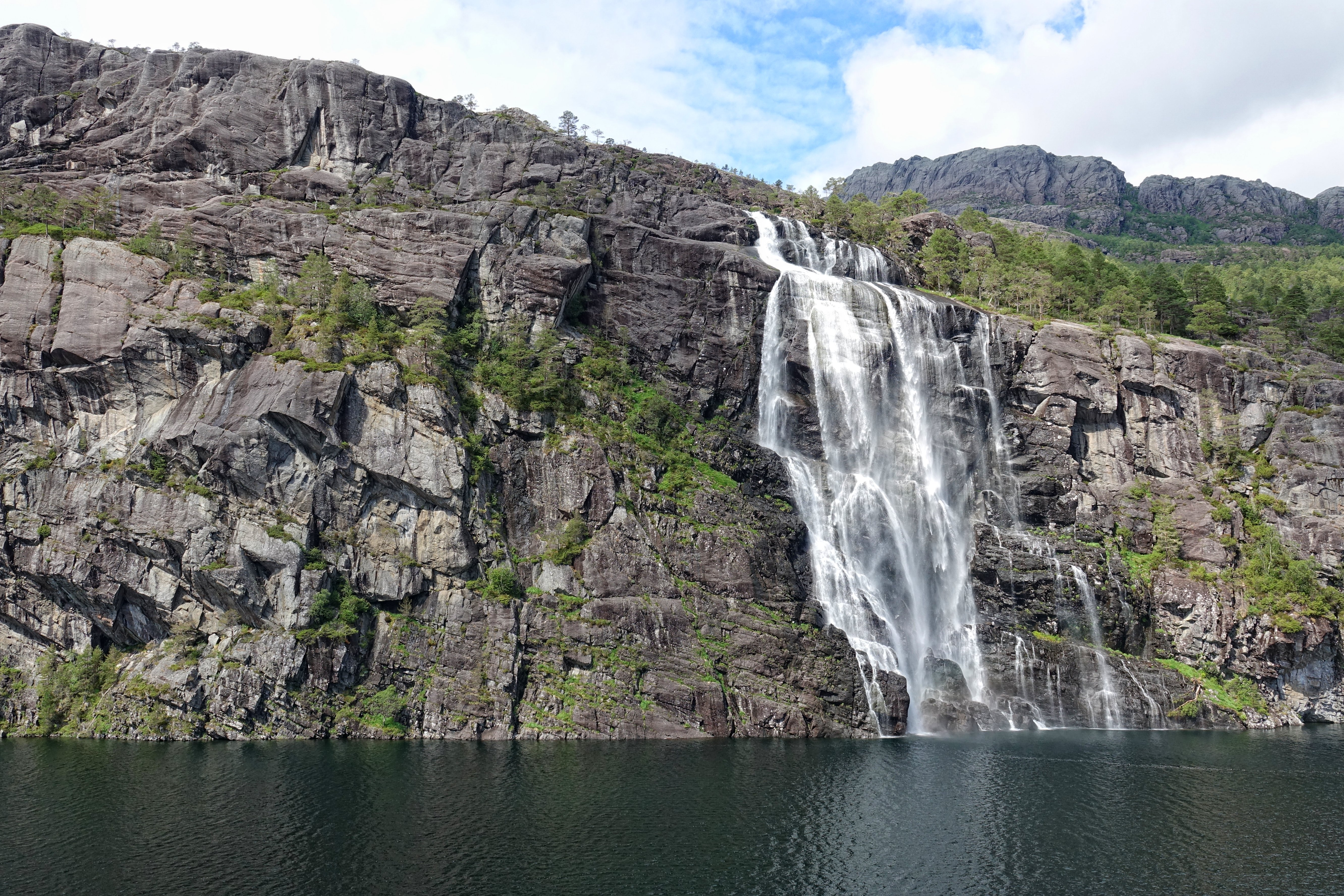
- Interactive map of Brudesløret
- Location: Vestland, Norway
- Coordinates: 61.6426°N 5.2876°E
- Type: Horsetail
- Total height: 110 metres (360 ft)
- Number of drops: 1
- Longest drop: 110 metres (360 ft)
- Average width: 15 metres (49 ft)

Brudesløret is a waterfall in Haukå which is located in Kinn Municipality in Vestland county, Norway. It is located near Norwegian county road 614, just north of the Norddalsfjorden. The waterfall is about 110 metres (360 ft) high, and about 15 metres (49 ft) wide. It is a single-drop horsetail waterfall.

== See also ==
- List of waterfalls
