= Elsa Garmann Andersen =

Norwegian architect and photographer (1891-1964)

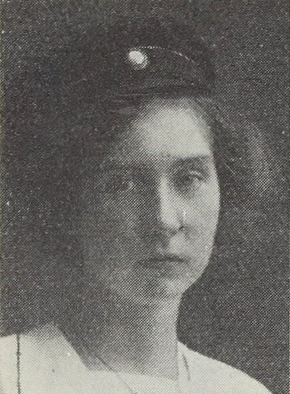
- Born: 21 November 1891; Bergen
- Died: 12 September 1964 (aged 72); Bergen
- Education: Norwegian University of Science and Technology

Elsa Garmann Andersen (21 November 1891 – 12 September 1964), sometimes referred to as Elsa Garmann-Anderssen, was a Norwegian amateur photographer active in Bergen's Camera Club in the late 1920s. She was a qualified architect from the Norwegian University of Science and Technology but never practiced her profession, probably due to health problems.

== Works ==
Andersen's range of subjects was landscape, portrait, architecture, street photography, and still life. Most of all, she photographed the landscape in Hardanger, with which she had a close relationship. She had an uncle who was a district doctor in Lofthus, and she lived in his house every summer. The way she photographed was similar to what was common for amateur photographers in the 1920s and 1930s. The camera clubs had their own aesthetics where they drew inspiration from the art of painting, and left parts of the image blurred and diffused.
