= Hardanger and Voss District Court =

First-instance law court in Norway

- Hardanger og Voss tingrett
- Interactive map of Hardanger and Voss; District Court
- 60°19′48″N 6°39′20″E
- Established: 10 June 2025
- Jurisdiction: Greater Hardanger region
- Location: Lofthus, Norway
- Coordinates: 60°19′48″N 6°39′20″E
- Appeals to: Gulating Court of Appeal
- Website: Official website

Hardanger and Voss District Court (Norwegian: Hardanger og Voss tingrett) is a district court located in Vestland county, Norway. This court is based in Lofthus (there are also courthouses in Norheimsund and Odda that are available to use). The court is subordinate to the Gulating Court of Appeal. The court serves the greater Hardanger region of the county which includes cases from six municipalities: Eidfjord, Kvam, Samnanger, Ullensvang, Ulvik, and Voss.

The court is led by a chief judge (sorenskriver) and several other judges. The court is a court of first instance. Its judicial duties are mainly to settle criminal cases and to resolve civil litigation as well as bankruptcy. The administration and registration tasks of the court include death registration, issuing certain certificates, performing duties of a notary public, and officiating civil wedding ceremonies. Cases from this court are heard by a combination of professional judges and lay judges.

== History ==
This court was established on 10 June 2025 after the Hordaland District Court was divided into two district courts. The Hordaland District Court was established in 2021 and it had two courthouses, one in Bergen and one in Lofthus. The court in Lofthus had jurisdiction over the Hardanger region (the municipalities of Eidfjord, Kvam, Ullensvang, and Ulvik). On 10 June 2025, the court in Lofthus was created as a separate district court with jurisdiction over the whole Hardanger region plus the neighboring Voss Municipality and Samnanger Municipality.
