= Lofthus, Vestland =

Village in Ullensvang Municipality, Norway

Lofthus
- Village
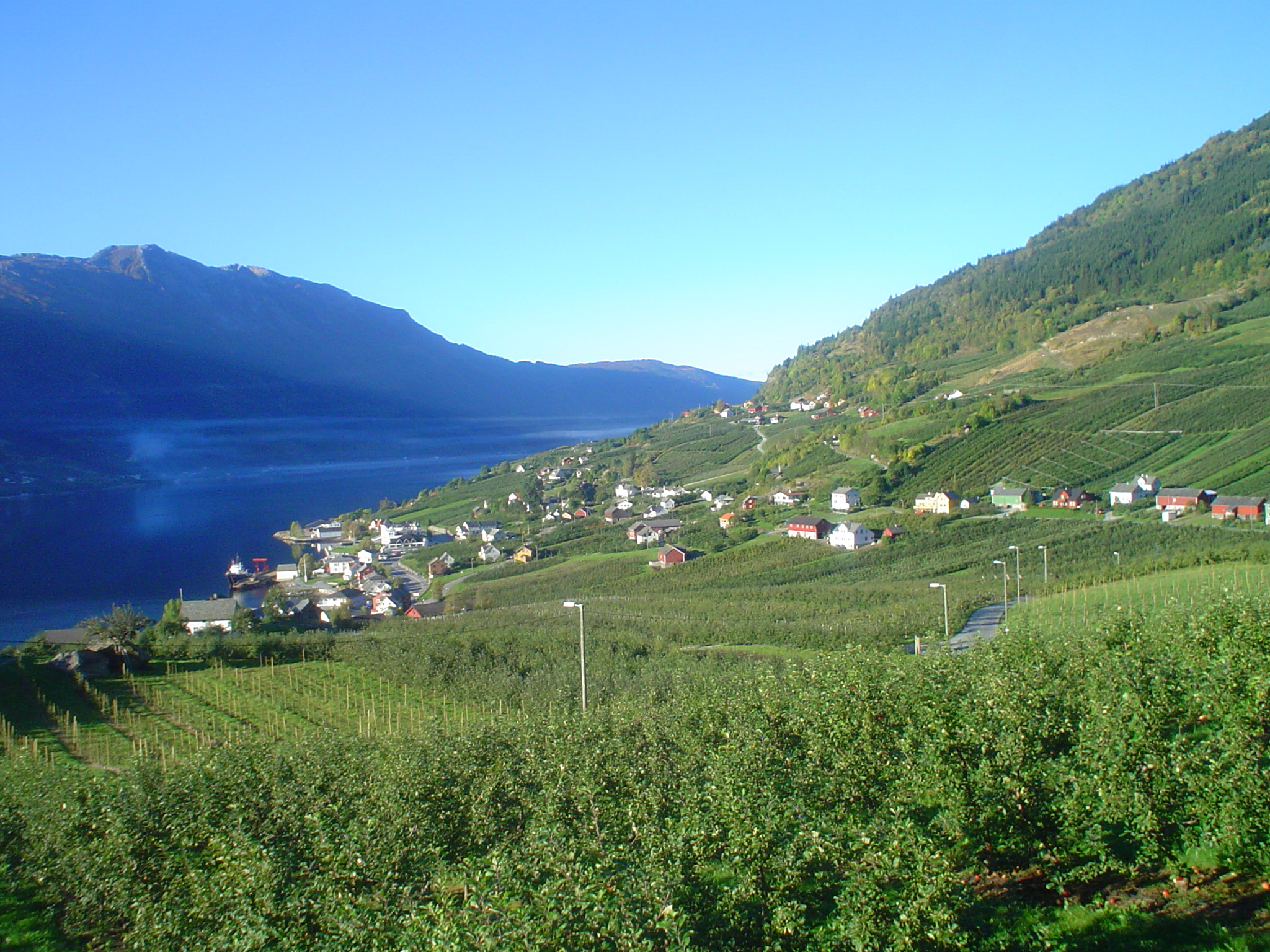
- View of the village
- Interactive map of Lofthus
- Coordinates: 60.32464°N 6.65829°E
- Country: Norway
- Region: Western Norway
- County: Vestland
- District: Hardanger
- Municipality: Ullensvang Municipality

Area
  - Total: 0.88 km^{2} (0.34 sq mi)
- Elevation: 2 m (6.6 ft)

Population (2025)
  - Total: 601
  - Density: 683/km^{2} (1,770/sq mi)
- Time zone: UTC+01:00 (CET)
  - Summer (DST): UTC+02:00 (CEST)
- Post Code: 5781 Lofthus

Lofthus is a village in Ullensvang Municipality, which is located in the Hardanger region of Vestland county, Norway. The village lies along the eastern shore of the Sørfjorden, along Norwegian National Road 13. Lofthus is located about 10 kilometres (6.2 mi) south of the village of Kinsarvik and about 30 kilometres (19 mi) north of the town of Odda.

The 0.88-square-kilometre (220-acre) village of Lofthus has a population (2025) of 601, giving the village a population density of 683 inhabitants per square kilometre (1,770/sq mi).

Lofthus is a tourist area with hotels and camping sites. There is also a significant amount of fruit farming in the area, and so Lofthus is home to a national fruit research centre. The most popular fruit grown in this area is the cherry. The medieval Ullensvang Church is located in this village, as is the Hardanger folk high school. The Hordaland District Court, which is based in Bergen, has a courthouse in Lofthus.

== Notable people ==
Notable people that were born or lived in Lofthus include:

- Halldor O. Opedal (1895–1986), a folkorist
- Elsa Garmann Andersen (1891–1964), an architect and photographer

== Media gallery ==
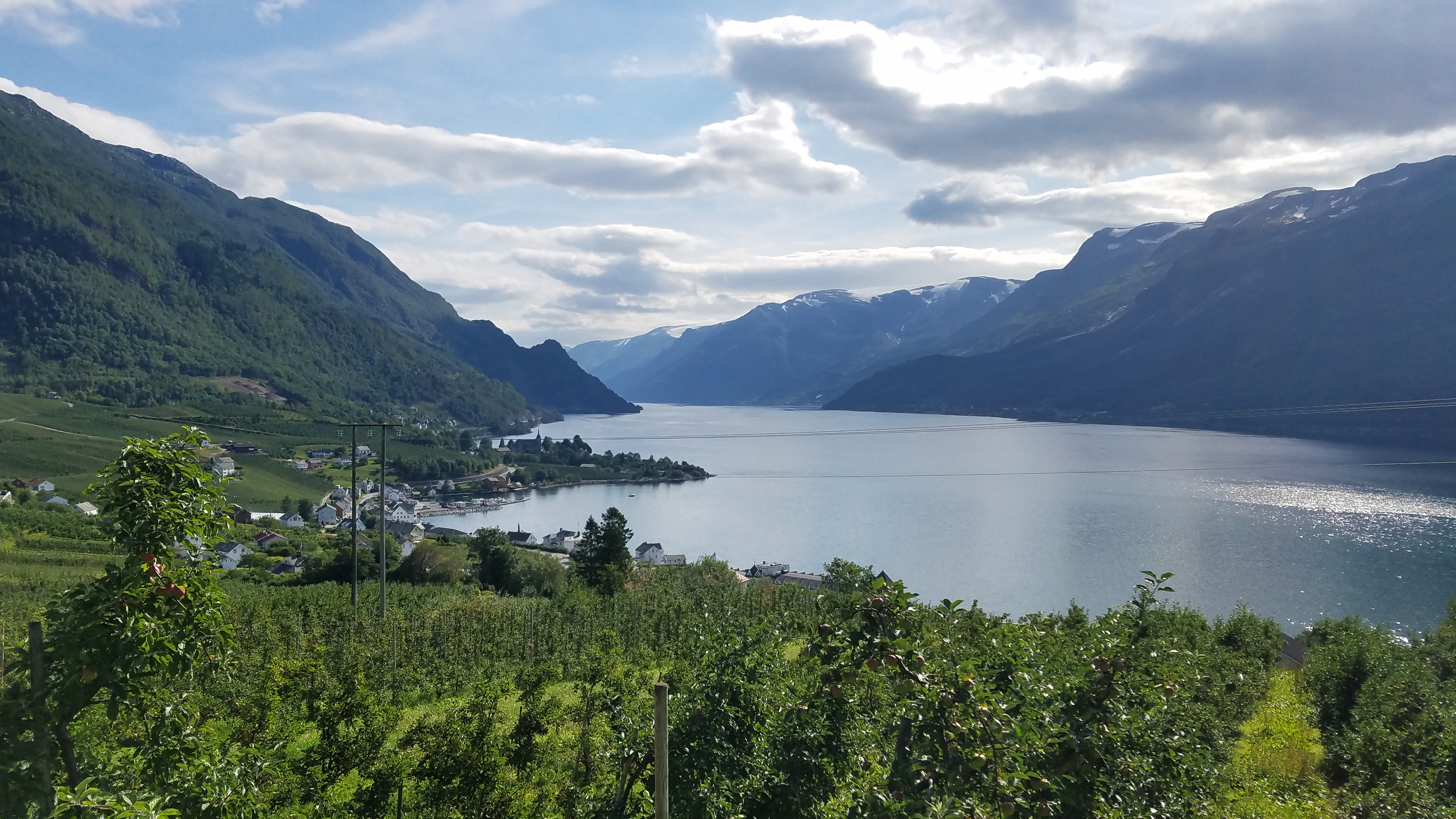
View of Lofthus

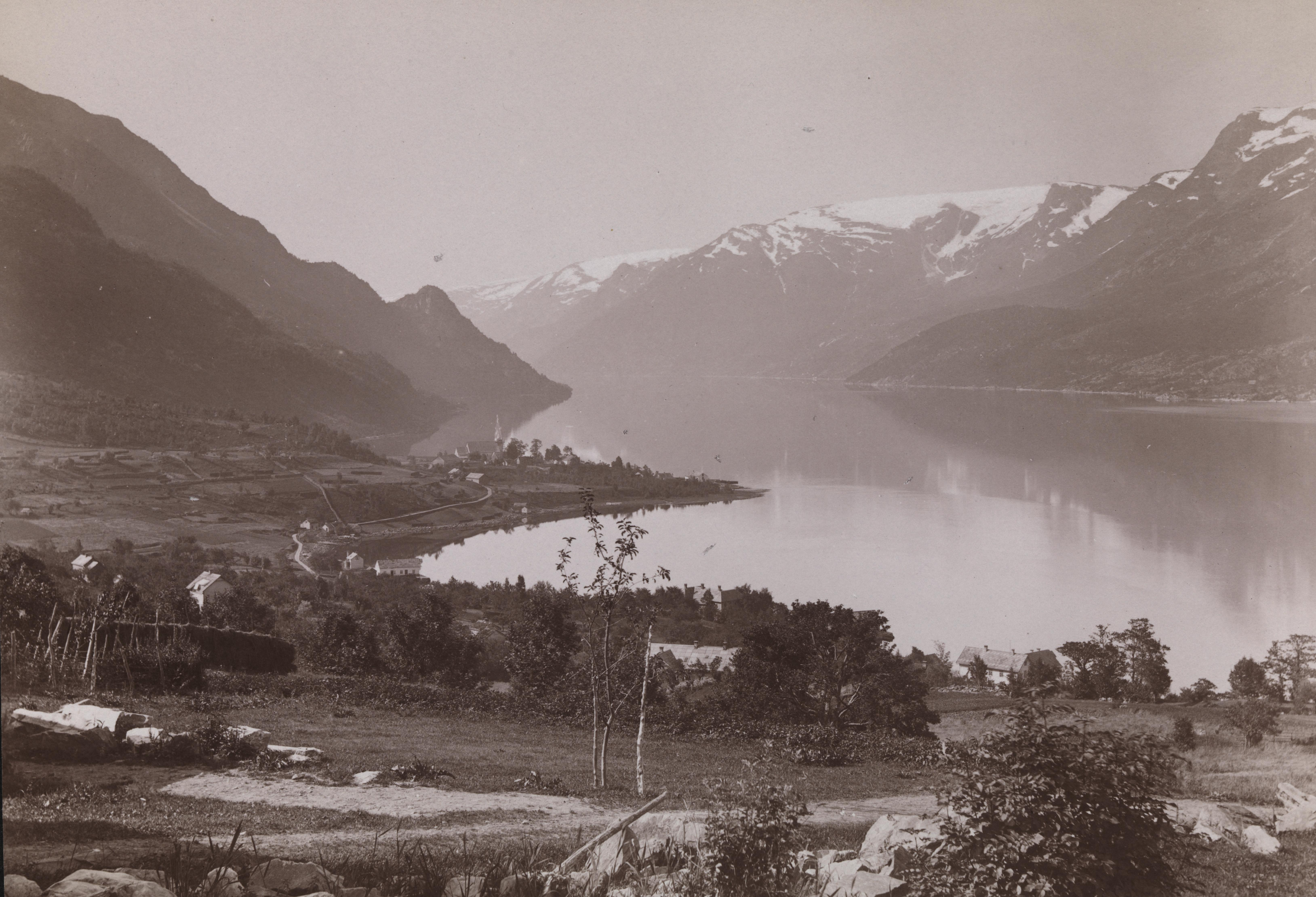
Old picture of Lofthus

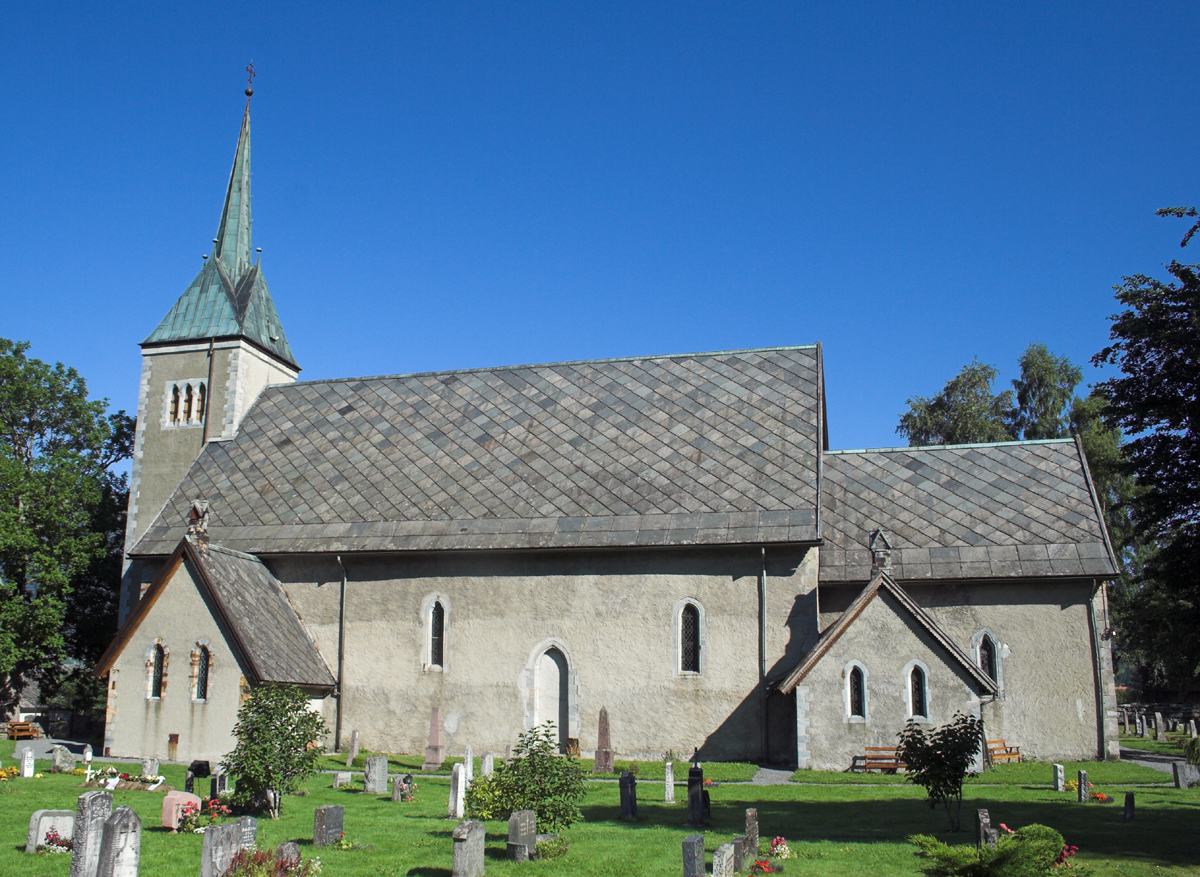
The medieval Ullensvang Church
