= Bergen District Court =

Former district court in Vestland, Norway

- Bergen tingrett
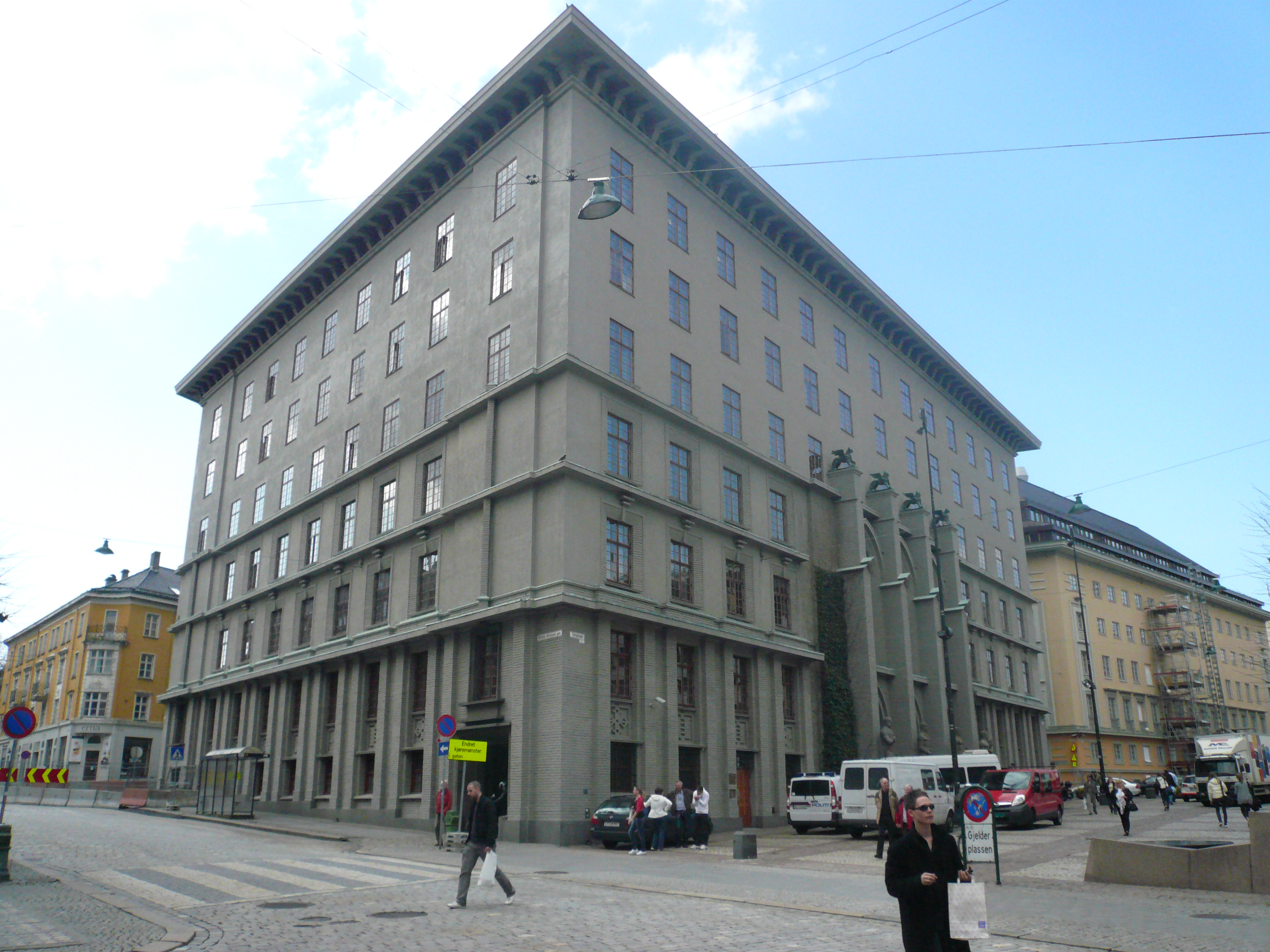
- Bergen Courthouse
- 60.393547°N 5.3216171°E
- Established: 1591
- Dissolved: 26 April 2021
- Jurisdiction: Nordhordland
- Location: Bergen, Norway
- Coordinates: 60.393547°N 5.3216171°E
- Appeals to: Gulating Court of Appeal

Bergen District Court (Norwegian: Bergen tingrett) was a district court in Vestland county, Norway. The court was based in the city of Bergen at the Bergen Courthouse at Tårnplads 2 in Bergen. The court existed until 2021. It had jurisdiction over the Nordhordland, Midhordland, and Voss regions in the county. This included the municipalities of Gulen, Fedje, Austrheim, Masfjorden, Modalen, Alver, Askøy, Øygarden, Osterøy, Vaksdal, Voss, Austevoll, Bjørnafjorden, Samnanger, and Bergen. Cases from this court could be appealed to Gulating Court of Appeal.

The court was a court of first instance. Its judicial duties were mainly to settle criminal cases and to resolve civil litigation as well as bankruptcy. The administration and registration tasks of the court included death registration, issuing certain certificates, performing duties of a notary public, and officiating civil wedding ceremonies. Cases from this court were heard by a combination of professional judges and lay judges.

== Courthouse ==
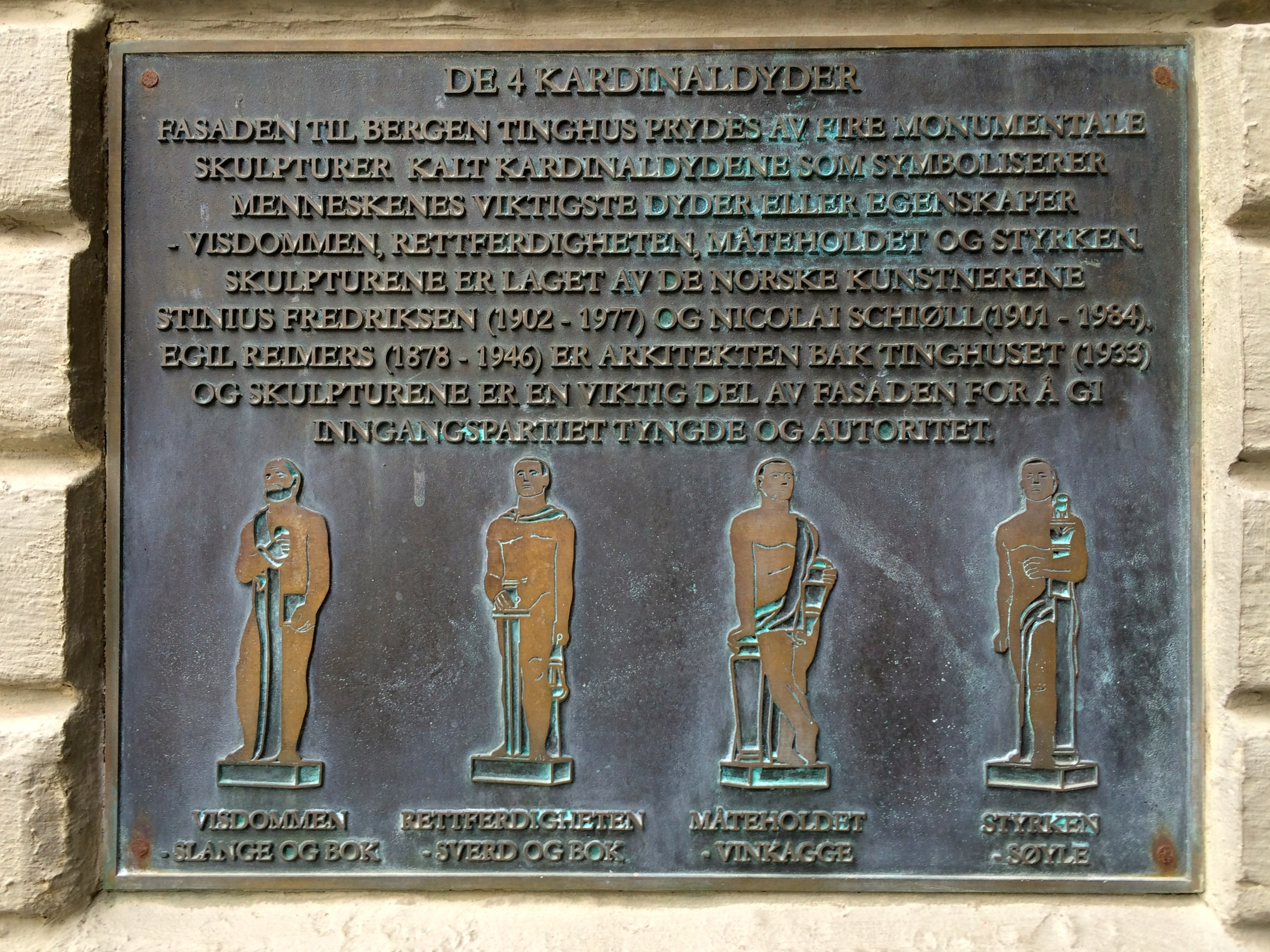
Plaque at the main entrance of Bergen Tinghus

Bergen Tinghus was designed by architect Egill Reimers in a neoclassical style during 1933 and it is considered one of his main works. The brick building has 25 courtrooms covering six floors plus basement and loft. At the main entrance on Tårnplass, there are four granite statues representing the cardinal virtues: wisdom, justice, moderation and strength. The sculptures were designed by artists Nic Schiøll and Stinius Fredriksen.

== History ==
The court was originally established in 1591 as the civil and criminal court for the city of Bergen. In 2006, this court was merged with the Bergen byfogdembete (city attorney's office) which added the authority for bankruptcy, probate, property and other types of cases. On 1 January 2017, the Nordhordland District Court was merged with this court, vastly expanding the area of its jurisdiction. On 26 April 2021, the Bergen District Court was merged with the Hardanger District Court to create the new Hordaland District Court.
