= Vestland =

County in Western Norway

Vestland County Vestland fylke
- County
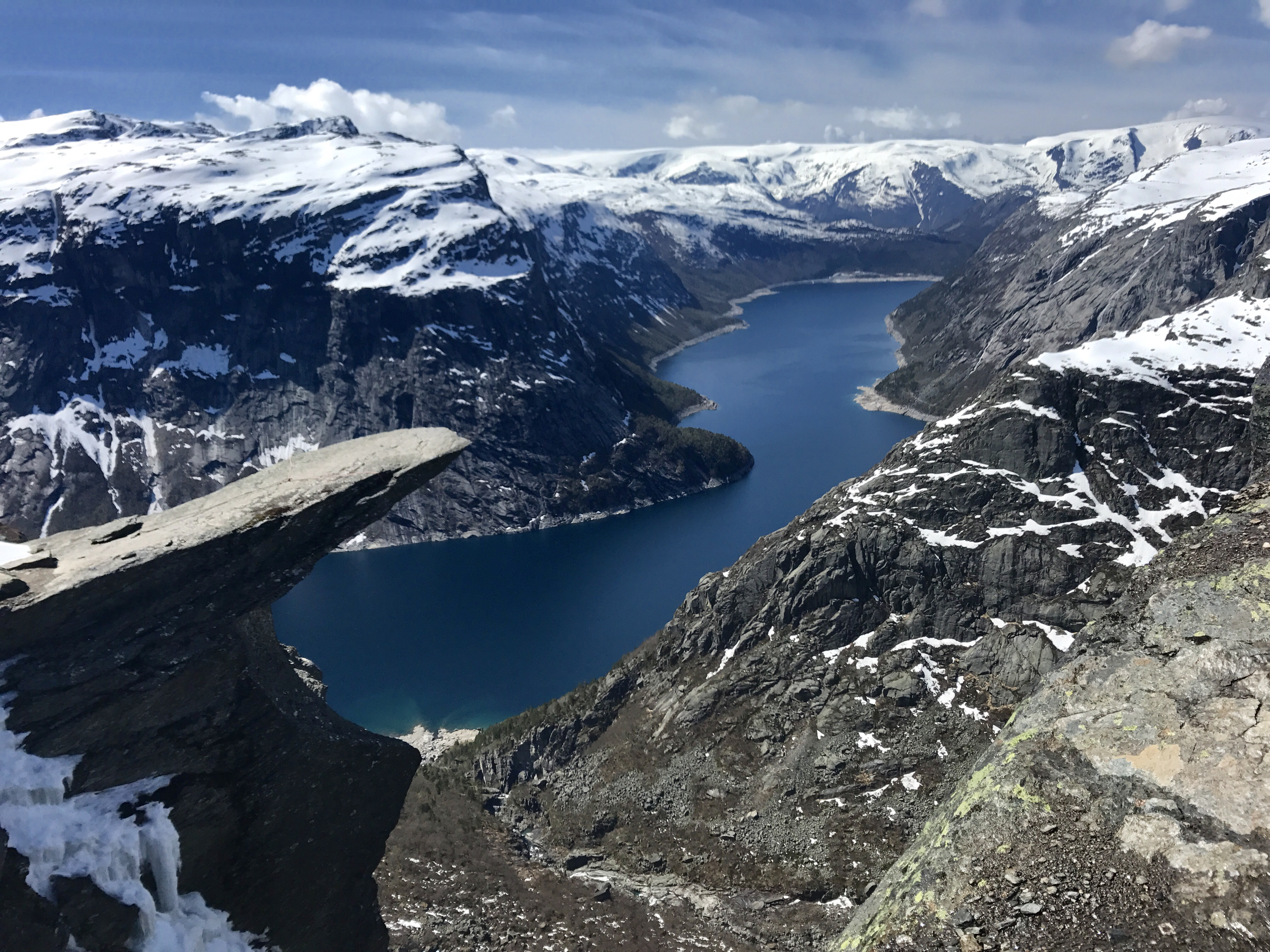
- Trolltunga and Ringedalsvatnet

- Flag Coat of arms

- Vestland within Norway
- Coordinates: 60°55′30″N 6°26′42″E
- Country: Norway
- County: Vestland
- District: Western Norway
- Established: 1 January 2020
  - Preceded by: Hordaland and Sogn og Fjordane counties
- Administrative centre: Bergen

Government
  - Body: Vestland County Municipality
  - Governor (2022): Liv Signe Navarsete (Sp)
  - County mayor (2020): Jon Askeland (Sp)

Area
  - Total: 33,871 km^{2} (13,078 sq mi)
  - Land: 31,969 km^{2} (12,343 sq mi)
  - Water: 1,902 km^{2} (734 sq mi) 5.6%
  - Rank: #5 in Norway

Population (2021)
  - Total: 638,821
  - Rank: #3 in Norway
  - Density: 20/km^{2} (52/sq mi)
  - Change (10 years): ▲ +8.1%
- Demonym: Vestlending

Official language
  - Norwegian form: Nynorsk
- Time zone: UTC+01:00 (CET)
  - Summer (DST): UTC+02:00 (CEST)
- ISO 3166 code: NO-46
- Website: Official website

Vestland is a county in Norway. The county is located in Western Norway, and its administrative centre is Bergen, where the executive and political leadership is based. The County Governor is based in Hermansverk. Vestland is one of two counties in Norway that have Nynorsk as their official written language form.

Vestland was created on 1 January 2020, when the former counties of Hordaland and Sogn og Fjordane were merged. (Note: Hornindal Municipality, which previously lay in Sogn og Fjordane, became a part of Volda Municipality in Møre og Romsdal.)

== History ==
Vestland county is a newly created county, but it has been inhabited for millennia. The area was made up of many petty kingdoms under the Gulating during the Middle Ages. The northern part was then known as Firdafylke (now the Fjordane region; Nordfjord-Sunnfjord), the central area was known as Sygnafylke (now the Sogn region), and the southern part was known as Hordafylke.

In the early 16th century, Norway was divided into four len. The Bergenhus len was headquartered in Bergen and encompassed much of western and northern Norway including Firdafylke, Sygnafylke, Hordafylke, and Sunnmørafylke (in the present day Møre og Romsdal county). The new Bergenhus len was administered from the Bergenhus Fortress in the city of Bergen.

In 1662, the lens were replaced by amts. On 19 February 1662, a royal decree changed the name to Bergenhus amt. The new Bergenhus amt originally consisted of the present-day areas of Vestland and the Sunnmøre region of Møre og Romsdal, plus the far northern Nordlandene amt was subordinate to Bergenhus amt. The Sunnmøre region was transferred to Romsdalen amt in 1689 and the Nordlandene amt was separated around that time as well.

In 1763, the amt was divided into northern and southern parts: Nordre Bergenhus amt and Søndre Bergenhus amt. When the amt was split, the present day Gulen Municipality was split with the southern part ending up in Søndre Bergenhus amt. In 1773, the border was re-drawn so that all of Gulen was located in the northern part.

On 1 January 1919, Nordre Bergenhus amt was renamed Sogn og Fjordane fylke and Søndre Bergenhus amt was renamed Hordaland fylke during a period of time when many location names in Norway were changed.

The city of Bergen was removed from the Bergenhus amt in 1831 and it was classified as a city-county (byamt) from 1831 to 1972. During that time in 1915, Årstad Municipality was annexed into Bergen. In 1972, the neighbouring Arna Municipality, Fana Municipality, Laksevåg Municipality and Åsane Municipality were annexed into the city of Bergen to create a large Bergen Municipality. Also at that same time, the city of Bergen lost its county status, and became a part of Hordaland county once again.

On 1 January 2020, Hordaland and Sogn og Fjordane counties were merged back together once again, forming Vestland county.

== Geography ==
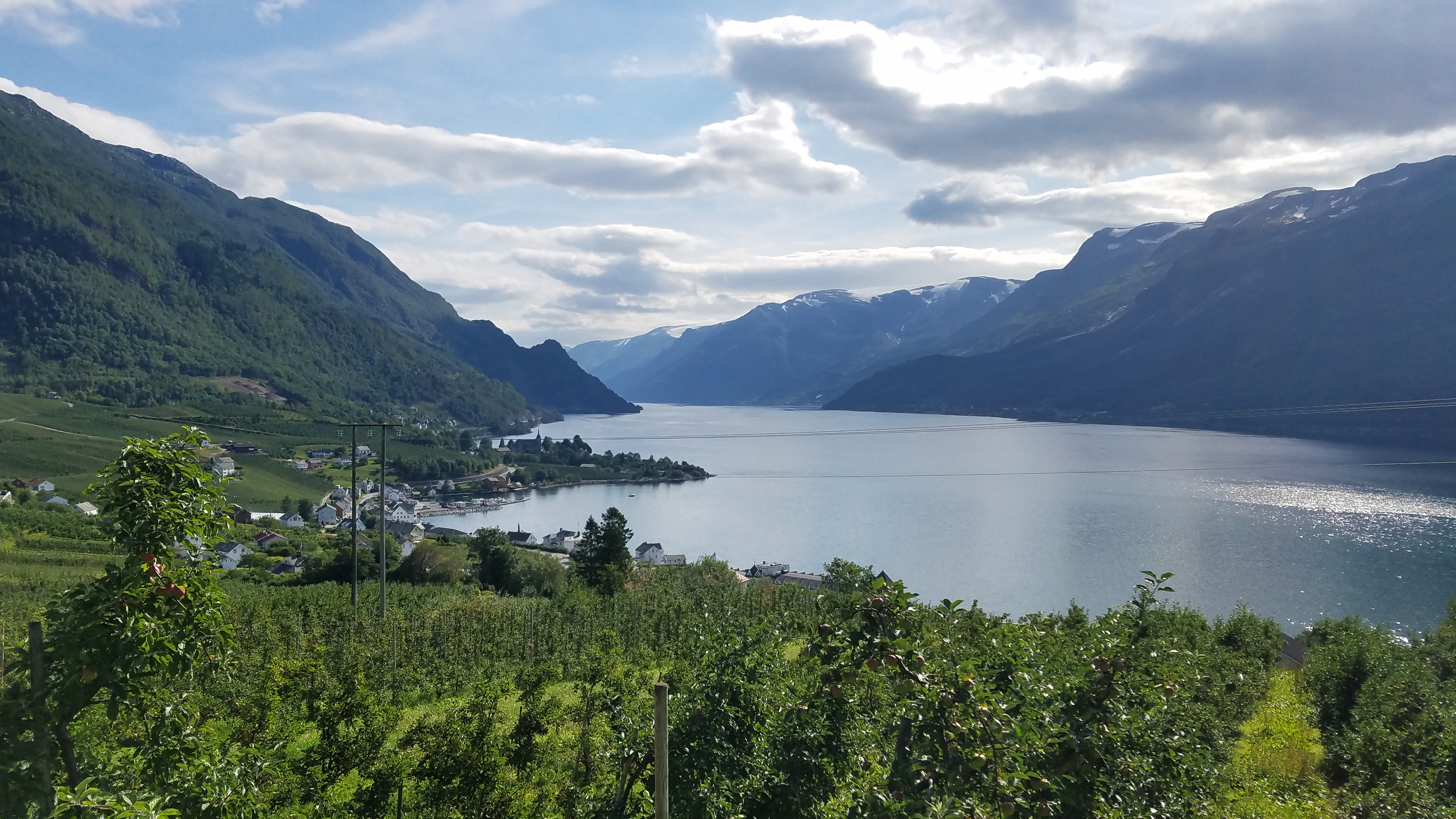
Hardanger is one of Norway's most important sources of fruit, providing about 40% of Norway's fruit production, including apples, plums, pears, cherries, and redcurrants.

Vestland is located on the western coast of Norway. It is split up by several long, deep fjords including the Nordfjorden, Sognefjorden, and Hardangerfjorden, some of Norway's most notable fjords and great tourist attractions. About half of the Hardangervidda National Park is in the county. It also includes the Jostedal, Folgefonna, and Hardangerjøkulen glaciers. The county also includes many well-known waterfalls, such as Vøringsfossen, Brudesløret and Stykkjedalsfossen. Ramnefjellsfossen (previously called Utigardfossen) is the tallest in Norway and third tallest in the world and Vettisfossen is one of Norway's highest waterfalls with a vertical drop of 275 m (902 ft). Both are located in the Jotunheimen mountains.

Outside of the Bergen metropolitan area, the county is mostly a rural area with a scattered population. Cruise ships visit Vestland all summer because of the unique vistas of high mountains and deep blue fjords. The famous Nærøyfjord is located in the central part of the county. This is a UNESCO listed fjord area. There are several archipelagos, including Øygarden, Austevoll, Bulandet, Bremangerlandet, and Kinn. The westernmost point in Norway proper is Holmebåen in Solund municipality. The island of Unst, part of Shetland Islands is around 300 km (190 mi) west of Holmebåen.

The terrain changes quite rapidly with mostly smaller mountains on the coastline, gradually increasing to mountains reaching more than 2,000 m (6,600 ft). Because of the steep rise in elevation and fjords cutting through the terrain, the amount of precipitation is very high. Low pressure systems come in from the west and meet the mountains (a phenomenon known as orographic lifting) and cause rain and snowfall.

== Government ==
The Vestland County Municipality is the elected administration of the county. It is led by the county council (Norwegian: fylkesting) of 65 members. Heading the county council is the county mayor (Norwegian: fylkesordførar). Since 2020, the county mayor of Vestland County Municipality has been Jon Askeland.

The county also has a county governor (Norwegian: statsforvaltar) who is the representative of the King and Government of Norway. Lars Sponheim is the current County Governor of Vestland and this office is based in Hermansverk.

The municipalities in Vestland are divided among several district courts (Norwegian: tingrett): Nordhordland District Court, Sunnhordland District Court, Bergen District Court, Hardanger District Court, and Sogn og Fjordane District Court. All of these courts are subordinate to the Gulating Court of Appeal district based in Bergen.

Vestland is not an electoral district for elections to the Storting, as Hordaland and Sogn og Fjordane remain as separate districts.

== Media gallery ==
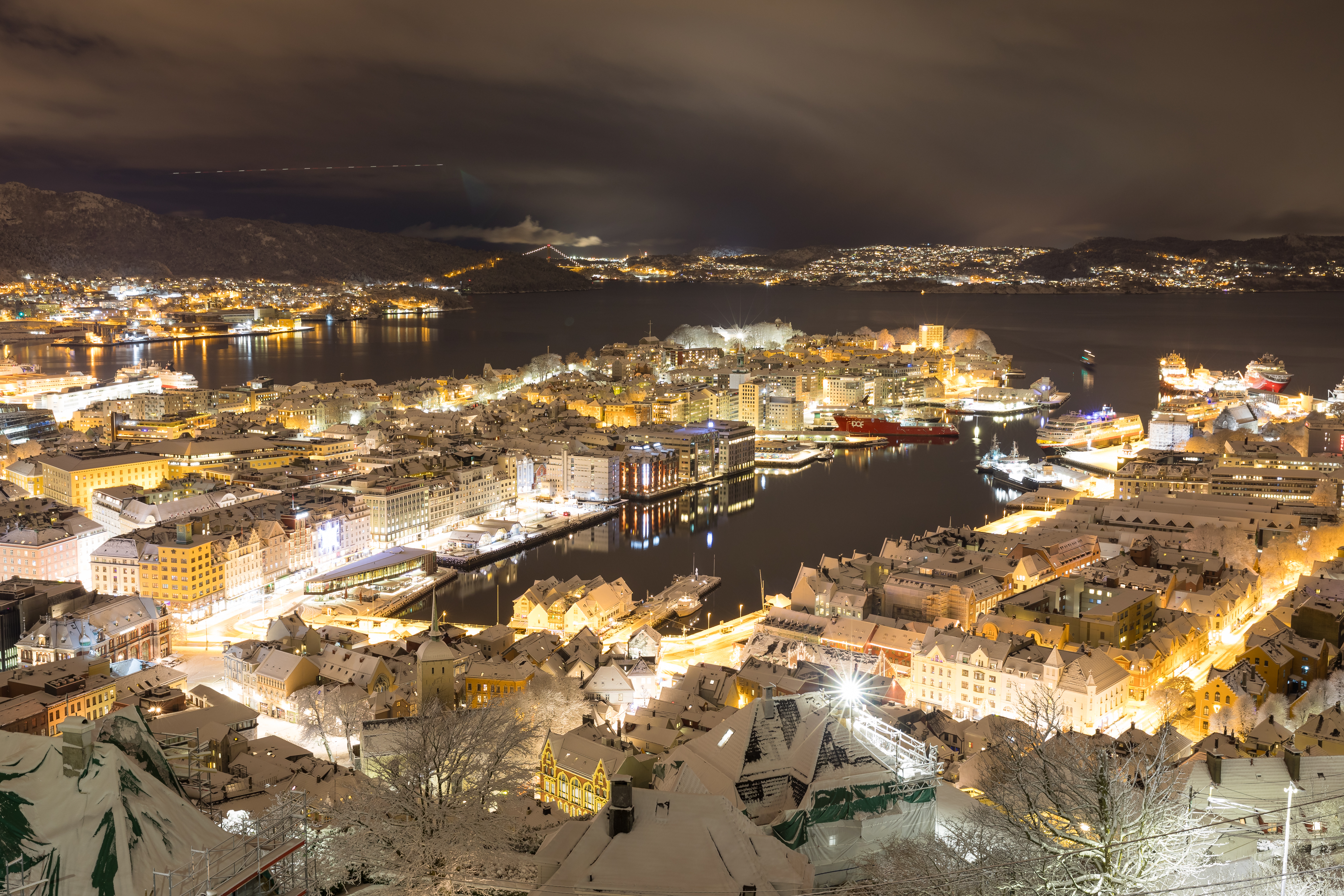
Bergen city centre and harbour photographed from Skansen on a winter night

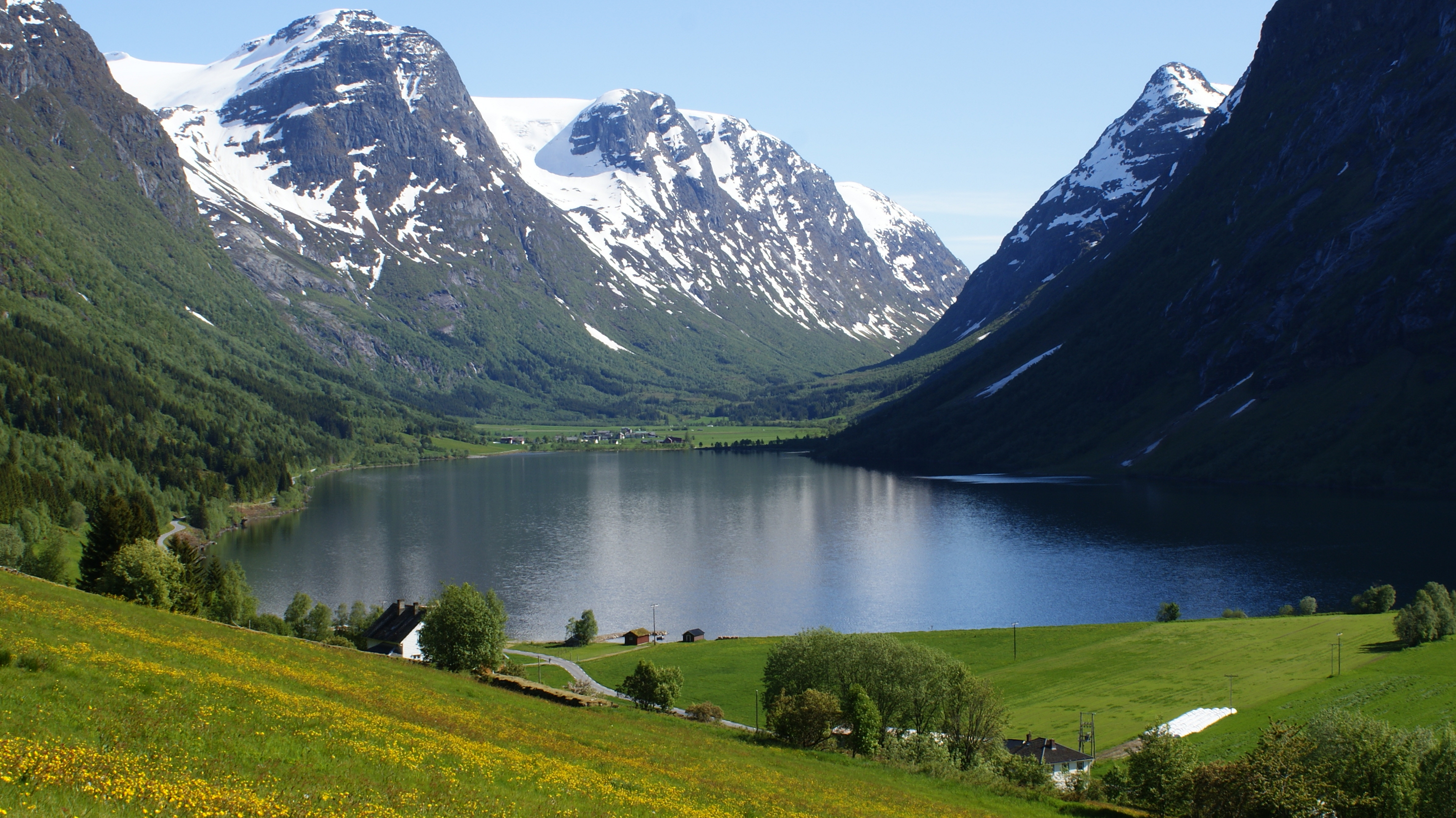
Myklebustdalen valley east of Byrkjelo

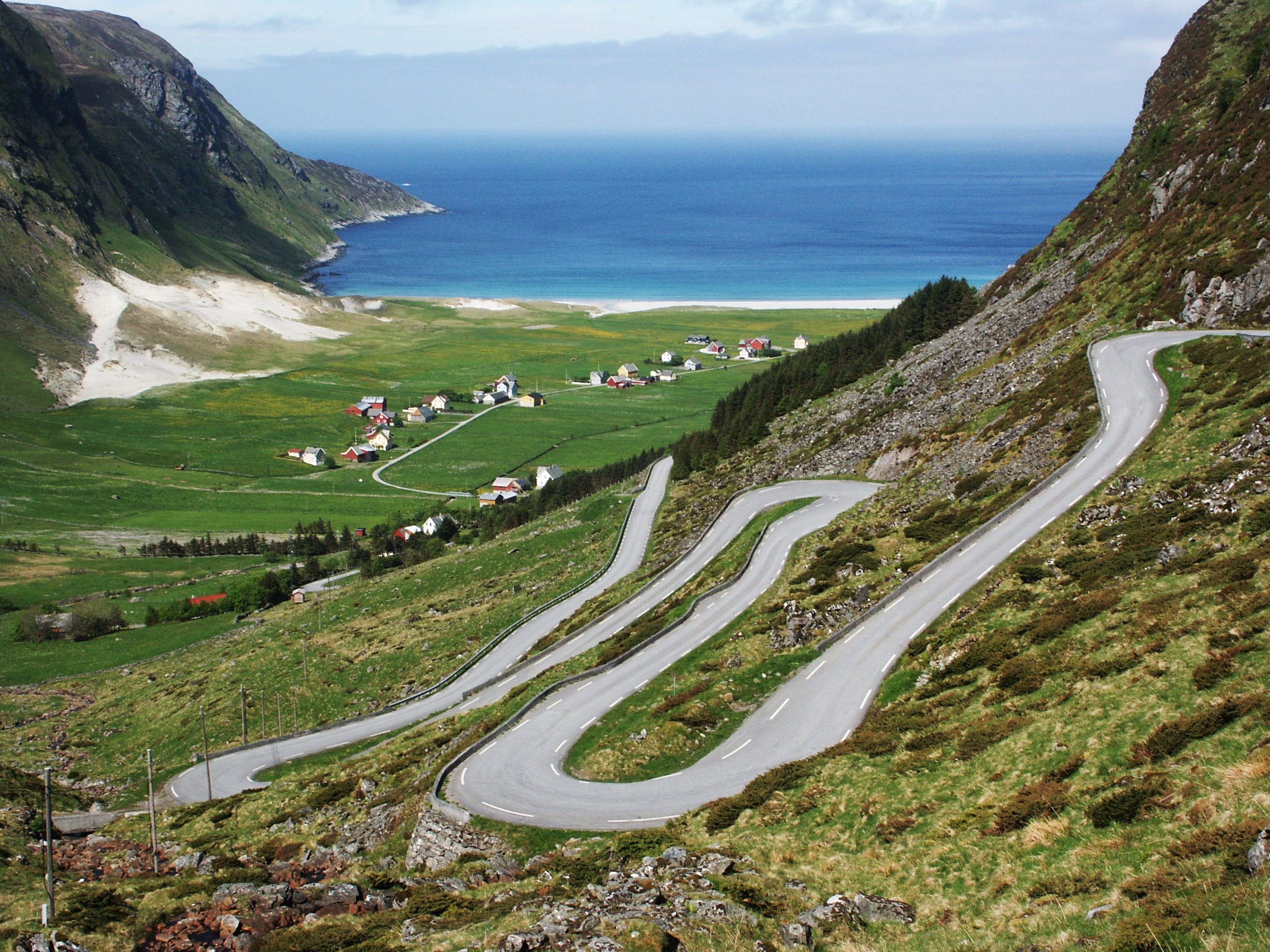
The village of Hoddevik on the Stad peninsula in Stad Municipality

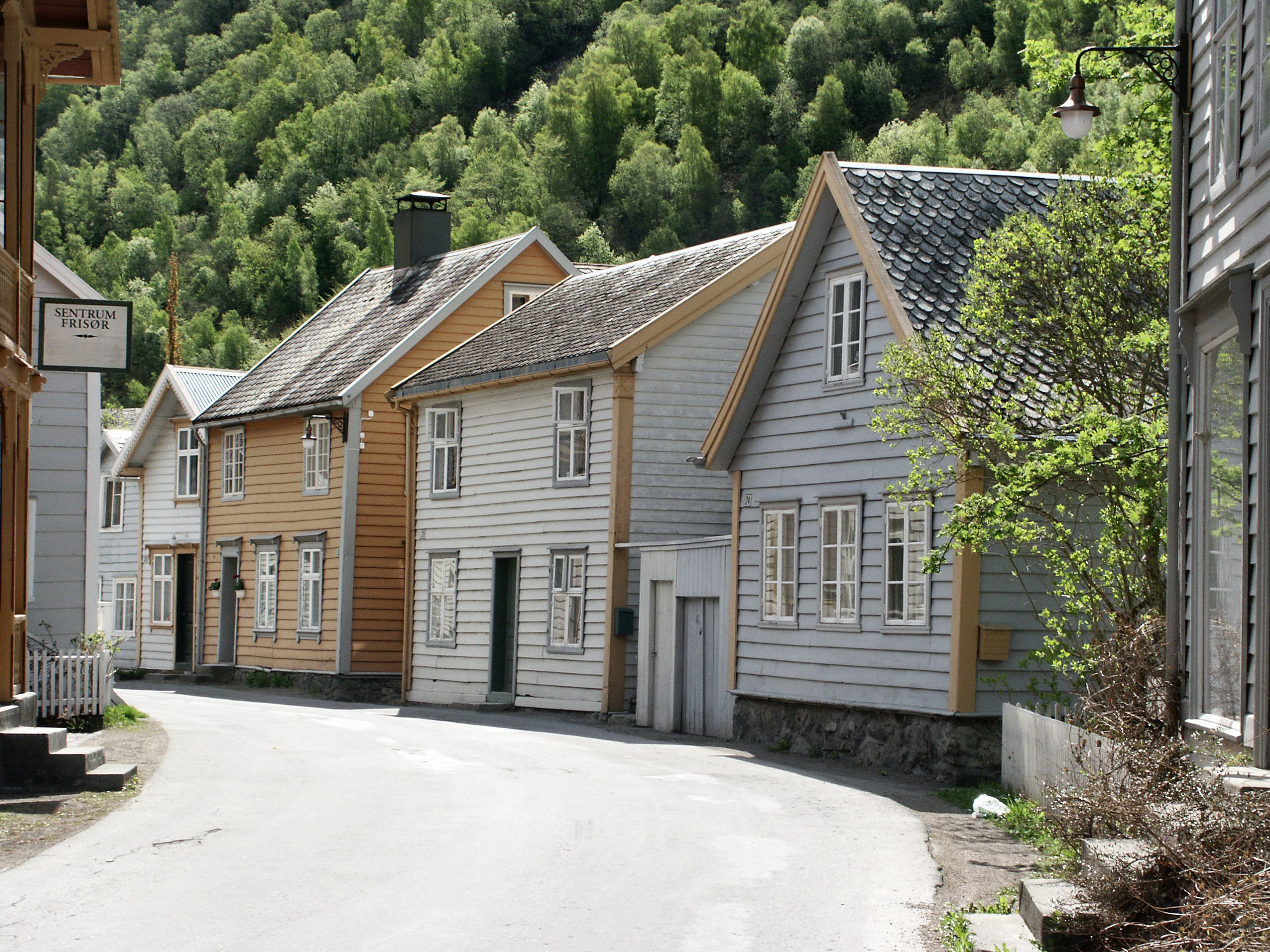
Some old houses in Lærdalsøyri, Lærdal Municipality

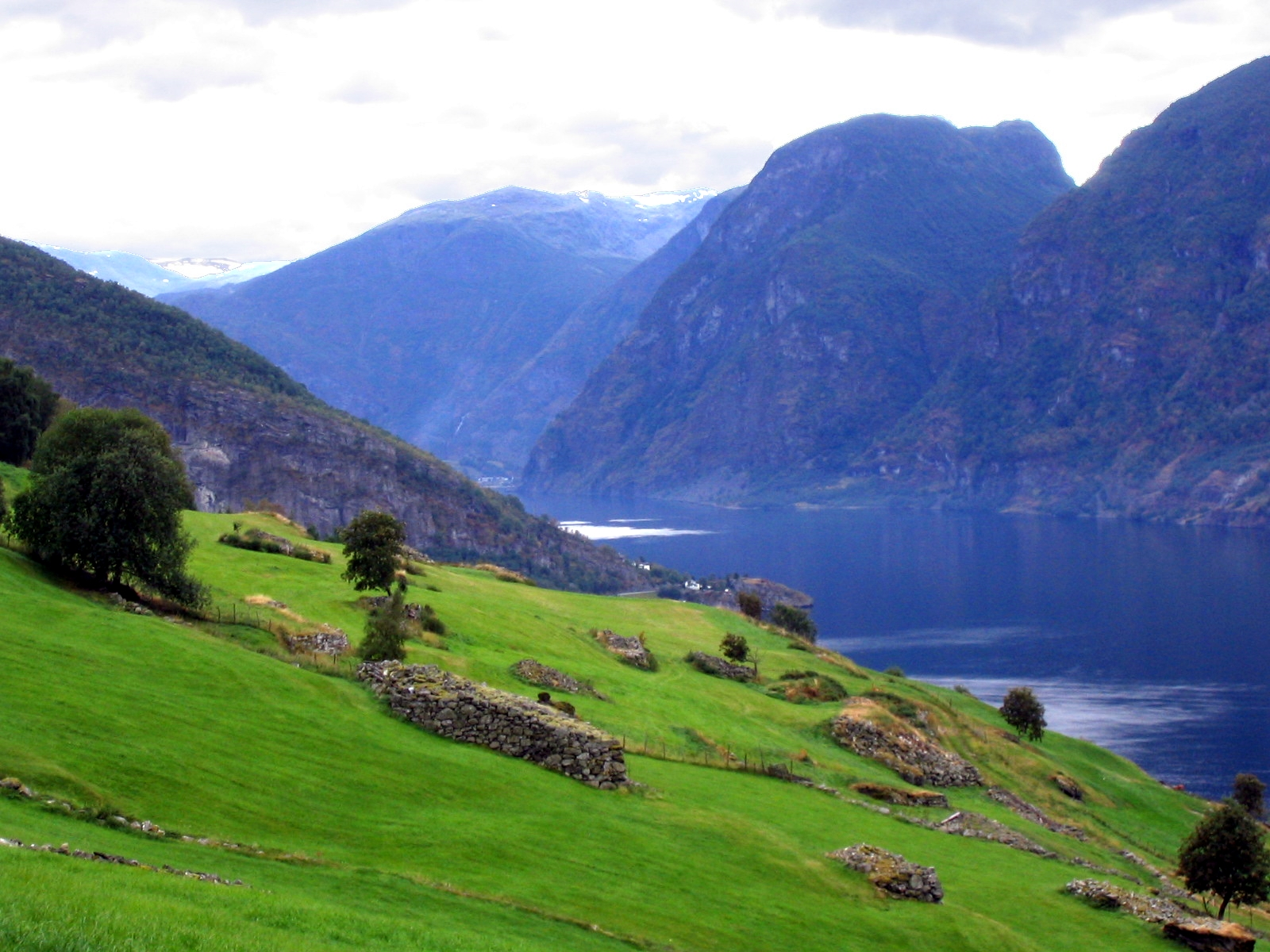
View from Aurland Municipality

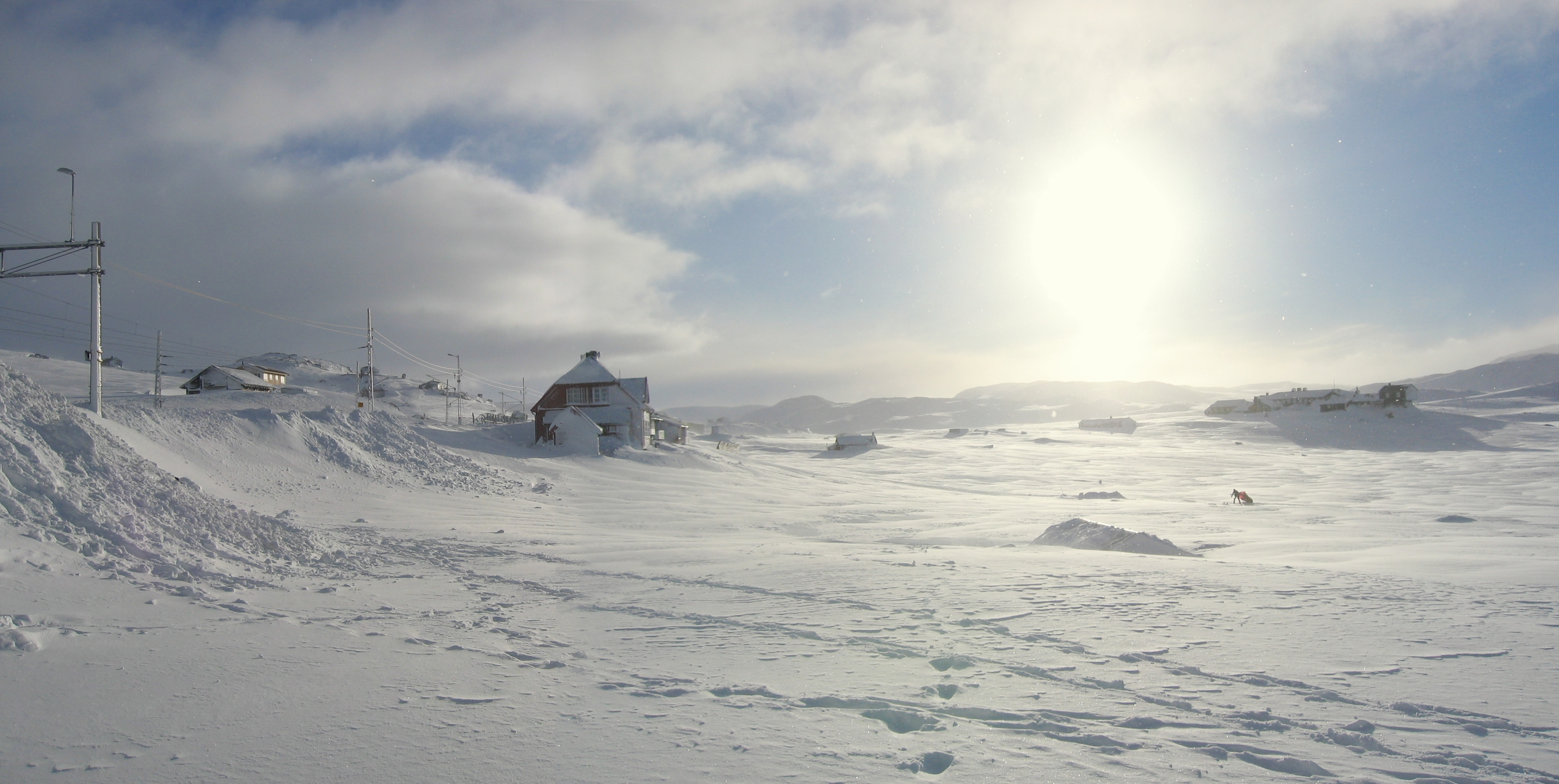
Finse is the highest point of the Norwegian Railway System, located at 1,222 m (4,009 ft) above sea level
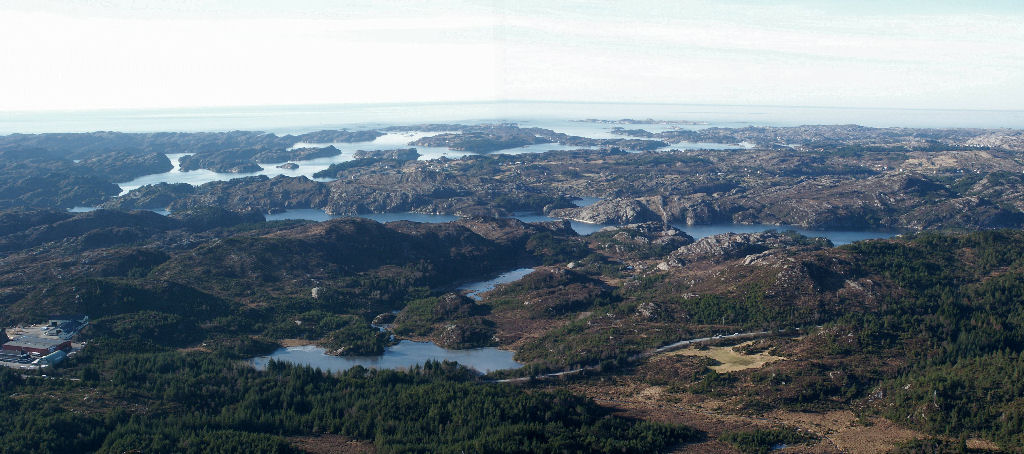
Panorama over the island of Sotra.

== Municipalities ==
Vestland County has a total of 43 municipalities:

Municipal Number	Name	Adm. Centre	Location in the county	Established	Old Municipal No. (before 2020)	Former County (before 2020)
4601	Bergen Municipality	Bergen		1 January 1972	1201 Bergen	Hordaland
4602	Kinn Municipality	Florø		1 January 2020	1401 Flora; 1439 Vågsøy (part)	Sogn og Fjordane
4611	Etne Municipality	Etnesjøen		1 January 1838	1211 Etne	Hordaland
4612	Sveio Municipality	Sveio		1 January 1865	1216 Sveio	Hordaland
4613	Bømlo Municipality	Svortland		1 January 1916	1219 Bømlo	Hordaland
4614	Stord Municipality	Leirvik		1 January 1838	1221 Stord	Hordaland
4615	Fitjar Municipality	Fitjar		1 January 1863	1222 Fitjar	Hordaland
4616	Tysnes Municipality	Uggdal		1 January 1838	1223 Tysnes	Hordaland
4617	Kvinnherad Municipality	Rosendal		1 January 1838	1224 Kvinnherad	Hordaland
4618	Ullensvang Municipality	Odda		1 January 1838	1227 Jondal; 1228 Odda; 1230 Ullensvang	Hordaland
4619	Eidfjord Municipality	Eidfjord		1 January 1977	1232 Eidfjord	Hordaland
4620	Ulvik Municipality	Ulvik		1 January 1838	1233 Ulvik	Hordaland
4621	Voss Municipality	Vossevangen		1 January 1838	1234 Granvin; 1235 Voss	Hordaland
4622	Kvam Municipality	Norheimsund		1 January 1838	1238 Kvam	Hordaland
4623	Samnanger Municipality	Tysse		1 January 1907	1242 Samnanger	Hordaland
4624	Bjørnafjorden Municipality	Osøyro		1 January 2020	1241 Fusa; 1243 Os	Hordaland
4625	Austevoll Municipality	Storebø		1 January 1886	1244 Austevoll	Hordaland
4626	Øygarden Municipality	Straume		1 January 1964	1245 Sund; 1246 Fjell; 1259 Øygarden	Hordaland
4627	Askøy Municipality	Kleppestø		1 January 1838	1247 Askøy	Hordaland
4628	Vaksdal Municipality	Dale		1 January 1964	1251 Vaksdal	Hordaland
4629	Modalen Municipality	Mo		1 January 1910	1252 Modalen	Hordaland
4630	Osterøy Municipality	Lonevåg		1 January 1964	1253 Osterøy	Hordaland
4631	Alver	Knarvik		1 January 2020	1256 Meland; 1260 Radøy; 1263 Lindås	Hordaland
4632	Austrheim Municipality	Årås		1 January 1910	1264 Austrheim	Hordaland
4633	Fedje Municipality	Fedje		1 January 1947	1265 Fedje	Hordaland
4634	Masfjorden Municipality	Masfjordnes		1 March 1879	1266 Masfjorden	Hordaland
4635	Gulen Municipality	Eivindvik		1 January 1838	1411 Gulen	Sogn og Fjordane
4636	Solund Municipality	Hardbakke		1 January 1858	1412 Solund	Sogn og Fjordane
4637	Hyllestad Municipality	Hyllestad		1 January 1862	1413 Hyllestad	Sogn og Fjordane
4638	Høyanger Municipality	Høyanger		1 January 1964	1416 Høyanger	Sogn og Fjordane
4639	Vik Municipality	Vikøyri		1 January 1838	1417 Vik	Sogn og Fjordane
4640	Sogndal Municipality	Hermansverk		1 January 1838	1418 Balestrand; 1419 Leikanger; 1420 Sogndal	Sogn og Fjordane
4641	Aurland Municipality	Aurlandsvangen		1 January 1838	1421 Aurland	Sogn og Fjordane
4642	Lærdal Municipality	Lærdalsøyri		1 January 1838	1422 Lærdal	Sogn og Fjordane
4643	Årdal Municipality	Årdalstangen		1 January 1863	1424 Årdal	Sogn og Fjordane
4644	Luster Municipality	Gaupne		1 January 1838	1426 Luster	Sogn og Fjordane
4645	Askvoll Municipality	Askvoll		1 January 1838	1428 Askvoll	Sogn og Fjordane
4646	Fjaler Municipality	Dale		1 January 1838	1429 Fjaler	Sogn og Fjordane
4647	Sunnfjord Municipality	Førde		1 January 2020	1430 Gaular; 1431 Jølster; 1432 Førde; 1433 Naustdal	Sogn og Fjordane
4648	Bremanger Municipality	Svelgen		1 January 1866	1438 Bremanger	Sogn og Fjordane
4649	Stad Municipality	Nordfjordeid		1 January 2020	1439 Vågsøy (part); 1441 Selje; 1443 Eid	Sogn og Fjordane
4650	Gloppen Municipality	Sandane		1 January 1838	1445 Gloppen	Sogn og Fjordane
4651	Stryn Municipality	Stryn		1 January 1843	1449 Stryn	Sogn og Fjordane

== See also ==
- List of villages in Vestland
- List of churches in Bjørgvin
- Søråsen
