= Nordhordland District Court =

Former district court in Norway

- Nordhordland tingrett
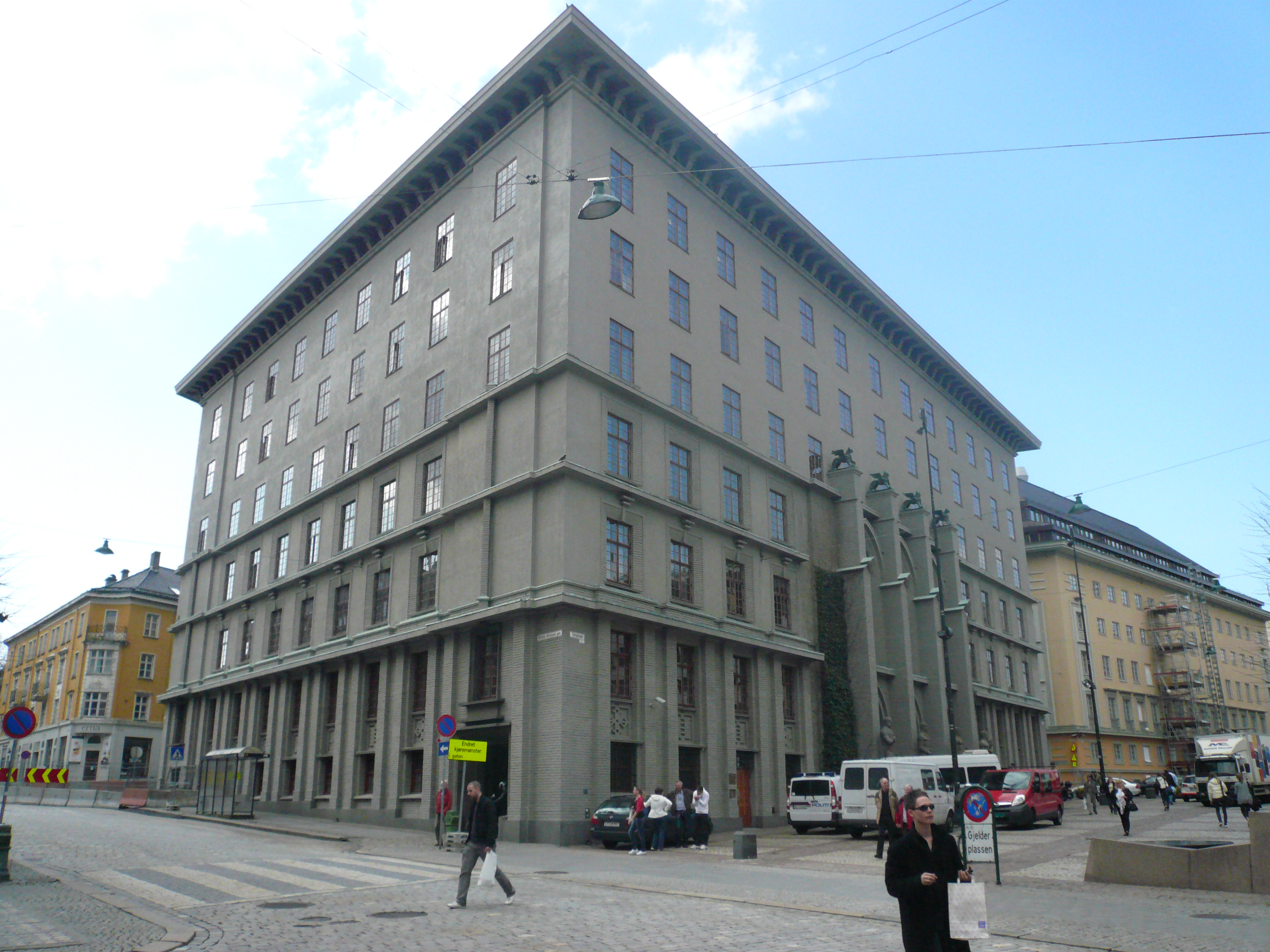
- Bergen Courthouse
- 60.393547°N 05.3216171°E
- Established: 1591
- Dissolved: 31 Dec 2016
- Jurisdiction: Nordhordland
- Location: Bergen, Norway
- Coordinates: 60.393547°N 05.3216171°E
- Appeals to: Gulating Court of Appeal

Nordhordland District Court (Norwegian: Nordhordland tingrett) was a district court in Norway serving the Nordhordland and Midhordland (except for Bergen Municipality) in Hordaland county, as well as Gulen Municipality in Sogn og Fjordane county. The court served the municipalities of Askøy, Austevoll, Austrheim, Fedje, Fjell, Fusa, Gulen, Lindås, Masfjorden, Meland, Modalen, Os, Osterøy, Radøy, Samnanger, Sund, Vaksdal, Voss, and Øygarden. The court was subordinate to the Gulating Court of Appeal. The court was led by the chief judge (Sorenskriver). The Nordhordland District Court was co-located with the Bergen District Court at the Bergen Tinghus at Tårnplads 2 in Bergen.

The court was a court of first instance. Its judicial duties were mainly to settle criminal cases and to resolve civil litigation as well as bankruptcy. The administration and registration tasks of the court included death registration, issuing certain certificates, performing duties of a notary public, and officiating civil wedding ceremonies. Cases from this court were heard by a combination of professional judges and lay judges.

== Courthouse ==
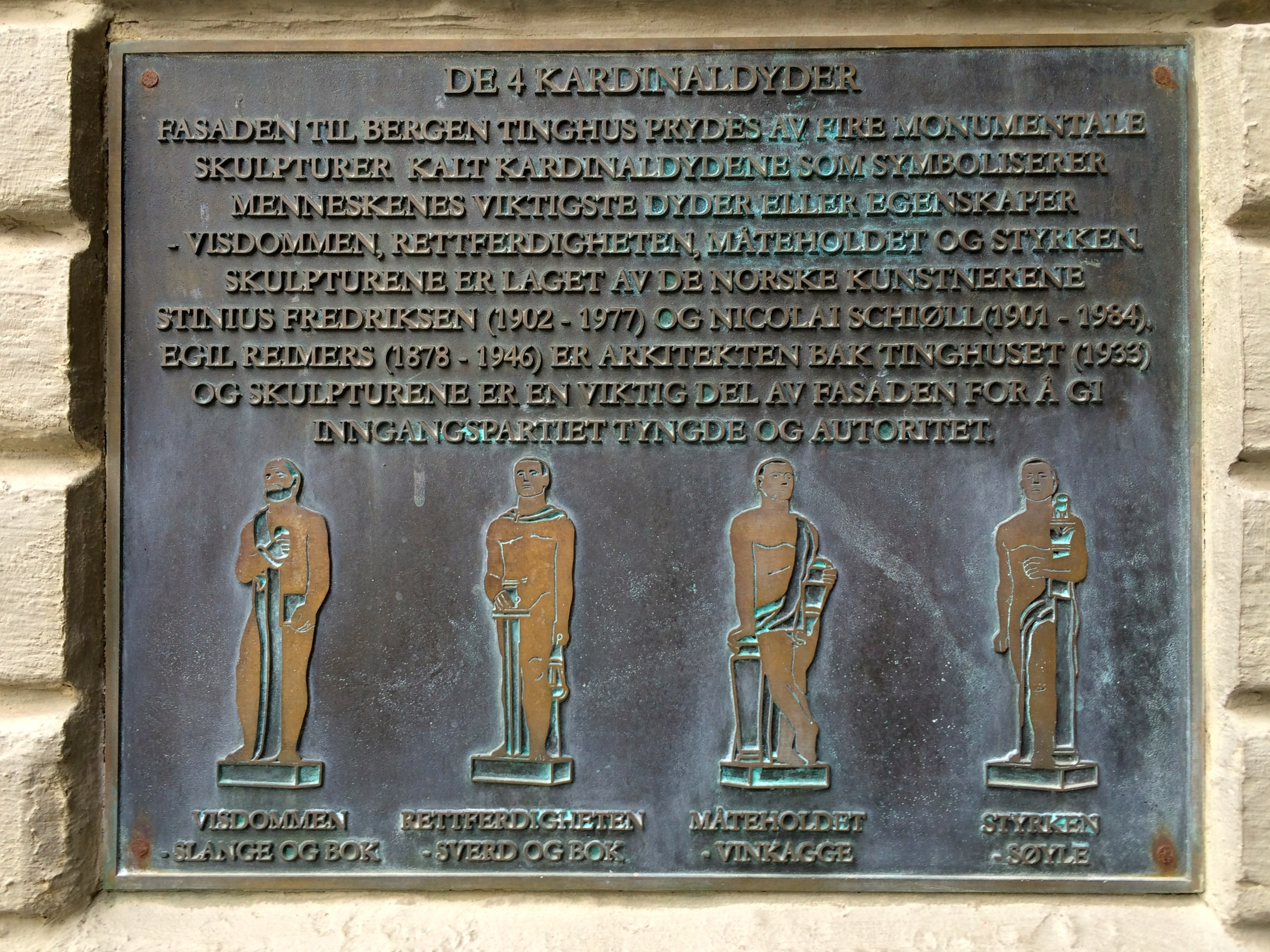
Plaque at the main entrance of Bergen Tinghus

Bergen Tinghus was designed by architect Egill Reimers in a neoclassical style during 1933 and it is considered one of his main works. The brick building has 25 courtrooms covering six floors plus basement and loft. At the main entrance on Tårnplass, there are four granite statues representing the cardinal virtues: wisdom, justice, moderation and strength. The sculptures were designed by artists Nic Schiøll and Stinius Fredriksen.

== History ==
The court was first established in 1591 when the district court system was created in Norway. On 23 December 1773, the parish of Evindvik was transferred from this court to the neighboring Ytre Sogn District Court. On 1 January 1848, the Nordhordland District Court was divided, with the southern parts becoming the new Midhordland District Court (the northern part kept the old Nordhordland name). On 1 January 2006, the old Midhordland District Court was merged (back) into the Nordhordland District Court. Also in 2006, the old Voss District Court and Ytre Sogn District Court were both dissolved and Voss Municipality and Gulen Municipality were moved to the jurisdiction of the Nordhordland District Court. On 1 January 2017, the Nordhordland District Court dissolved and its jurisdictional areas were merged into the Bergen District Court. On 26 April 2021, Gulen Municipality was moved from this court's jurisdiction to the neighboring Sogn og Fjordane District Court.
