= Aurlandsdalen =

Valley in Vestland, Norway

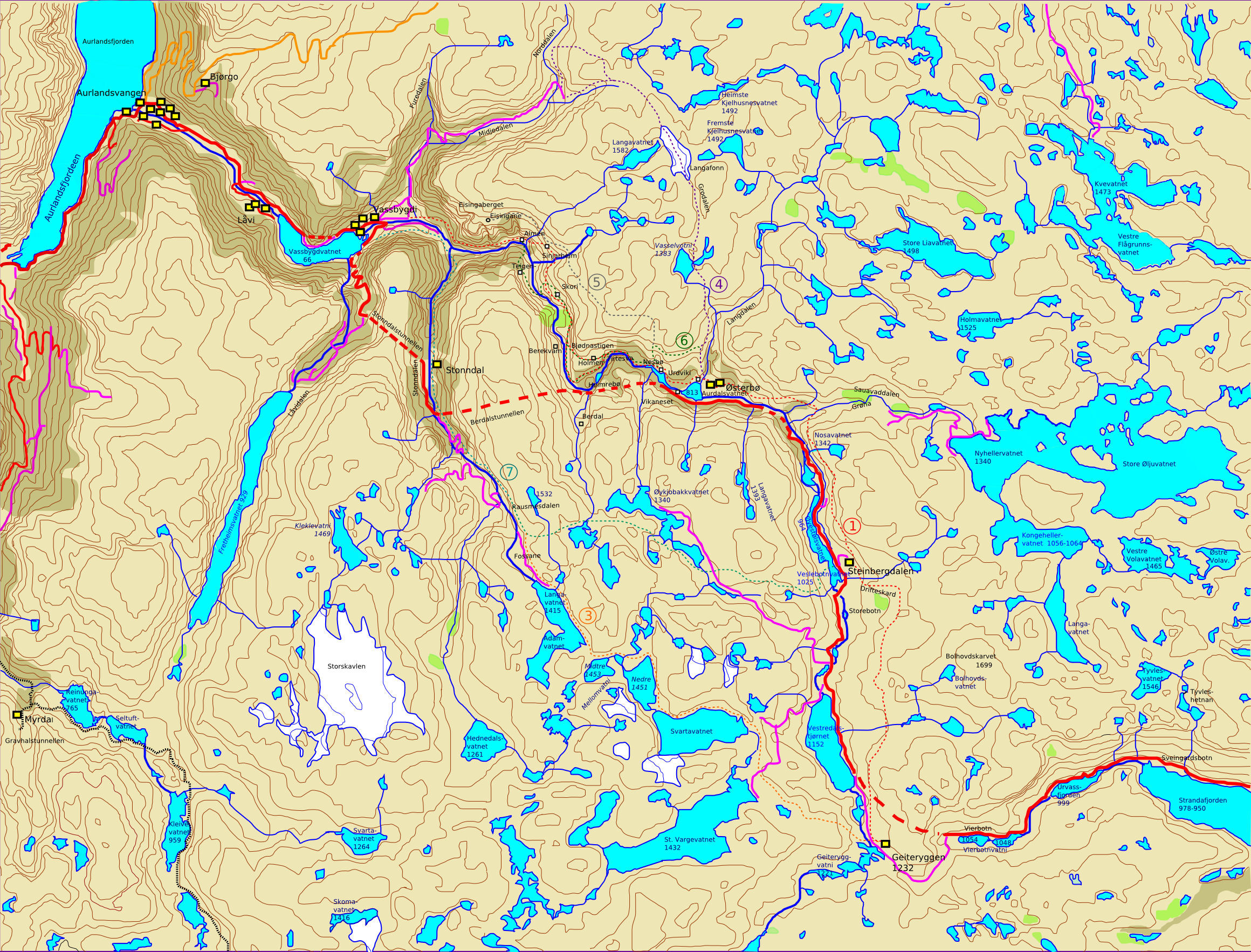
- Aurlandsdalen, roads and old paths. See also detailed map
- Length: 40 kilometres (25 mi)

Geology
- Type: River valley

Geography
- Location: Vestland, Norway
- Population centers: Aurlandsvangen
- Coordinates: 60°51′36″N 07°15′55″E
- River: Aurlandselvi
- Interactive map of Aurlandsdalen

Aurlandsdalen is a glacially-formed Norwegian valley that is about 40 kilometres (25 mi) in length (Geiteryggen-Vassbygdi). The valley is situated in Aurland Municipality in Vestland county, to the south of the Sognefjorden. One of the best-known tourist tracks in Norway follows the valley from Geiteryggen just across the border of Hol Municipality and north east to Aurlandsvangen at the Aurlandsfjorden in Sogn. The valley narrows and becomes a tight, dramatic Western Norway valley. It combines glacially carved valleys with diverse plant species, and a number of cultural monuments in the form of old farms and mountain dairy farms (regionally called "støl"s) to form a recognized tourist attraction. The richness in plant species is due to both the soil, rich in minerals formed from phyllite in the rocks and cultural influence through the centuries.

The upper part of the river running through the valley is called Stemberdøla; in the lower part it is called Aurlandselvi. The route from Aurland to Hol has been the shortest connection between western and eastern Norway since prehistoric times. Thus the valley has been an important connection line for commercial journeys and cattle drives through and along the valley and over the surrounding mountain highlands.

== Access to the valley ==
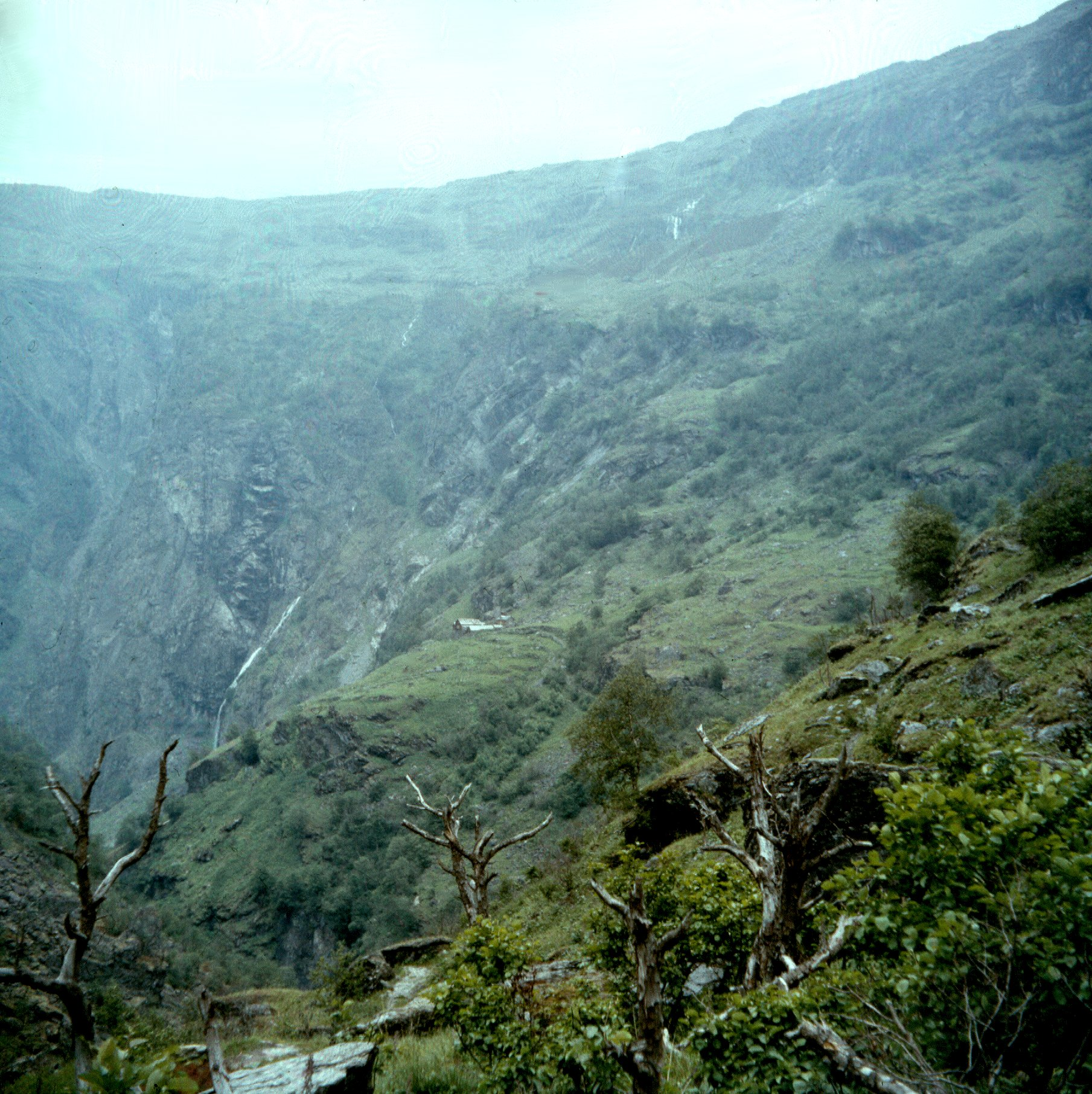
1960.View towards Sinjarheim from Haugane in the area above Bridlebrui. At the edge of the mountain plateau, just above the farm, one can with difficulty see the mountain dairy farm or seter, Orrasete.

Aurlandsdalen can be reached either from the village of Aurlandsvangen or from Vierbotn at Geiteryggen (which transliterates, perhaps descriptively, as goat's back). Access to Aurlandsvangen is possible via hurtigbåt (rapid boat) from Bergen or via the European route E16 highway. Geiteryggen can be reached via highway 50 from Hol Municipality in Hallingdal.

The ancient passage through the mountains can be traveled on foot via Norwegian Mountain Touring Association (DNT) marked tracks: Finse - Geiteryggen, Raggsteindalen (at Strandafjorden) - Geiteryggen or the track Iungsdalen - Stemberdalen. Another DNT track leads from Hallingskeid through Såtedalen, along north west side of Omnsvatnet and further over Bakkahelleren along Geiteryggvatnet to Geiteryggen.

The original proposal for routing the Bergen Line had it passing through Geiteryggen; if these plans had been carried out the railway tracks would have followed this trace to Hallingskeid.

== Topography ==
Down the long valley, descending from the open mountain highland at Geiteryggen (1,232 m in elevation) the landscape becomes gradually more broken. At Stemberdalen, (also called Steinbergdalen, Stemmerdalen, Stodmerrdalen) at about 1100 m in elevation, the valley is wide and open with gradual mountains slopes and open areas covered with farm places. Earlier, before dams pooled the river into reservoirs, the river flowed gradually in broad turns which could be navigated by small boats. From Stemberdalen the valley again narrows with the hillsides steepening and the river channel increasing in gradient.

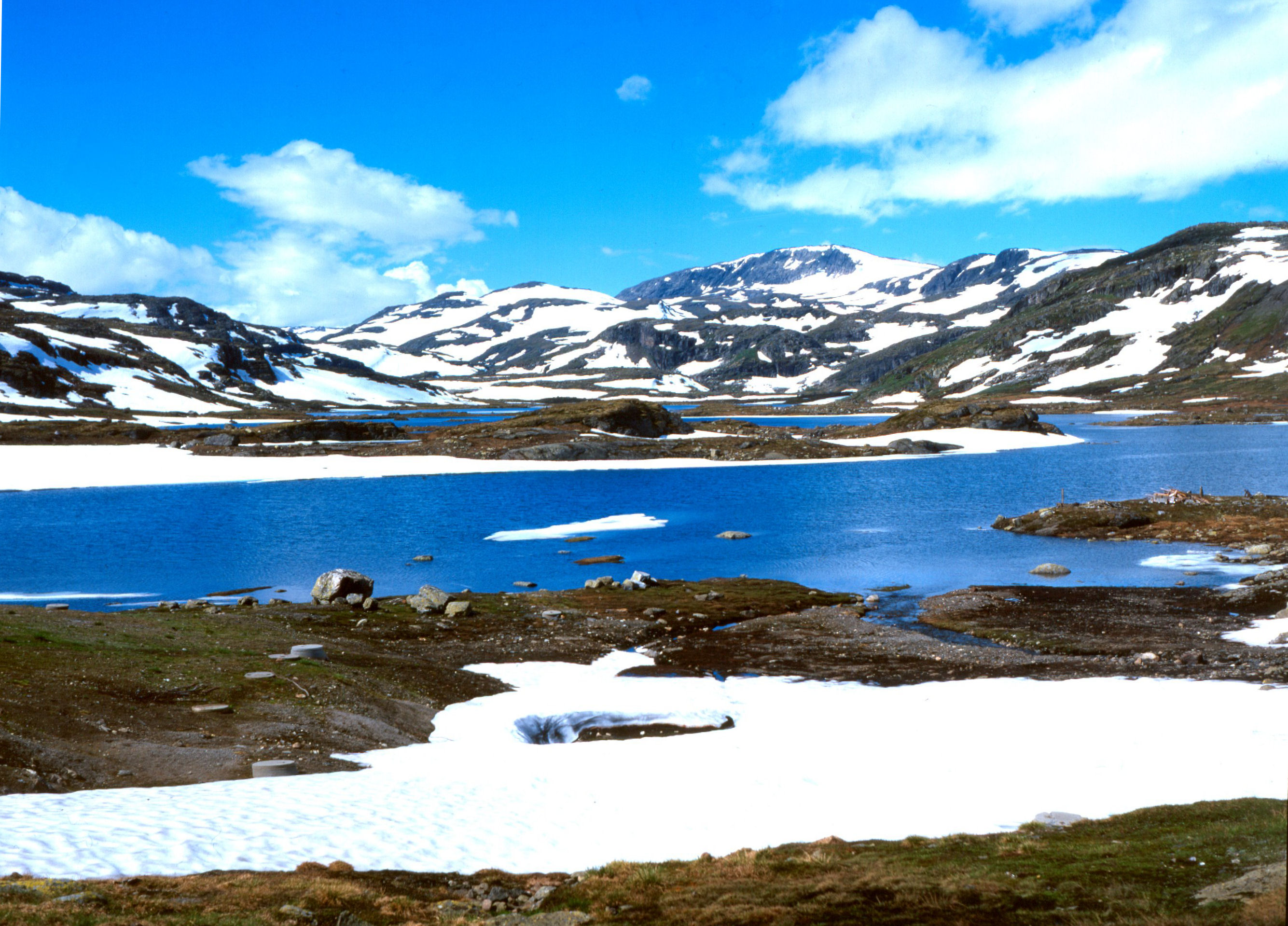
2001. Mountain highland at Geiteryggen. View over Geiteryggvatnet (vatn = lake) westwards towards Bakkahelleren and Såtedalen (dal = valley).

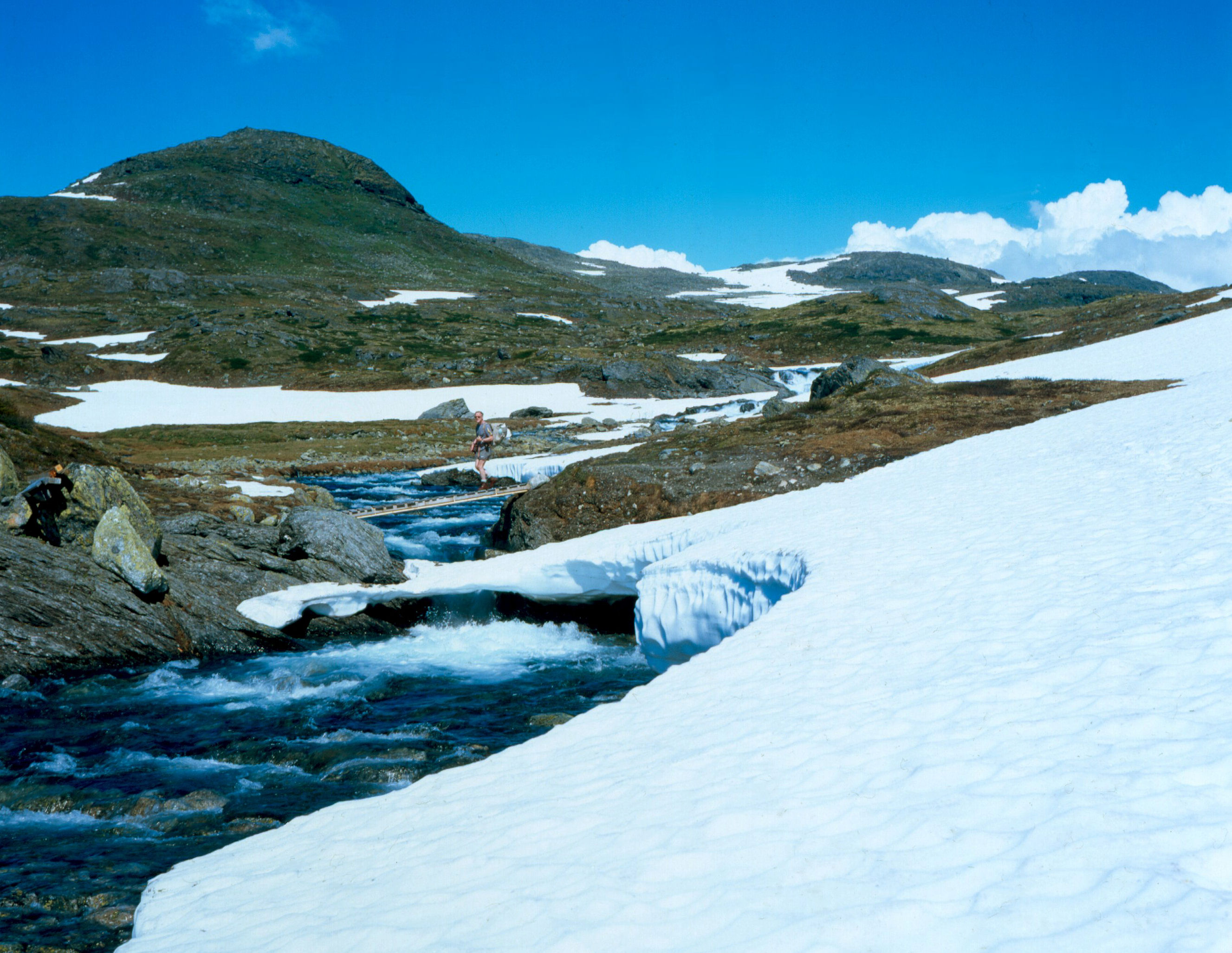
2001. Sommerklopp (sommer = summer, klopp = small bridge) across Rossdøla between Geiteryggen and Stemberdalen. Bolhovd can be seen in the background.

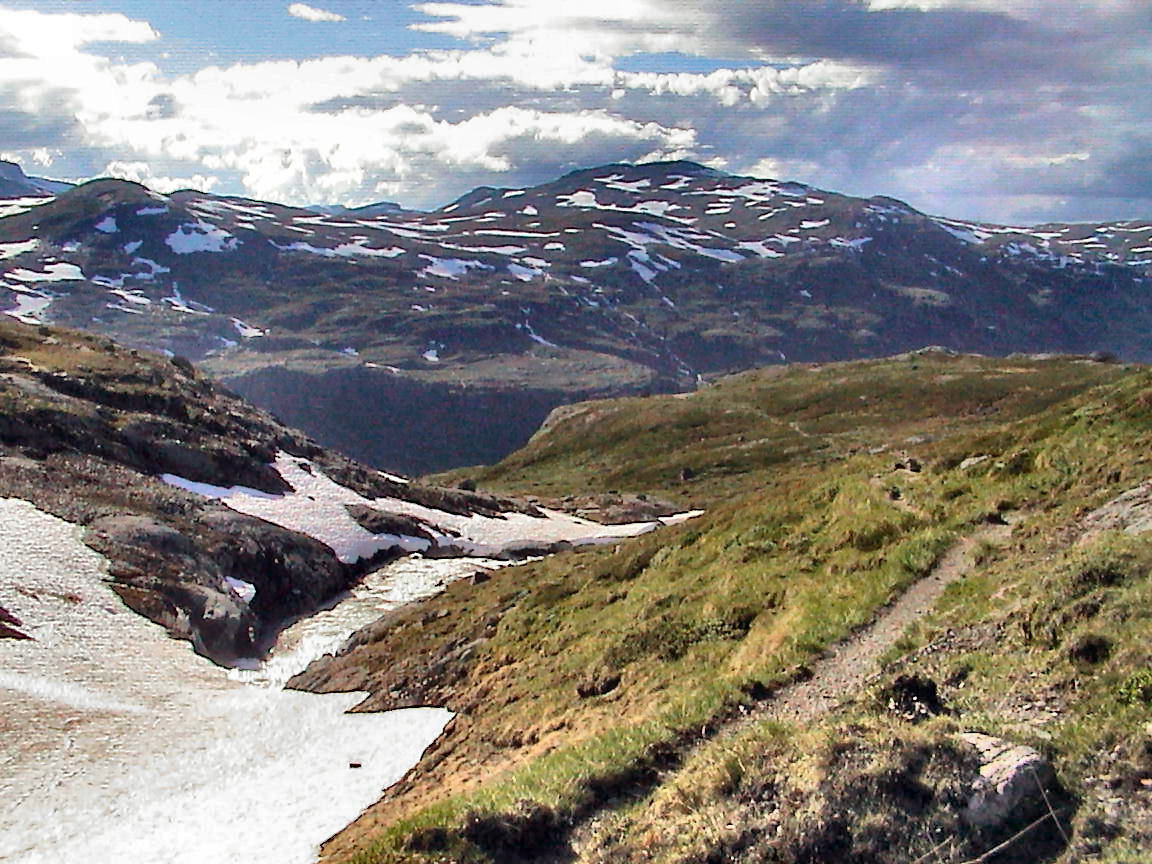
2001. Drifteskard (drift = (cattle) drive) towards Storebotn lake high in Stemberdalen.

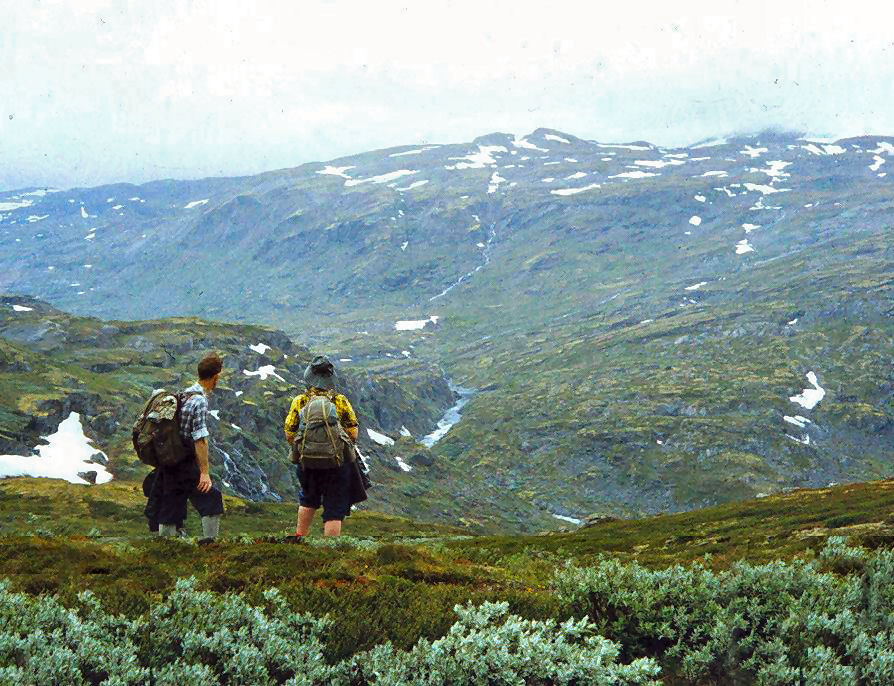
1960. View towards Storebotn. Today the highway follows the river along the western bank (i.e., to the right).

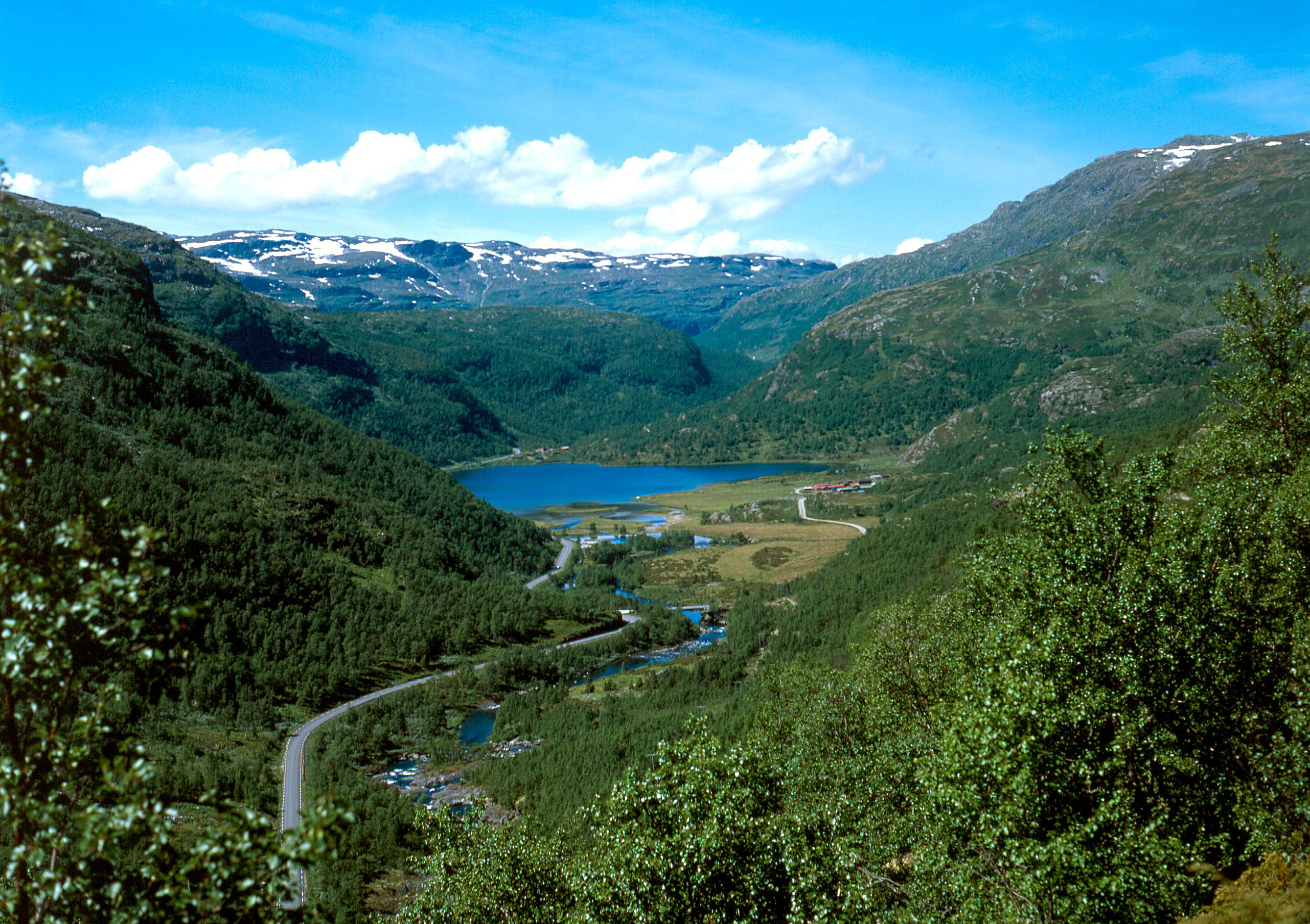
2001. Aurdal seen from Grønestølskleivane (grønn = green, støl = dairy farm, kleiv = steep hill). In Aurdal the valley widens out for a short stretch.

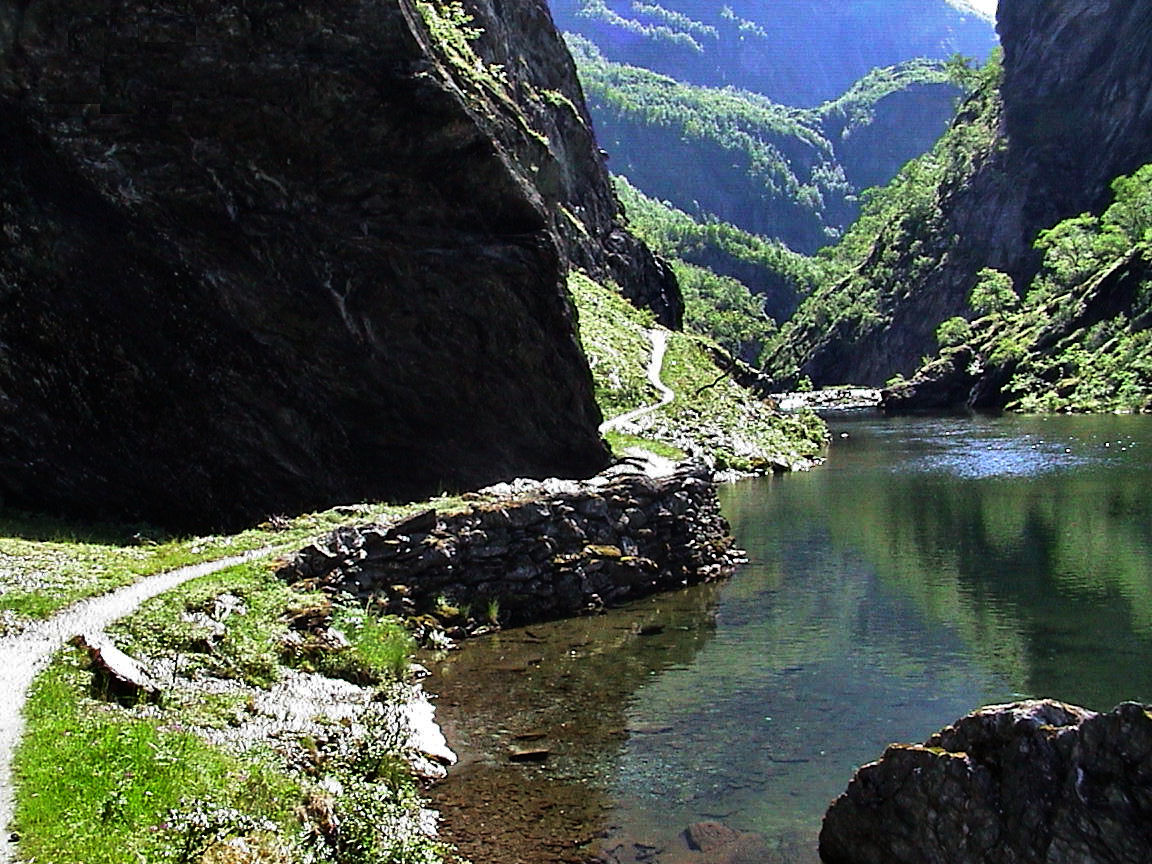
2001. In earlier times the flow of water in the river was much higher.

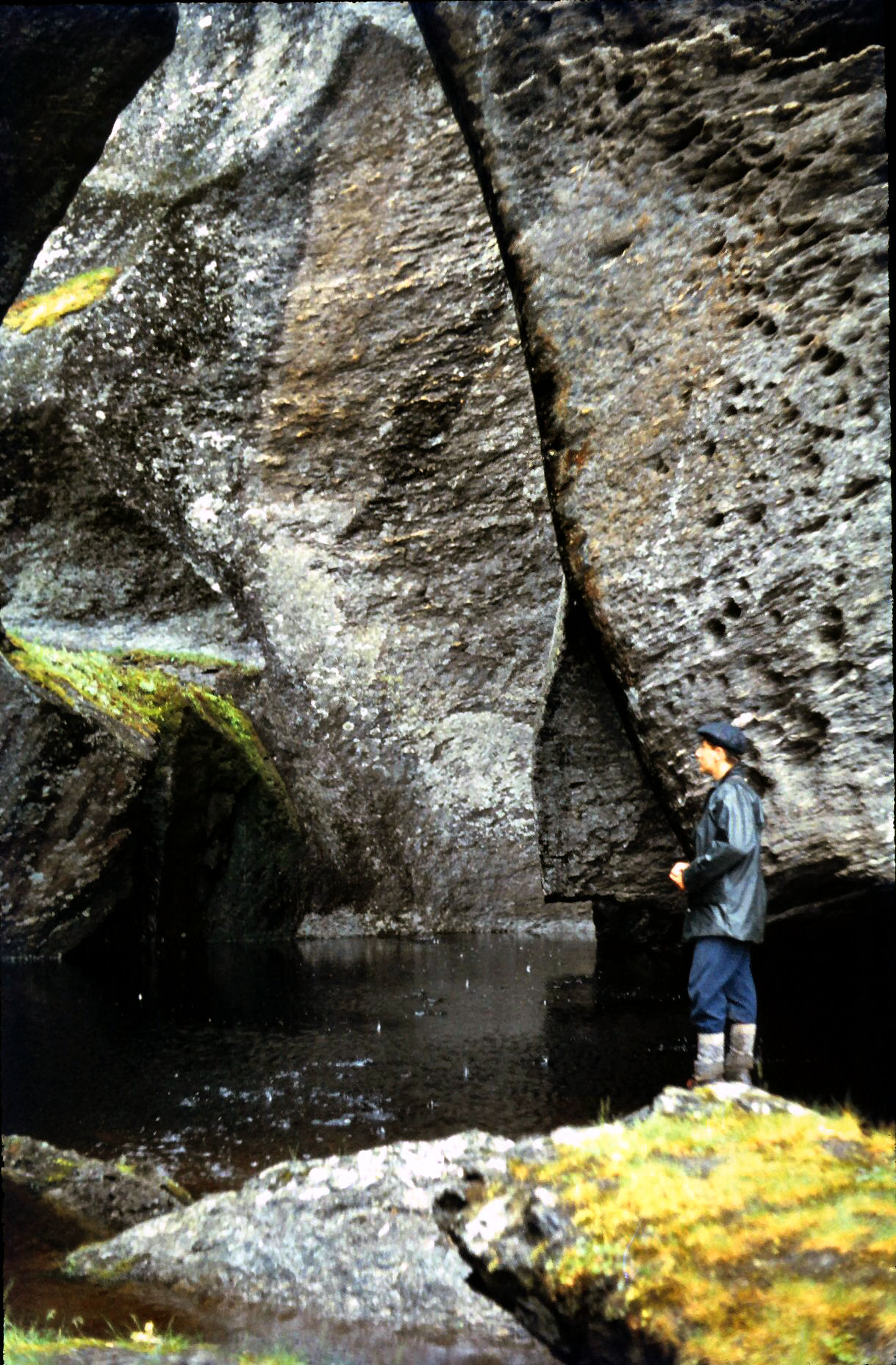
1961. Vetlehelvete (vetle = little, helvete = hell). Open pothole beneath Bjødnastigen Bjødn (bjørn = bear, stigen = path or ladder).

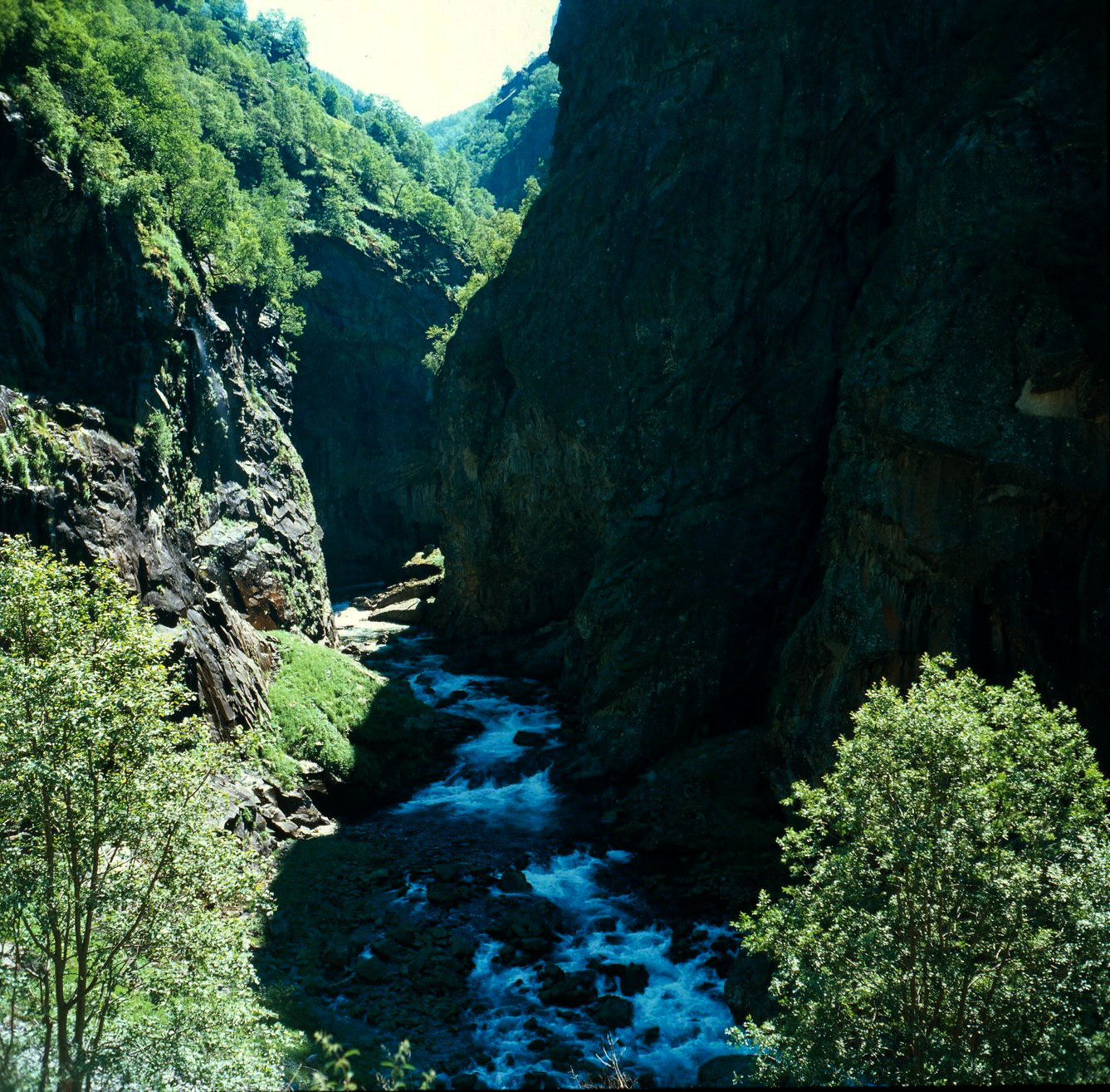
The bottom of the valley under Sinjarheim is impassable. For passage through this stretch, the river is crossed at Almen, descending to Teigen and then crossing the river again via Bridlebrui (bru = bridge).

At Østerbø (Øvstebø, Aurdal), at about 900 metres (3,000 ft), for a limited stretch the timberline reaches up to the middle of the hillsides. The river widens to a calm lake, Aurdalsvatnet, which is now regulated for hydroelectric power generation. From Østerbø the valley becomes steeper and more narrow as it passes downwards to Vassbygdi (vass = water, bygd = settlement, parish). The mountain flanks rise steeply from the bottom of the valley. The river has cut deep gorges, where it is diverted to the south, then turning north again at Heimrebø, until it resumes it original course to the northwest. From here the river follows a gorge so deep that the valley bottom is impassable. At the depopulated Almen region, the valley is partly passable along the river. The valley then gradually widens until it meets Midjedalen in vassbygdi. From here to Aurlandsvangen, the bottom of the valley is relatively flat and even and the mountain flanks ascend steeply. Access to Aurlandsvangen is cut off by Vassbygdvatnet; the road bypasses the Vassbygvatnet through a tunnel.

== History ==
=== Power development and environmental impacts ===
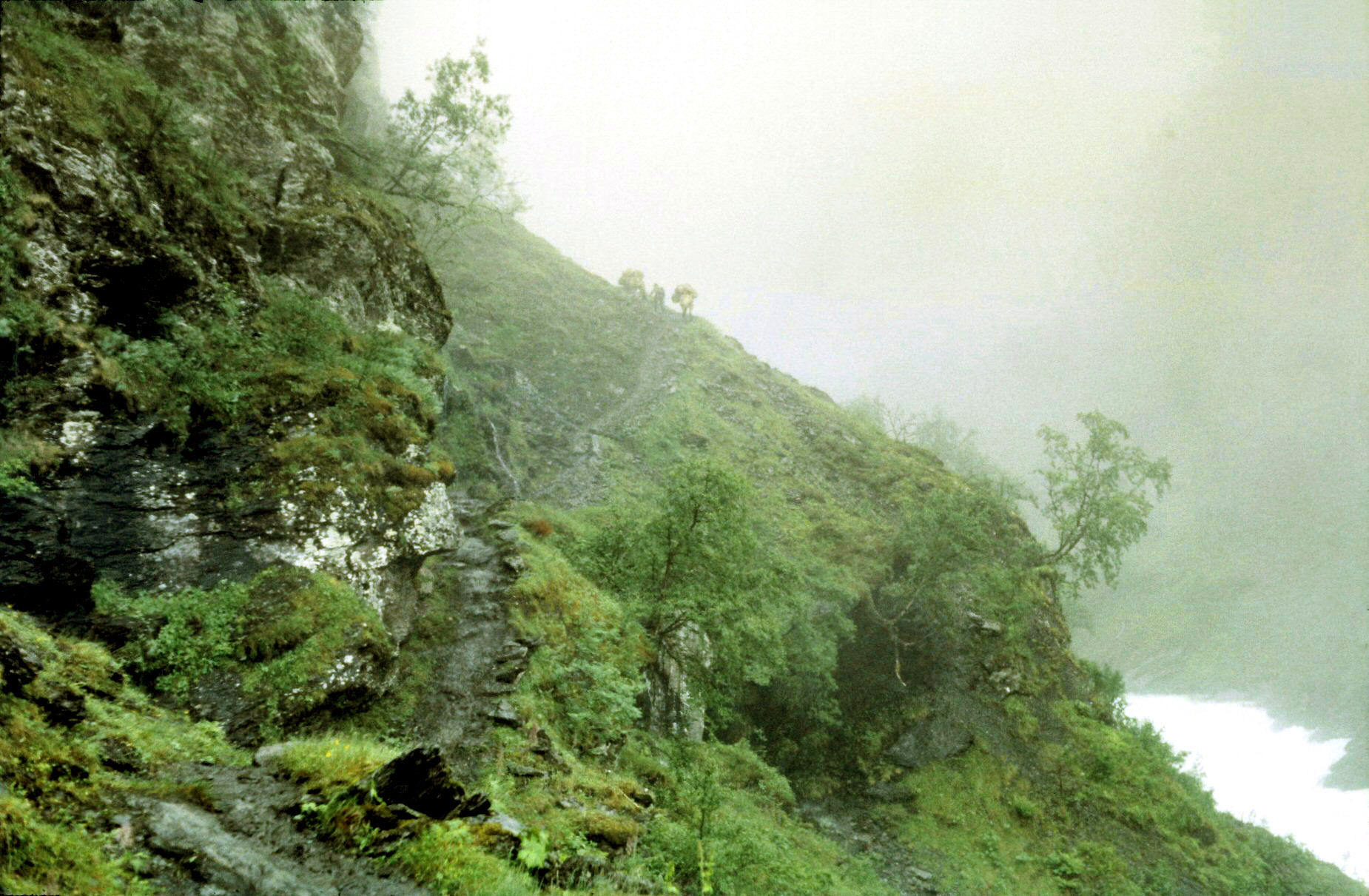
1961. Knut Sønnerheim, just before Heimrebø, with his two pack horses with supplies to the Østerbø turisthytte (hytte = cabin). Each horse could carry 100 kg. The trip to Østerbø-Vassbygdi had to be repeated two or three times a week. All the wood required for cooking and heating had to be transported on the horseback to Steinbergdalen turisthytte as well.

The Aurland river system was estimated to annually produce around 2 billion kWh of hydroelectric power. It was developed in the 1970s after a much disputed decision by the Stortinget (the Norwegian Parliament) in 1969. Oslo Lysverker (the Oslo utility) was behind this development. It was promoted as a demonstration of public power development.

The environmental impacts of the hydroelectric development are notable; the great waterfalls in the Aurlandsdalen have been silenced. The standing waves, spray and mist from the rapids and waterfalls has been substantially reduced. Due to diversion through tunnels, the water level in the river gorges is drastically reduced; dams restrain the thundering inferno that filled the gorges before the development. There are other impacts as well. The Aurlandselvi river is no longer one of the finest salmon rivers in Norway. Farmers no longer drive cattle, pigs and goats to spend the summer at Østerbø and Stemberdalen. The pack horses, formerly a common sight in the valley, as Jon Fimreite and Knut Sønnerheim among others transported provisions and supplies to Steinbergdalshytta and Østerbø, have become part of history.

Aurlandsdalen has become like most of the other valleys, characterized by traffic, tourists and gradual urbanisation. Only the remote Nesbø-Vassbygdi region remains mostly undisturbed, if one ignores the strong reduction in the water flow in the Aurlandselvi and the visible stretch of highway between Berdalstunnellen (Berdal tunnel) and Nesbøtunnellen (Nesbø tunnel) visible in the hillside from the path at Heimrebø.

== Aurlandsdalen then and now ==
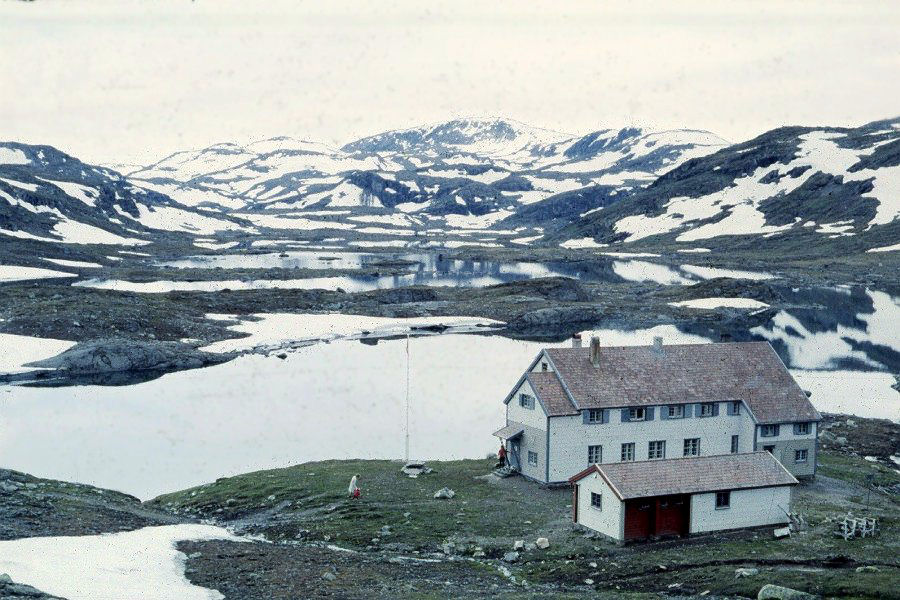
1961. Geiteryggen. View north east towards Geiteryggvatnet and Bakkahelleren.

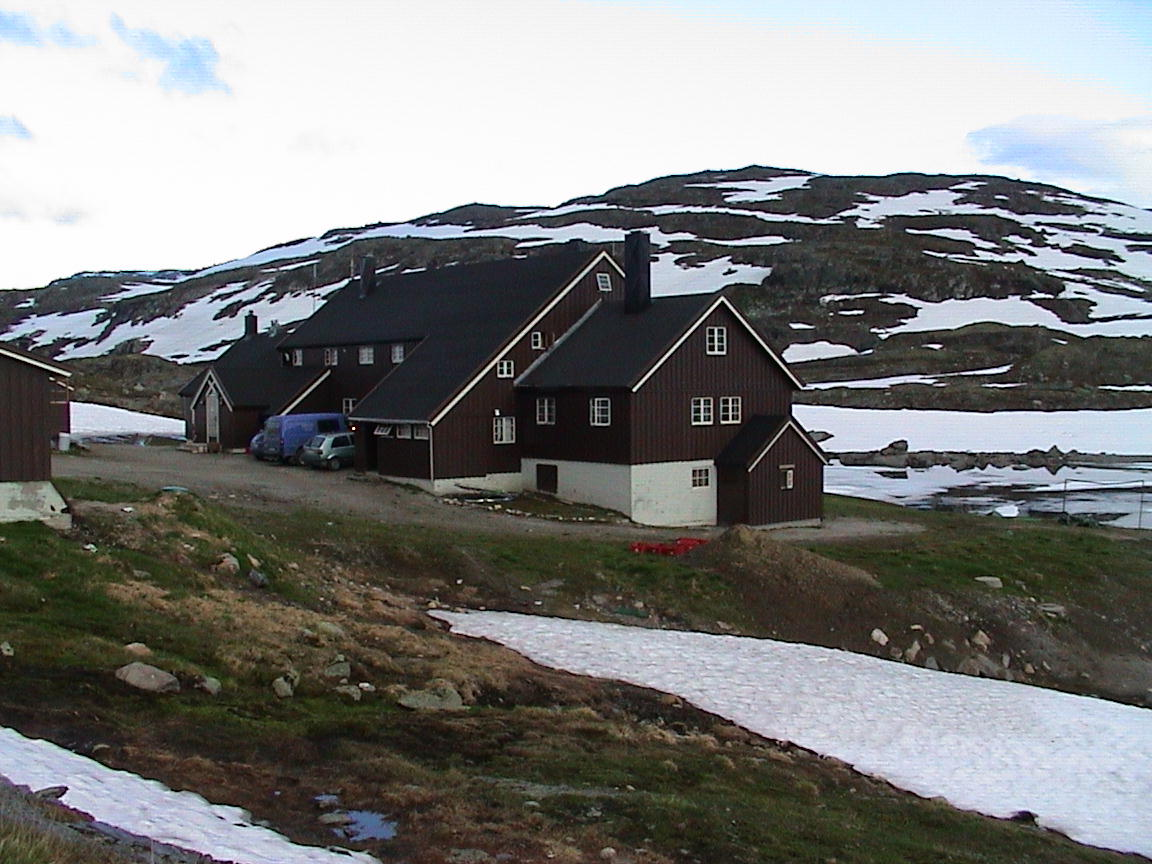
2001. Geiteryggen 40 years later as it appears today.

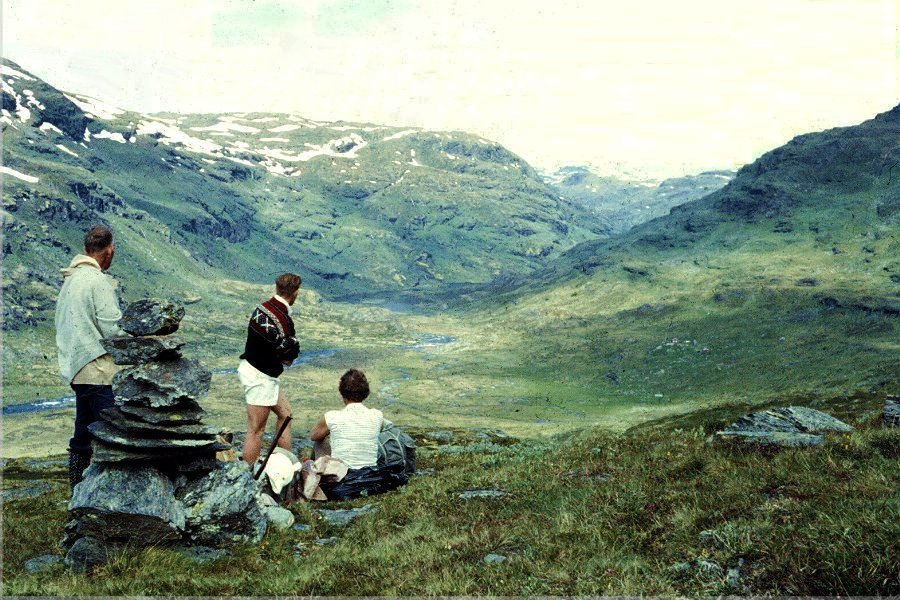
1961. View towards Stemberdalen.

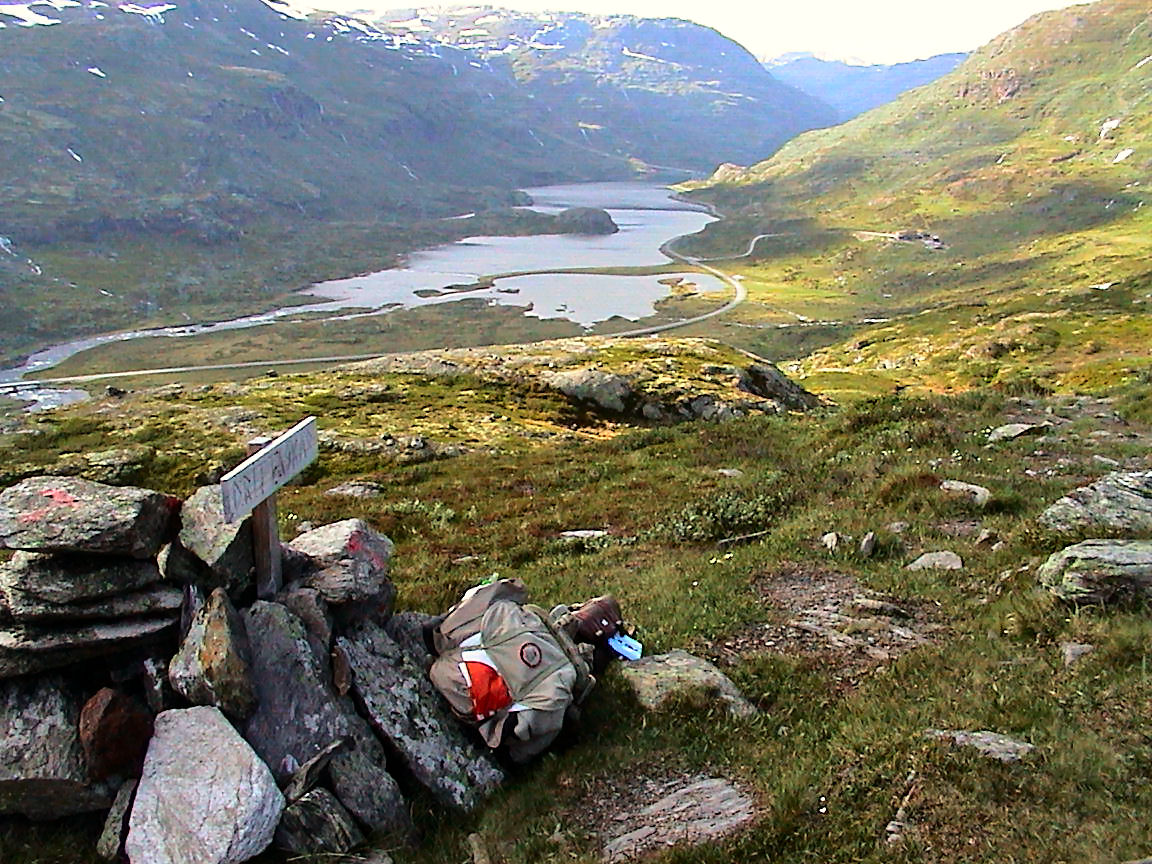
2001. View towards Stemberdalen.

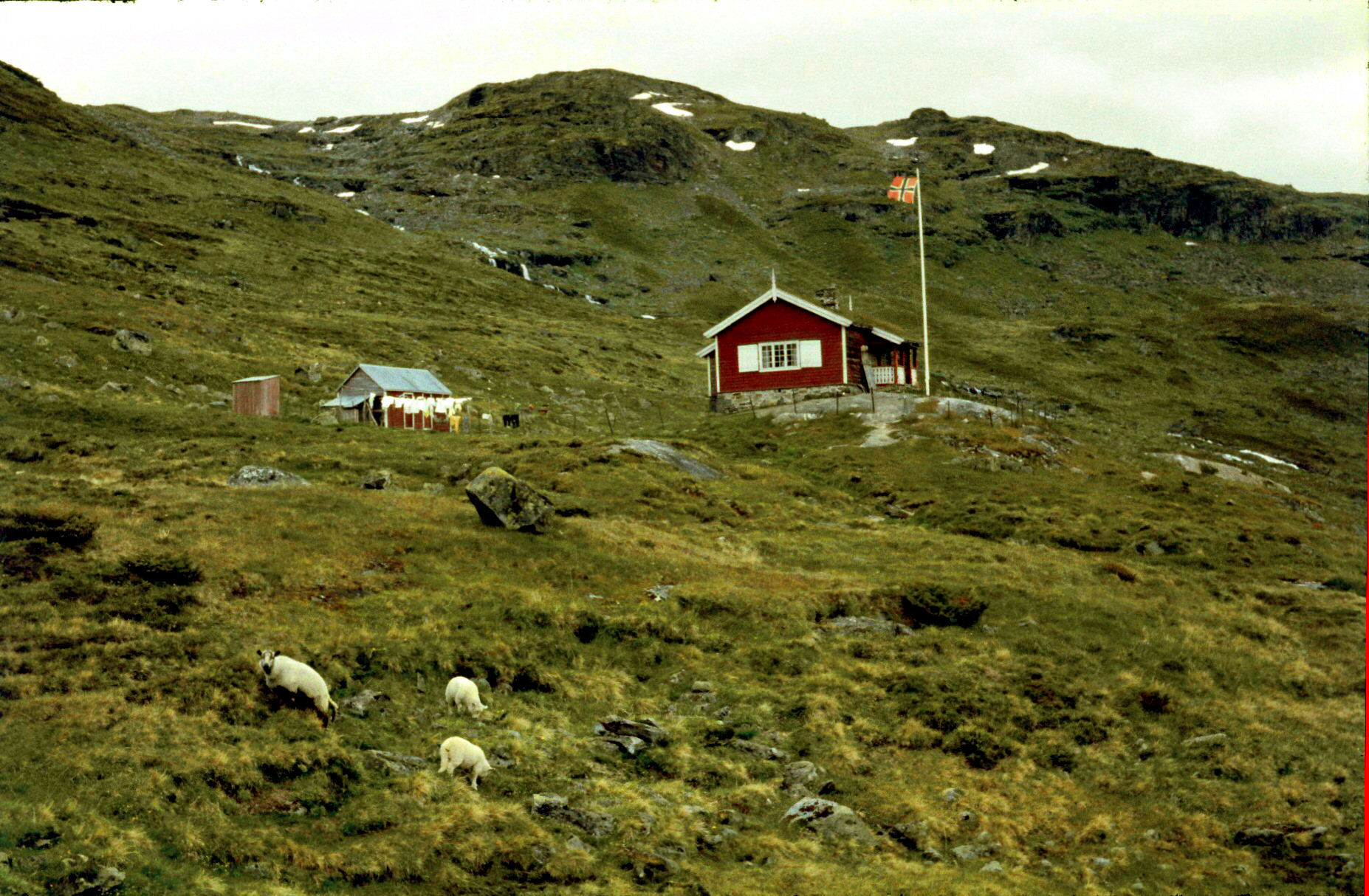
1961. Steinbergdalshytten (hytte = cabin) was erected by the [DNT] in 1895 and run by the DNT until 1960 when the young couple Jon and Signe Fimreite from Aurland took over and ran the hut until the end of the nineties. They built up the business to its present standard.

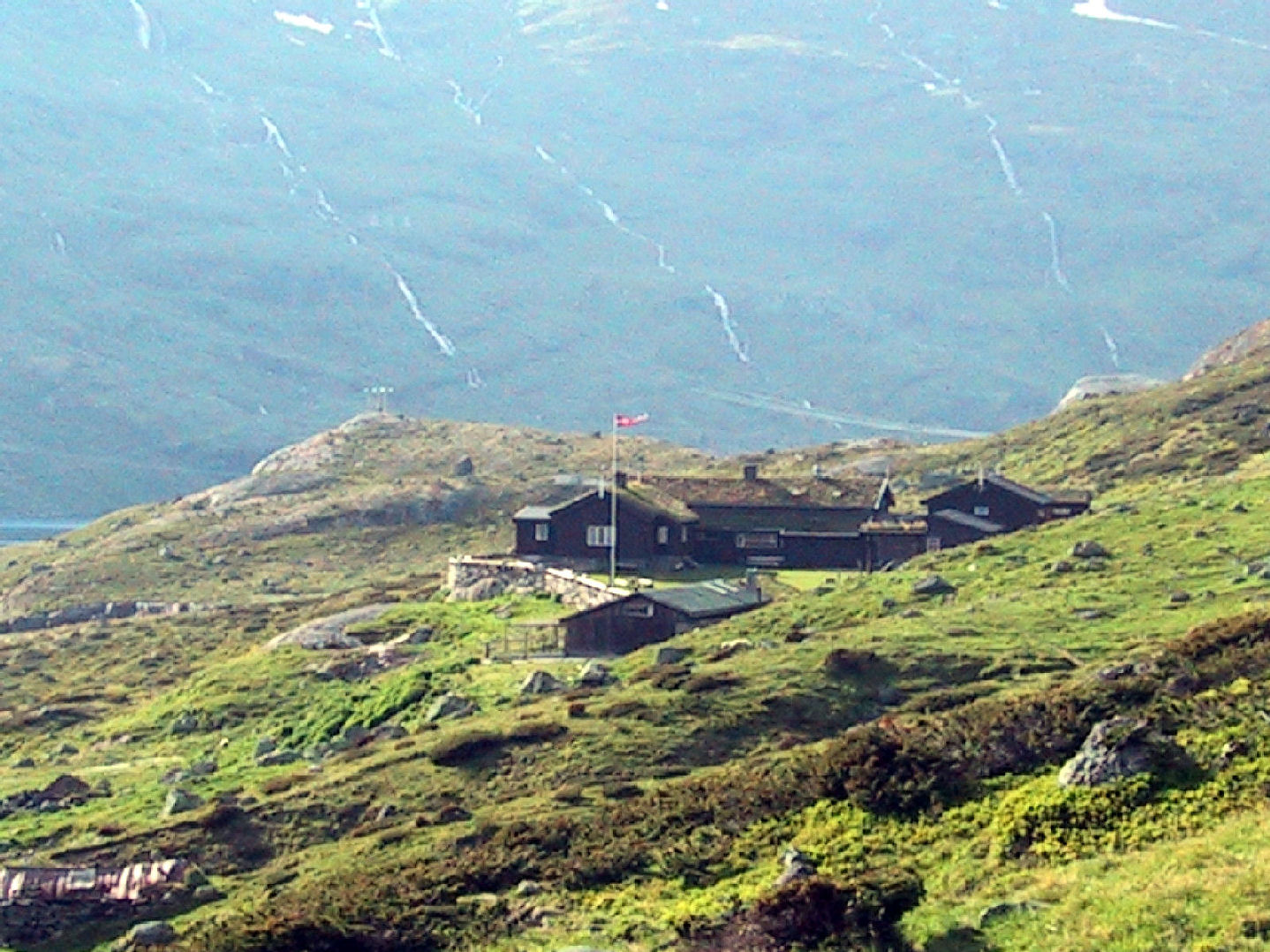
2001. Steinbergdalshytten. The original cabin is incorporated in the buildings and the veranda is now part of the dining room. The cabin can be seen to the left near the flagpole.

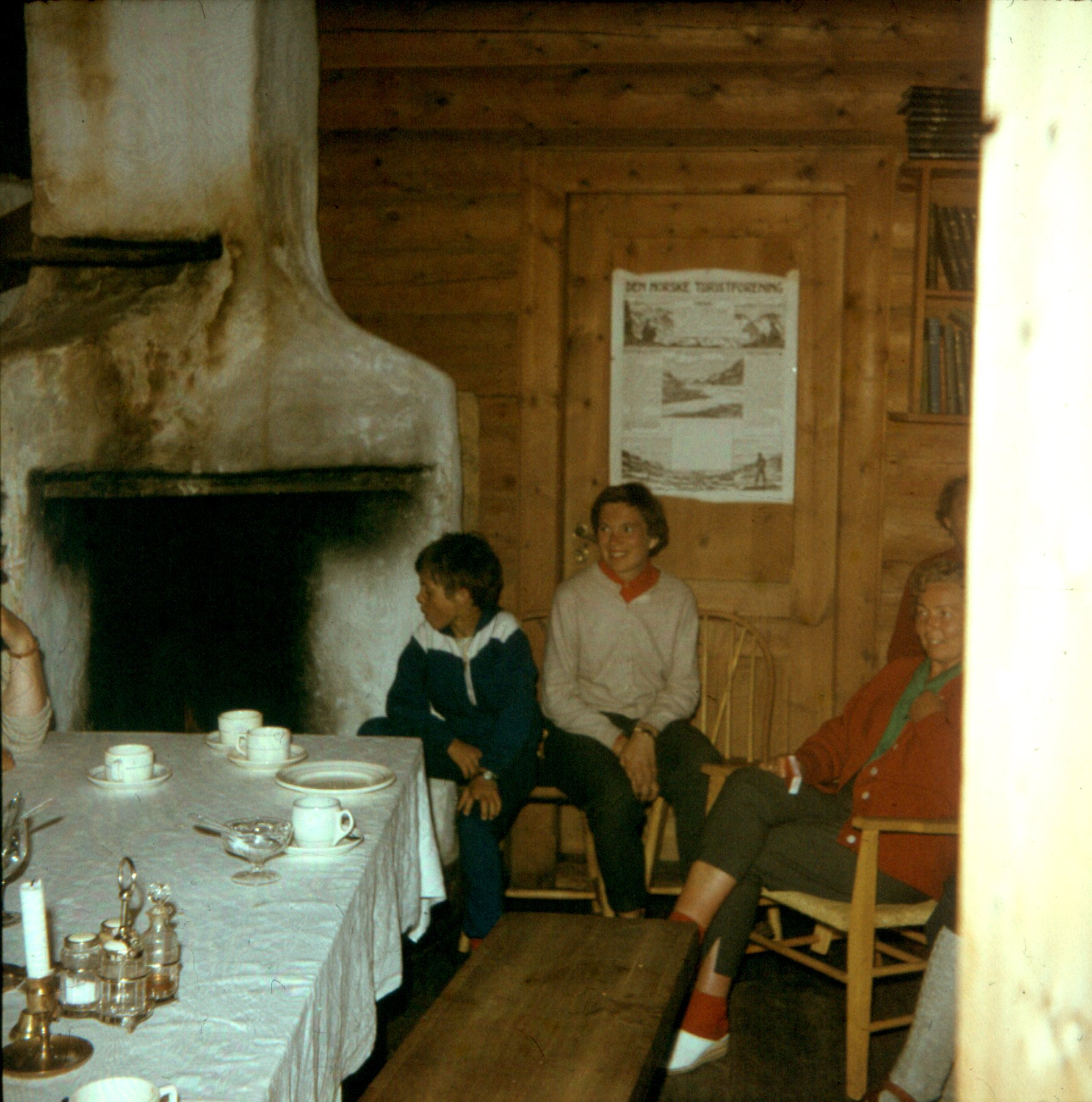
1960. Interior of the old Steibergdalshytten seen from the living room with the open fireplace, unchanged since 1895 when the cabin was erected. The door leads into one of the two bedrooms.

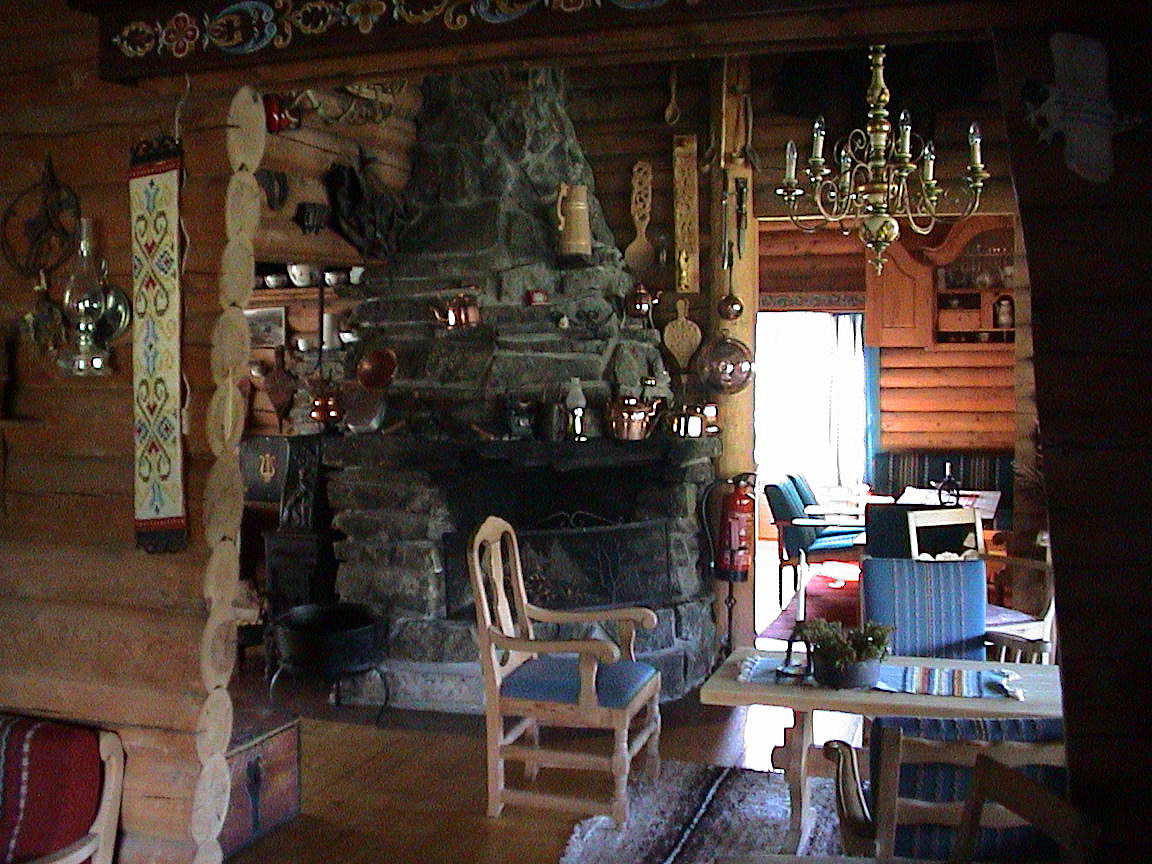
2001. The living room with the open fireplace as it appeared in 2001.

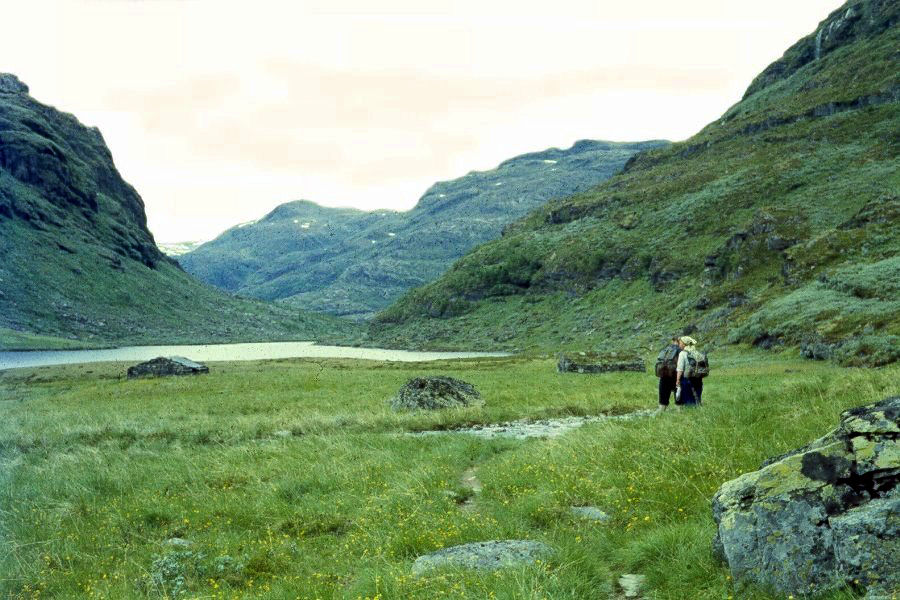
1961. Øyestøylene. Before the power development the old pack horse track followed the eastern bank of Øyestølsvatnet (964 m.)

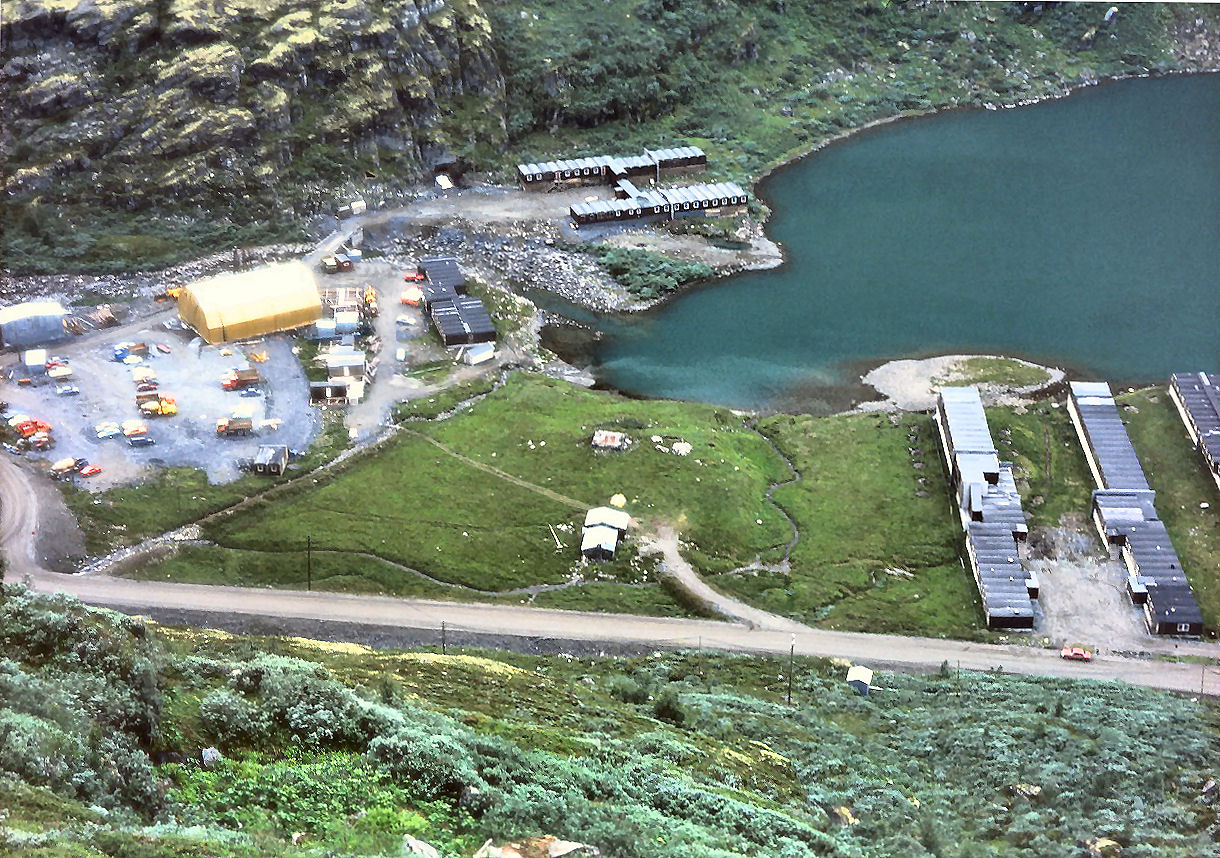
1978. Øyestøylene during construction. The two ”støl”s can still to be seen, as well as the old pack horse track where the tourist route used to be along the brook.

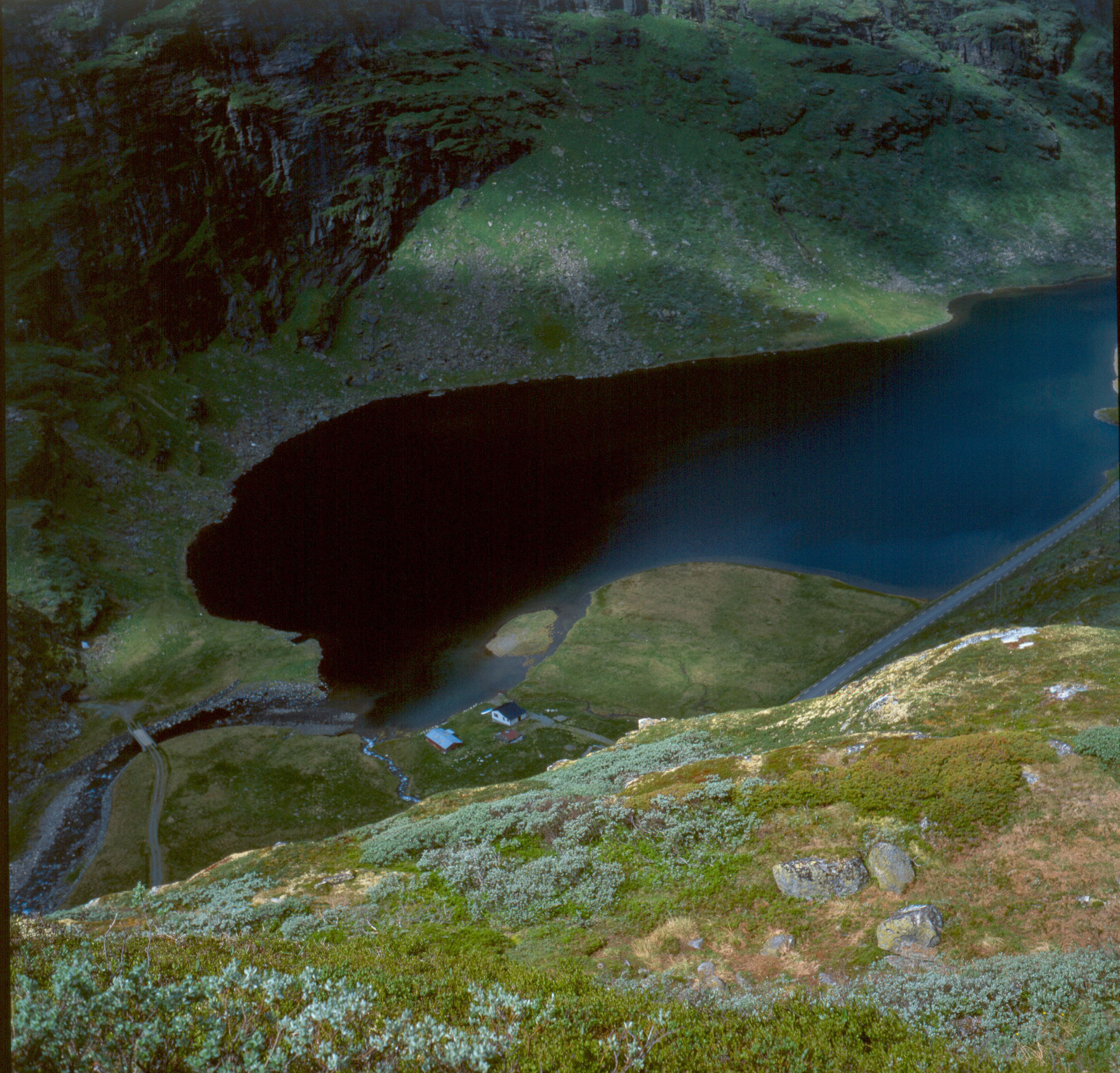
2001. Øyestøylene seen from the new tourist track at Skoradn.

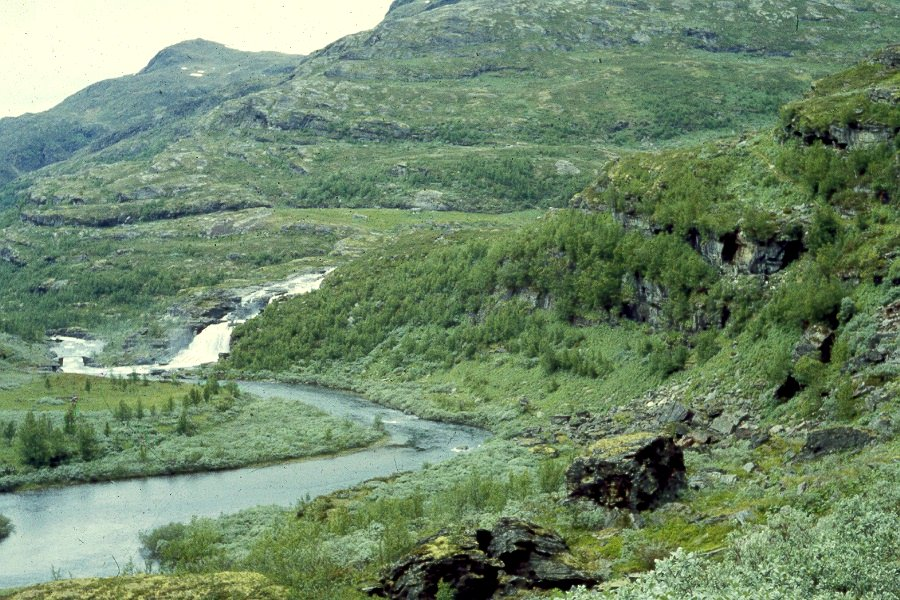
1961. Looking towards Grøna. The old path can be seen climbing upwards to cross Grøna above the waterfall. The new track meets the old at Grøna bridge and continues past Grønneseter (former dairy farm, now holiday cabin) and down the mountain side to Østerbø in Aurdalen.

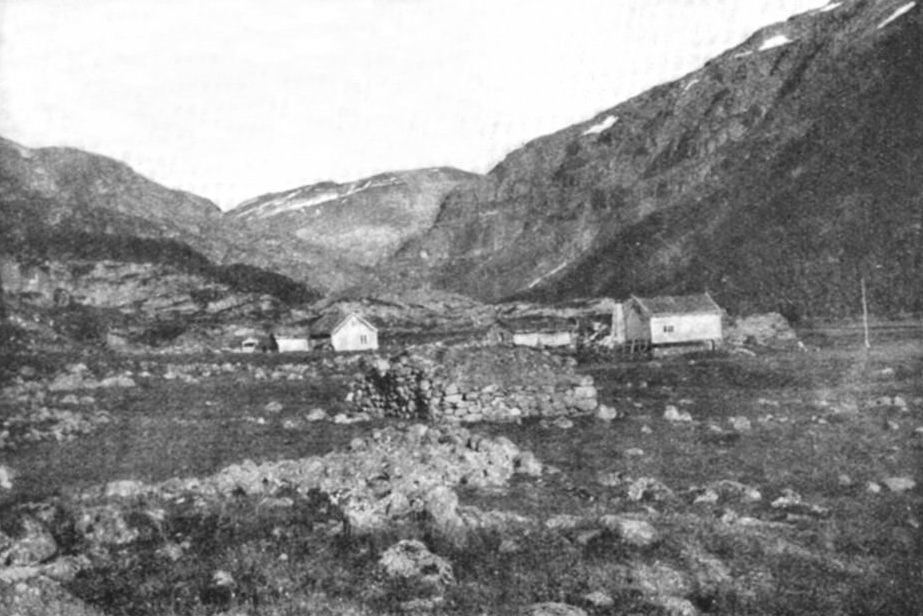
About 1900 farms at Øvstebø in Aurdalen became tourist cabins. The nearest of the two houses (to the right) is still there, built into the present Østerbø tourist cabin. The house served as the living room with the open fireplace until the seventies. Today the house is rebuilt for overnight guests. The old open fireplace is still intact in one of the rooms.

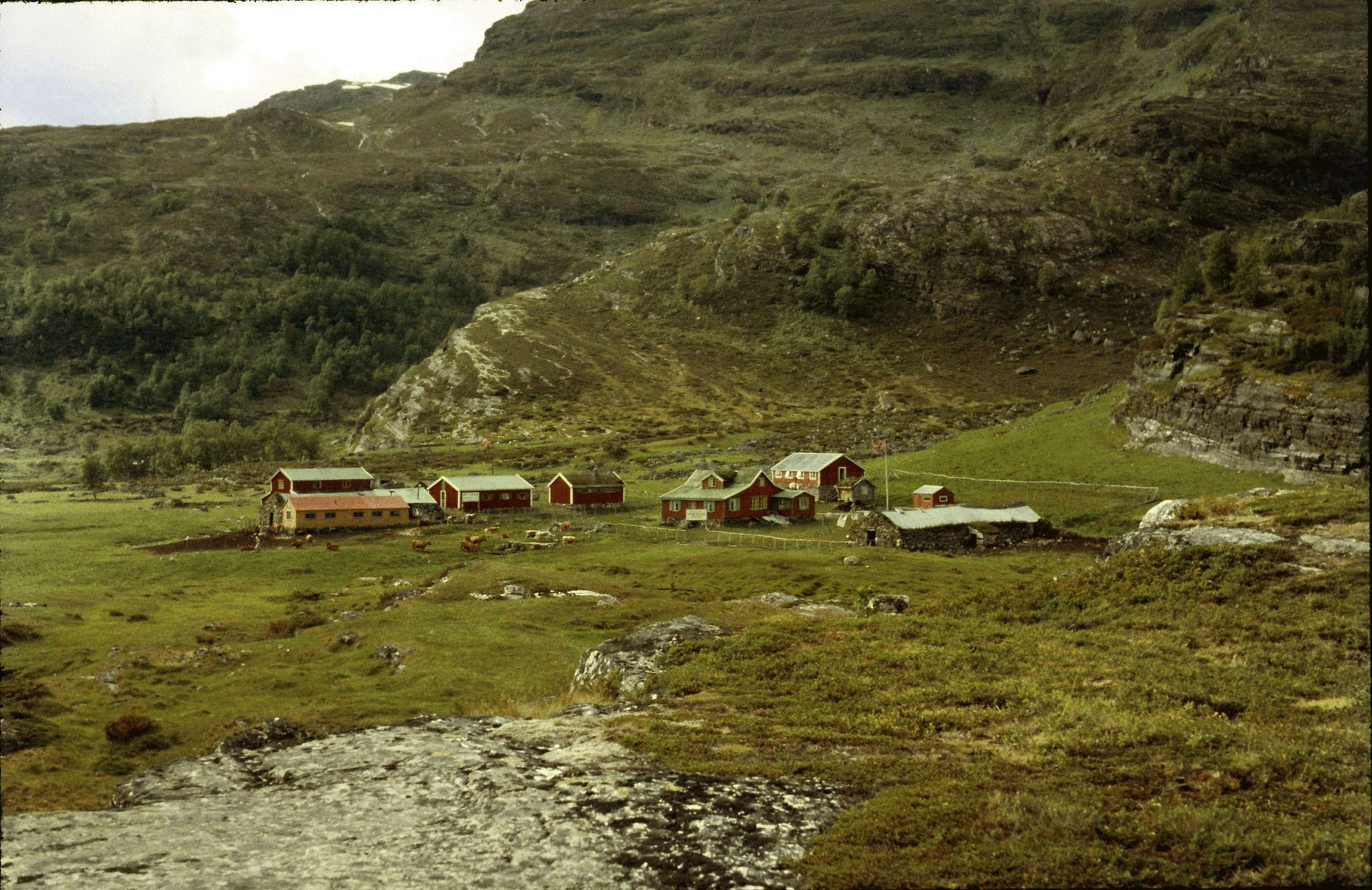
1961. Two tourist cabins at Østerbø, Østerbø Turisthytte and Østerbø Fjellstove. The small house in the middle of the picture is the original building from a previous picture. It served as living room with the open fireplace until about 1970 in Østerbø Turisthytte.

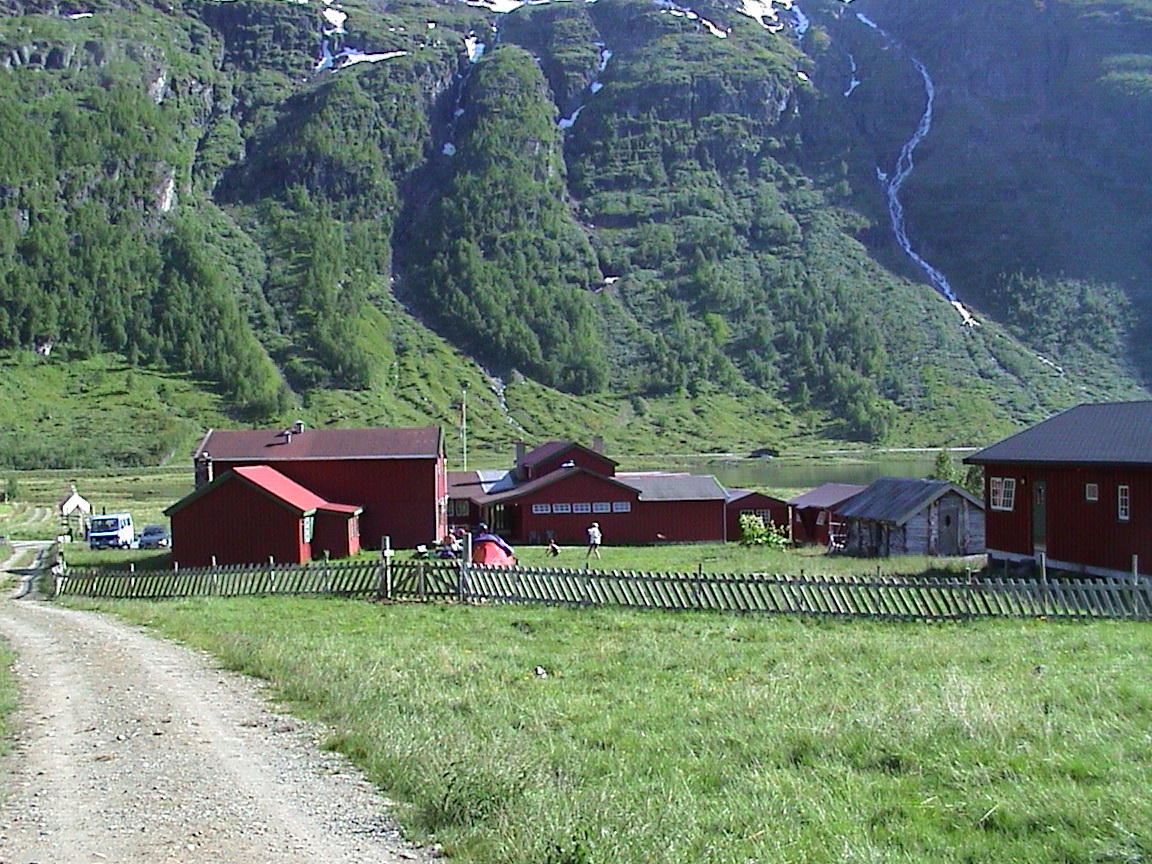
2001. Østerbø Turisthytte. The old main building to the left can be recognized because of the chimney.

== All-weather roads ==
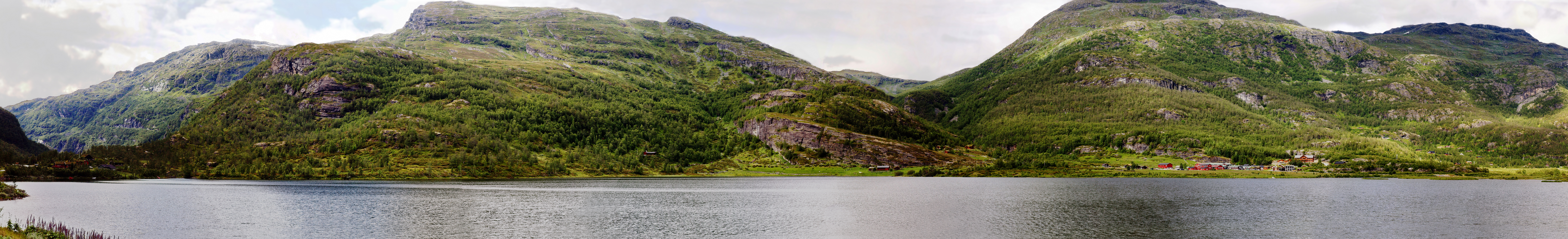
Østerbø in Aurdalen seen from the highway

An all-weather road was built through the valley to support the hydropower development. This road also served the purpose of connecting eastern Norway with the western Norway, remaining open all winter and removing dependency upon ferries. It followed, by and large, the old historic route between Aurland and Hol.

Through this road, Bergen was connected to Oslo by way of Voss, Vinje, Nærødalen, Aurland and through Aurlandsdalen to Geiteryggen. From there it passes through Vierbotn, Sveingardsbotn along Strandafjorden to Hol in Hallingdal. By this road, it was possible to avoid the Kvanndal Kinsarvik ferry over the Hardangerfjord and the Hardangervidda, which was difficult to keep open in the winter time. Even though most of the road could be built to standard width, the tunnels between Vassbygdi and Stonndal were not built to the standard width.

In November 2000 the new Lærdalstunnellen between Aurland Municipality and Lærdal Municipality opened the route of a new main road between Oslo and Bergen, reducing the impact on Aurlandsdalen and limiting further strain. Although the Aurlandsdalen road was one of the motivating factors for the 1969 decision, construction of the improved route made the need less important. But the environmental changes are essentially irreversible.

== Old traffic arteries ==
The tracks between Aurlandsvangen and Hol were by far the shortest routes between eastern Norway and western Norway. From ancient times Aurlandsdalen thus was one of the most important connections between Vestlandet and Østlandet. It was only recently that it became possible to drive cattle along the valley floor, made possible by blasting of a new passage, Sinjarheimsgaldene, in the cliff face at the Sinjarheim farm in 1870 and at Nesbøgaldene in the 1930s. Before 1930 cattle had to be driven over the mountain from Nesbø to Østerbø. At both Sinjarheimsgalden and Nesbøgaldene one had use wooden ladders to ascend across the vertical rock faces.

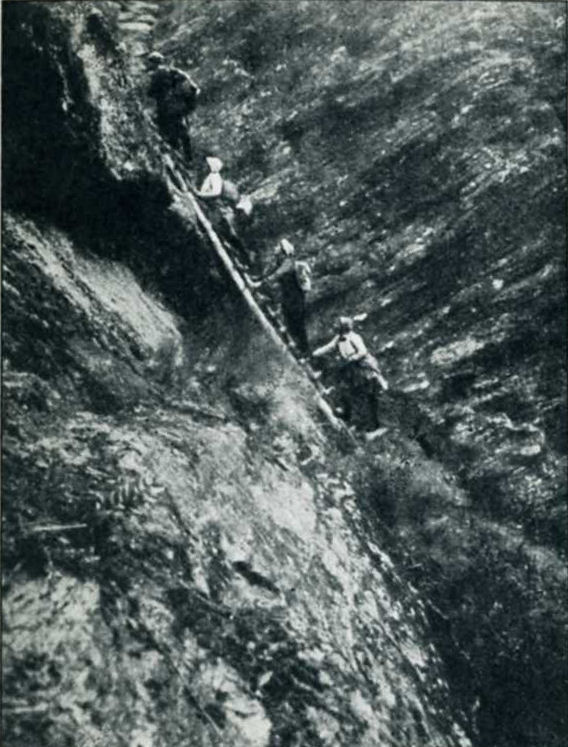
Fot. H. Tønsberg: Beginning of av 1900. Nesbøgalden.

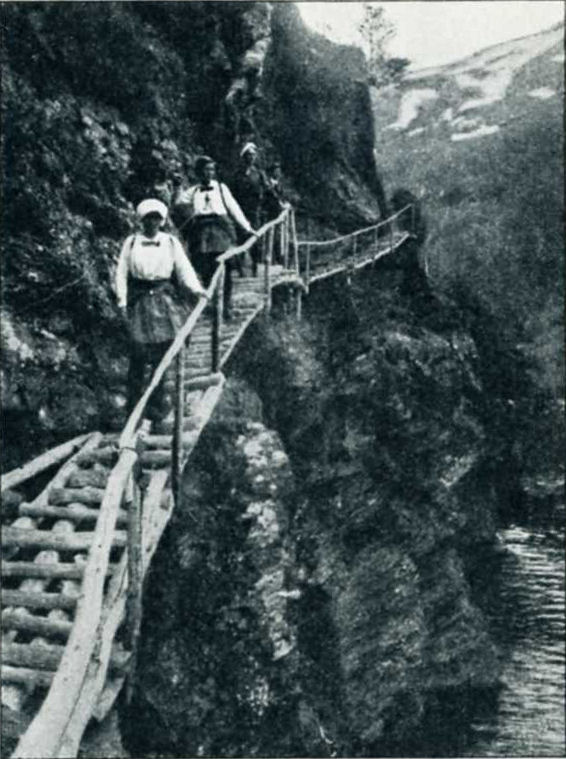
Fot. H. Tønsberg: Beginning of av 1900. Nesbøgalden.

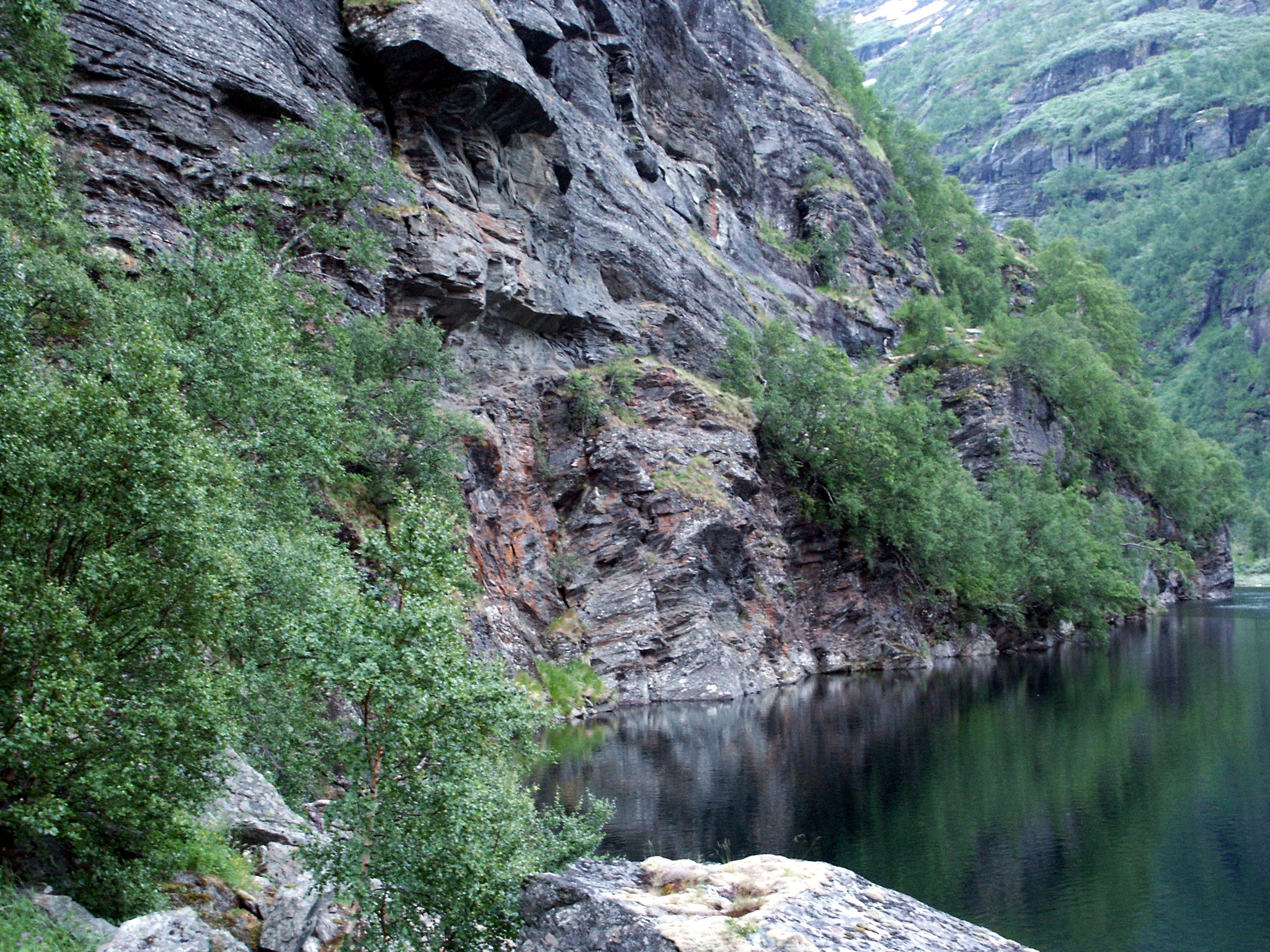
Nesbøgalden built by use of dynamite in the rock face above Nesbøvatnet lake.

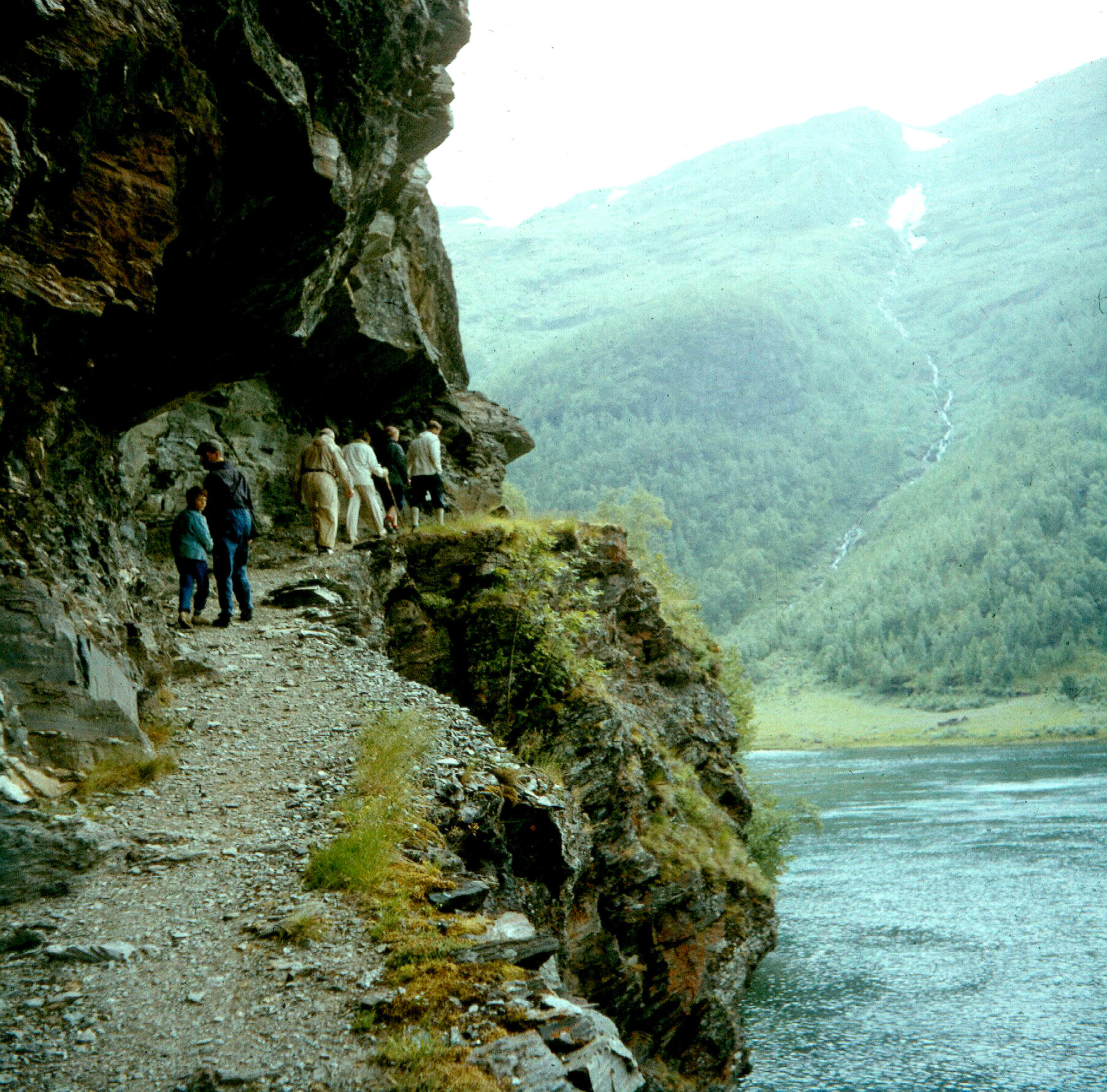
2001. Nesbøgalden heading toward Østerbø. 1960.

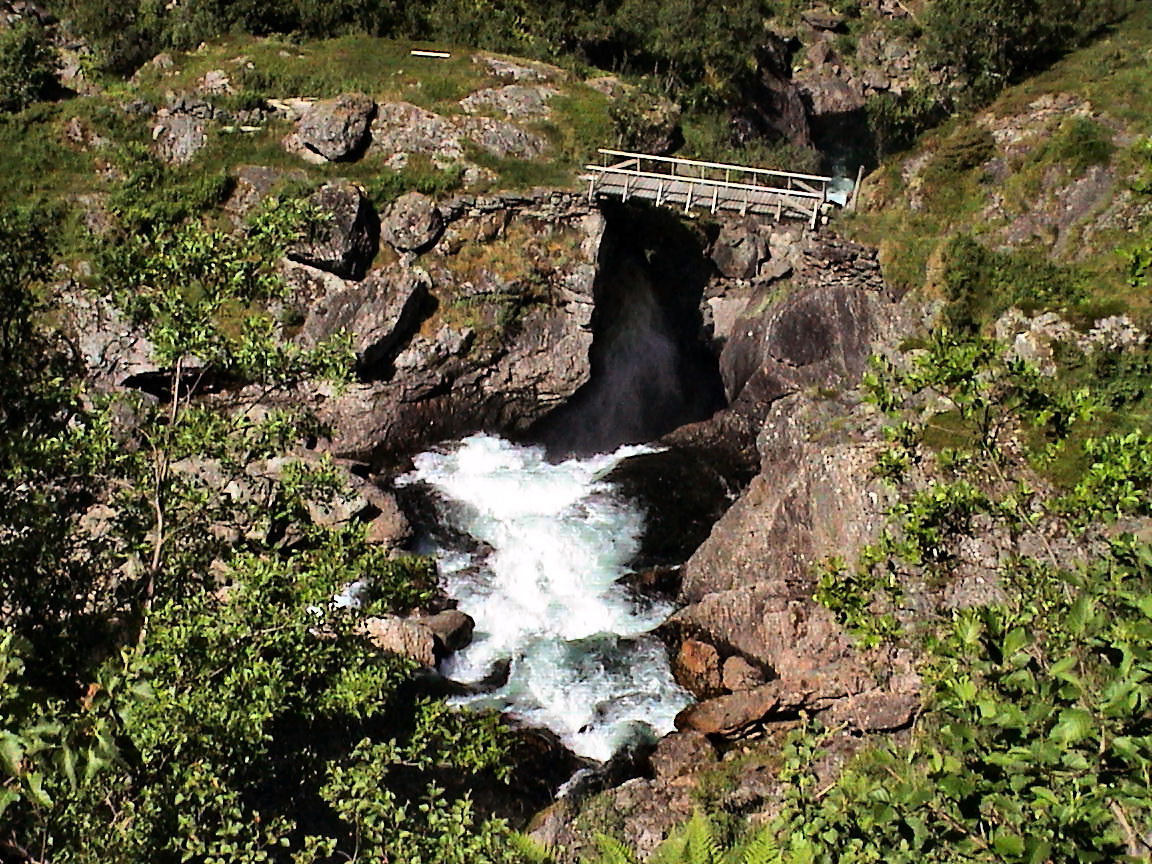
2001. Bridlebrui. The bridge over Aurlandselvi leading past Teigen to Stonndalen.

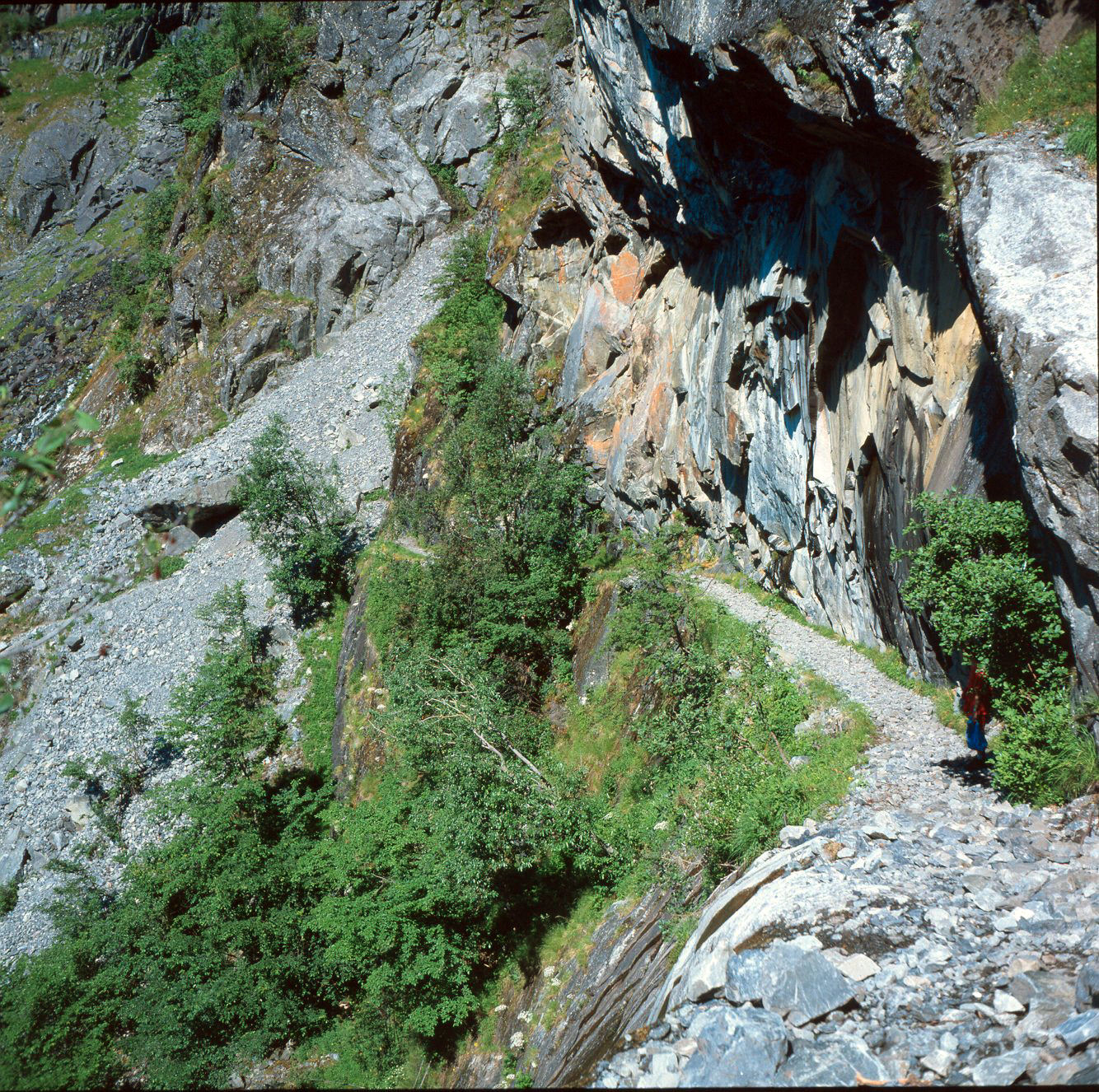
2001. Sinjarheimsgalden. The person by the shrub in the foreground gives a sense of the scale.

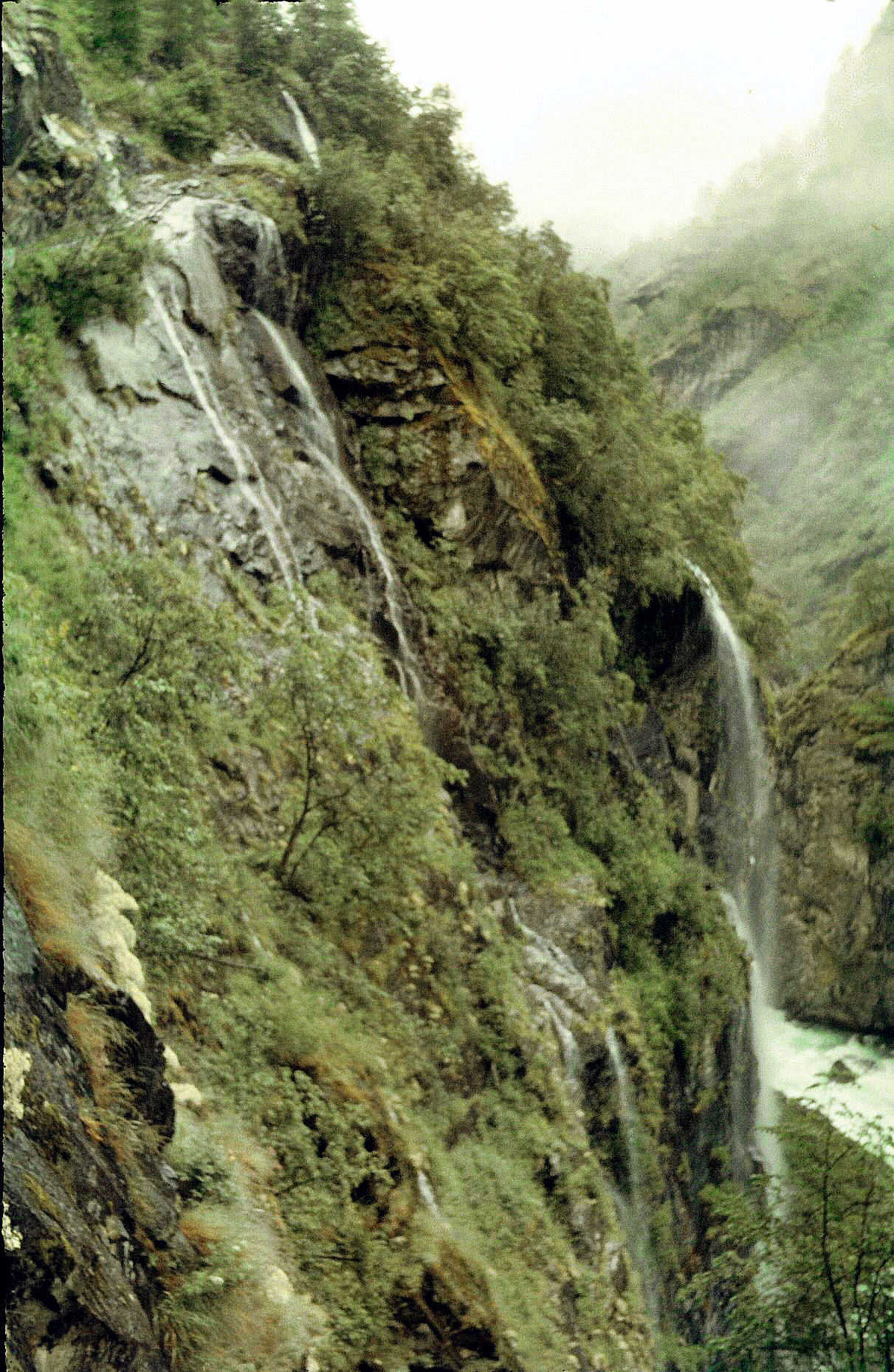
1961. Sinjarheimsgalden. The new path is blasted into the rock face in the upper left corner. The path has been destroyed several times by rockslides.

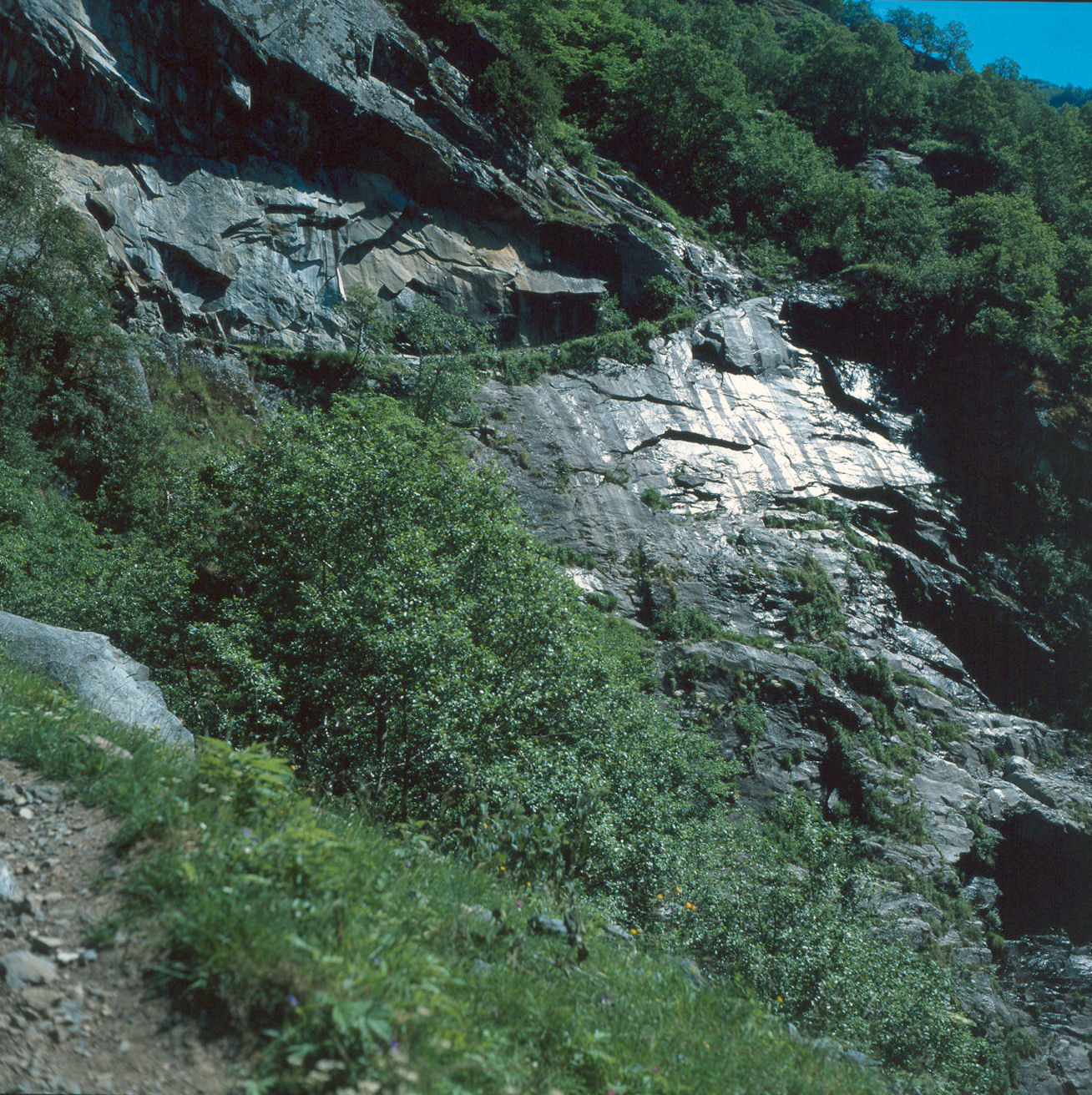
2001. Sinjarheimsgalden

Before 1870 the cattle drives had to take the long detour, either over the Langfjellet mountain and down to Østerbø or over Stonndalen to Stemberdalen, or alternatively over Låvidalen to Geiteryggen. From there the journey continued down to Vierbotn via Sveingardsbotn further along Strandafjorden to Hol in Hallingdal.

=== Old tracks ===
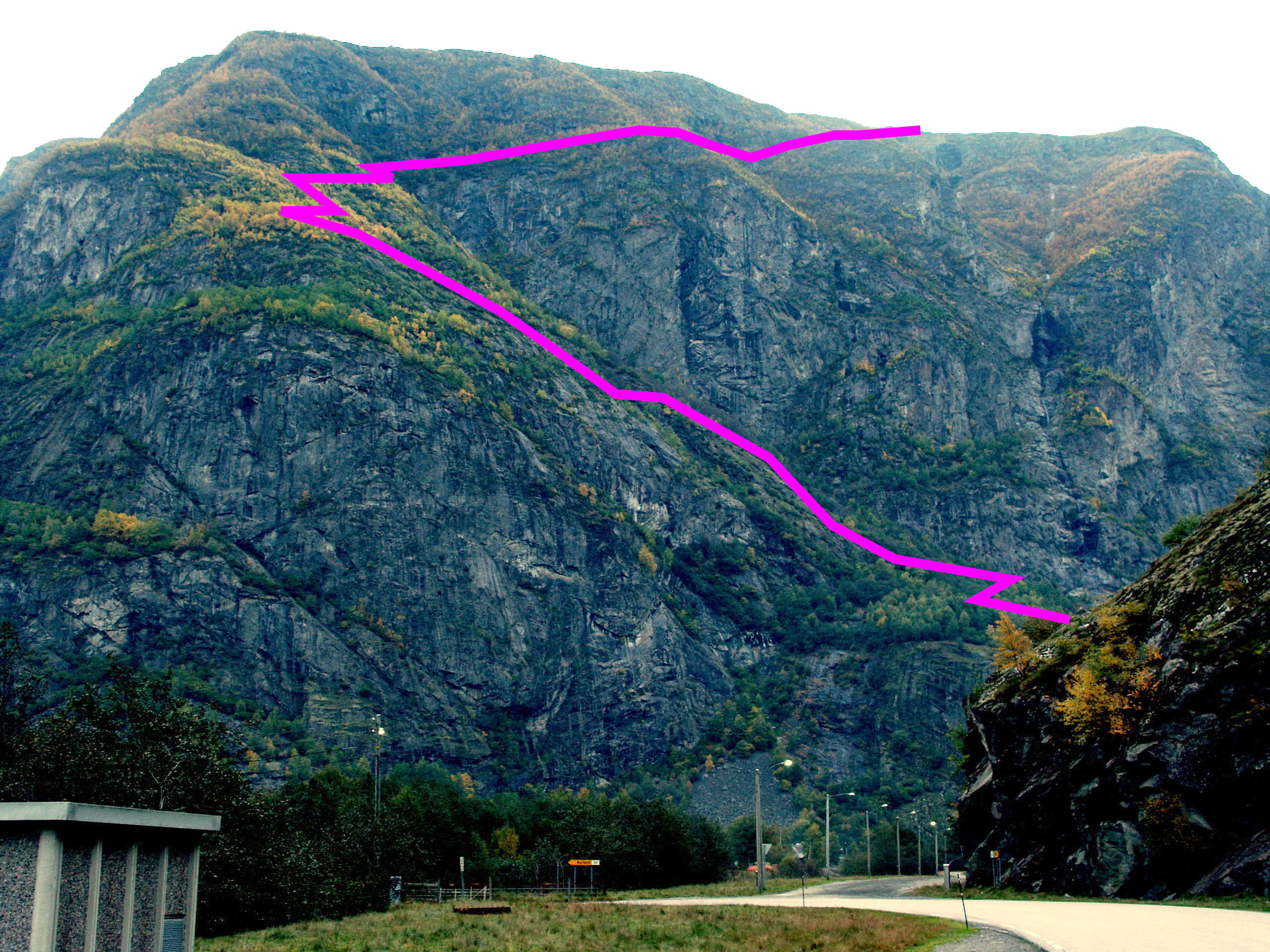
The alternative cattle trail (5) from Vassbygdi (roughly) upwards Eisingaberget, to avoid the unpassable Sinjarheimsgalden (to the right in the picture). See also detailed map

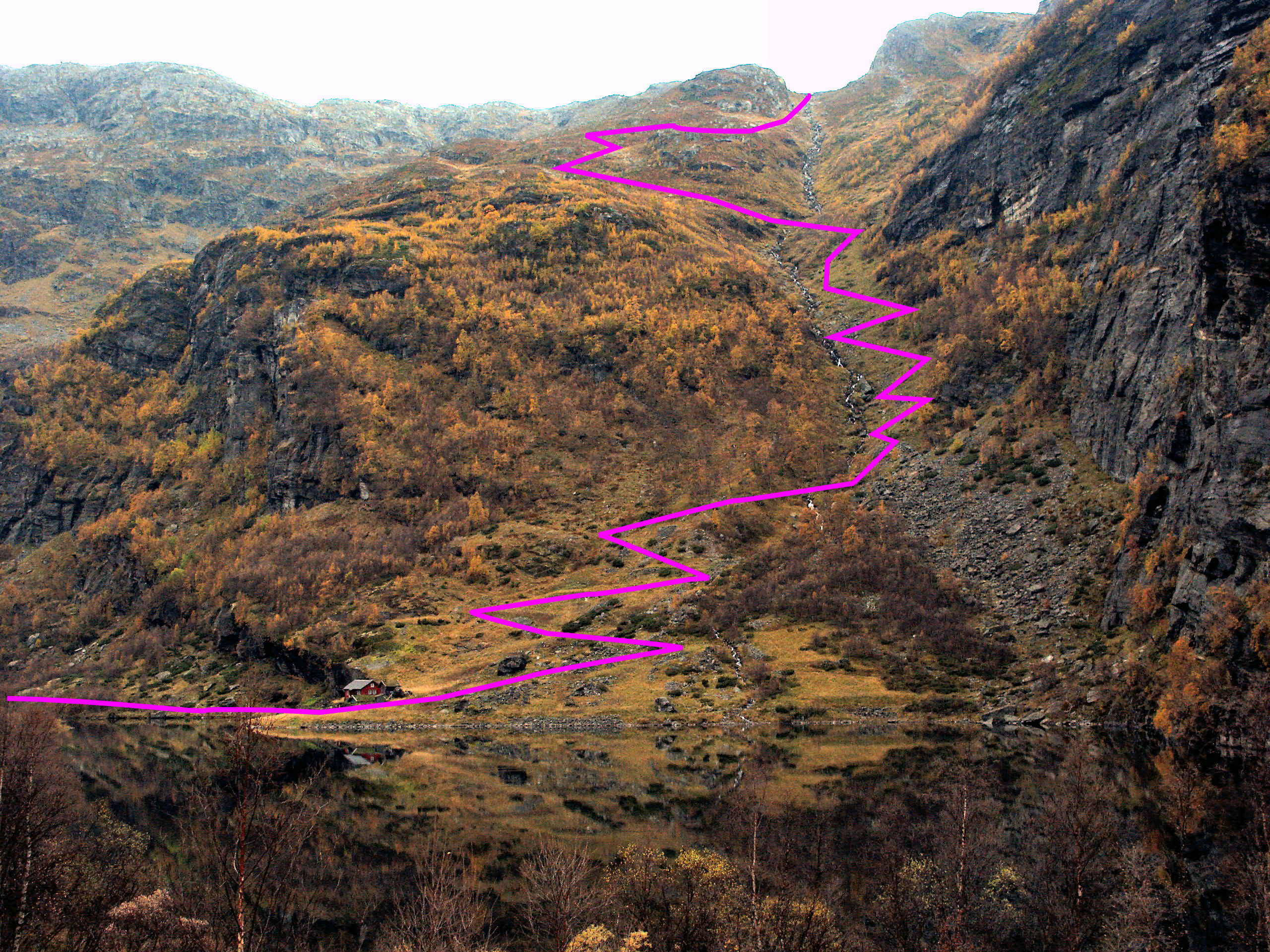
The route (roughly) upwards Gravadalen one had to use before a passable path was built in the rockface (at the right side) of Nesbøgalden about 1930. This route led over the mountain and down to Østebø in Aurdalen

The most important tracks were (see map - the numbers give no indication of their relative importance):

1. (Red marking): The old and modern tourist track follows the valley. Bjødnastigen was closed for many years due to landslide. It is now possible to choose an alternative route to the path following the river under Holmen where the path separates at Tirtesva just after passing Nesbø farm (red). After the hydropower development, the path was relocated higher up on the hillside from Steinbergdalshytten to avoid submersion, proceeding until the new path meets the old path at the bridge across Grøna. From there the path follows the historic track down the mountainside to Østerbø
2. (Not shown on the map): A historic route passed through Aurlandsvangen, Kleppane, Låvi, Låvisdalen, over Grindsfjellet mountain, past Bottolfstølen and Raunedokken, over Repparhaugene, through Vetledalen to Rausmesdalen, further to Hednedalen and back to the track from Vindedalen, and then eastwards to Geiteryggen along Strandafjorden to Hol Municipality.
3. (Orange marking): In Rausnesdalen there was a junction to another historic path that was extensively used. It went up to Fossane, Langevatnet, Mellomvatni, Svartevatnet, Geiteryggen to Strandefjorden.
4. (Violet markering): Another historic junction was in the bottom of Låvisberget where the track led down to Vassbygdi and further to Midje, up Nordalen then turning east and further south east over Langafonna, Grodalen and downwards in the Langedalen past Herdestølen to Østerbø.
5. (Grey marking): An historic route proceeded up the precipitous Eisingaberget (see detailed map) to avoid Sinjarheimsgalden, which did not become passable until 1870; before that time it was not passable to cattle drives. By choosing the path by Eisingane ("støl"s) and further over Langedalsfjellet one avoided both Sinjarheimsgalden, Bjønnestigen and Nesbøgalden.
6. (Green marking): Those who chose to follow the valley had to cross the river at Almen, proceed along the south side past Teigen and then back to the north side over Bridlebrui (green).
7. (Blue green marking): Still another route proceeded through Stonndalen. This route was probably in use from about 1850.

== Settlements ==
The configuration of settlements is typical for the rural farm culture of early Norway. Archeological indications show that the settlements are much older than the written sources indicate – some dating to before the Middle Ages. This section provides detail to allow perspective on the conditions and mores of former times.

As late as in 1850 there were 10 farms and cotters subfarms in Aurlandsdalen altogether: Almen, Sinjareim, Teigen, Berekvam, Skori, Nesbø, Vikaneset, Aurviki and two farms in Aurdalen (Østerbø).

=== Sinjarheim ===
First known farmer was named simply Per, and first appears in records in 1611. The typical name by which he would have been known was Per Sinjarheim (or Per living on Sinjarheim). The last recorded farmer was Ingebrigt Jonassen Rinde born 1873 – died 1935.

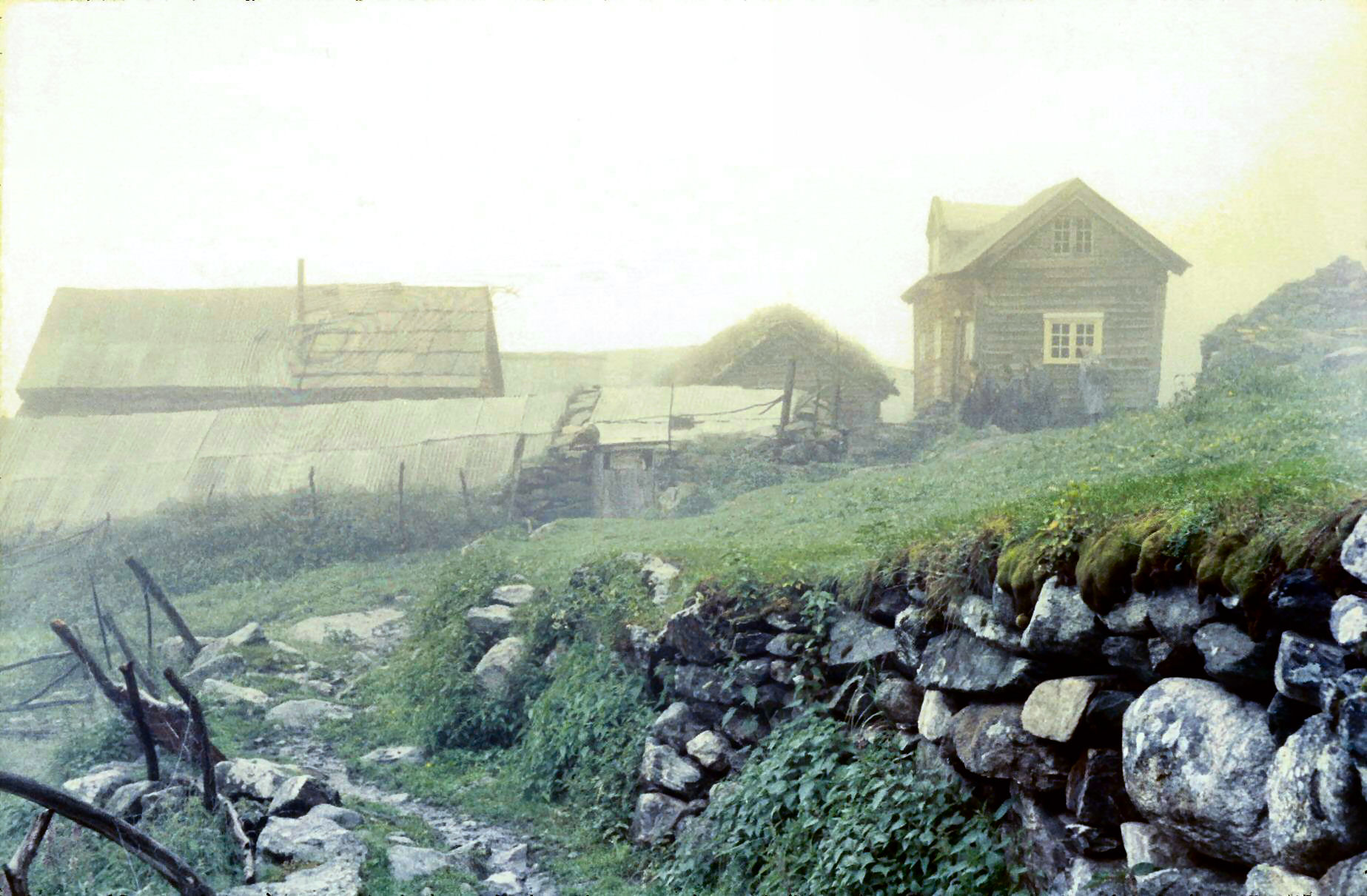
1961. The farm Sinjarheim. Already as early as mid-1800 the farm was in decay. The last residents moved in the beginning of the twentieth century and was in use as summer farm until about 1940. Knut Sønnerheim (born 1913 - dead 1976) who ran Østerbø Turishytte for a generation, was born on the farm and spent his first years there.

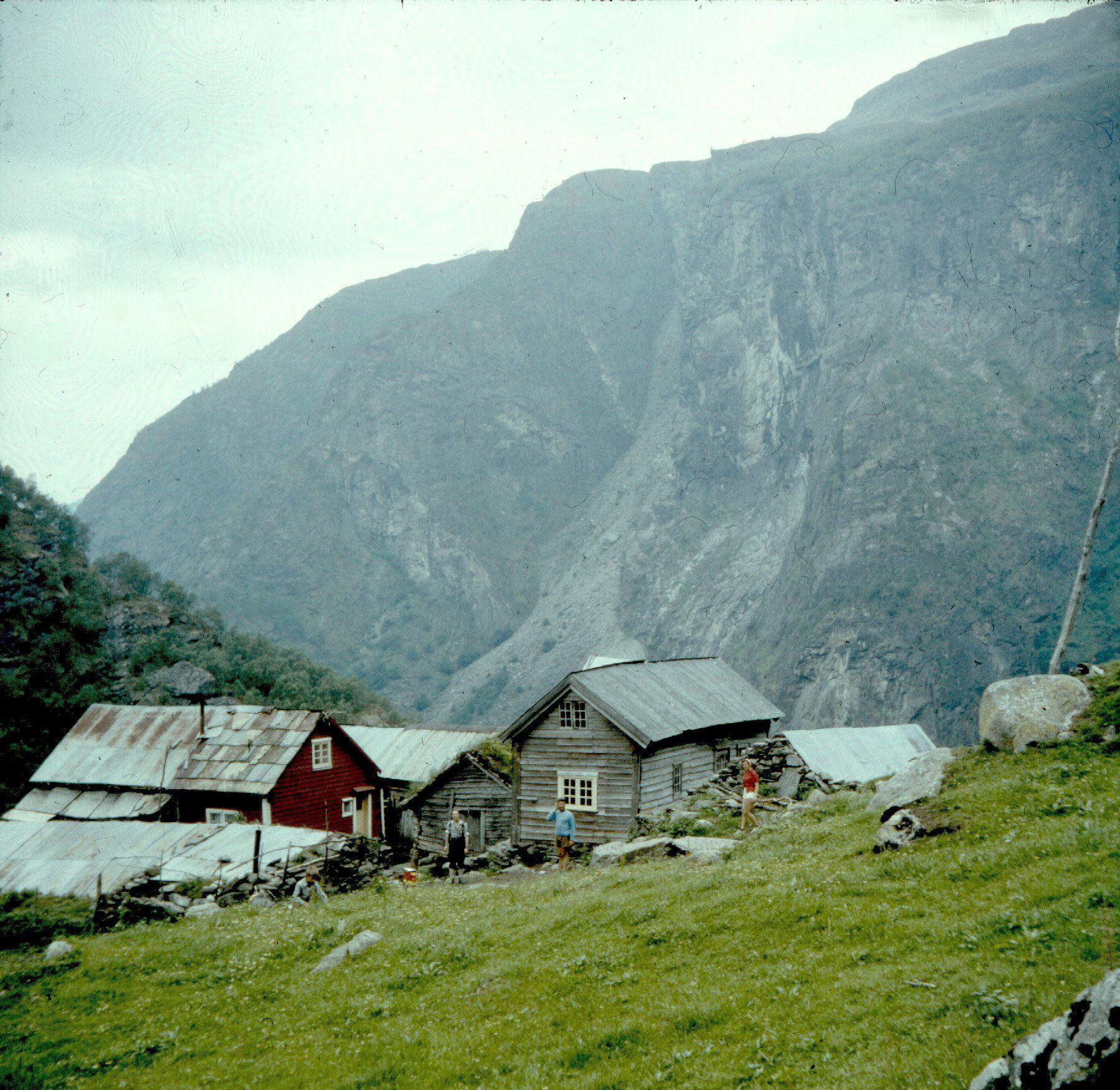
1960. Sinjarheim is situated at the edge of a precipice where the bottom of the abyss was filled with the foaming Aurlandselvi. Due to this it was common practice to secure the children with ropes. The trees in the background to the left are on the other side of the valley. The mountain in the background is Eisingaberget where cattle drives were led before the passage in Sinjarheimsgalden was built and passable for cattle drives in 1870.

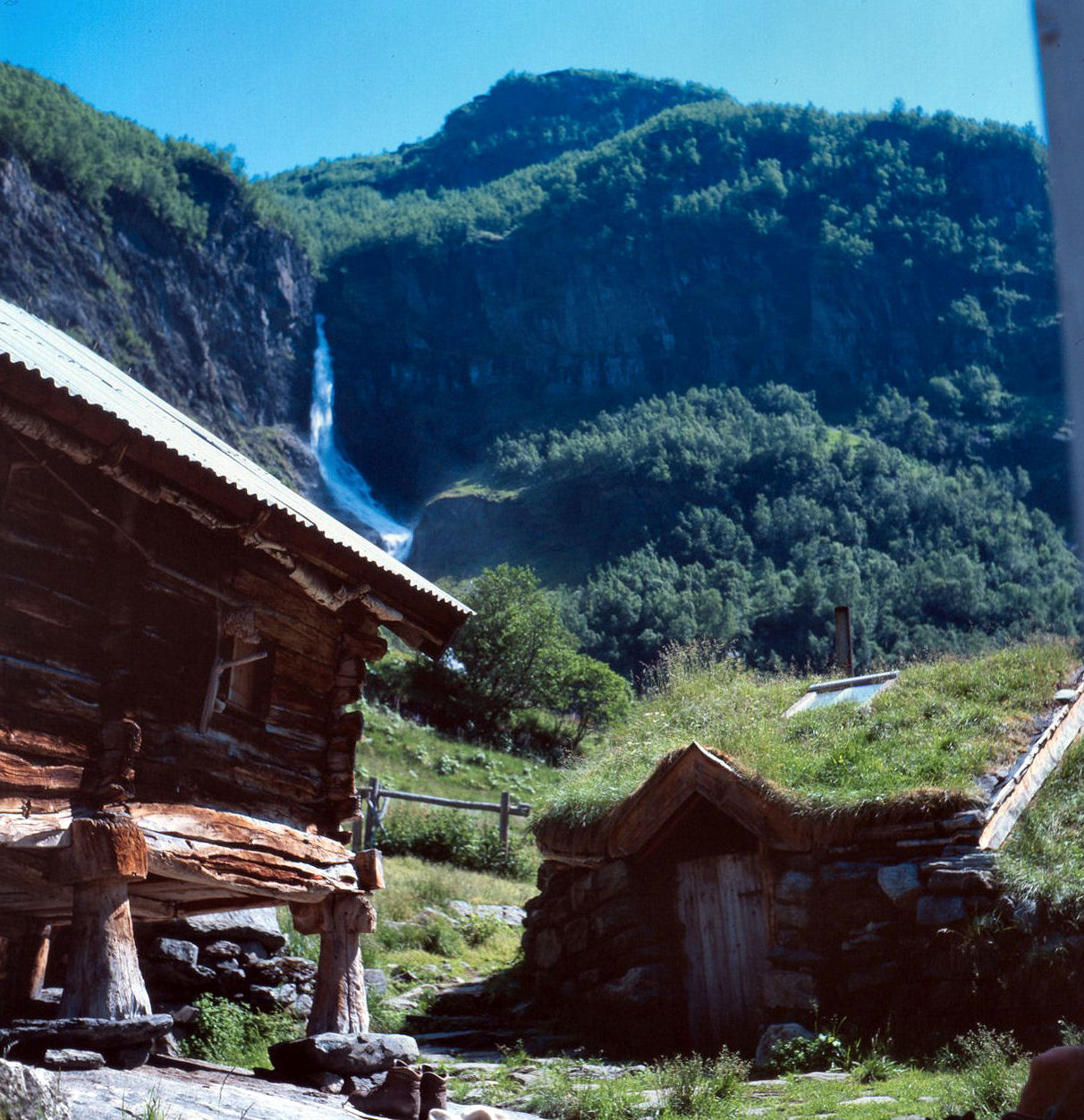
2001. The old houses was restored about 1980 by volunteers as historically significant dwellings.

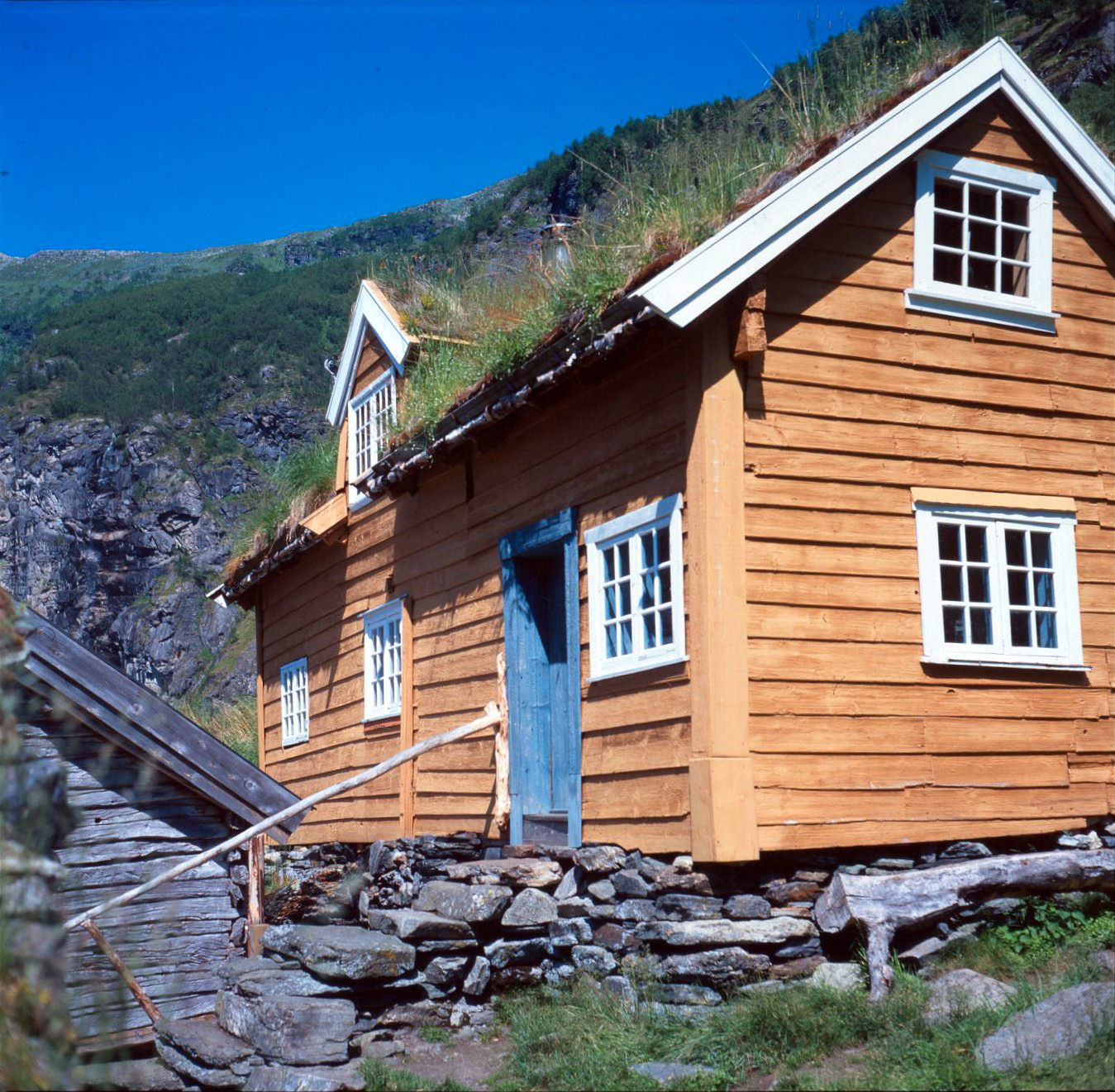
2001. Main building at Sinjarheim has been clad with timber boards and painted by voluntary communal work to preserve historically significant structures.

=== Almen ===
The cotters (crofters) subfarm under Sinjarheim was Almen. First known cotter was Magne Sult, also mentioned as Magne Olsen Almen, born 1718 – died 1753. Last resident at Almen was Simon Johannessen Belle born 1830 - died 1912. The farm today consists of a small house, Almastova and a small barn.

Almastova is a small one room jointed timber house at about 3.5 x 4.0 m. It is said that Almastova is the oldest existing wooden building in Aurlandsdalen. According to architect Arne Berg at NIKU the shape of the joints indicate that the building probably was erected about 1600. The building previously had wooden flooring, now lost. Beside the door there is an external chimney of stone masonry.

In 2004 Aurlandsdalen Kulturlandskap (Aurlandsdalen Culture Landscape) by Aurland Naturverkstad (Aurland Nature Workshop) 42.000 N. Kr. (£3,500) from Norsk Kulturminnefond (Norwegian Cultural Monuments Foundation) for restoration of Aalmastova.

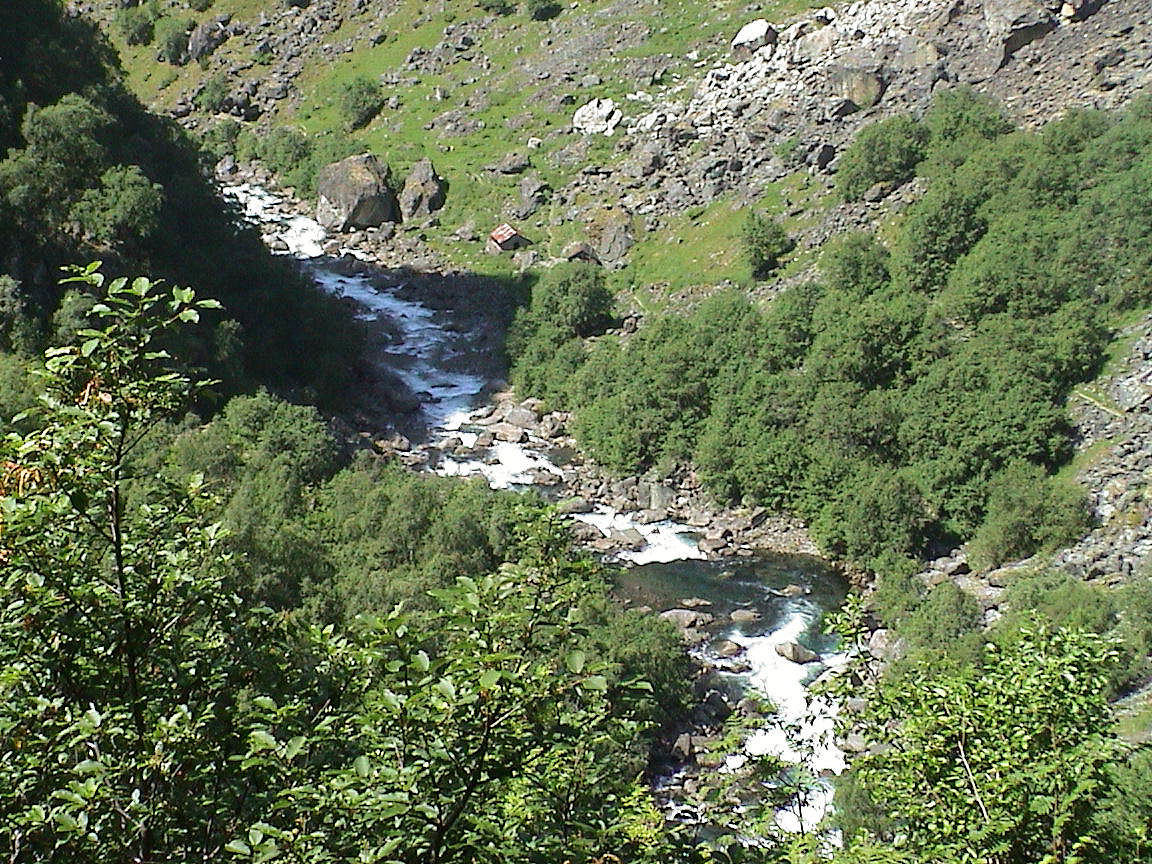
2001. Almen. The path downwards from Sijarheimsgalden passes between Almastova and the barn. The barn is clearly visible. The roof of Almastova is visible under a big boulder.

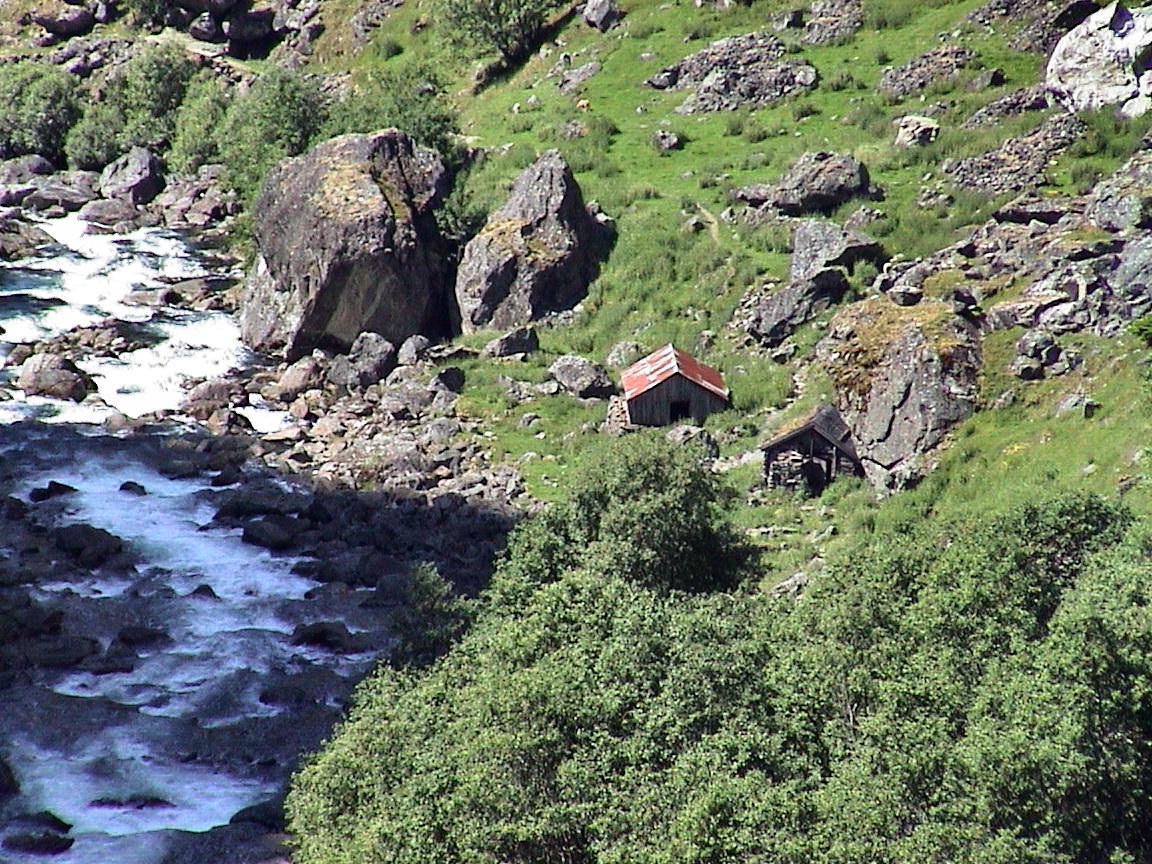
2001. Here is Almastova clearly visible under the boulder which protects the house from rockslides and avalanches.

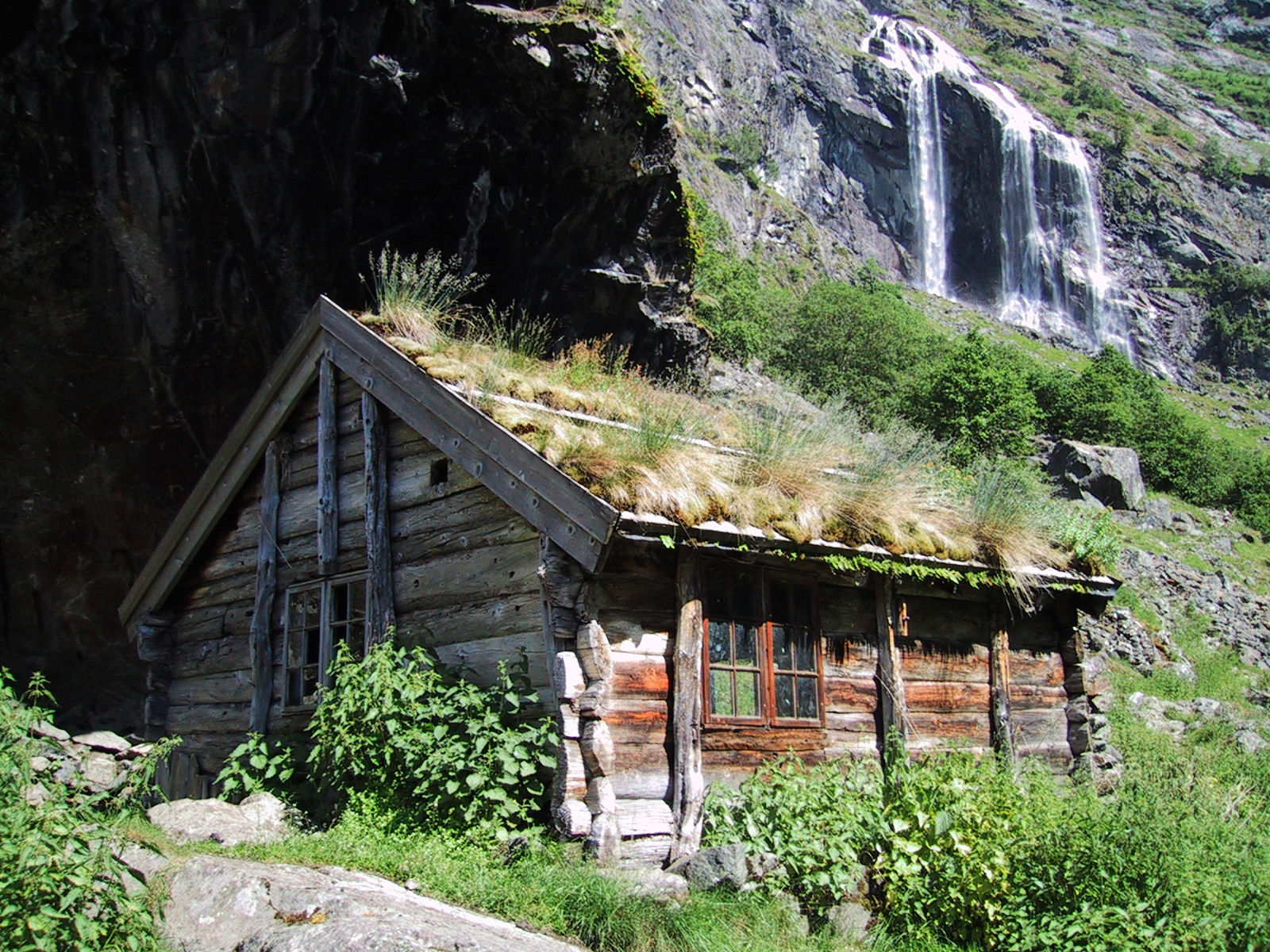
2001. Almastova is not big, just one room, and gives evidence of the dangerous and modest lives the people, just a few generations back, endured in this valley.

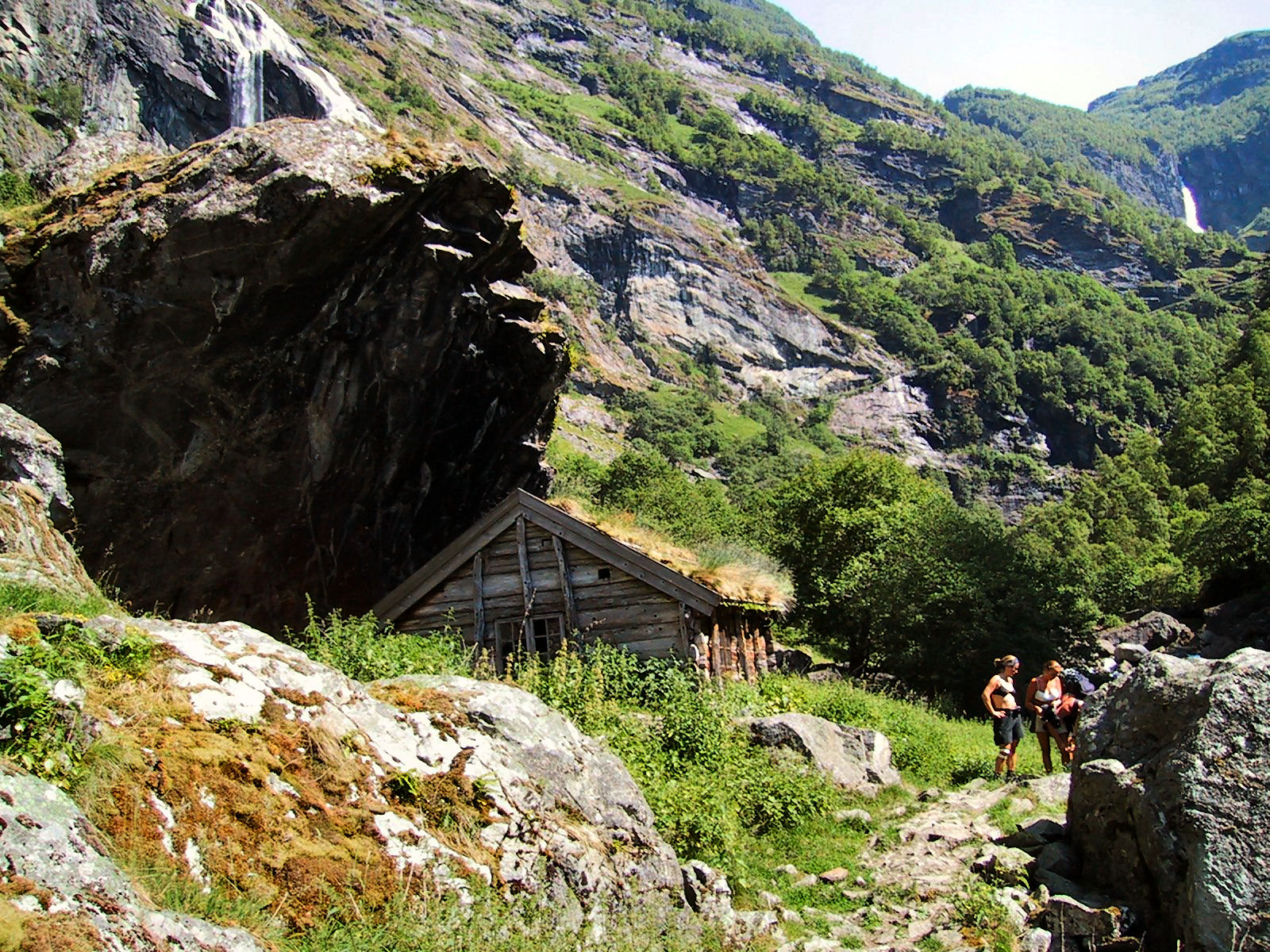
2001. Almastova. In the background, in the light part of the rock face, one can catch a glimpse of Sinjarheimsgalden. Sinjarheim is situated just outside the right corner where the Veiverdalsfossen (foss = waterfall) can be seen in the background.

=== Teigen ===
The earliest recorded farmer was Peder Ellingsen Teigen born 1632 - dead 1661. Last resident is Lars Knudsen Teigen, born 1796 - dead 1848.

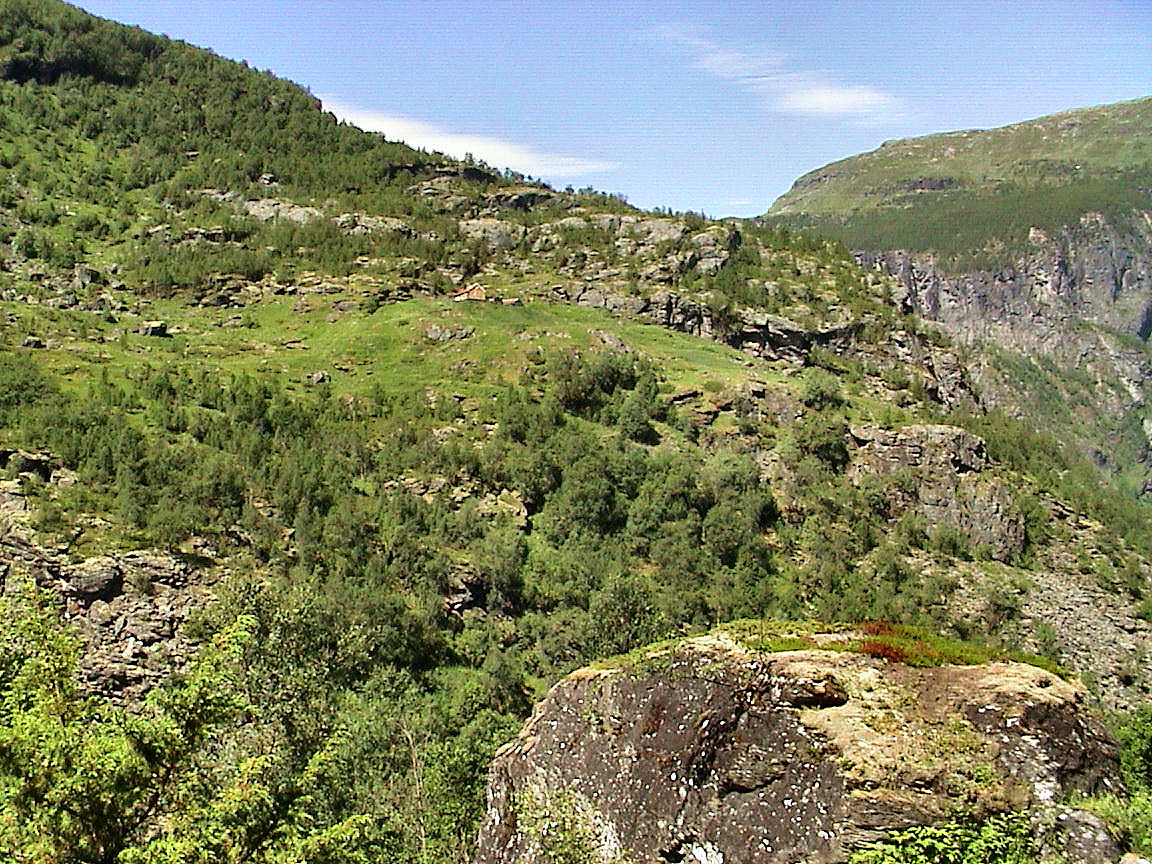
2001. The path to Stonndalen is crossing Aurlandselvi via Bridlebrui and is passing close nearby Teigen.

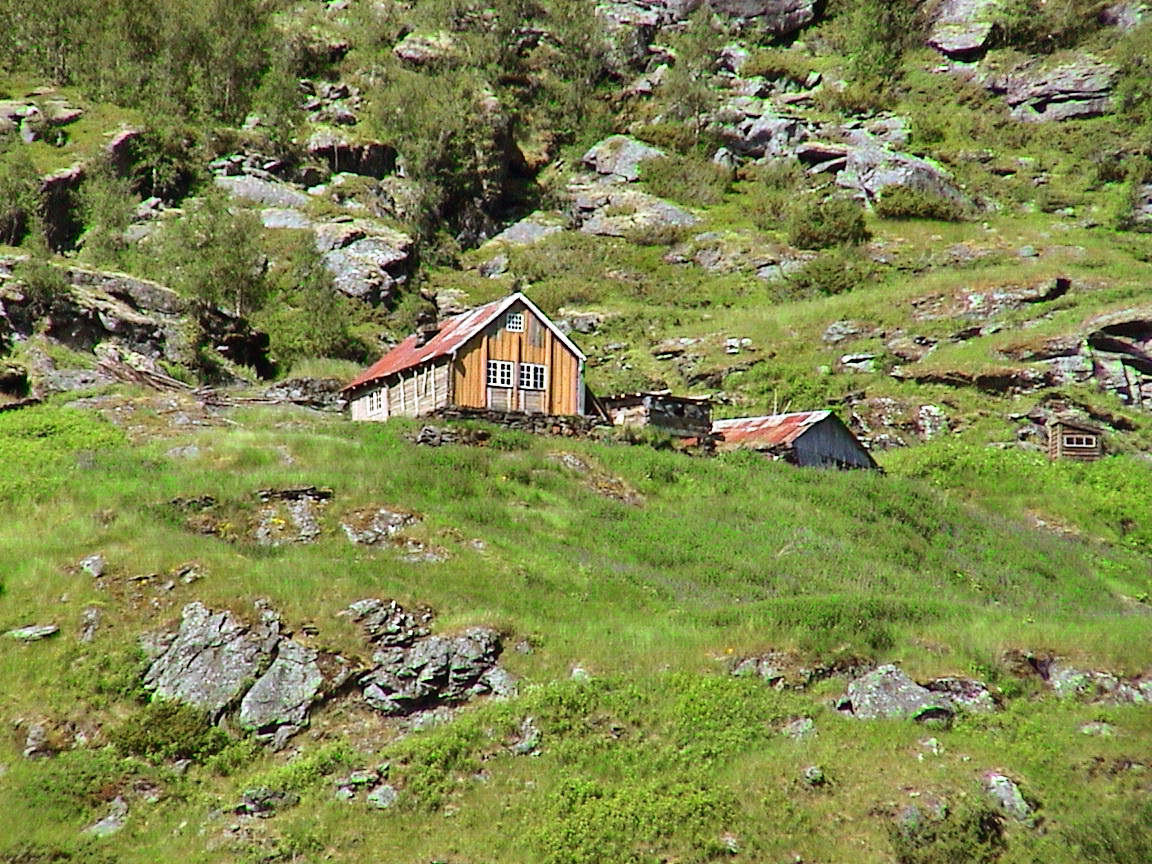
2001. Teigen, seen from the path to Sinjarheim, above Bridlebrui.

=== Berekvam ===
The earliest recorded farmer was Gudbrand who pays taxes for Teigen 1603. Last resident was Øystein Olsen Berekvam, born 1901.

=== Skori ===
No record.

=== Holmen ===
No record.

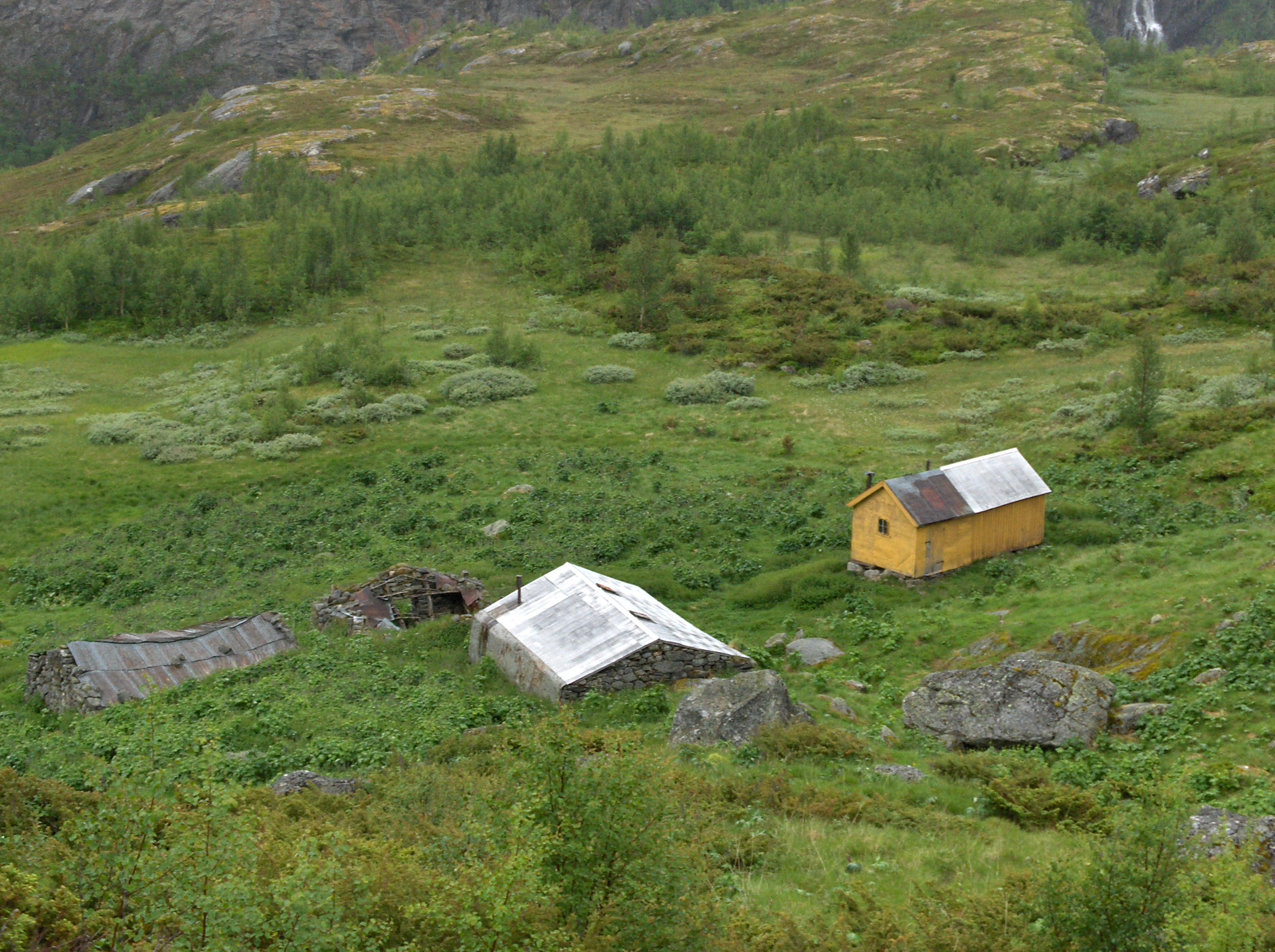
Holmen mountain farm, seen from the track over Bjødnastigen.

=== Nesbø ===
The earliest recorded farmer was Anders Nesbø, mentioned in documents from 1670. Last resident is Sivert Nesbø born in 1888 and emigrated to America in 1909.

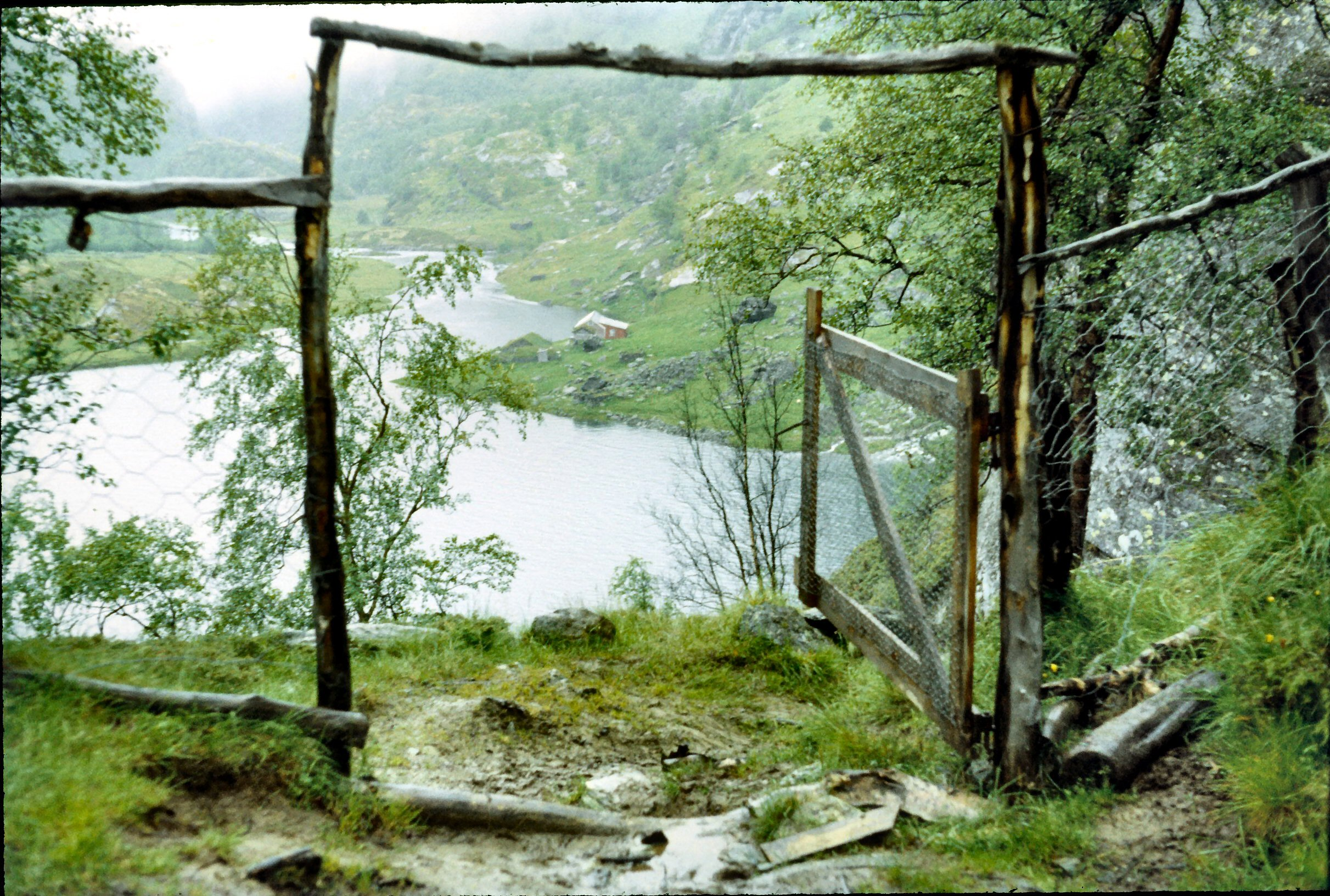
1961. Nesbø. Before 1930, the cattle drives had to take the path upwards Gravadalen to the left of the farm and pass over the mountain to Østerbø to avoid Nesbøgalden.

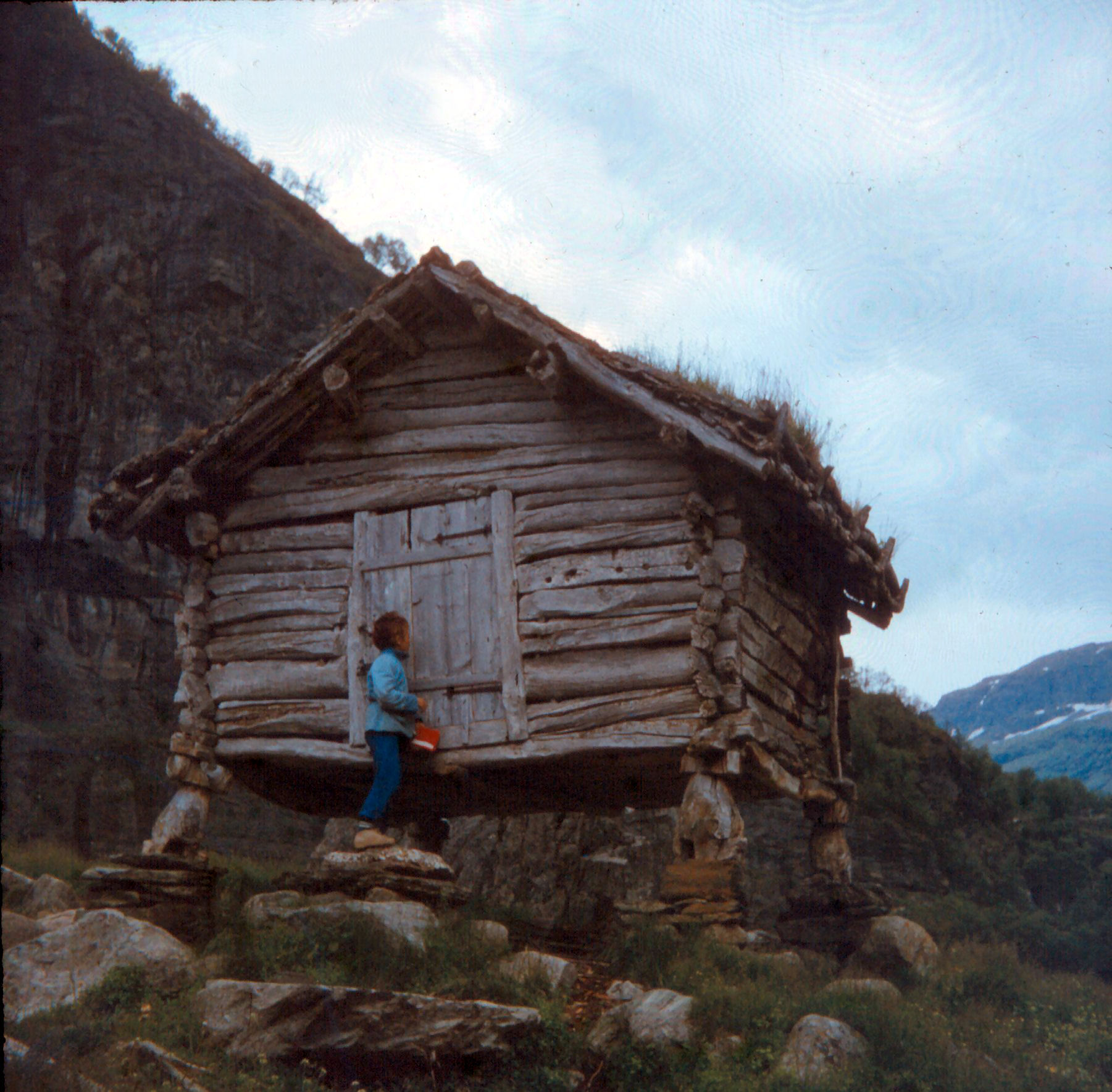
1960. The old storehouse on pillars at Nesbø.

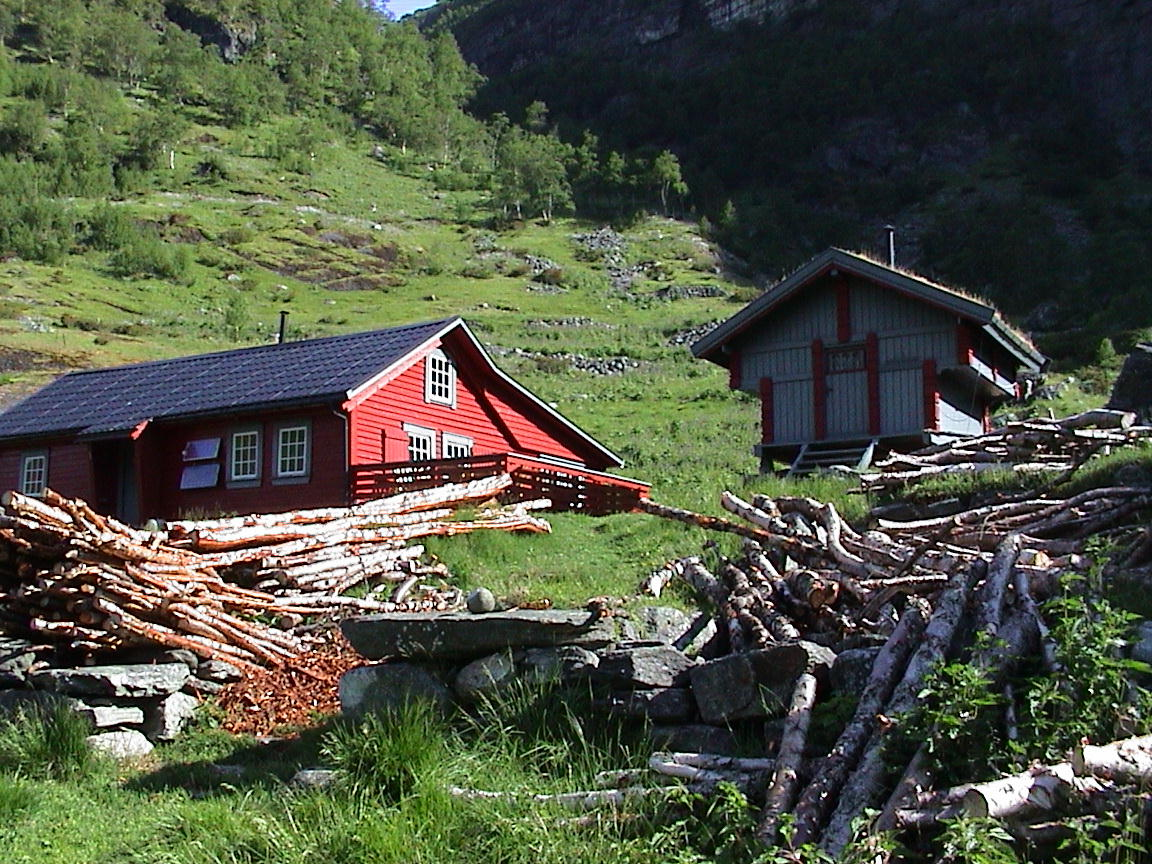
2001. Nesbø has been adapted to vacation use today.

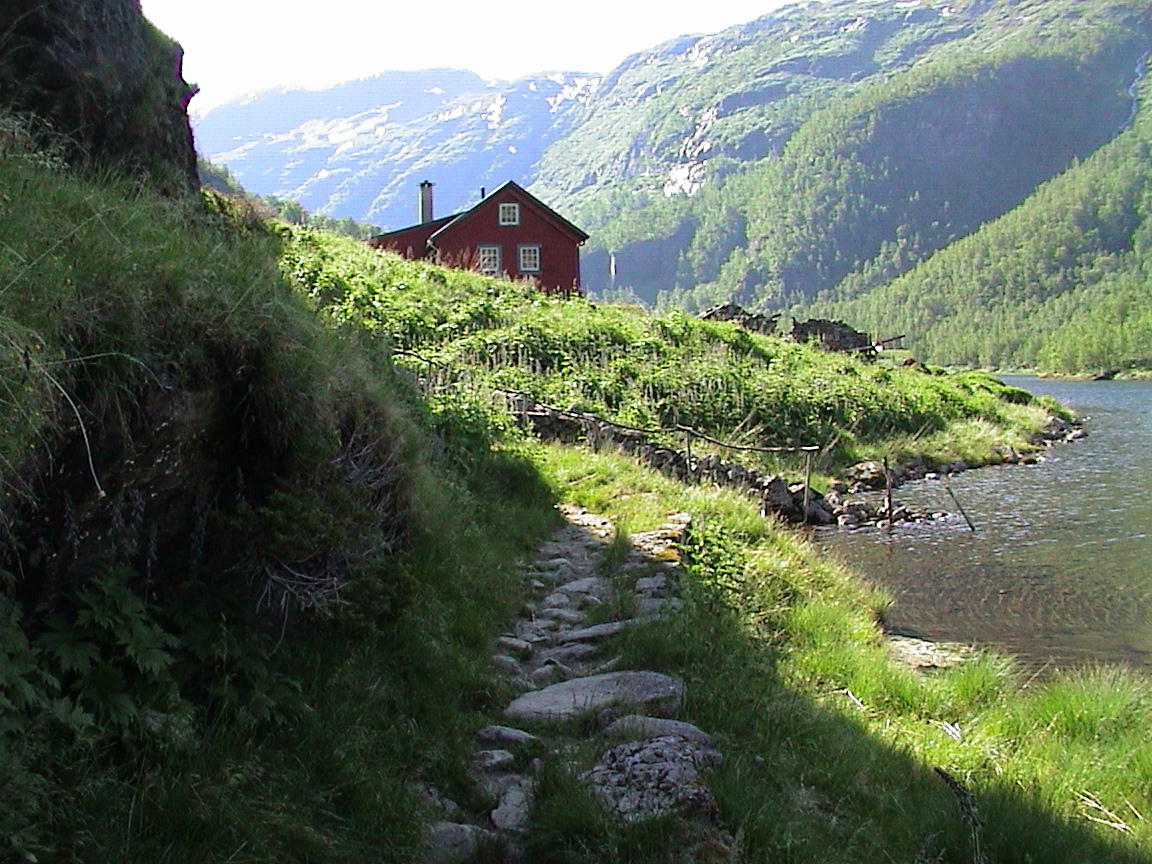
2001. Nesbø as it meets the eye when approaching from north.

=== Vikaneset ===
No record.

=== Urdviki (Aureviki) ===
The earliest recorded farmer was Elling, mentioned in documents from 1718. Last in Urdviki were the family of Sjur Eriksen Urdvik (Urevik) born 1813 - dead 1850.

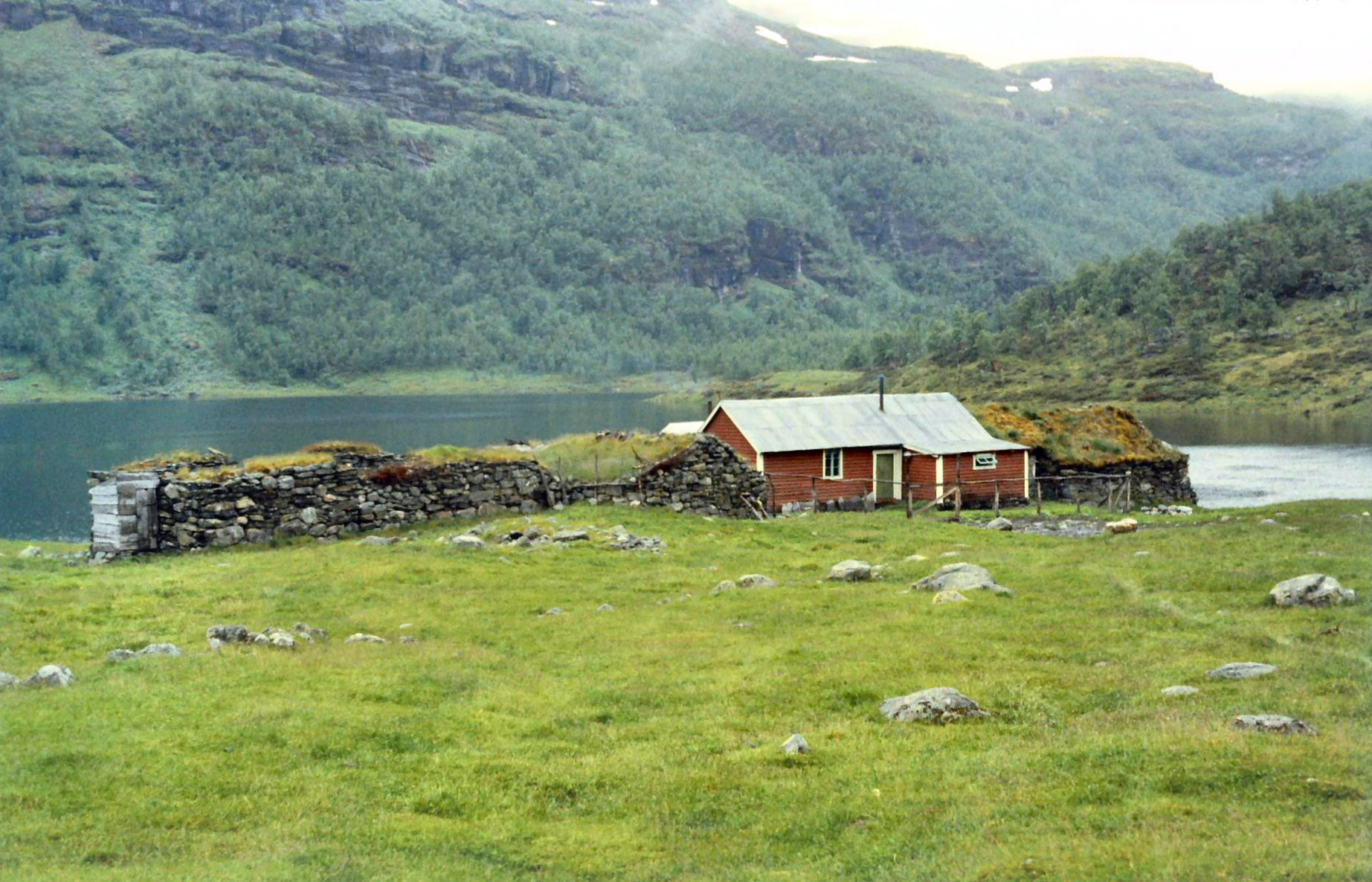
Urdviki 1961.

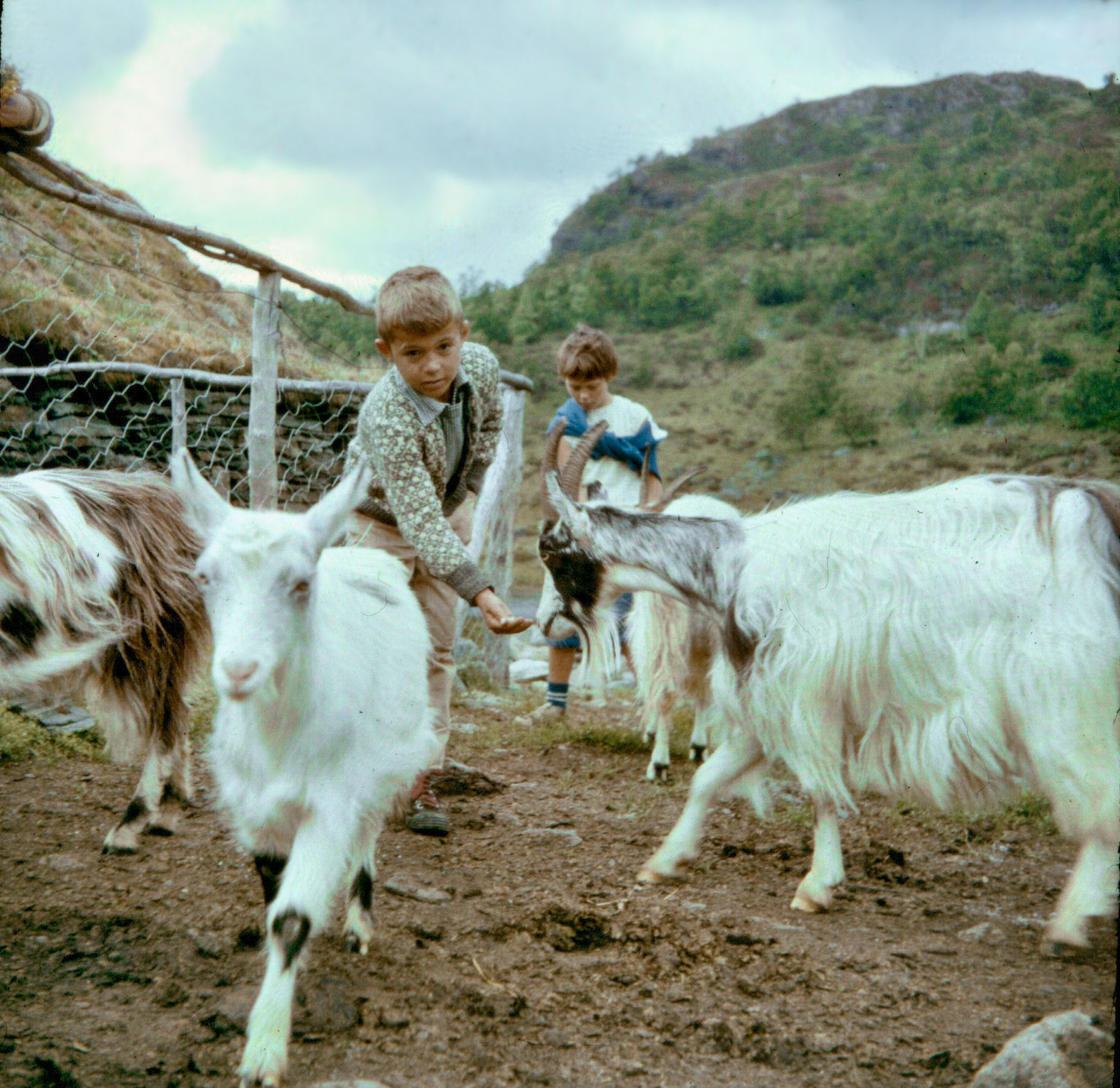
1960. Goats at Urdviki.

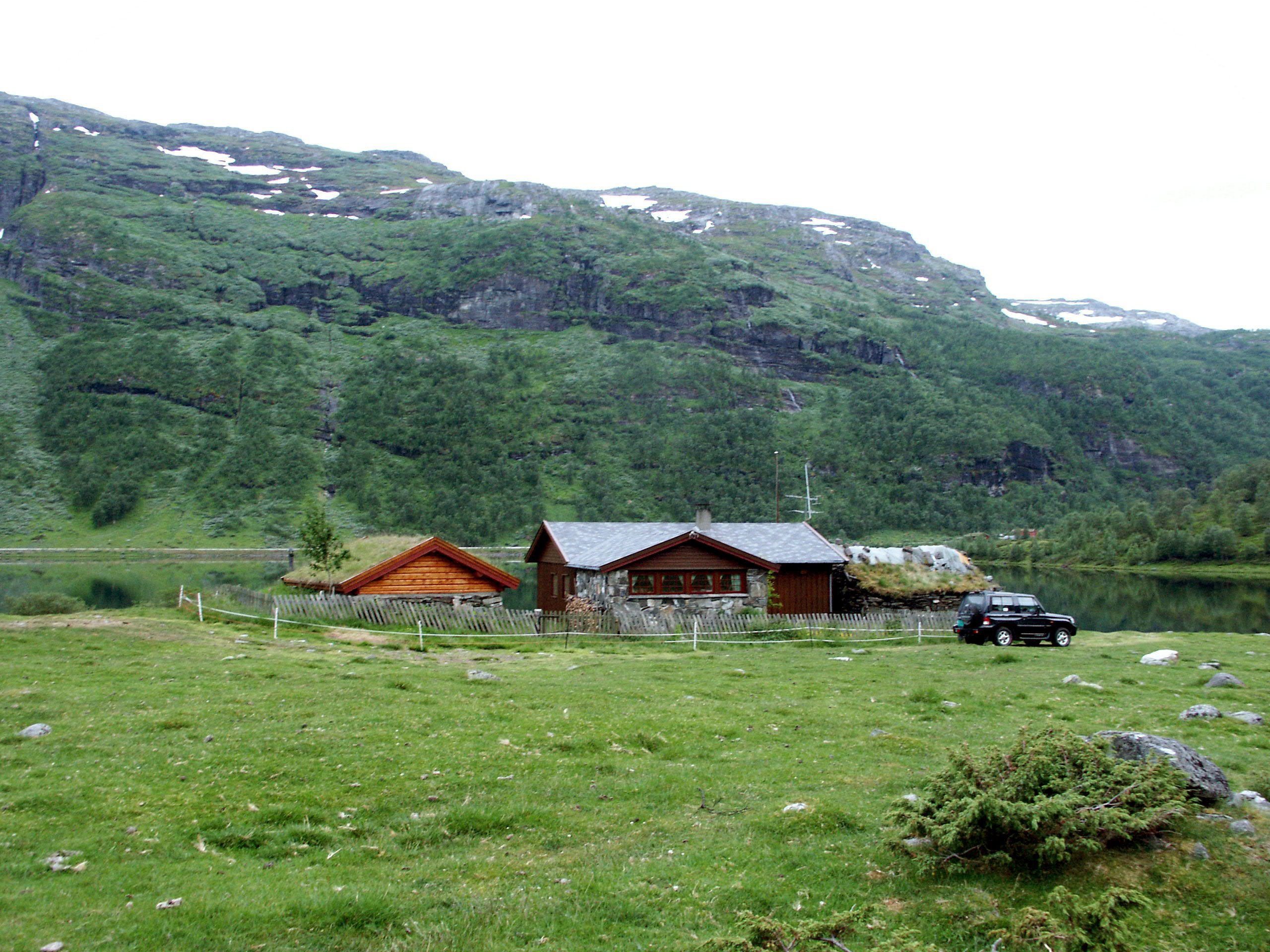
2001. After the residents in Urdviki moved out it was used as a ”støl” (dairy farm) for goats into the seventies. When the road was built to Østerbø, Urdviki was rebuilt as vacation cabin.

=== Øvstebø (Østerbø) ===
The earliest recorded farmer was Nils Urdal (Aurdal) who pays land taxes 1632. Dead 1638. Last resident at Østerbø is Knut Mikkelsen Østerbø, born 1846 - dead 1914.

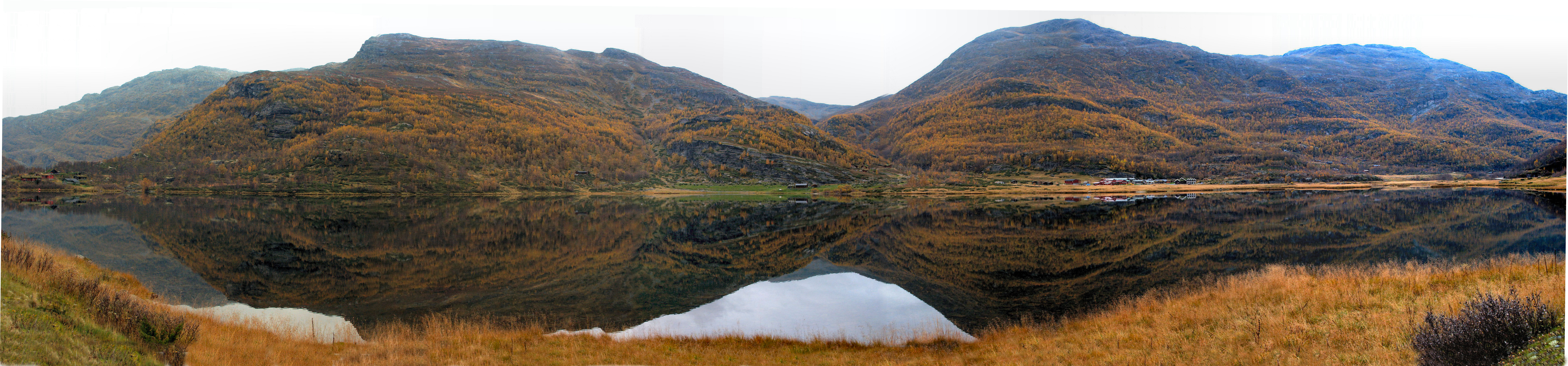
Østerbø in Aurdalen seen from the road RV288 across Aurdalsvatnet. Urdviki in the middle and Østerbø at the right.

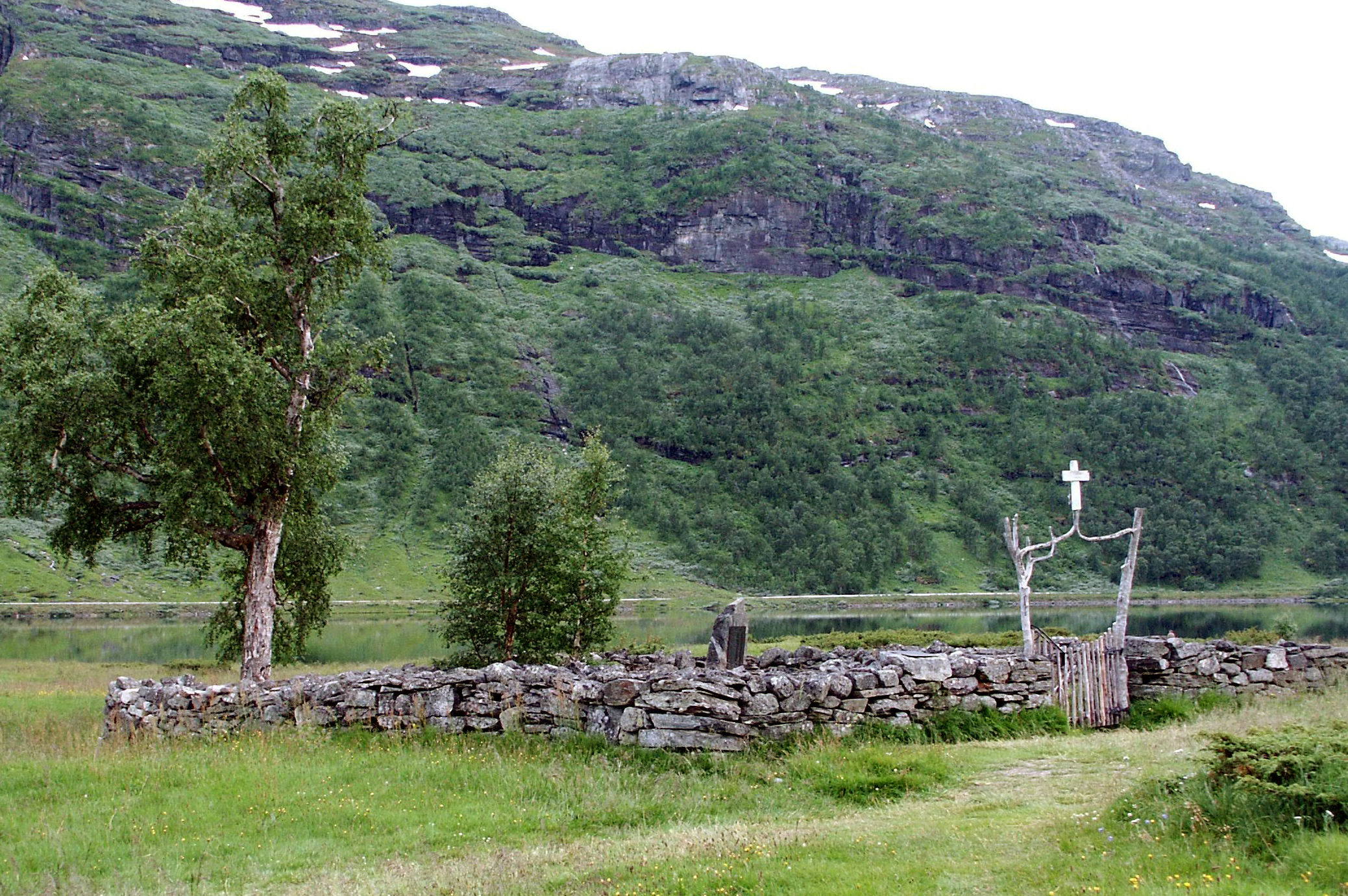
This cemetery was erected 1859 because it was impossible to bring the dead to the cemetery at Aurlandsvangen in the winter times. Here 27 people are buried. The dates indicate that the Spanish influenza also took its toll in remote places like Østerbø. Several of the names indicate roots in Ål and Hol in the Hallingdalen, confirming the cross-mountain travel.

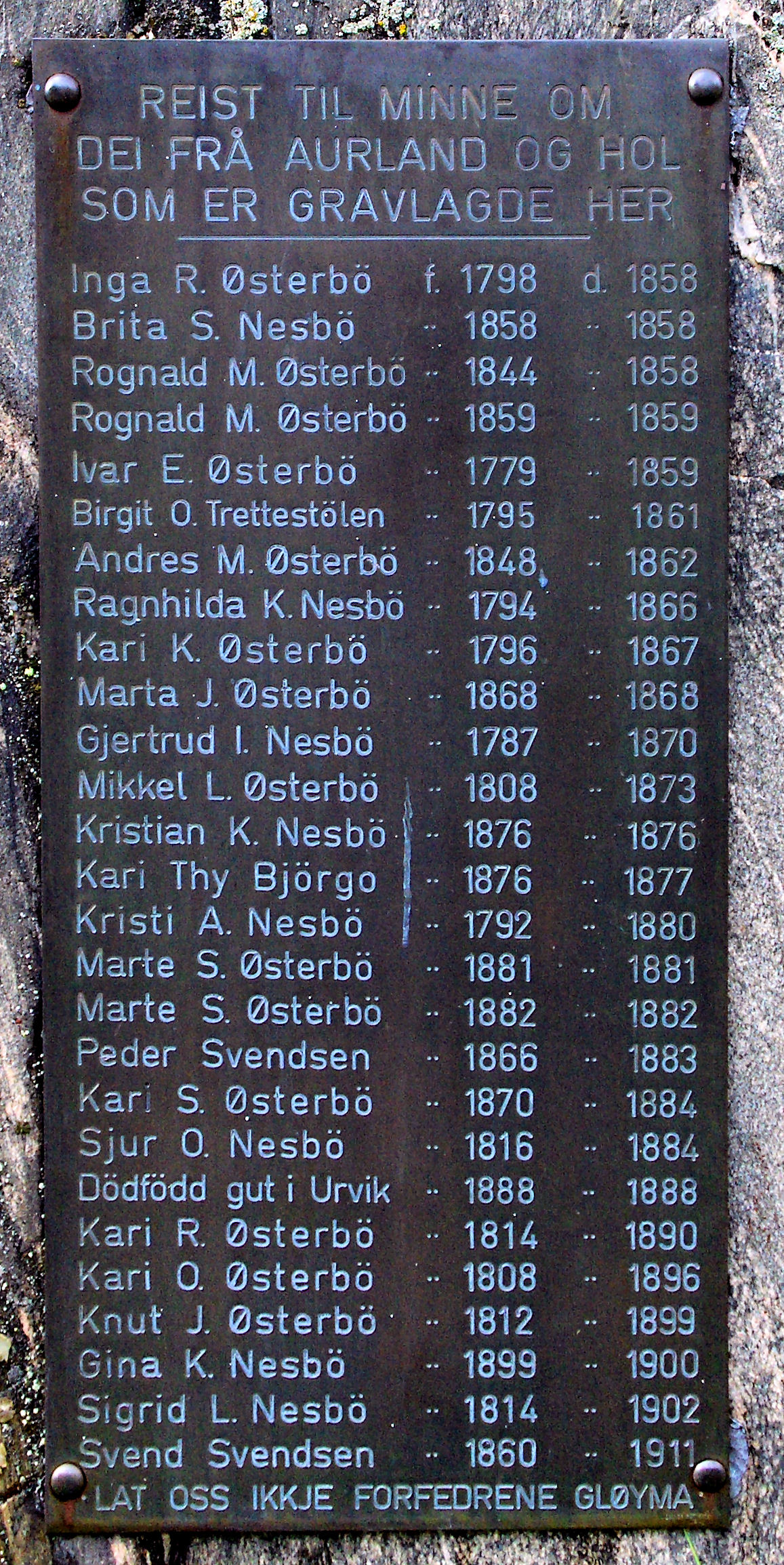
Memorial bronze plate.

== Population ==
The population in Aurland in 1845 was recorded as 2,811 individuals. Extensive emigration to America, deaths from the Spanish Influenza in 1918-1919 and emigration to the cities, especially in the twentieth century, resulted in a population decrease to 2,193 by 1960. As of 2004 the population had fallen further to 1803 individuals.

== Bibliography ==
- Bach, Tron; Gjerdåker, Johannes (1994). Aurlandsdalen: ei kulturhistorisk vandring frå fjell til fjære (in Norwegian). Oslo: Cappelen. ISBN 8202146755.
- Ohnstad, Anders (1964). Ættebok for Aurland - fram til omlag 1900 (in Norwegian). Vol. 2. Bergen: Aurland sogelag (Bergen boktrykk).
- Ohnstad, Anders (1964). Aurland bygdebok - fram til omlag 1920 (in Norwegian). Bergen: Aurland sogelag (Bergen boktrykk).
- Ohnstad, Anders (1990). Aurland bygdebok: fra 1835 til 1985 (in Norwegian). Aurland: Aurland sogelag. ISBN 8299226104.
- Den norske turistforenings årbok 1927 [Yearbook for The Norwegian Tourist Association] (in Norwegian). Grøndahl & søns boktrykkeri. 1927.
