= Midtre Folgefonna =

Glacier in Vestland, Norway

- Interactive map of Midtre Folgefonna
- Type: Plateau glacier
- Location: Vestland, Norway
- Coordinates: 60°09′N 06°29′E
- Area: 9 km^{2} (3.5 sq mi)

Midtre Folgefonna (lit. 'Central Folgefonna') is a glacier located in the Hardanger region of Vestland county, Norway. It is one of the three glaciers that make up the large Folgefonna glacier. It is located along the border of Ullensvang Municipality and Kvinnherad Municipality between the Nordre Folgefonna and Søndre Folgefonna glaciers on the Folgefonna peninsula. In 1969, the glacier was listed at 13 square kilometres (5.0 sq mi). In a book by glaciologist Olav Orheim from 2009 the area is listed as only 9 square kilometres (3.5 sq mi). The glacier drains partly to the Maurangerfjord to the west, and partly to the Sørfjorden to the east.

== See also ==
- List of glaciers in Norway
