= Hardangerfjord =

Fjord in Norway

Hardangerfjord Hardangerfjorden
- Hardanger Fjord
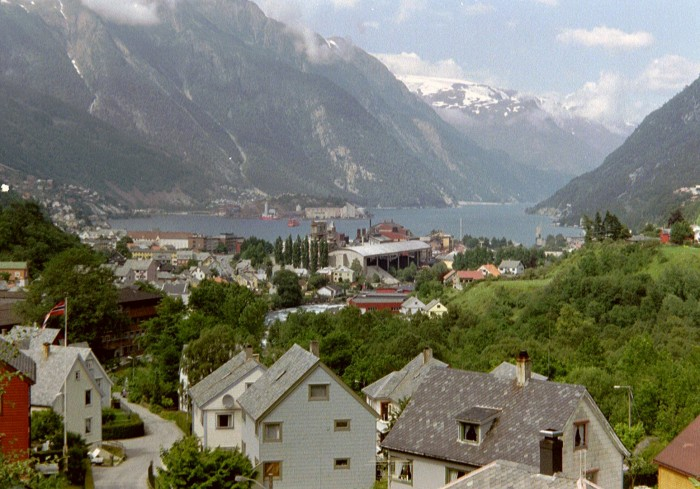
- View of the inner part of the fjord, seen from Odda

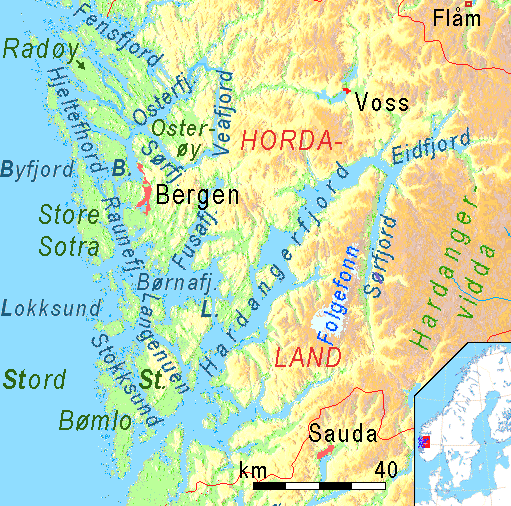
- Interactive map of Hardangerfjord; Hardangerfjorden
- Coordinates: 60°10′N 6°00′E
- Basin countries: Norway
- Max. length: 179 kilometres (111 mi)
- Max. width: 2 to 10 kilometres (1.2 to 6.2 mi)
- Max. depth: 860 metres (2,820 ft)
- Settlements: Odda, Leirvik

The Hardangerfjord (English: Hardanger Fjord) is the fifth longest fjord in the world and the second longest fjord in Norway. It is located in the Hardanger region of Vestland county in western Norway. The fjord stretches 180 kilometres (110 mi) from the Atlantic Ocean into the mountainous interior of Norway along the Hardangervidda plateau. The innermost point of the fjord reaches the town of Odda.

== Location ==
The Hardangerfjord starts at the Atlantic Ocean about 80 kilometres (50 mi) south of the city of Bergen. Here the fjord heads in a northeasterly direction between the island of Bømlo and the mainland. It passes by the larger islands of Stord, Tysnesøya, and Varaldsøy on the north/west side and the Folgefonna peninsula on the south/east side. Once it is surrounded by the mainland, it begins to branch off into smaller fjords that reach inwards towards the grand Hardangervidda mountain plateau. The longest branch of the Hardangerfjord is Sørfjorden, which cuts south about 50 kilometres (31 mi) from the main fjord. Its maximum depth is more than 860 metres (2,820 ft) just outside the village of Norheimsund in the middle of the fjord.

Norway's third largest glacier is found on the Folgefonna peninsula, adjacent to the Hardangerfjord. With its three parts, this glacier covers an area of 220 km^{2} (85 sq mi), and in 2005 it became protected as Folgefonna National Park.

The area of the fjord is divided among several municipalities in Vestland county: Bømlo, Eidfjord, Etne, Kvam, Kvinnherad, Stord, Sveio, Tysnes, Ullensvang, Ulvik, and Voss. The total number of inhabitants of all these municipalities along the fjord is only slightly more than 70,000 — on a total area of 8,471 square kilometres (3,271 sq mi).

== History ==
About 8000 BC, the Scandinavian land mass started to rise up as enormous quantities of glacial ice started to melt. The lower parts of the valleys were flooded, and so created what we today know as the Hardangerfjord. The valley was formed not only through glacial erosion but by the high pressure meltwater which pushed its way beneath the ice.

The history of the fjord goes far beyond its Viking history, back to the time of hunters on the surrounding mountains, and later on, farming along this fertile area which today is considered the "fruit orchard of Norway". Later the fjord gave birth to a large influx of tourism to Norway, and in 1875 Thomas Cook started weekly cruise departures from London to the Hardangerfjord, to view its spectacular nature, glaciers, and grand waterfalls. Soon after this, many of the major waterfalls became hydroelectric power sources for large industries in fjord settlements such as the town of Odda.

== Economy ==
Hardangerfjord has recently seen an increase in tourism. New infrastructure was built for travelers and the location has once again become an industry for the local communities along the fjord.

The fjord has good conditions for fish farming. Fish farms yearly produce more than 40,000 tons of salmon and rainbow trout which makes the Hardangerfjord one of four major fish farming regions in the world.

Hardangerfjord's melt-water is also bottled at source to form the product Isklar, sold worldwide.

== Geography ==
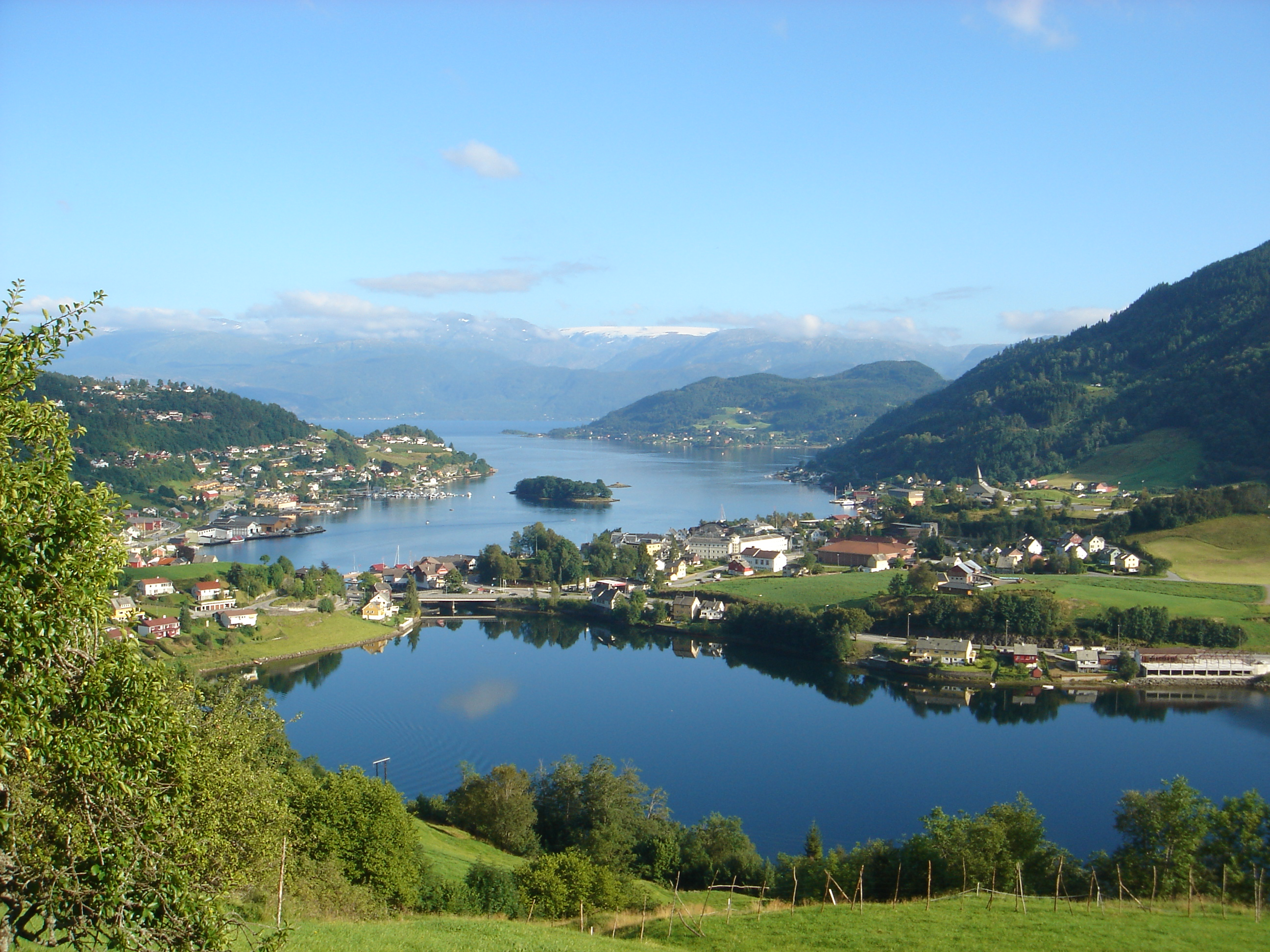
Hardangerfjord at Norheimsund

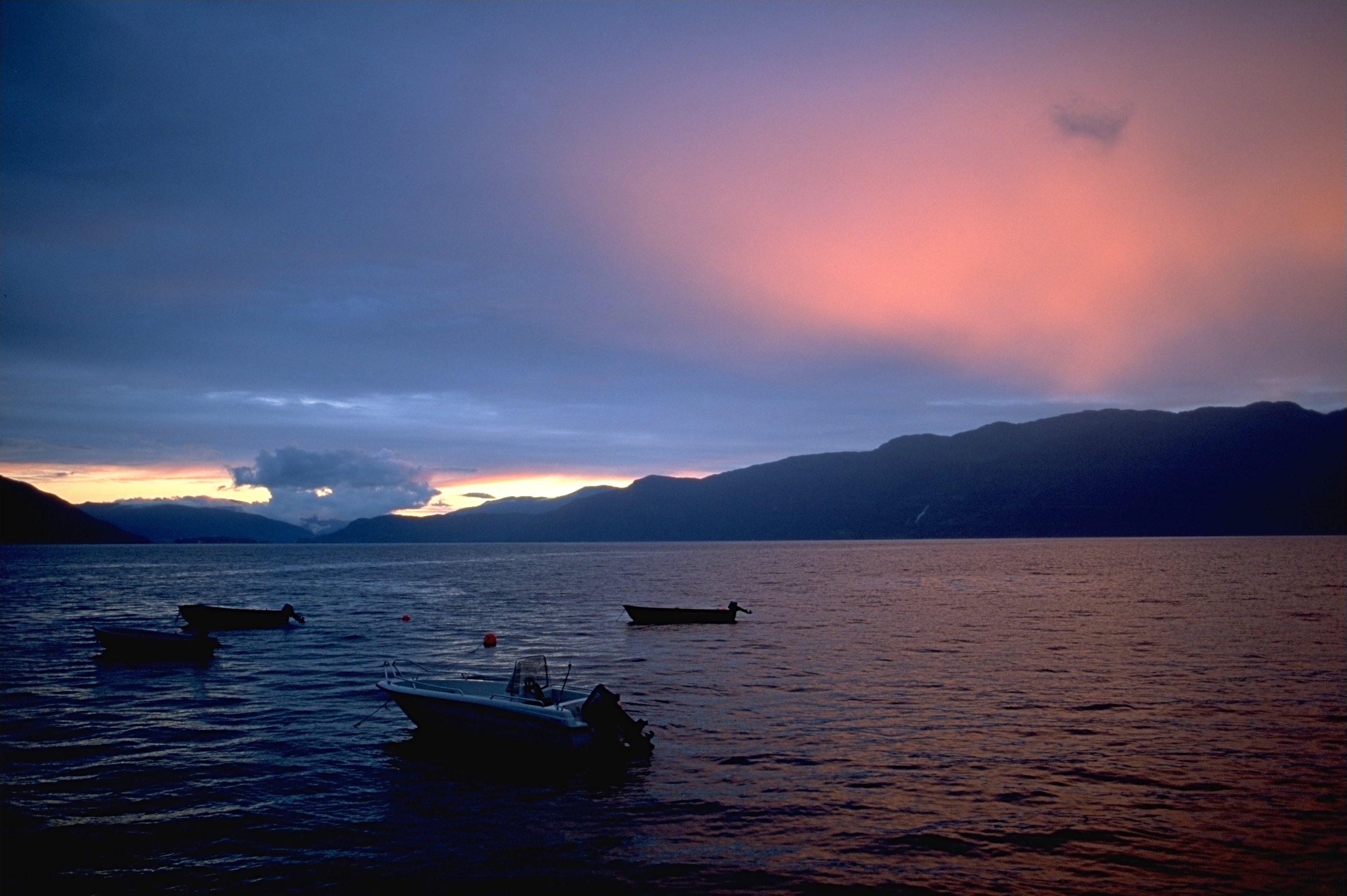
Hardangerfjord sunset

There are many fjord arms that branch off of the main Hardangerfjord. There are also certain sections of the main fjord that have special names. Below is a list of the sections of the fjord and the arms that branch off them. From west to east:

Bømlafjorden (west entrance to the fjord)

- Børøyfjorden (branches to the north)
- Stokksundet (branches to the north)
- Bjøafjorden (branches to the south)

Husnesfjorden (around the Husnes area)
Onarheimsfjorden (around the Onarheim area)

- Lukksundet (branches to the north)

Kvinnheradsfjorden (around the Rosendal area)

- Øynefjorden (branches to the north)

Sildefjorden (around the island of Varaldsøy)

- Maurangsfjorden (branches to the east)

Hissfjorden (around the Kysnesstranda area)

- Strandebarmsbukta (bay to the north)

Ytre Samlafjorden (around the Norheimsund area)

- Fyksesundet (branches to the north)

Indre Samlafjorden (around the Ålvik area)
Utnefjorden (around the Utne area)

- Granvin Fjord (branches to the north)
- Sørfjorden (branches to the south)

Eidfjorden (around the Eidfjord area)

- Osa Fjord (branches to the north)
  - Ulvikafjorden (branches off the Osa Fjord to the northwest)
- Simadal Fjord (branches to the northeast)

== See also ==
- List of Norwegian fjords
