= Leif Einar Lothe =

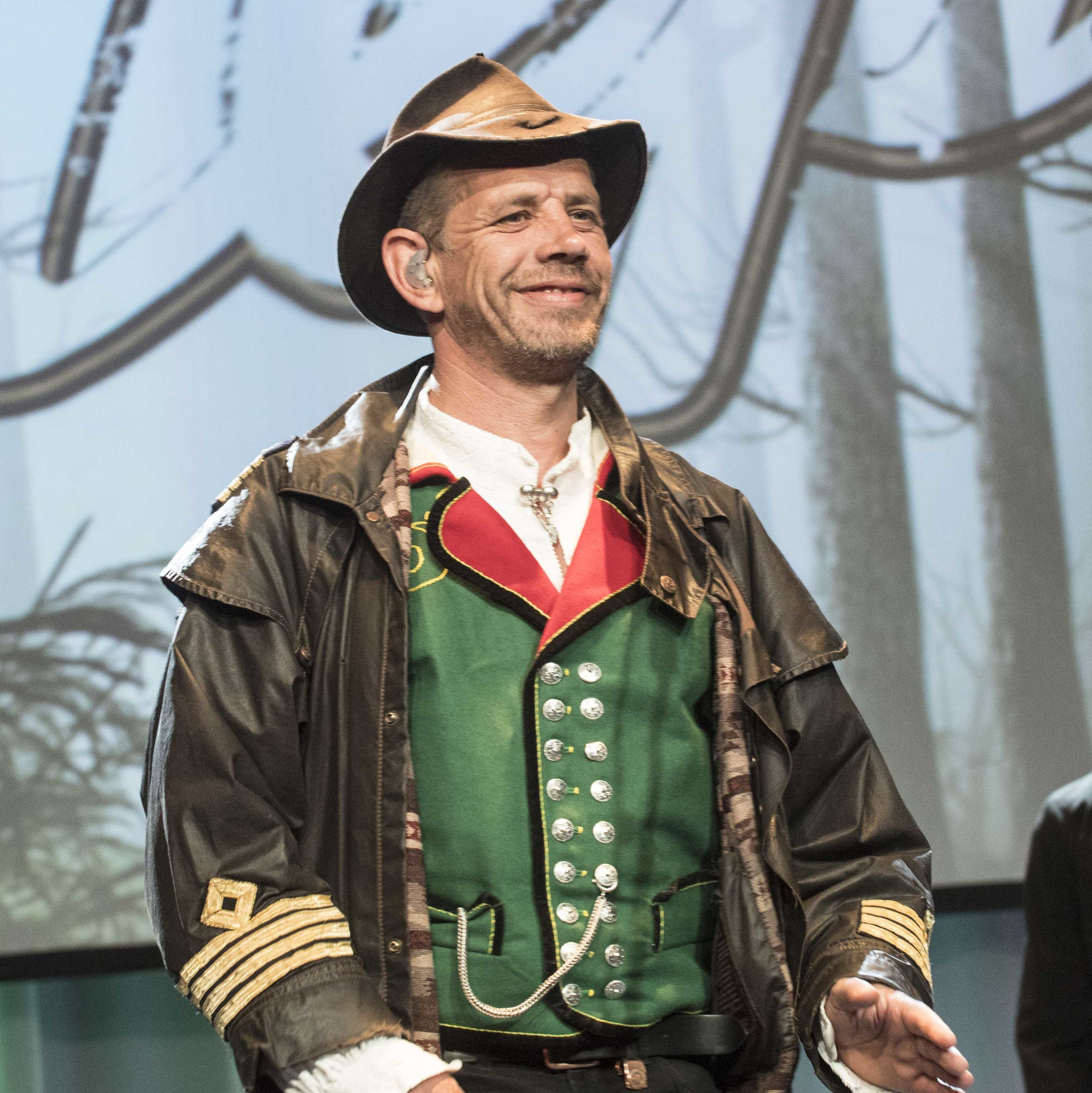
- Born: 30 September 1969 (age 56); Odda, Norway
- Other names: Lothepus
- Occupations: Entrepreneur, musician, TV personality
- Years active: 2009-present
- Known for: "Fjorden Cowboys" "Farmen kjendis 2017"

Leif Einar Lothe (born 30 September 1969), better known by his stage name, Lothepus, is a Norwegian television personality, entrepreneur and musician, best known for his starring role in the documentary series Fjorden Cowboys.

== Biography ==
Lothe was born and raised along the Sørfjorden, near Odda, an industrial town in the Hardanger region of Norway. Lothe is a trained shotfirer and explosives expert and has owned and run his own entrepreneur firm since the early 1990s. His nickname, "Lothepus", allegedly comes from a visitor who misheard his surname, and it stuck with him.

=== Music career ===
Lothe released his first album, "Sallaren", in 2009. After Lothe became famous through Fjorden Cowboys, the album quickly sold out, and he received requests from fans to produce more copies. While filming the first series he recorded the album Cowboyhjarta, released in 2014, and two years later recorded a Christmas album entitled Julatre.

=== Television career ===
==== Fjorden Cowboys ====
For many years considered a local hero and celebrity in Hardanger, Lothe was approached by TV 2 who wanted to make a documentary series about him and his colleague Joar Førde. Two years of filming eventually resulted in the ten-episode series "Fjorden Cowboys", aired in 2014. The series became an instant hit with audiences, who enjoyed the comical, uncensored and raw personas - soon becoming the most watched television program on TV 2 Zebra that year. Following the success two more seasons totalling 22 episodes and one special episode were ordered and filmed in 2014-15. In March 2016 the show was renewed for a fourth and fifth series to air in 2017 and 2018.

==== Farmen ====
Due to his increasing popularity, Lothe was one of the names suggested for the first celebrity edition of "Farmen", a Norwegian reality series where contestants have to live and work at a 19th-century farm using only the technology, food and lifestyle available at the time. Quickly becoming a fan favorite, he eventually defeated Ida-Gran Jensen in the final duel to become the inaugural winner of the series.

== Personal life ==
Lothe currently resides in Odda with his partner, Randi. He has three children, Stian, Ida, and Vetle, from a previous relationship.
