= Vikebygd, Ullensvang =

Village in Ullensvang Municipality, Norway

Vikebygd
- Village
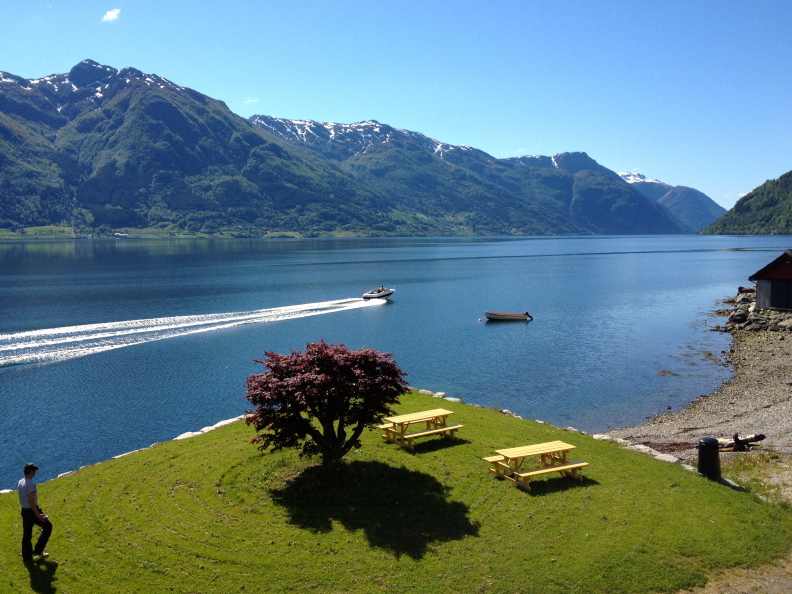
- View of a small park in Nå, looking across the fjord
- Interactive map of Vikebygd
- Coordinates: 60.26066°N 6.5743°E
- Country: Norway
- Region: Western Norway
- County: Vestland
- District: Hardanger
- Municipality: Ullensvang Municipality
- Elevation: 9 m (30 ft)
- Time zone: UTC+01:00 (CET)
  - Summer (DST): UTC+02:00 (CEST)
- Post Code: 5776 Nå

Vikebygd is a village area in Ullensvang Municipality in Vestland county, Norway. The village area is actually made up of the conurbation of the smaller villages of Bleie and Nå. The village area lies on the western shore of the Sørfjorden, across from the village of Sekse. The village is built on the steep mountainsides that line the sides of the fjord. The Folgefonna National Park and the Folgefonna glacier both lie just to the southwest of the village. The village area is dominated by fruit farms and orchards.

The Bleietunet museum is a working farm/orchard that is part of the Vikebygd Park. Tourists can learn the history of the area, take guided tours, as well as try fresh fruit and locally made hard apple cider and apple juice.
