= Fjorden Cowboys =

- Genre: Documentary, Comedy
- Starring: Leif Einar Lothe; Joar Førde
- Country of origin: Norway
- Original language: Norwegian
- No. of seasons: 7
- No. of episodes: 60 (list of episodes)

Production
- Production locations: Multiple locations, primarily in Odda and Hardanger, Norway
- Running time: 30 minutes

Original release
- Network: TV2 Zebra
- Release: 5 February 2014

Fjorden Cowboys is a Norwegian comedy-documentary series created by Hildegunn Wærness, first aired on TV2 in 2014. The series focus on entrepreneur Leif Einar Lothe and his colleague Joar Førde as they make a living as shotfirers and spend their time drinking beer and enjoying life. Highly popular when released, four series have been made, with a fifth series being filmed.

== Concept ==
The show is a comic documentary-style reality series that follows entrepreneur Leif Einar Lothe and his colleague Joar Førde, chronicling their work and private life and the many situations they arrive in, such as retrieving a stolen boat, accidentally destroying a garden while removing an old truck, or creating home-made fireworks.

== Production ==
Production for the first series began in 2011, when series creator Hildegunn Wærness approached her cousin Joar Førde and Lothe to make a documentary series, based on an idea she got in 2004. Recording for the first ten episodes took more than two years, with more than 400 hours of footage being filmed. The show is filmed using mainly handheld cameras, with Lothe and Førde narrating some of the action to make sure the viewers know whats going on. The series became an instant hit with audiences, who enjoyed the comical, uncensored and raw personas - soon becoming the most watched television program on TV2 Zebra that year. Following the success two more seasons totaling 22 episodes were ordered and filmed in 2014 and -15. In March 2016 the show was renewed for a fourth and fifth series to air in 2017 and -18. A special four-episode mini-series was filmed in 2016 and aired in November 2016.

== Reception ==
The first series received mixed reviews, with critics praising the natural and enjoyable nature of the show, but criticizing what many referred to as "justification of lawbreaking and lude behavior", and some critics suggesting it could be harmful for younger viewers to watch. Reviews for the later series were more positive.
