= Eitrheim =

Village in Ullensvang Municipality, Norway

- Village
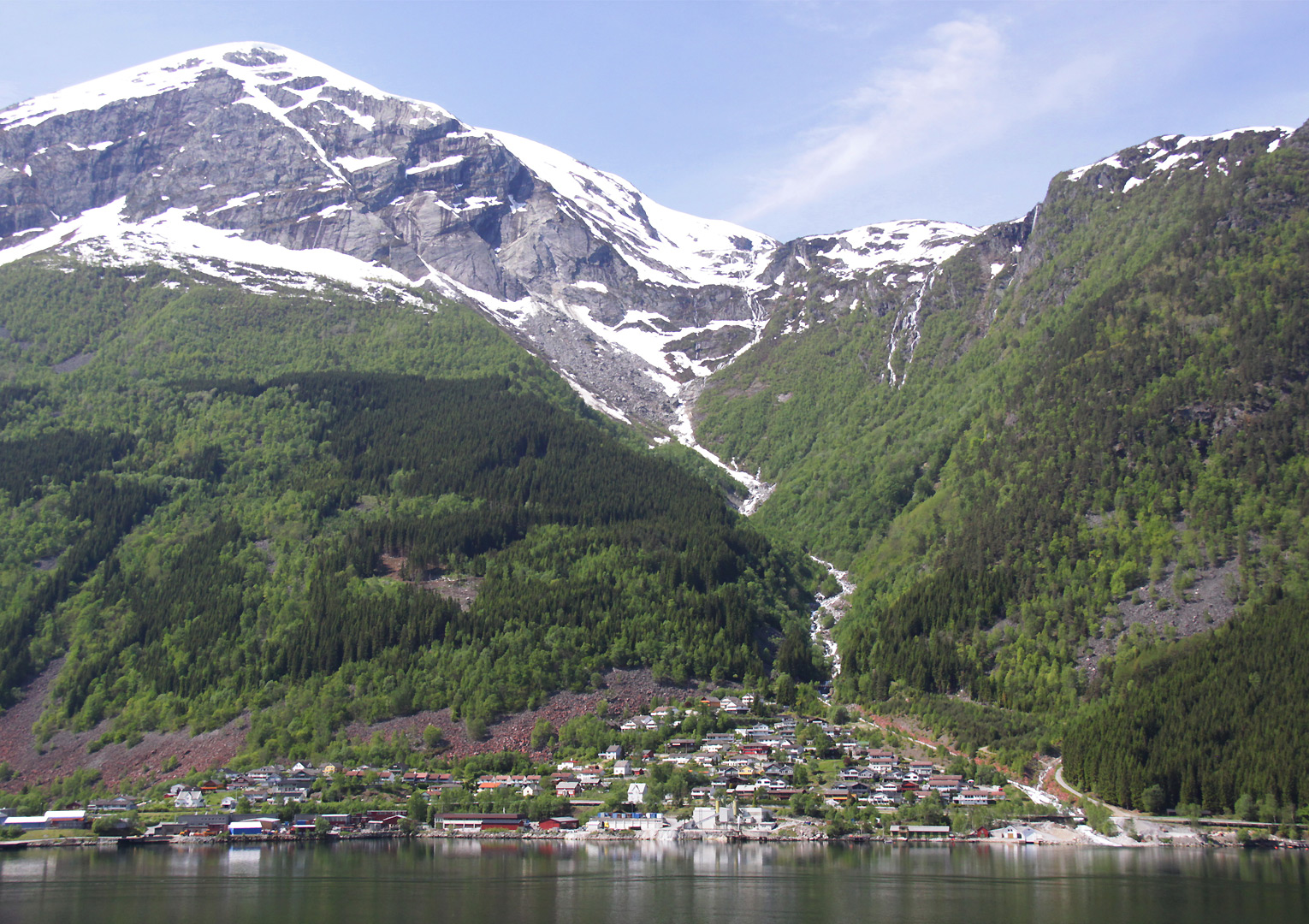
- View of the village
- Interactive map of Eitrheim
- Coordinates: 60.09864°N 6.52802°E
- Country: Norway
- Region: Western Norway
- County: Vestland
- District: Hardanger
- Municipality: Ullensvang Municipality
- Elevation: 23 m (75 ft)
- Time zone: UTC+01:00 (CET)
  - Summer (DST): UTC+02:00 (CEST)
- Post Code: 5750 Odda

Eitrheim is a village in Ullensvang Municipality in Vestland county, Norway. The industrial village is located on a small peninsula near the southern shore of the Sørfjorden, just 3 kilometres (1.9 mi) to the north of the town of Odda. The eastern end of the Folgefonna Tunnel lies on the western edge of Eitrheim.

The 0.88-square-kilometre (220-acre) village had a population (2002) of 856 and a population density of 973 inhabitants per square kilometre (2,520/sq mi). Since 2002, the population and area data for this village area has not been separately tracked by Statistics Norway, because it has been considered part of the urban area of the town of Odda.
