= Nordre Folgefonna =

Glacier in Vestland, Norway

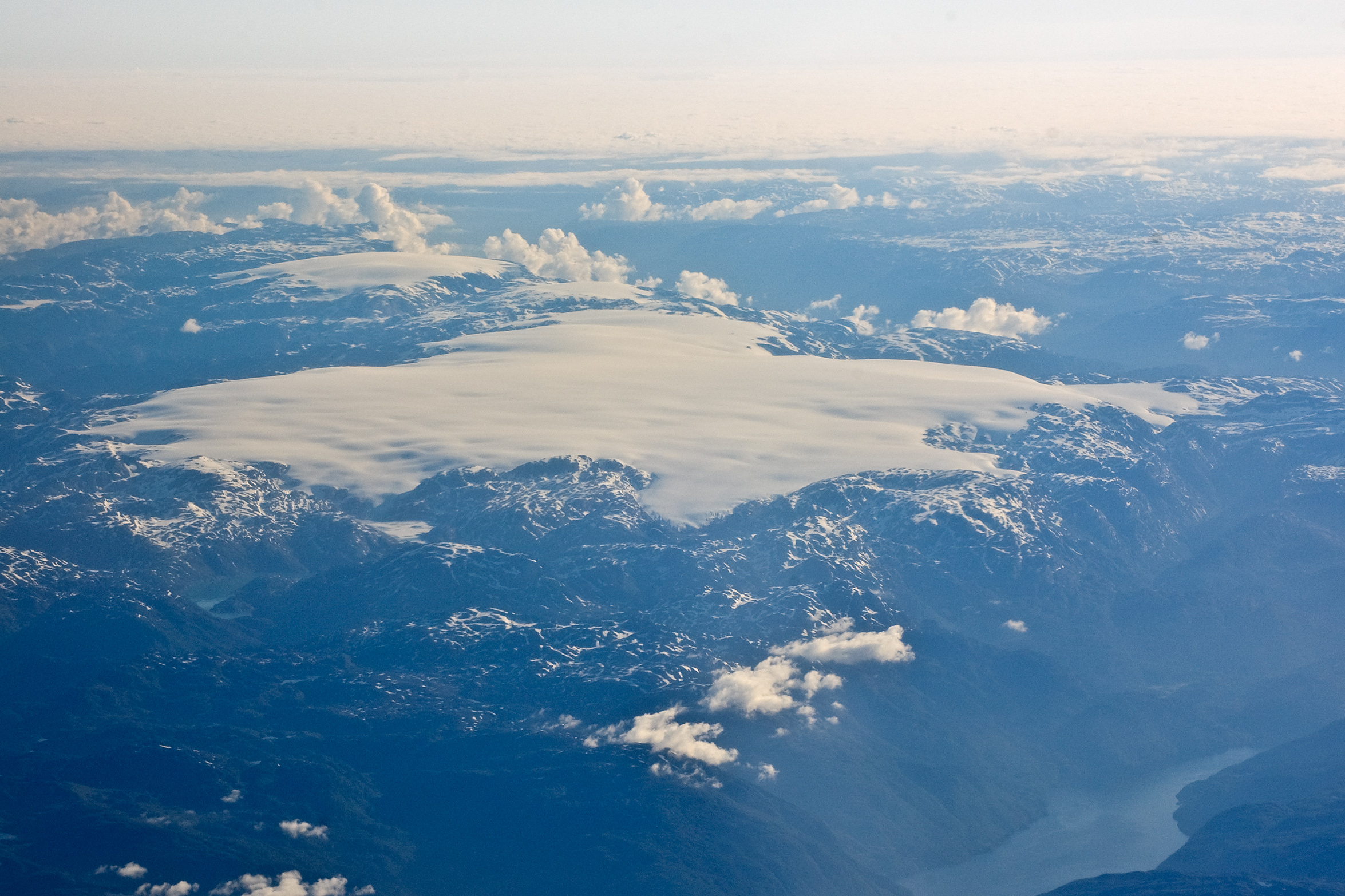
- Folgefonna seen from the air
- Interactive map of Nordre Folgefonna
- Location: Vestland, Norway
- Coordinates: 60°12′N 06°27′E
- Area: 26 km^{2} (10 sq mi)
- Highest elevation: 1,640 metres (5,380 ft)
- Lowest elevation: 990 metres (3,250 ft)

Nordre Folgefonna (lit. 'Northern Folgefonna') is one of the largest glaciers in mainland Norway. It is the northernmost of the three glaciers that make up Folgefonna. The glacier is located on the Folgefonna peninsula in the Hardanger and Sunnhordland regions of Vestland county. The 26-square-kilometre (10 sq mi) glacier lies along the borders of Kvinnherad Municipality and Ullensvang Municipality. Its highest point is 1,640 m (5,381 ft) above sea level, and its lowest point is 990 m (3,248 ft) above sea level. The glacier lies almost entirely inside Folgefonna National Park.

== See also ==
- List of glaciers in Norway
