= Buarbreen =

Glacier in Vestland, Norway

- Buerbreen (unofficial)
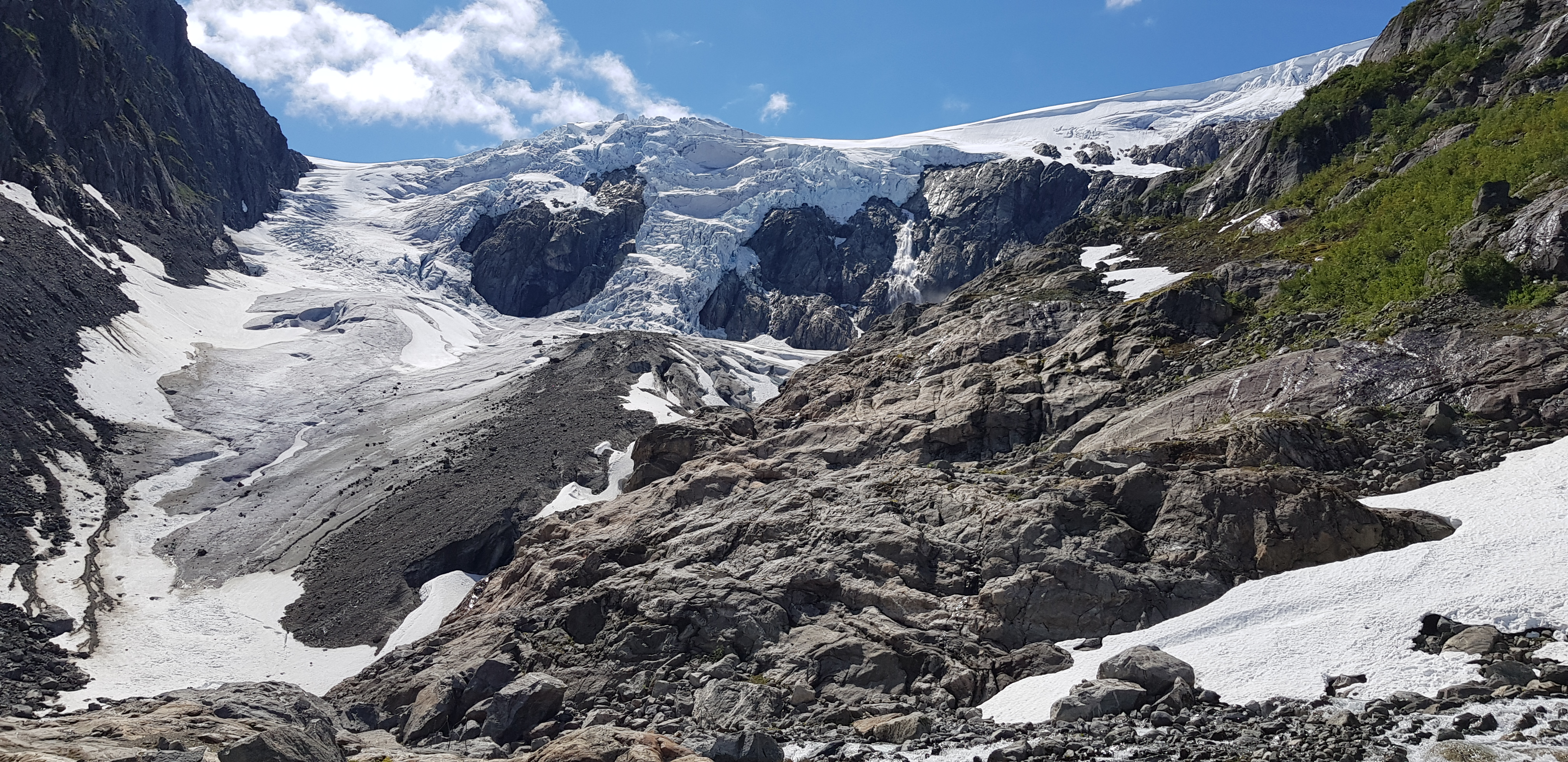
- Interactive map of Buarbreen
- Location: Vestland, Norway
- Coordinates: 60°02′37″N 06°25′42″E

Buarbreen is a glacier in Ullensvang Municipality in Vestland county, Norway. It is an offshoot of the large Folgefonna glacier. The small glacial arm reaches down into the Buardalen valley, just 6 kilometres (3.7 mi) southwest of the town of Odda. The glacier is split into two parts, one on either side of a small mountain peak. Both sides drain into the Jordalselvi river which flows out through the valley into the lake Sandvinvatnet.

== See also ==
- List of glaciers in Norway
