= Sandvinvatnet =

Lake in Vestland, Norway

- Sandvevatnet
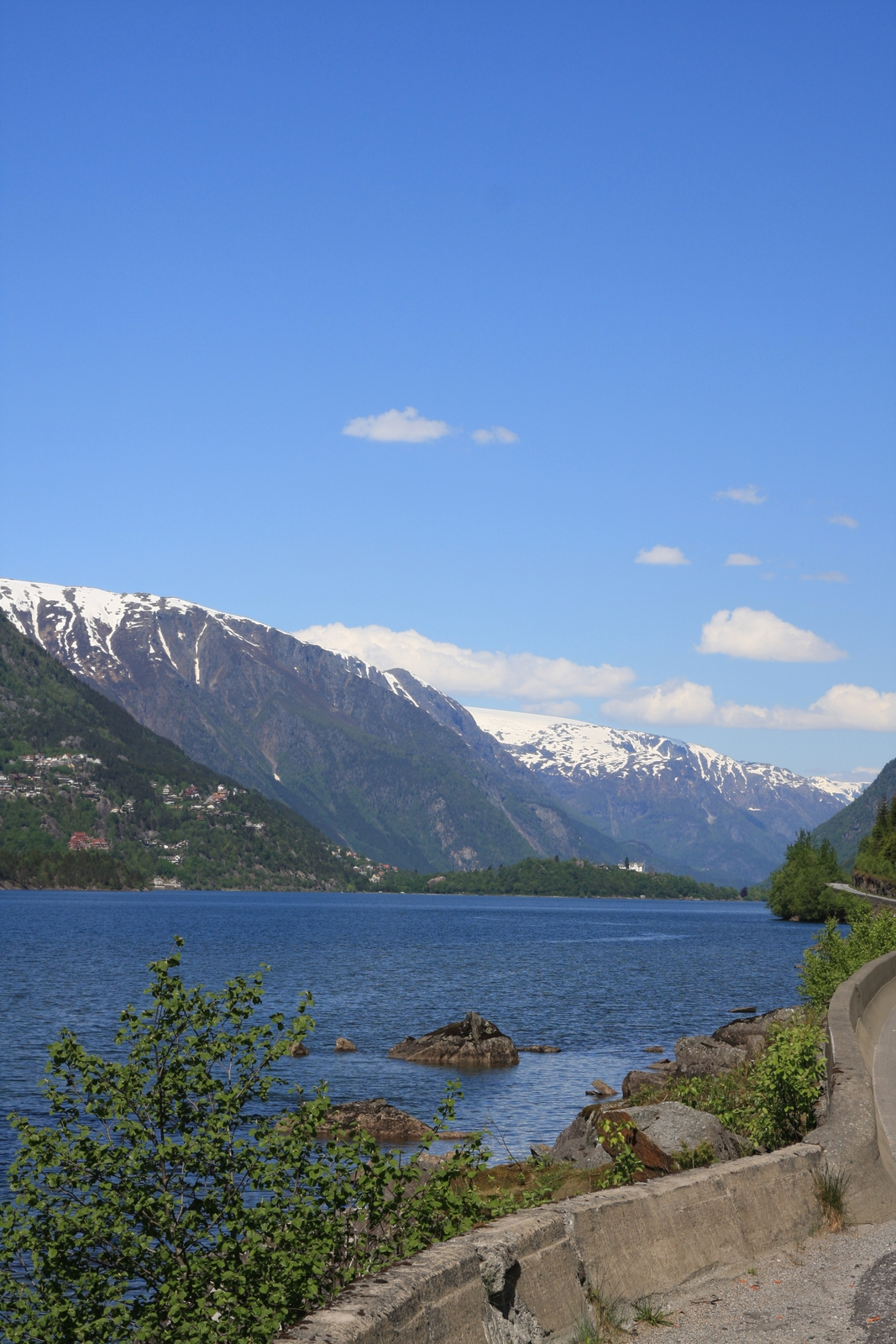
- View of the lake
- Interactive map of Sandvinvatnet
- Location: Ullensvang Municipality, Vestland
- Coordinates: 60.0416°N 6.5411°E
- Primary inflows: Storelvi river
- Primary outflows: Opo river
- Basin countries: Norway
- Max. length: 4.8 kilometres (3.0 mi)
- Max. width: 1.5 kilometres (0.93 mi)
- Surface area: 4.36 km^{2} (1.68 sq mi)
- Max. depth: 120 metres (390 ft)
- Shore length^{1}: 11.9 kilometres (7.4 mi)
- Surface elevation: 88 metres (289 ft)
- Settlements: Odda
- References: NVE
- ^{1} Shore length is not a well-defined measure.

Sandvinvatnet is a lake in Ullensvang Municipality in Vestland county, Norway. The 4.3-square-kilometre (1.7 sq mi) lake lies on the southern edge of the town of Odda. The Buardalen valley and Buarbreen glacier lie to the west of the lake. The Norwegian National Road 13 runs along the east side of the lake. The lake water flows north into the short river Opo, before entering the Sørfjorden.

== See also ==
- List of lakes in Norway
