= Isklar =

Brand of mineral water from Norway

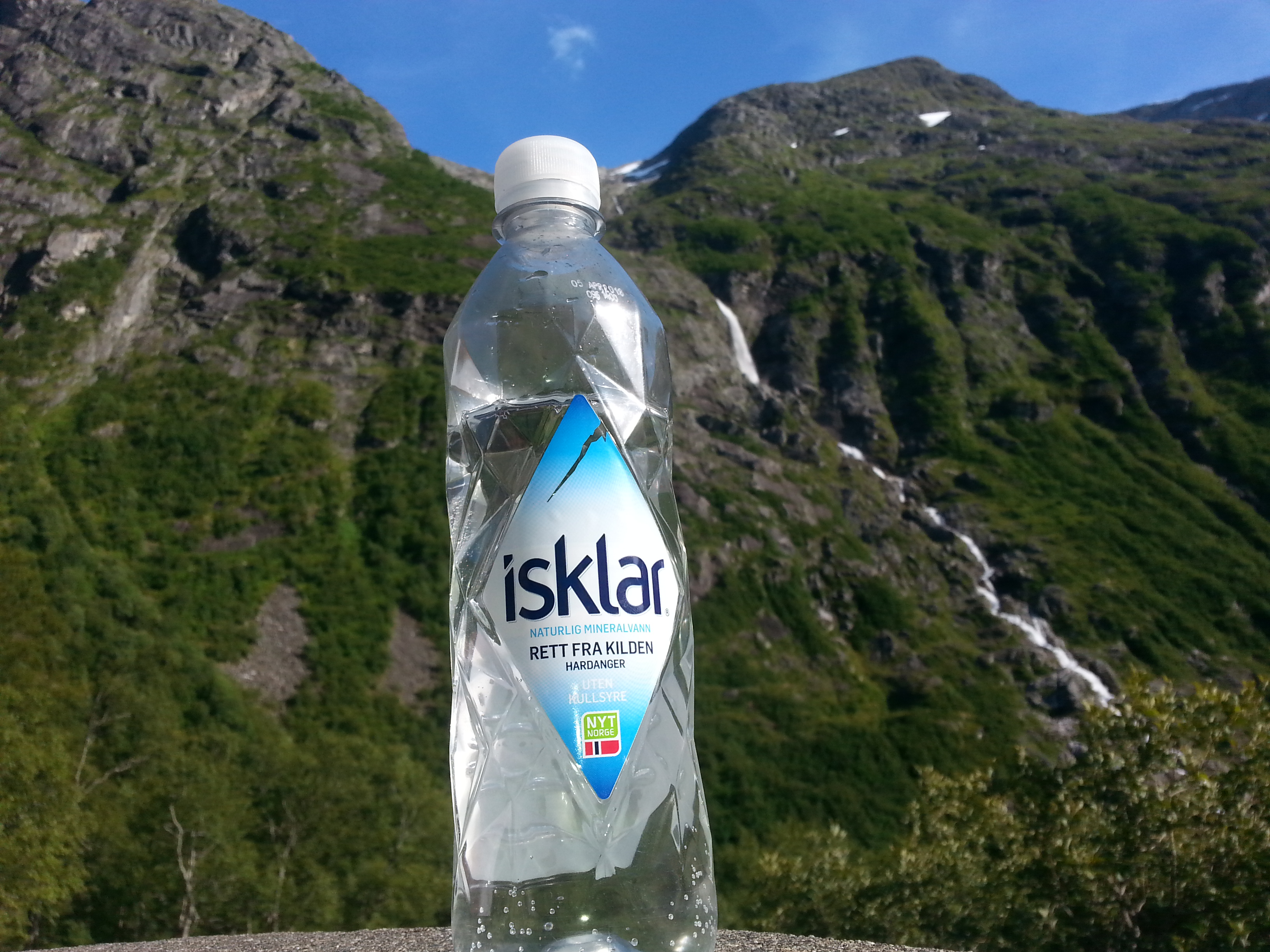
- Country: Norway
- Introduced: 2008; 18 years ago
- Source: Folgefonna glacier, Hardanger
- Type: Still
- Calcium (Ca): 6.4
- Chloride (Cl): 1.5
- Bicarbonate (HCO_{3}): 17.2
- Nitrate (NO_{3}): 0.3
- Potassium (K): 2.1
- Silica (SiO_{2}): 1.2
- Sodium (Na): 1.2
- Sulfate (SO_{4}): 8.8
- Website: http://www.isklar.no
- All concentrations in milligrams per liter (mg/L); pH without units

Isklar (Norwegian: [ˈɪ̂sːklɑːr]; "ice clear" in Norwegian) is a brand of still and sparkling natural mineral water from the Folgefonna Glacier of Norway. It was first launched in the United Kingdom in early 2008 but has since been discontinued. The company was backed by a global conglomerate, the Indian-based Siva Group, SABCO, and Jova holdings.

== The company ==
Isklar is based in the Hardanger region of Norway. The source for Isklar water is the Folgefonna glacier. The bottling plant is located in Ullensvang Municipality in Vestland county.

== Awards ==
Isklar water comes in a bottle which features a distinctive pattern, inspired by the glacier from which the water derives. This bottle design by bluemarlin Brand Design has won many awards including the following:

2008 Water Innovation awards:

- Best Overall Concept (Grand Prix)
- Best newcomer (silver award)
- Best environmental initiative (silver award)
- For special contribution to water innovation

2009 Pentawards

- Gold award

2009 Gramia Awards

- Diamond Winner

2009 UK packaging awards:

- Gold Award
