= Folgefonna National Park =

National park in Norway

- IUCN category II (national park)

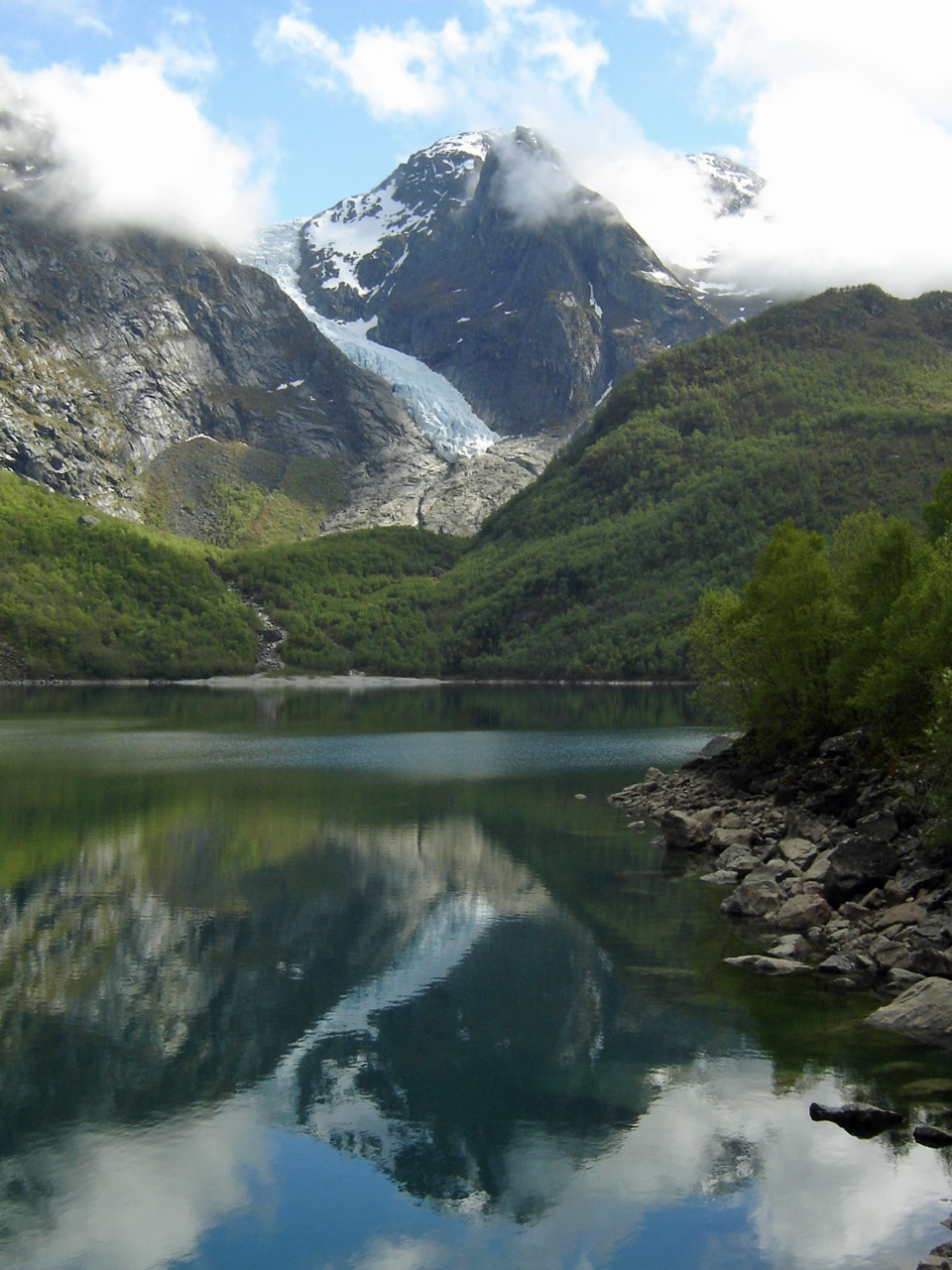
- Bondhusbrea
- Interactive map of Folgefonna National Park
- Location: Vestland, Norway
- Nearest city: Odda
- Coordinates: 60°5′N 6°24′E
- Area: 545.2 km^{2} (210.5 sq mi)
- Established: 29 April 2005
- Governing body: Norwegian Directorate for Nature Management

Folgefonna National Park (Norwegian: Folgefonna nasjonalpark) is a 545.2-square-kilometre (210.5 sq mi) national park in Vestland county, Norway. The park is located on the Folgefonna peninsula, and it spans the municipalities of Kvinnherad, Etne, and Ullensvang. The national park was opened by Queen Sonja on 14 May 2005.

Folgefonna is a collective term for three glaciers in the park (Nordre Folgefonna, Midtre Folgefonna, and Søndre Folgefonna). At 168 square kilometres (65 sq mi), Folgefonna is the third largest ice cap in Norway. It probably reaches a maximum thickness of 300 to 400 metres (980 to 1,310 ft). Its highest point is 1,662 metres (5,453 ft) above sea level, and this is believed to be one of the wettest places in Norway, receiving an estimated annual precipitation of around 5,500 millimetres (220 in).

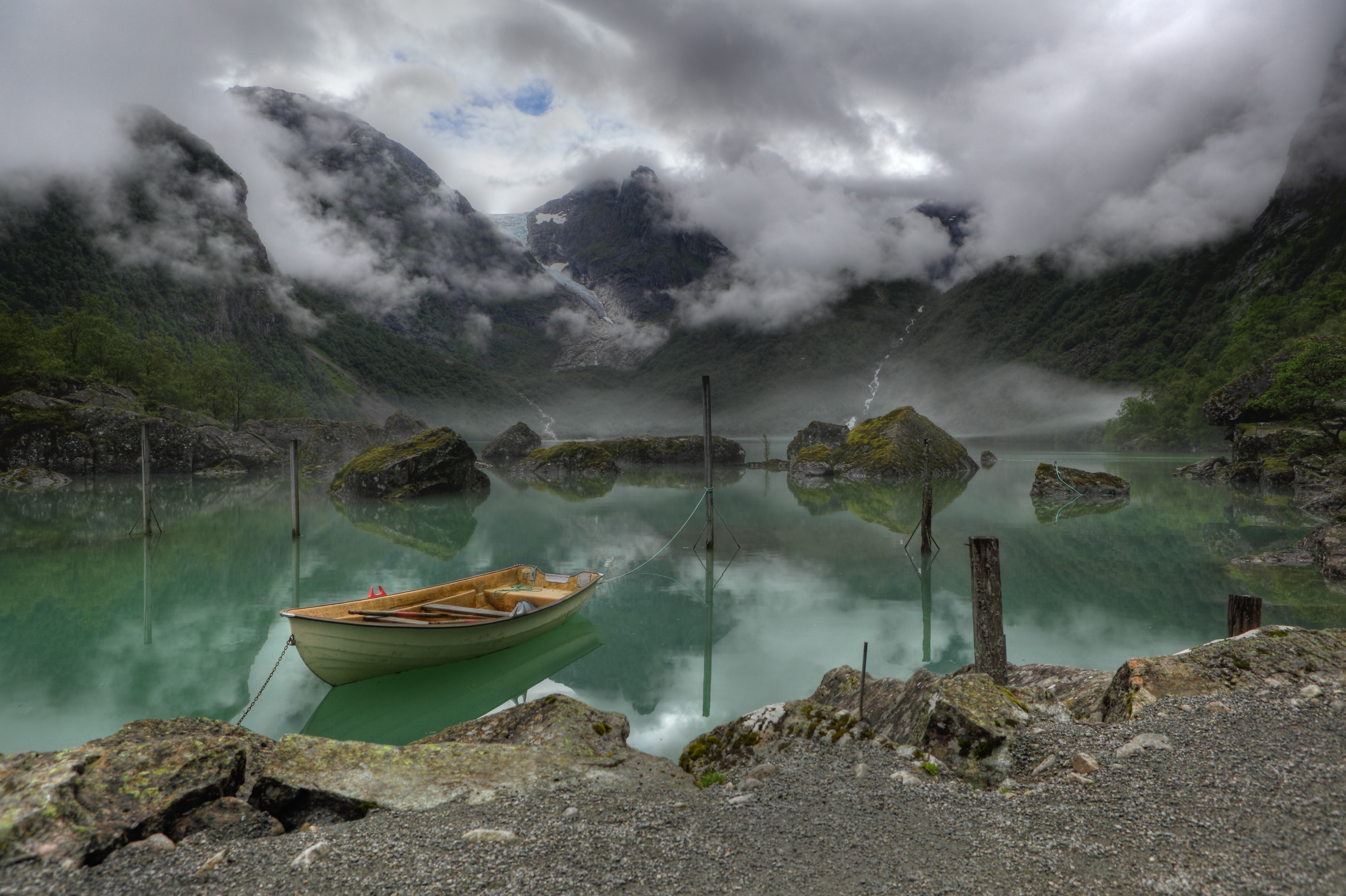
Lake Bondhus, glacier Bondhusbreen in the background, as a part of the Folgefonna Glacier

== Etymology ==
The first element is folge means 'thin layer of snow' and the last element is the finite form of fonn which means 'mass of snow' or 'glacier made of snow'.

== Flora and fauna ==
The high mountains of the park are too barren for many creatures to thrive, but there the ptarmigans thrive. Golden eagles nest in several valleys that reach up towards the glacier and they feed on the ptarmigans in the glacial areas. Meadow pipits are the most abundant species above the tree line. In the wooded areas below the tree line, red deer are abundant, in fact more red deer are shot in Kvinnherad Municipality than anywhere else in the country. Black grouse and capercaillie can also be found in the pine forests. This is also one of the last places to find the white-backed woodpecker in all of Western Europe. Avalanches in this area leave many dead trees in their paths and this is exactly the habitat favoured by these woodpeckers.

Hardy species like three-leaved rush, dwarf willow, and stiff sedge thrive despite the poor soils. Mossy mountain heather, rufine sedge, and arctic cottongrass can all grow right up to the edge of the glaciers. Purple gentian and mountain queen are notable flowering plants that thrive in the park.
