= Gihtsejiegŋa =

Glacier in Tysfjord, Norway

Gihtsejiegŋa (Lule Sami)
- Gihtsejiegńa, Gihtsejiekŋa, Gihccejiekŋa (historic spellings)
- Interactive map of Gihtsejiegŋa (Lule Sami)
- Location: Nordland, Norway
- Coordinates: 68.0094°N 16.8042°E
- Area: 25 km^{2} (9.7 sq mi)

Gihtsejiegŋa is one of the largest glaciers in mainland Norway. It is located in Narvik Municipality in Nordland county, about 20 kilometres (12 mi) southeast of the village of Kjøpsvik, on the border with Sweden. The name of the glacier comes from the Lule Sami language. The elevation of the glacier ranges from 1,500 to 870 metres (4,920 to 2,850 ft) above sea level. The highest point of the glacier sits right below the summit of the 1,520-metre (4,990 ft) tall Bjørntoppen.

== See also ==
- List of glaciers in Norway
