= Søndre Folgefonna =

Glacier in Vestland, Norway

- Southern Folgefonna
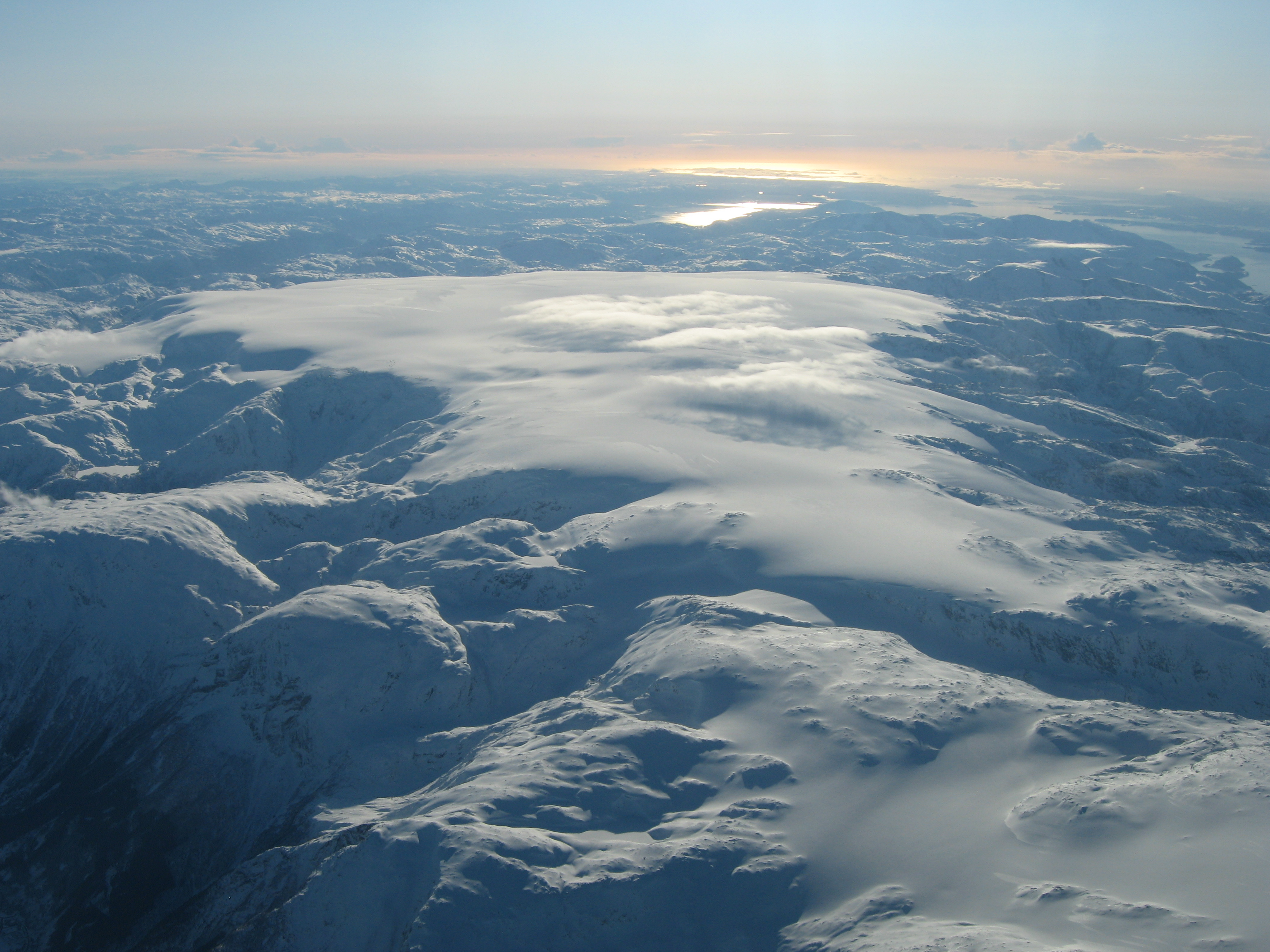
- Interactive map of Søndre Folgefonna
- Location: Vestland, Norway
- Coordinates: 60°00′N 06°20′E
- Area: 168 km^{2} (65 sq mi)
- Highest elevation: 1,660 metres (5,450 ft)
- Lowest elevation: 490 metres (1,610 ft)

Søndre Folgefonna (lit. 'Southern Folgefonna') is the third largest glacier in mainland Norway, and is the largest of the three glaciers constituting Folgefonna. The glacier is located at the base of the Folgefonna peninsula in Vestland county, along the border of Ullensvang Municipality, Etne Municipality, and Kvinnherad Municipality. The highest point on the glacier is 1,660 m (5,446 ft) above sea level and its lowest point is 490 m (1,608 ft) above sea level. The glacier is located inside Folgefonna National Park.

== See also ==
- List of glaciers in Norway
