= Stiff sedge =

Stiff sedge is a common name for several plants and may refer to:

- Carex bigelowii
- Carex biltmoreana, endemic to the southeastern United States
- Carex meadii - Mead's stiff sedge
