= Folgefonna =

Glaciers in Vestland, Norway

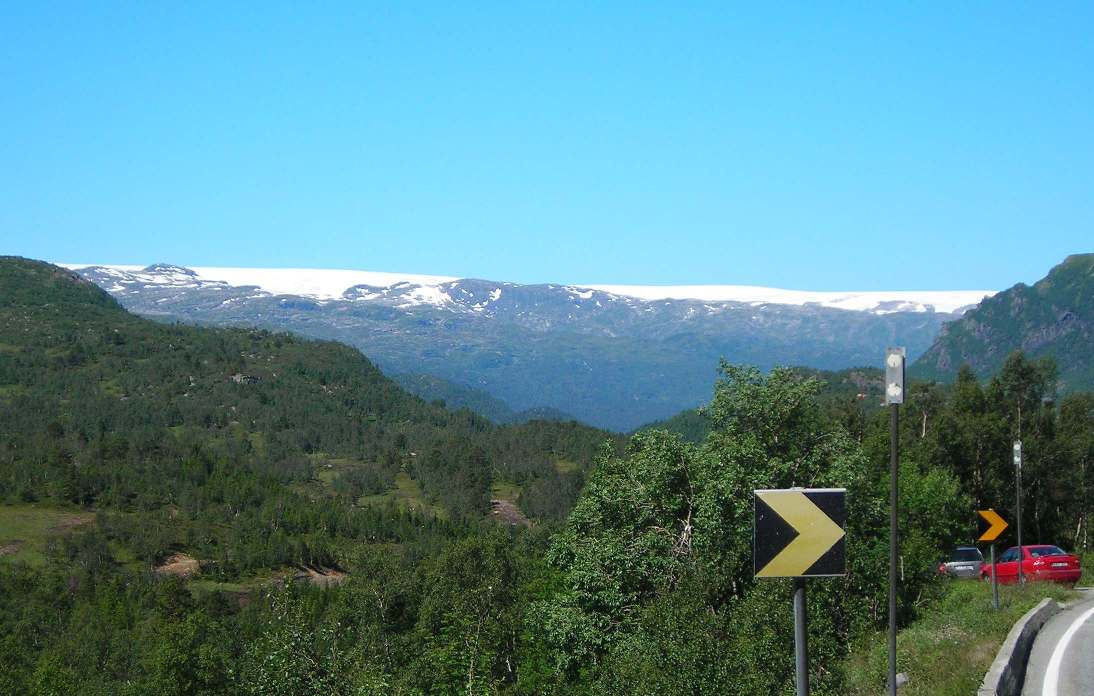
- Folgefonna seen from the road E134
- Interactive map of Folgefonna
- Type: Plateau glaciers
- Location: Vestland, Norway
- Coordinates: 60°00′N 6°20′E
- Area: 207 km^{2} (80 sq mi)
- Length: 36 kilometres (22 mi)
- Thickness: 375 metres (1,230 ft) (max.)

Folgefonna is a collective term for three plateau glaciers in the Hardanger region of Vestland county, Norway. They are located on the Folgefonna peninsula in Ullensvang Municipality, Kvinnherad Municipality, and Etne Municipality. The three glaciers are:

- Nordre (northern) Folgefonna, with an area of 26 square kilometres (10 sq mi)
- Midtre (central) Folgefonna, with an area of 11 square kilometres (4.2 sq mi)
- Søndre (southern) Folgefonna, with an area of 167 square kilometres (64 sq mi), making it the third largest glacier in the mainland of Norway.

In total, Folgefonna covers about 207 km^{2} (80 sq mi) (measured in 2006). On 14 May 2005, Folgefonna National Park was established, protecting the glaciers and the surrounding areas.

The glacier is home to a summer skiing resort, located on its northern region. The largest outflow glaciers from Folgefonna are Blomstølskardbreen, Bondhusbreen, and Buarbreen. Since around 1960, Blomstølskardbreen on the southern end of Folgefonna has changed very little. Bondhusbreen and Buerbreen further north were growing in the 1990s, but have been retreating since the year 2000. The glacier is a famous tourist attraction. Most people who visit the town of Odda usually take the walk to Buarbreen (a part of Folgafonna).

The melt-water from this glacier is bottled at source to form the product Isklar. The melt-water also goes down the river from Buarbreen down into the lake Sandvinvatnet.

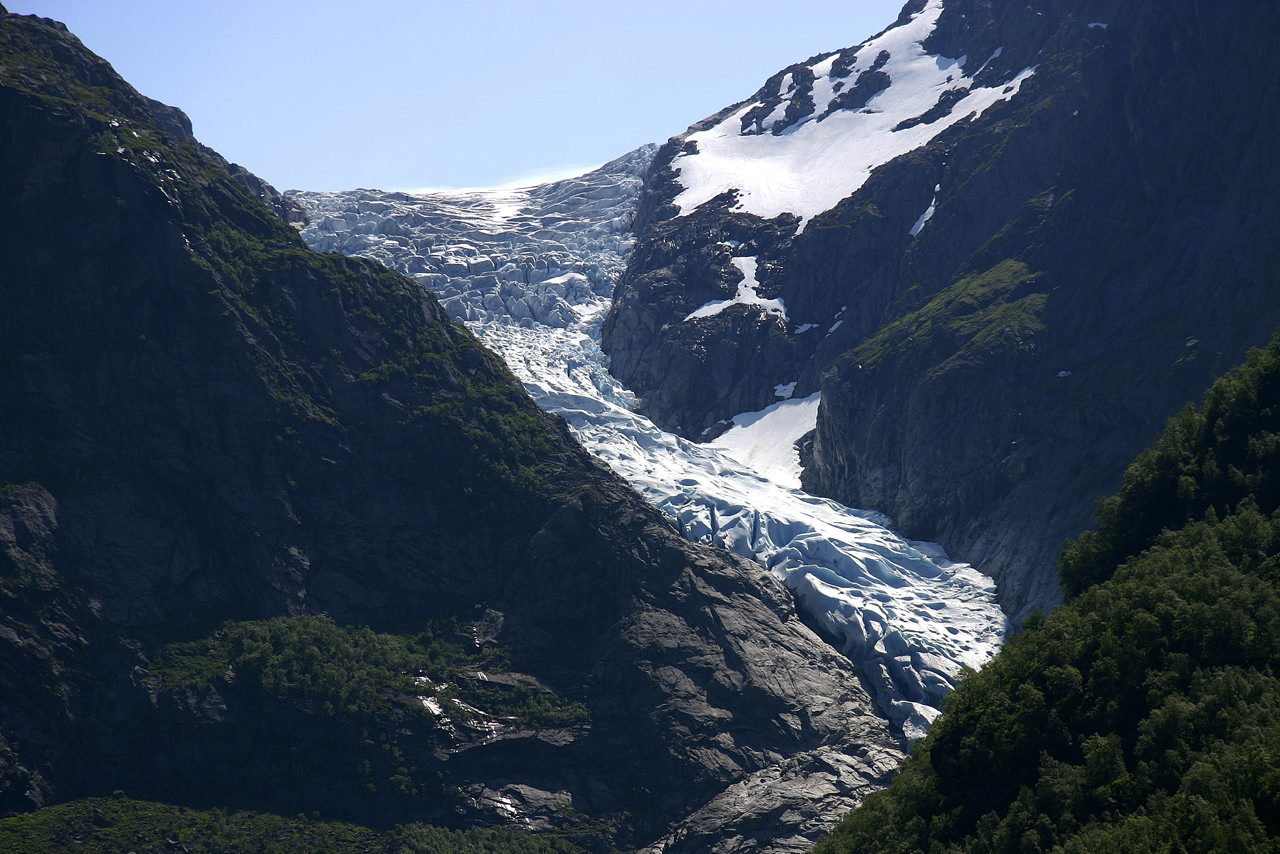
Bondhusbreen - an offshoot of Folgefonna

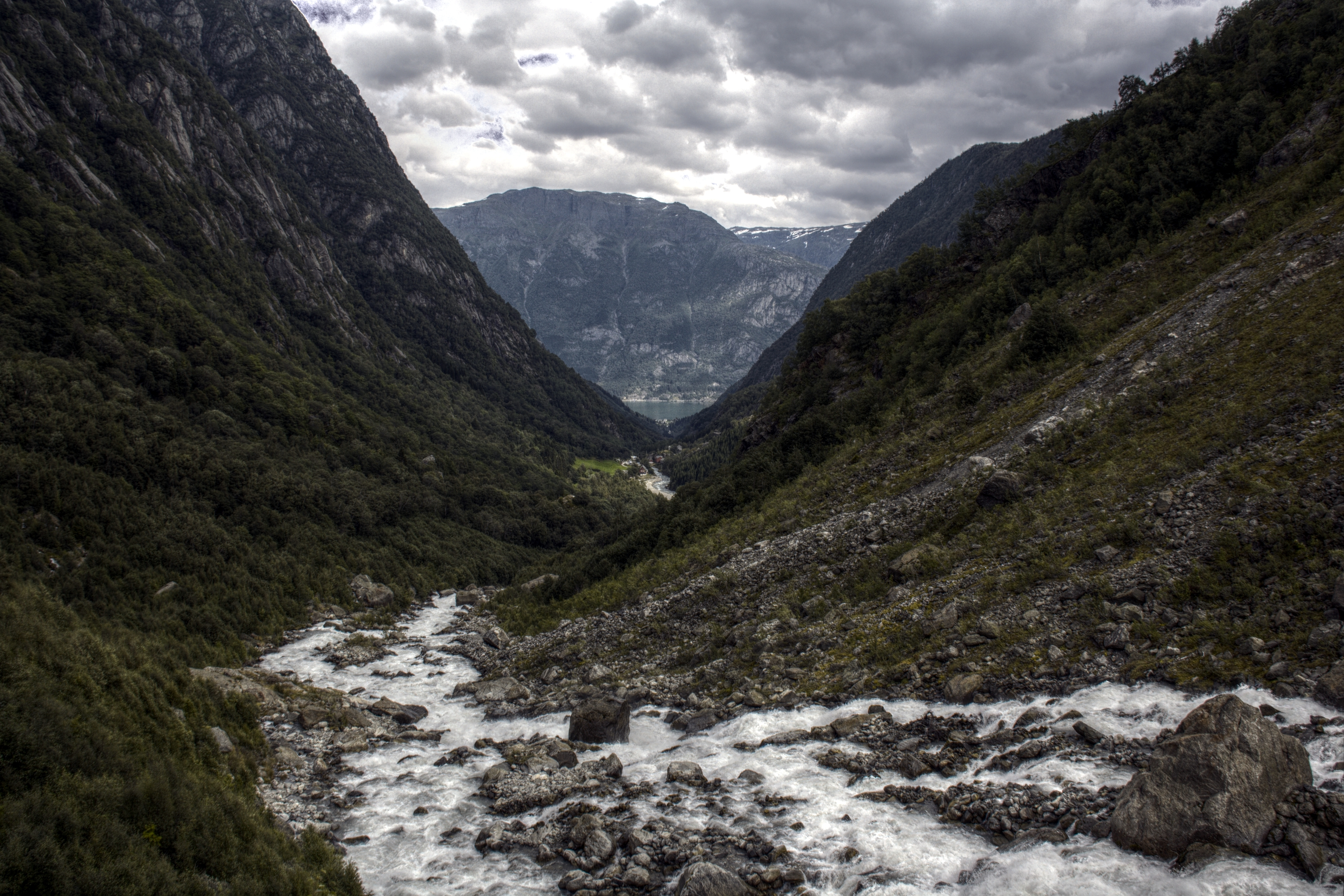
Looking down from the glacier

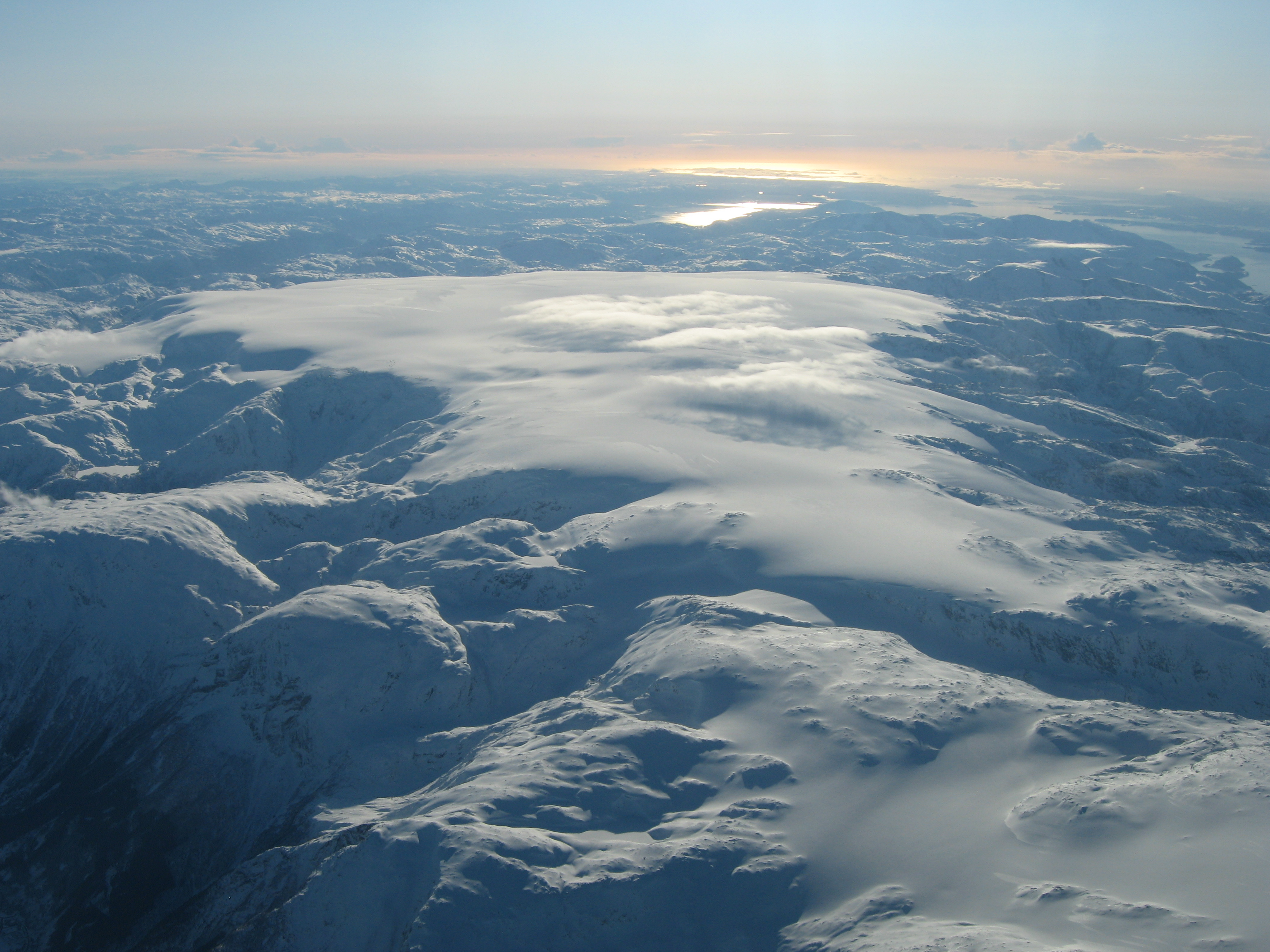
Aerial view of the glaciers

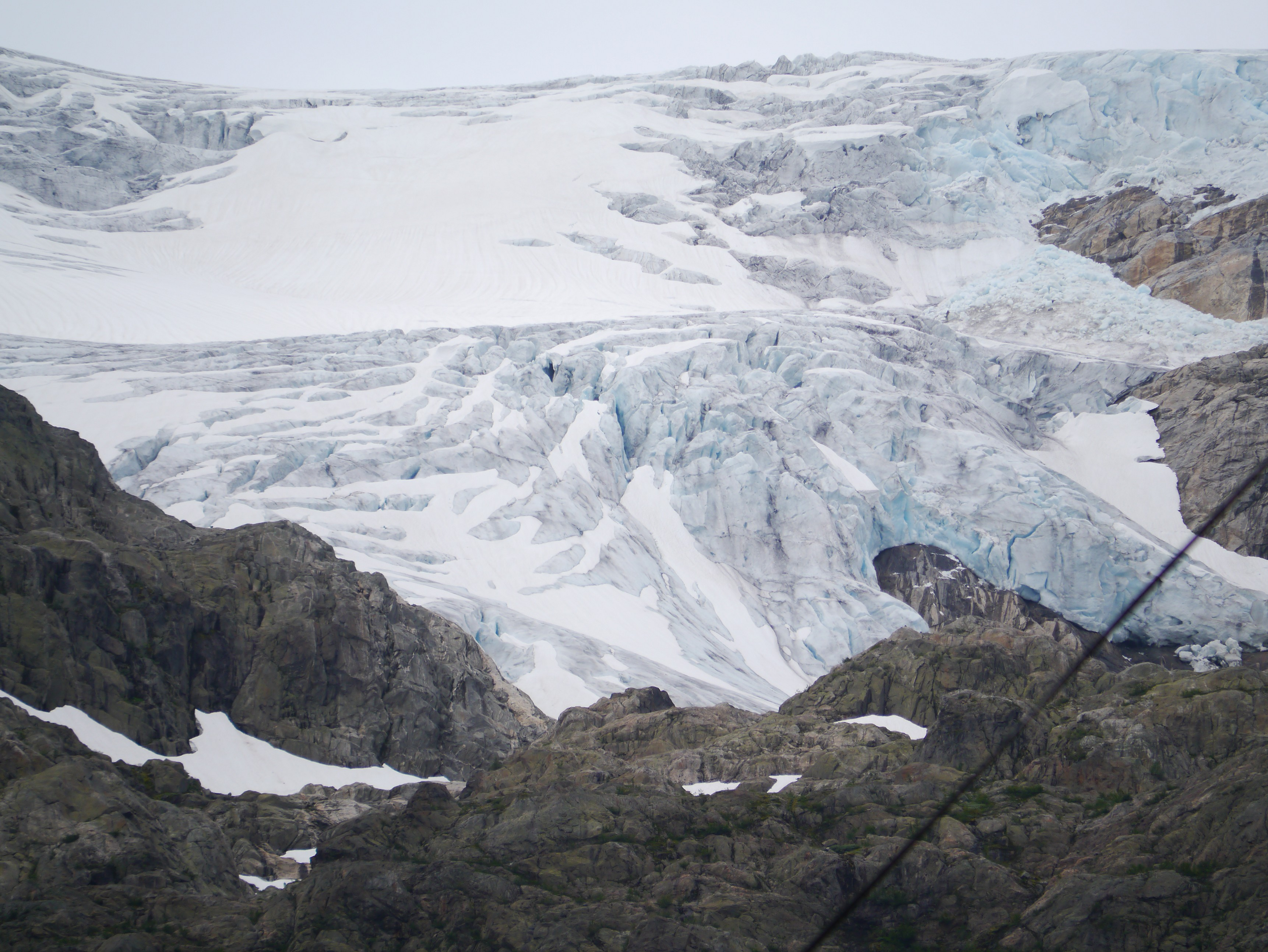
A closer view of the glacier

== Name ==
The first element is folge meaning 'thin layer of snow' and the last element is the finite form of fonn meaning 'mass of snow' or 'a glacier made of snow'.

== See also ==
- Folgefonna Tunnel
- List of glaciers in Norway
- List of mountains in Norway by prominence
