= Sørfjorden (Hardanger) =

Fjord in Vestland, Norway

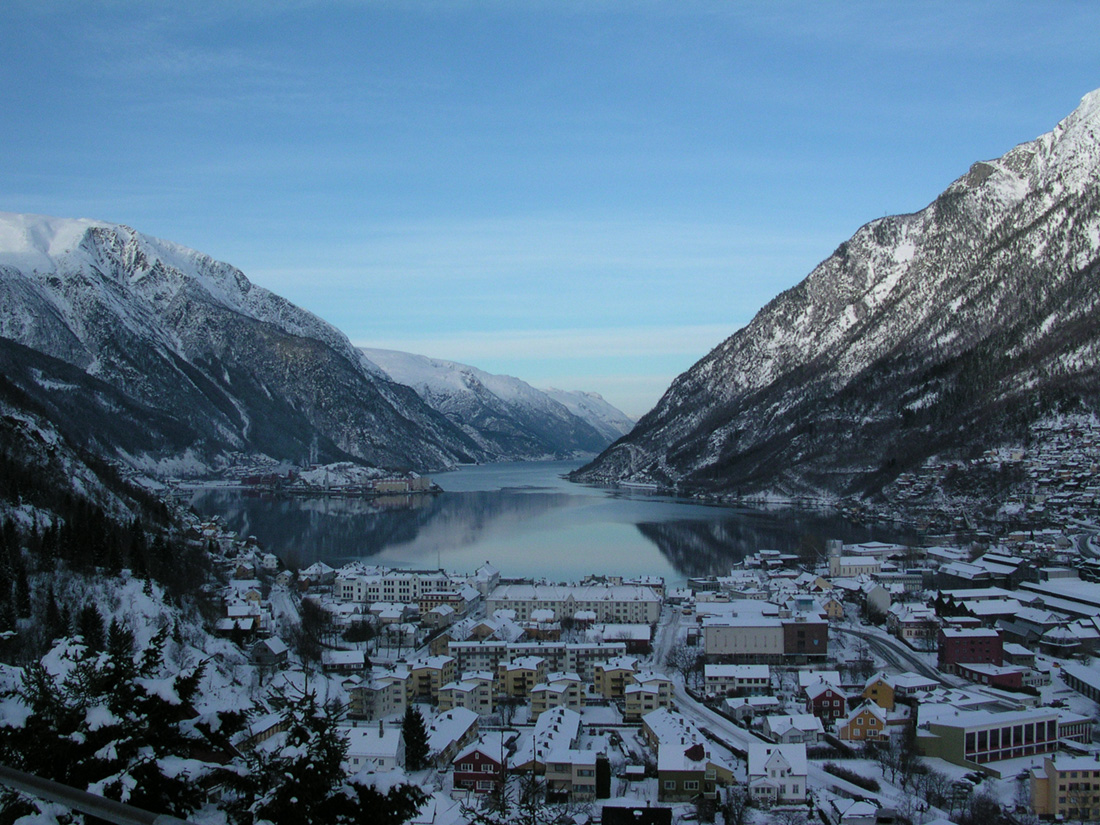
- View of the fjord, seen from Odda
- Interactive map of the fjord
- Location: Vestland county, Norway
- Coordinates: 60.1839°N 6.5711°E
- Type: Fjord
- Primary outflows: Hardangerfjorden
- Basin countries: Norway
- Max. length: 38 kilometres (24 mi)
- Max. width: 2.8 kilometres (1.7 mi)
- Settlements: Odda, Lofthus, Kinsarvik

Sørfjorden is a 38-kilometre (24 mi) long fjord that is one of the innermost branches of the main Hardangerfjorden. It is located in Ullensvang Municipality in Vestland county, Norway. It is the longest arm that branches off of the Hardangerfjord. Sørfjorden stretches from just north of the village of Kinsarvik straight south to the industrial town of Odda. The Folgefonna glacier and Folgefonna National Park are located just to the west of the fjord and the Hardangervidda mountain plateau lies to its east.

Some of the notable villages that line the sides of the fjord include (north to south): Kinsarvik, Lofthus, Vikebygd, Tyssedal, Eitrheim, and Odda. Norwegian National Road 13 follows the eastern shoreline of the fjord. All the villages along the fjord are filled with fruit farms and orchards, growing fruits like apples and cherries.

== Media gallery ==
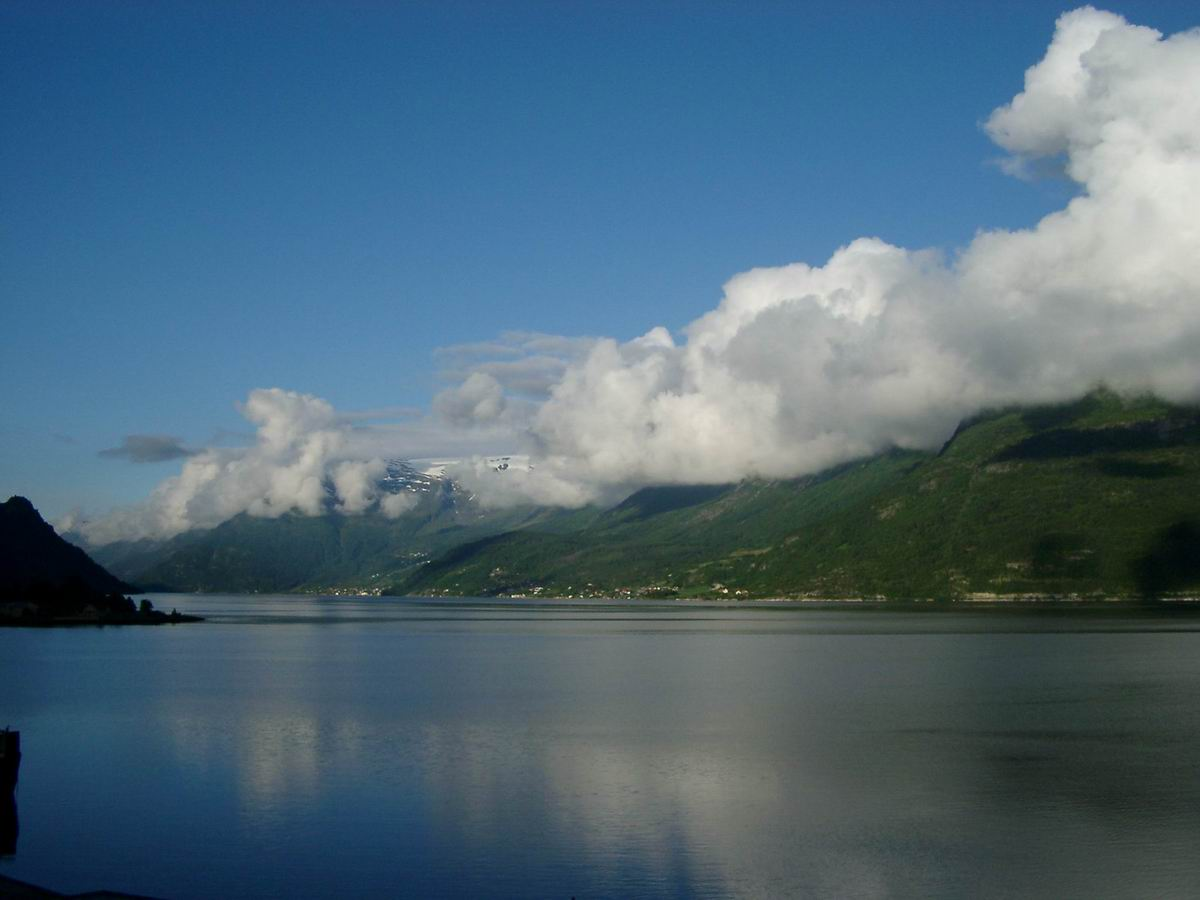
View of the fjord in the Lofthus area

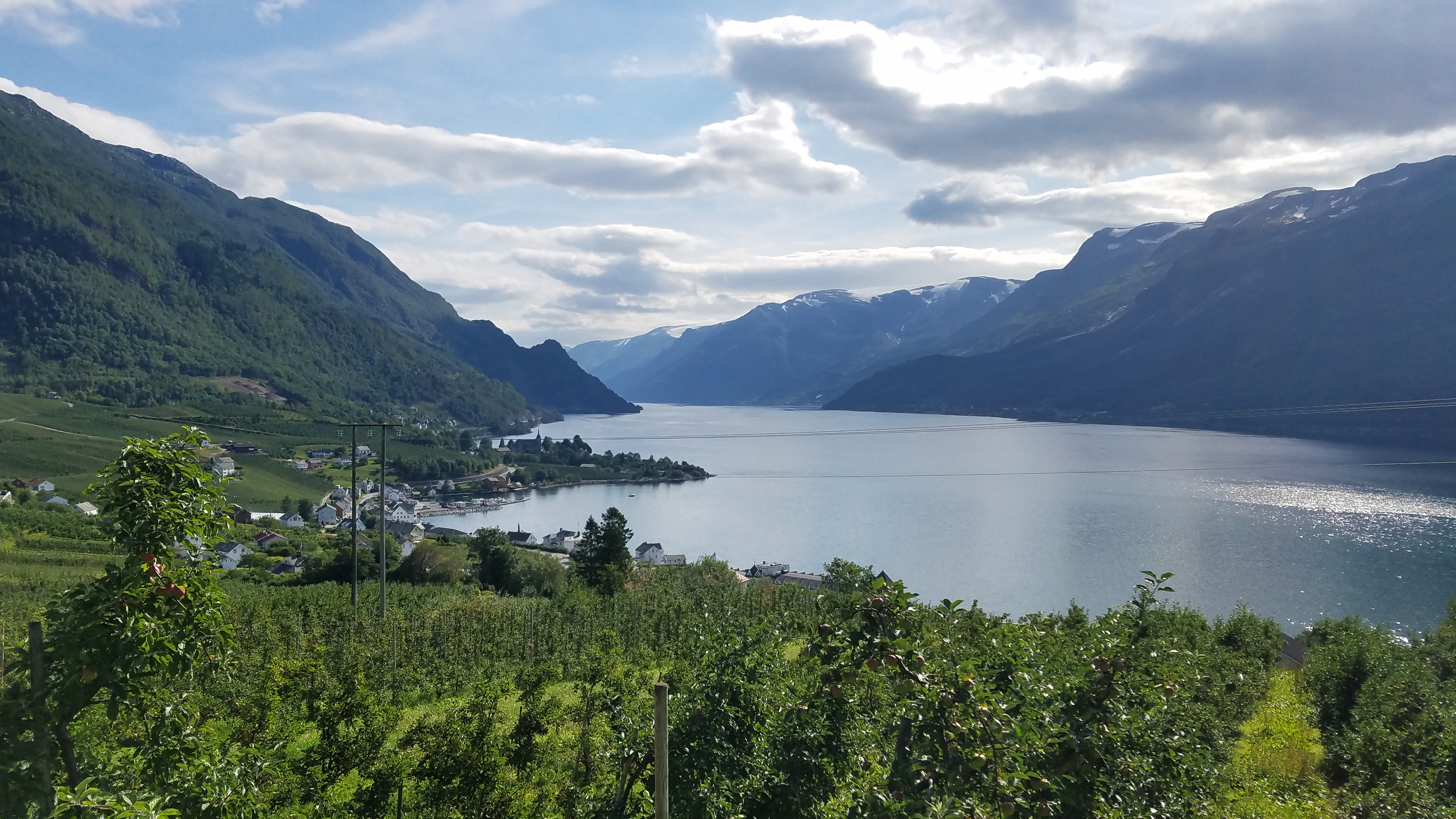
Orchards overlooking the fjord

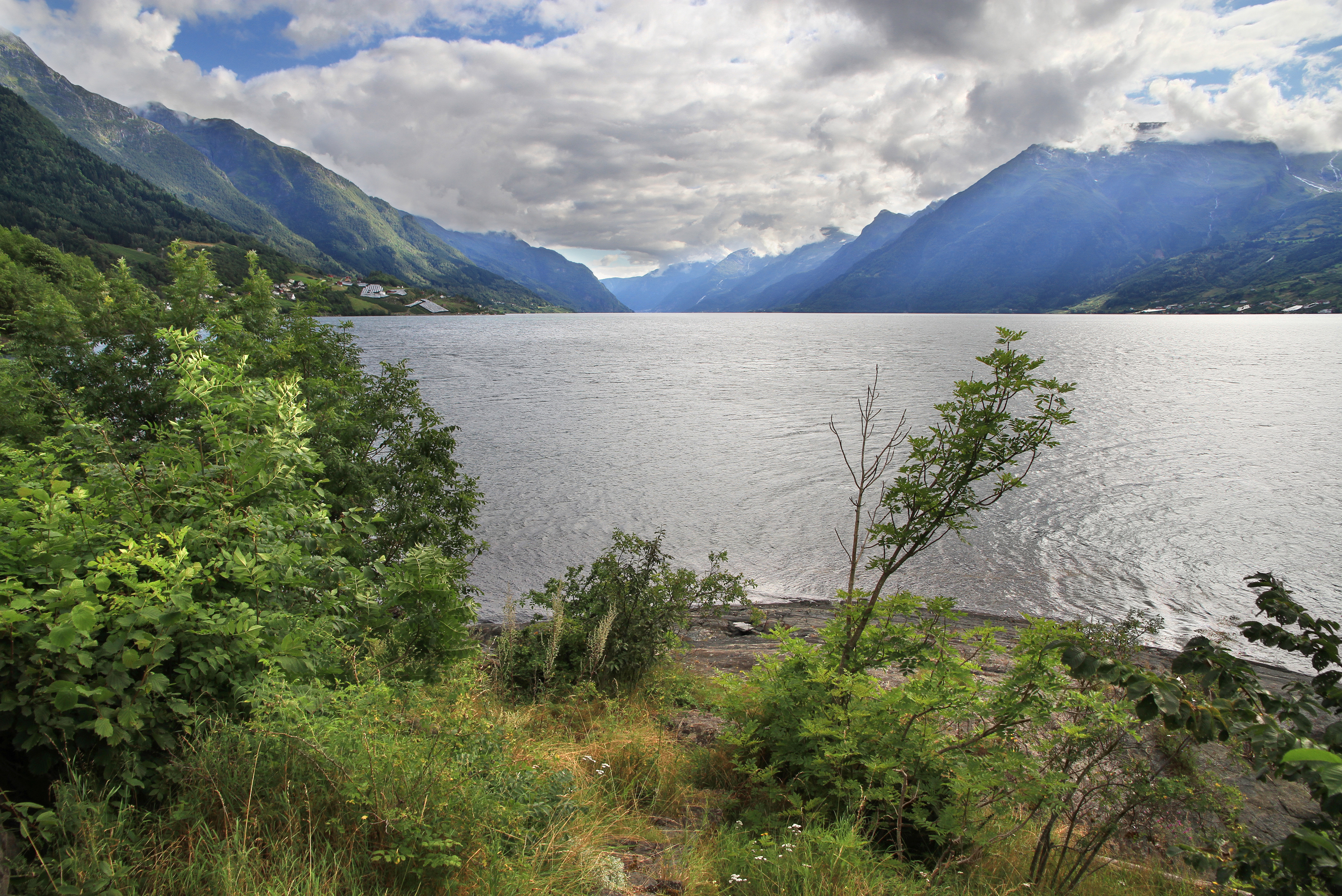
Looking south along the fjord

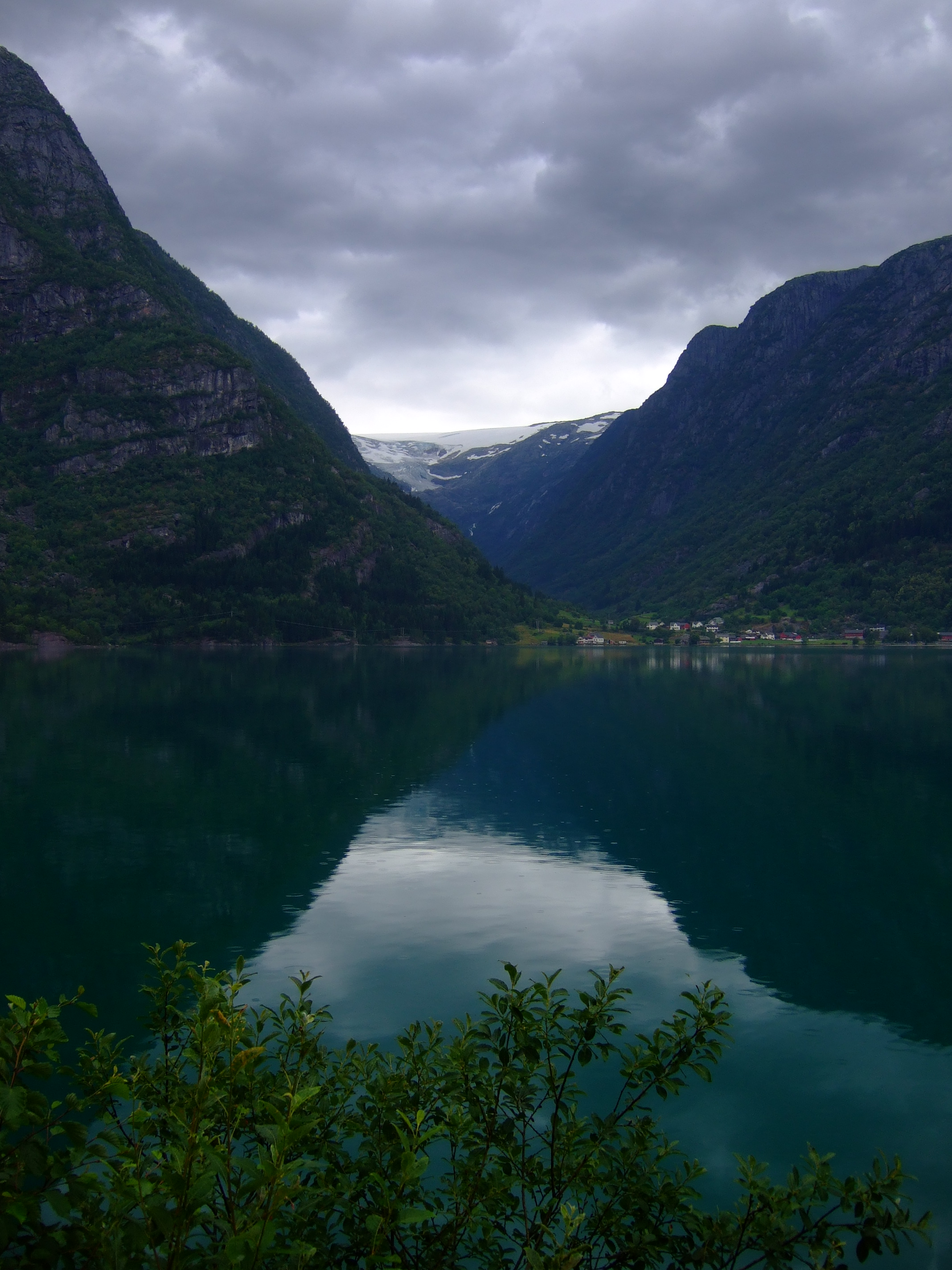
Looking east towards the Folgefonna glacier

== See also ==
- List of Norwegian fjords
