= List of glaciers in Norway =

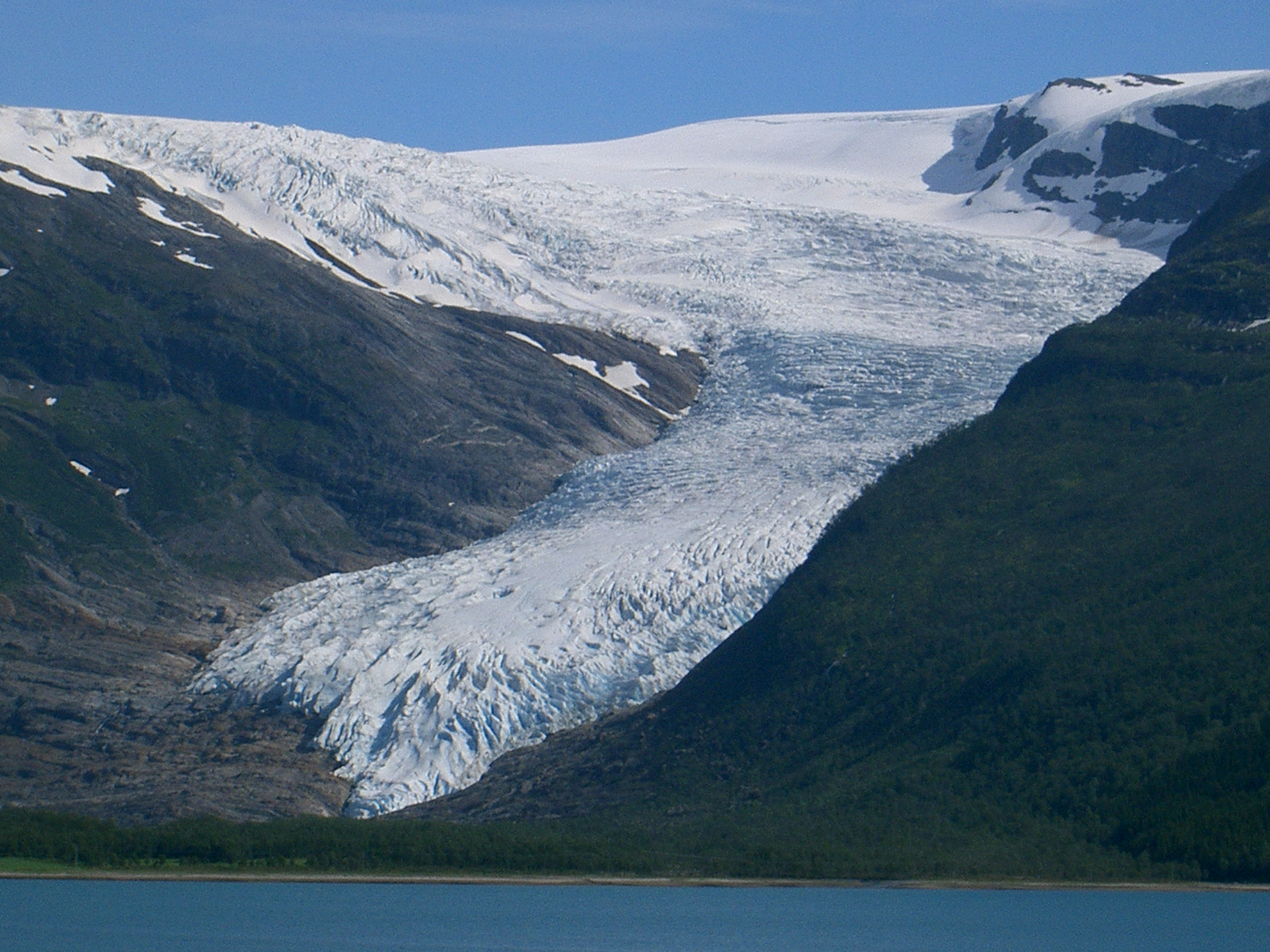
One of the extensions of Svartisen, Engabreen ends at the lowest point of any glacier on the European mainland, at 7 meters above sea level (in 2004).

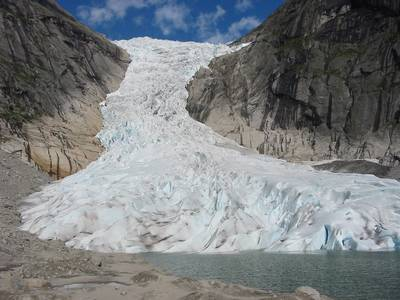
Briksdalsbreen is one of the more popular parts of Jostedalsbreen (Image from 2005)

These are the largest glaciers on mainland Norway. However, the 18 largest glaciers in the Kingdom of Norway are on Svalbard, including the second largest glacier in Europe, Austfonna on Nordaustlandet. In total, Norway has around 1,600 glaciers - 900 of these are in North Norway, but 60% of the total glacier area is south of Trøndelag. 1% of mainland Norway is covered by glaciers.

== List ==
Name	Area (km²)	County in Norway	Coordinates
Jostedalsbreen	487	Sogn og Fjordane	61°40′N 06°59′E
Vestre Svartisen	221	Nordland	66°38′N 14°00′E
Søndre Folgefonna	168	Hordaland	60°00′N 06°20′E
Østre Svartisen	148	Nordland	66°38′N 14°00′E
Blåmannsisen (Ålmåjalosjiegŋa)	87	Nordland	67°15′N 16°04′E
Hardangerjøkulen	73	Hordaland	60°32′N 07°25′E
Myklebustbreen (Snønipebreen)	57	Sogn og Fjordane	61°42′N 06°42′E
Okstindbreen	46	Nordland	65°59′N 14°9′E
Øksfjordjøkelen (Ákšovunjiehkki)	41	Finnmark, Troms	70°10′N 22°03′E
Harbardsbreen	36	Sogn og Fjordane	61°40′N 07°39′E
Salajekna (Sállajiegŋa)	33	Nordland	67°08′N 16°10′E
Frostisen	25	Nordland	68°14′N 17°11′E
Gihtsejiegŋa	25	Nordland	68°00′N 16°48′E
Sekkebreen/Sikilbreen	24	Oppland	61°51′N 07°34′E
Tindefjellbreen	22	Sogn og Fjordane	61°52′N 07°03′E
Simlebreen	21	Nordland	66°50′N 14°27′E
Tystigbreen	21	Sogn og Fjordane	61°55′N 07°22′E
Holåbreen	20	Oppland	61°45′N 07°54′E
Grovabreen	20	Sogn og Fjordane	61°29′N 06°31′E
Ålfotbreen	17	Sogn og Fjordane	61°44′N 05°38′E
Fresvikbreen	15	Sogn og Fjordane	
Sørbreen	15	Jan Mayen	
Seilandsjøkelen	14	Finnmark	
Smørstabbrean	14	Oppland	
Strupbreen/Koppangbreen	13	Troms	
Gjegnalundsbreen	13	Sogn og Fjordane	
Vestre Memurubreen/Hellstugubreen	12	Oppland	
Spidstinden	12	Nordland	
Storsteinsfjellbreen	12	Nordland	
Jostefonn	12	Sogn og Fjordane	
Midtre Folgefonna	11	Hordaland	
Veobreen	9	Oppland	
Weyprechtbreen	8.9	Jan Mayen	
Langfjordjøkelen	8	Finnmark	
Kjerulfbreen	5.8	Jan Mayen	

== See also ==
- List of Norwegian fjords
- List of glaciers
