= Odda (town) =

Town in Vestland, Norway

- Town/City
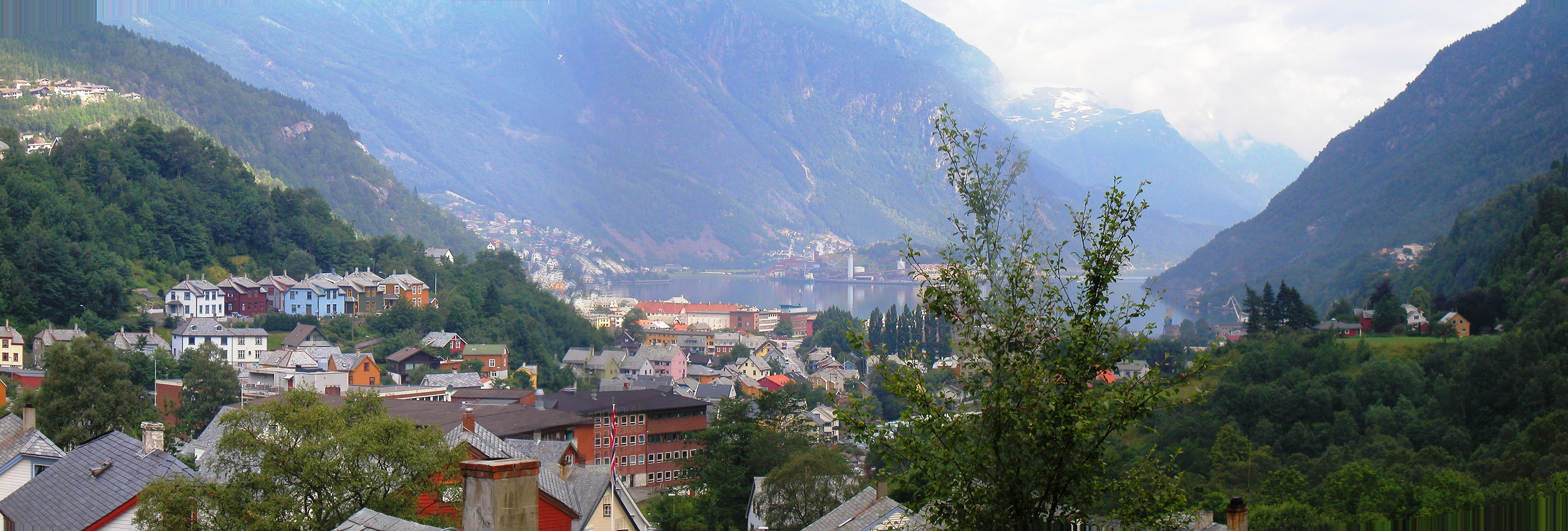
- View of the town
- Interactive map of Odda
- Coordinates: 60.0691°N 6.5456°E
- Country: Norway
- Region: Western Norway
- County: Vestland
- District: Hardanger
- Municipality: Ullensvang Municipality
- Established as
- By (town): 2004

Area
  - Total: 3.02 km^{2} (1.17 sq mi)
- Elevation: 3 m (9.8 ft)

Population (2025)
  - Total: 4,750
  - Density: 1,573/km^{2} (4,070/sq mi)
- Demonym: Odding
- Time zone: UTC+01:00 (CET)
  - Summer (DST): UTC+02:00 (CEST)
- Post Code: 5750 Odda

Odda is a town in Ullensvang Municipality in Vestland county, Norway. The town is the administrative centre of the municipality and the largest urban area in the whole Hardanger district. The town is located at the southern end of the Sørfjorden, in a narrow valley between towering mountains and the lake Sandvinvatnet to the south. The large Folgefonna glacier lies just west of Odda, high up in the mountains. The village of Odda was declared a "town" in 2004.

The 3.02-square-kilometre (750-acre) town has a population (2025) of 4,750 and a population density of 1,573 inhabitants per square kilometre (4,070/sq mi). The town also includes the Eitrheim area, just northwest of the town centre. Odda Church is located in the town centre. Norwegian National Road 13 is the main road going through the town.

== History ==
Odda has been populated for centuries, but in the 19th century, Odda became a significant tourist destination, and it was the centre of Odda Municipality (which existed from 1913 until 2020). Visits ranged from English pioneers around 1830 to German Emperor Kaiser Wilhelm II, who visited Odda every year between 1891 and 1914. This led to the construction of several hotels in the town. Some of the main tourist attractions around Odda include the Buarbreen glacier, the nearby Folgefonna glacier, and the Hardangervidda plateau.

The present Odda is a modern town which grew up around smelters built at the head of the Sørfjorden branch of the main Hardangerfjorden in the mid-twentieth century, drawing migrants from different parts of Norway.

The carbide production and the subsequent production of cyanamide was started in 1908 after the hydroelectric power plant was built in nearby Tyssedal. The power plant provided the necessary electricity for the arc furnaces. The plant was the largest in the world and remained operational until 2003 when the plant was closed and sold to Philipp Brothers Chemicals Inc. The Norwegian government tried to get the site recognized together with other industrial plants as a UNESCO World Heritage Site. In 2010, an international report stated: What makes Odda smelteverk so important and central to the application of Norway’s hydro power sites and pioneer chemical industry as a World Heritage Site is the fact that here in an internationally unique way the physical remains of an early chemical production process are still present.

On 1 January 2020, Odda Municipality (of which the town of Odda was part) was merged into the newly enlarged Ullensvang Municipality.

== Health care ==
Odda Hospital provides health services to the inhabitants of the Hardanger region as part of the Fonna Hospital Trust. The ambulance station, Folgefonn DPS Odda and the municipal hospital are also located in the hospital area. The population can also receive health services at local health stations.

== Dialect ==
The town of Odda grew up around this smelter in the early-twentieth century, drawing migrants from different parts of Norway. As a result, there developed a new dialect, a mixture of that spoken in the home regions of the migrants—a phenomenon termed by linguists "a Koiné language". Odda and the neighboring village of Tyssedal provided valuable insights to linguists studying this phenomenon. The researcher Paul Kerswill conducted an intensive study of the Norwegian spoken in the two communities, relating them to very different geographical origins: The workers in Odda came predominantly (86%) from western Norway. In Tyssedal only about one third came from western Norway; one third came from eastern Norway; and the rest from other parts of the country. The dialects that evolved in these two communities were radically different from each other, though spoken at a short geographical distance from each other.

== Media gallery ==
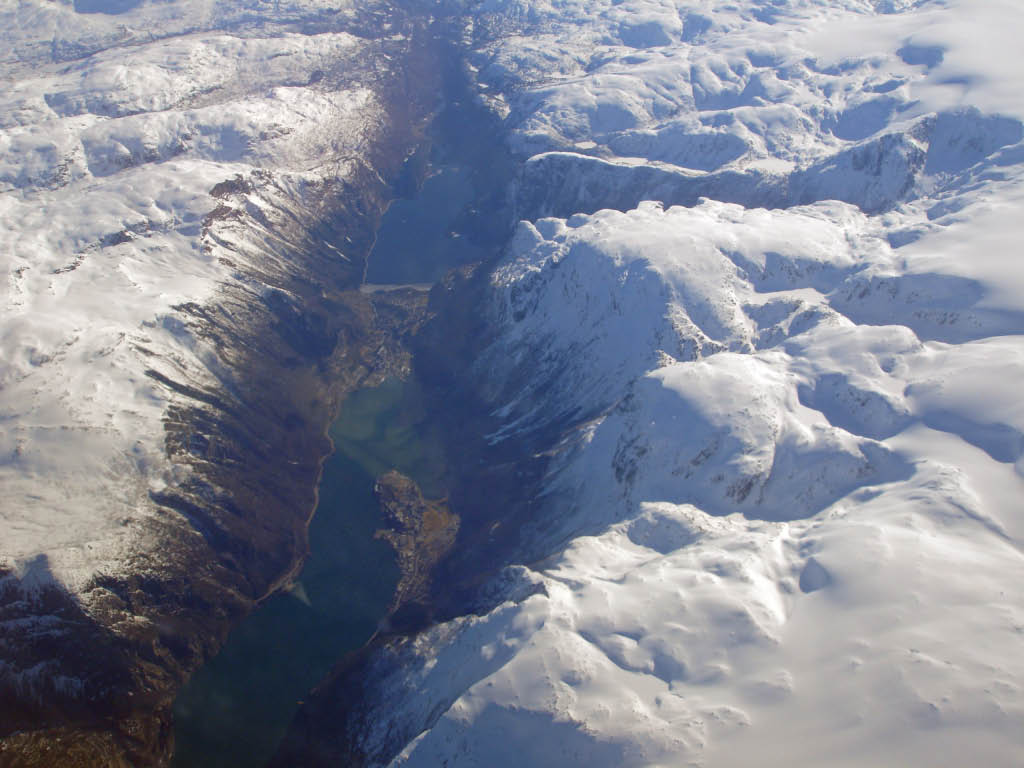
Aerial view, looking south. The fjord is on the bottom of the picture, then the town, then the lake Sandvinvatnet at the top. The snow-covered mountains surround the town.

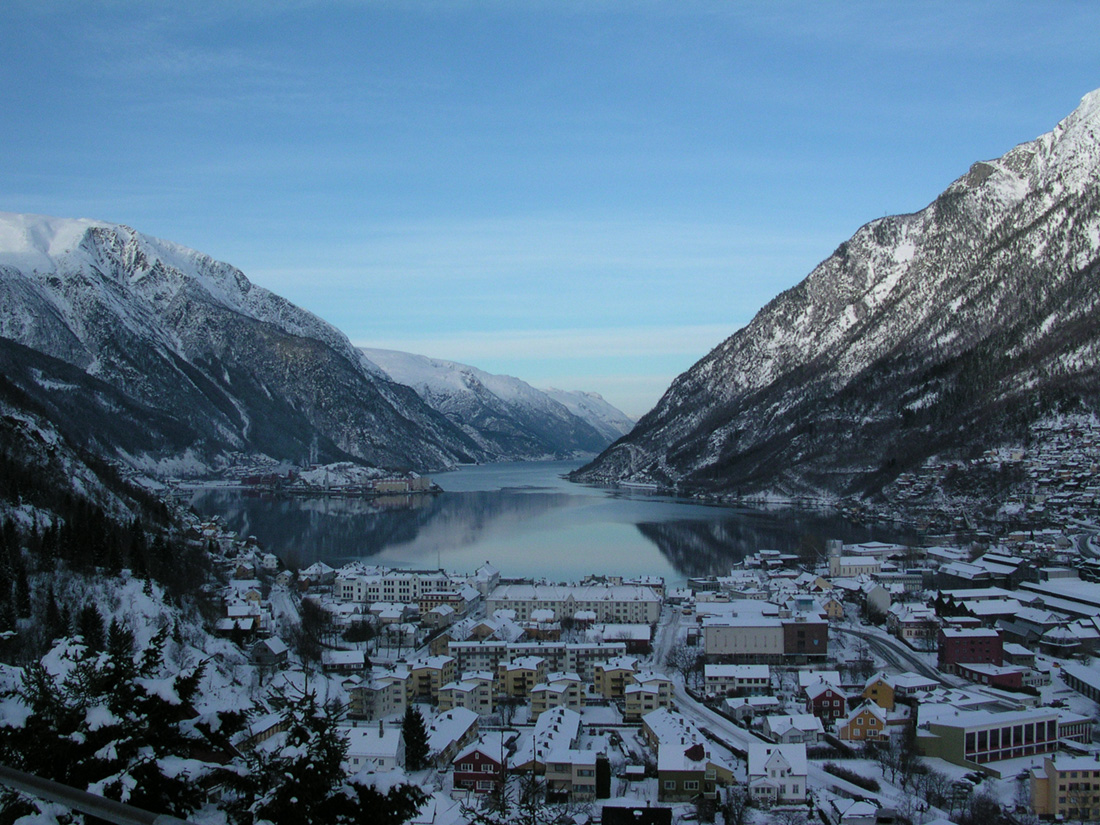
View of the town in February 2004

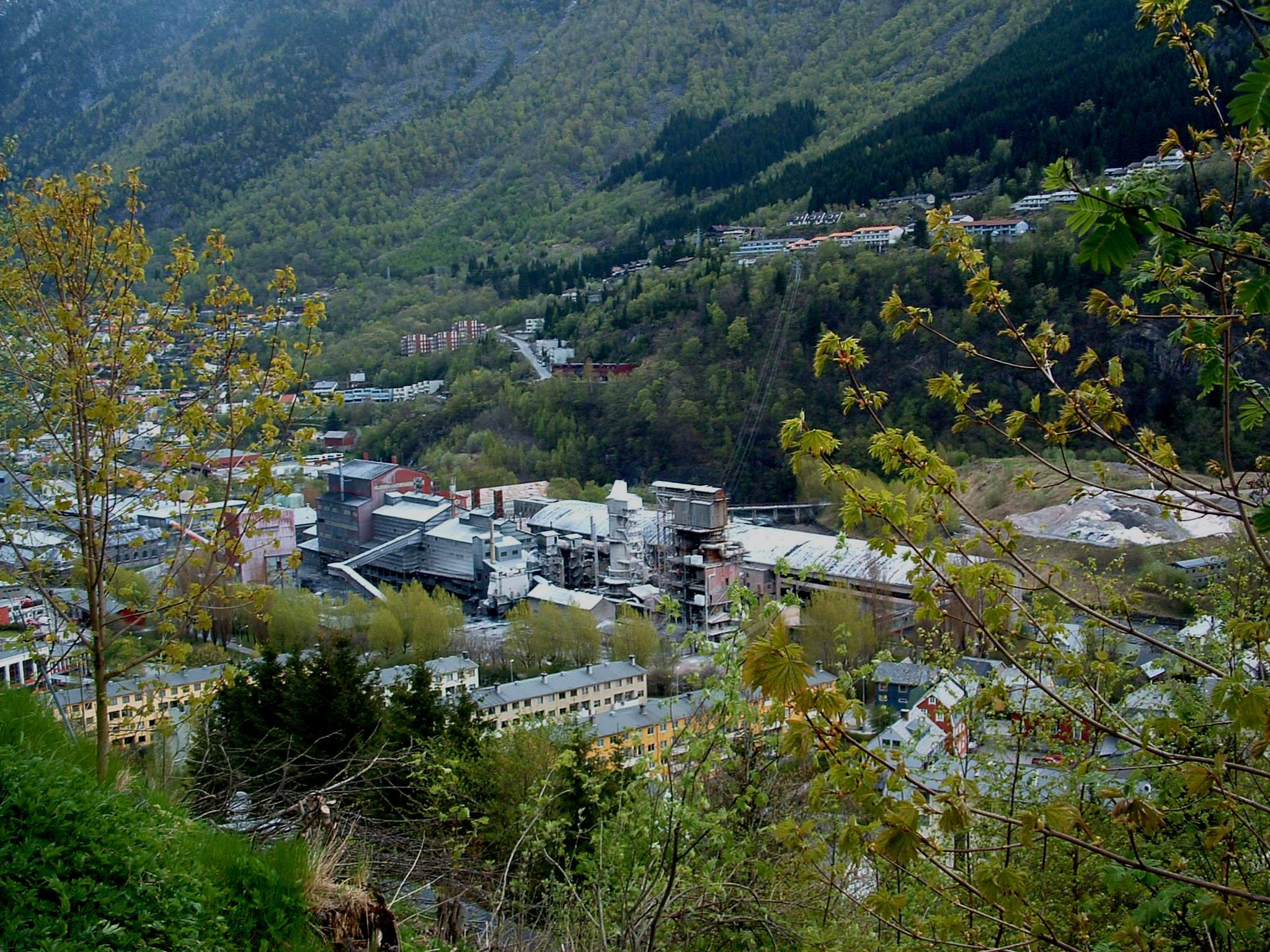
View of the Odda smelting factory

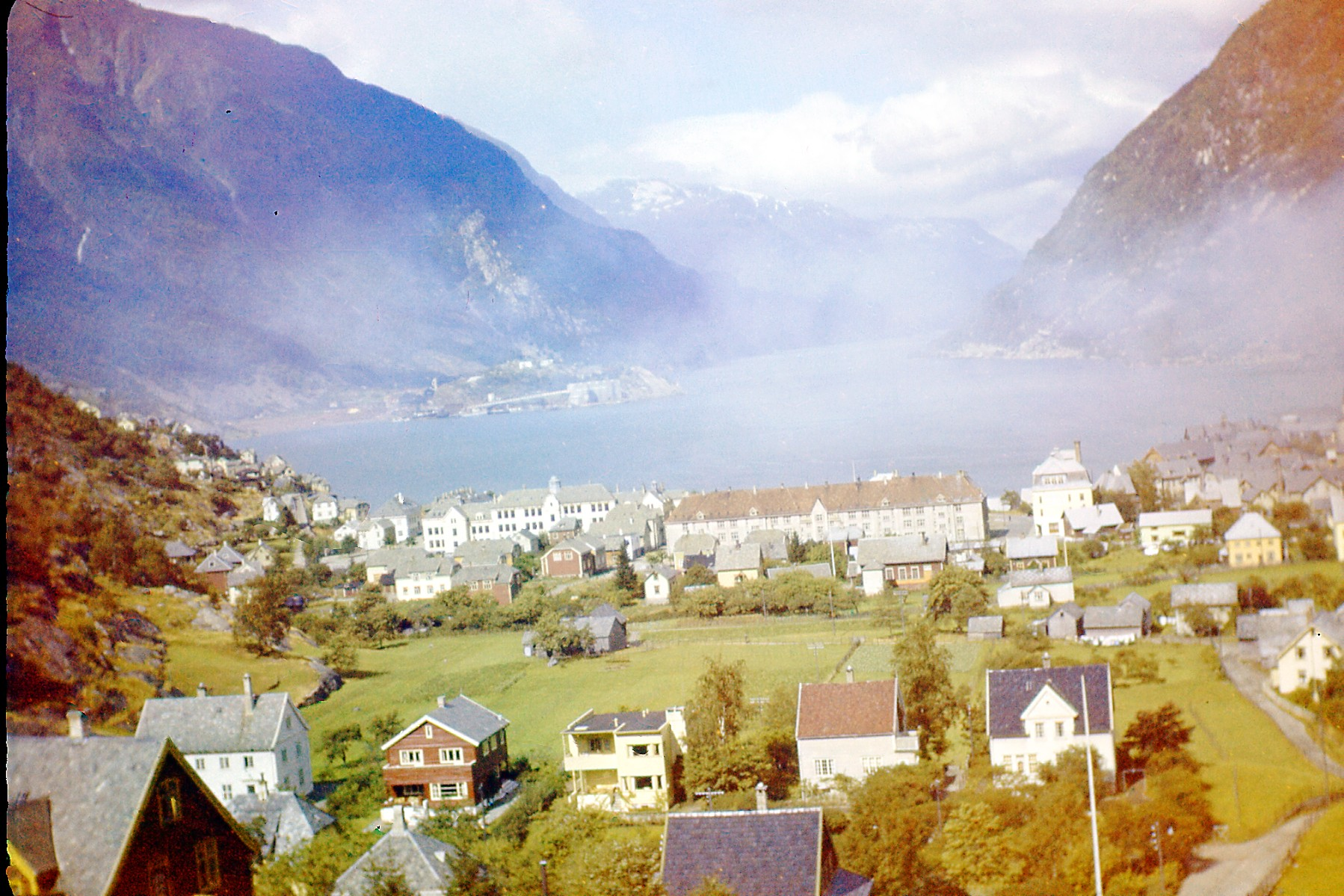
View of the town in the 1950s

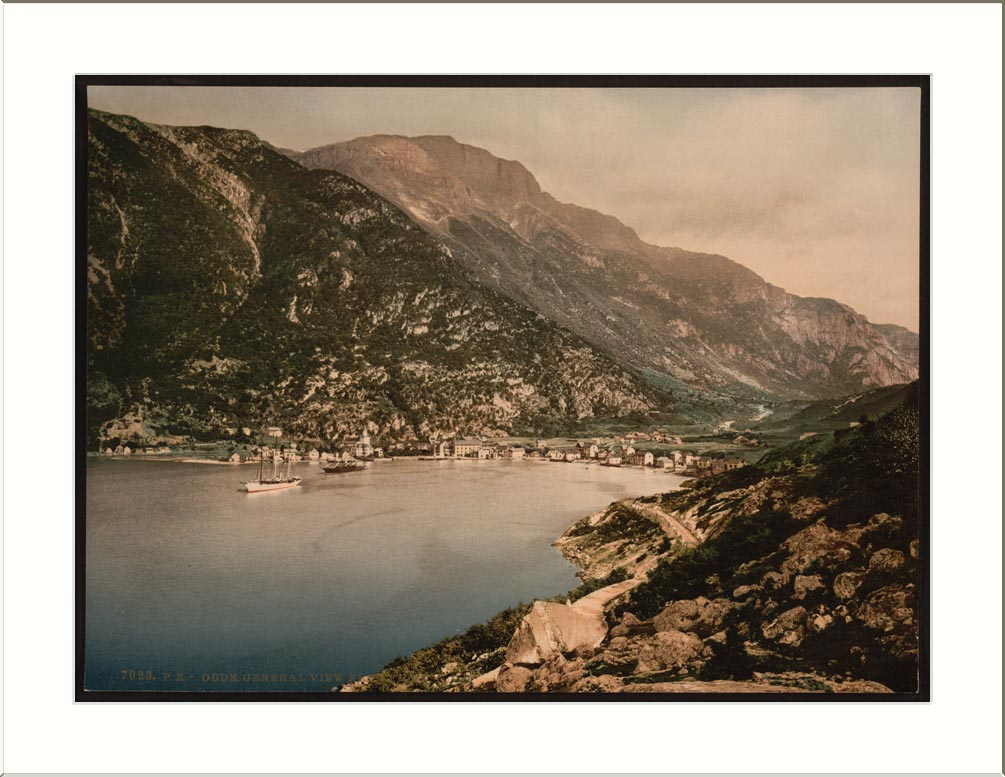
View of the harbour (c. 1895)

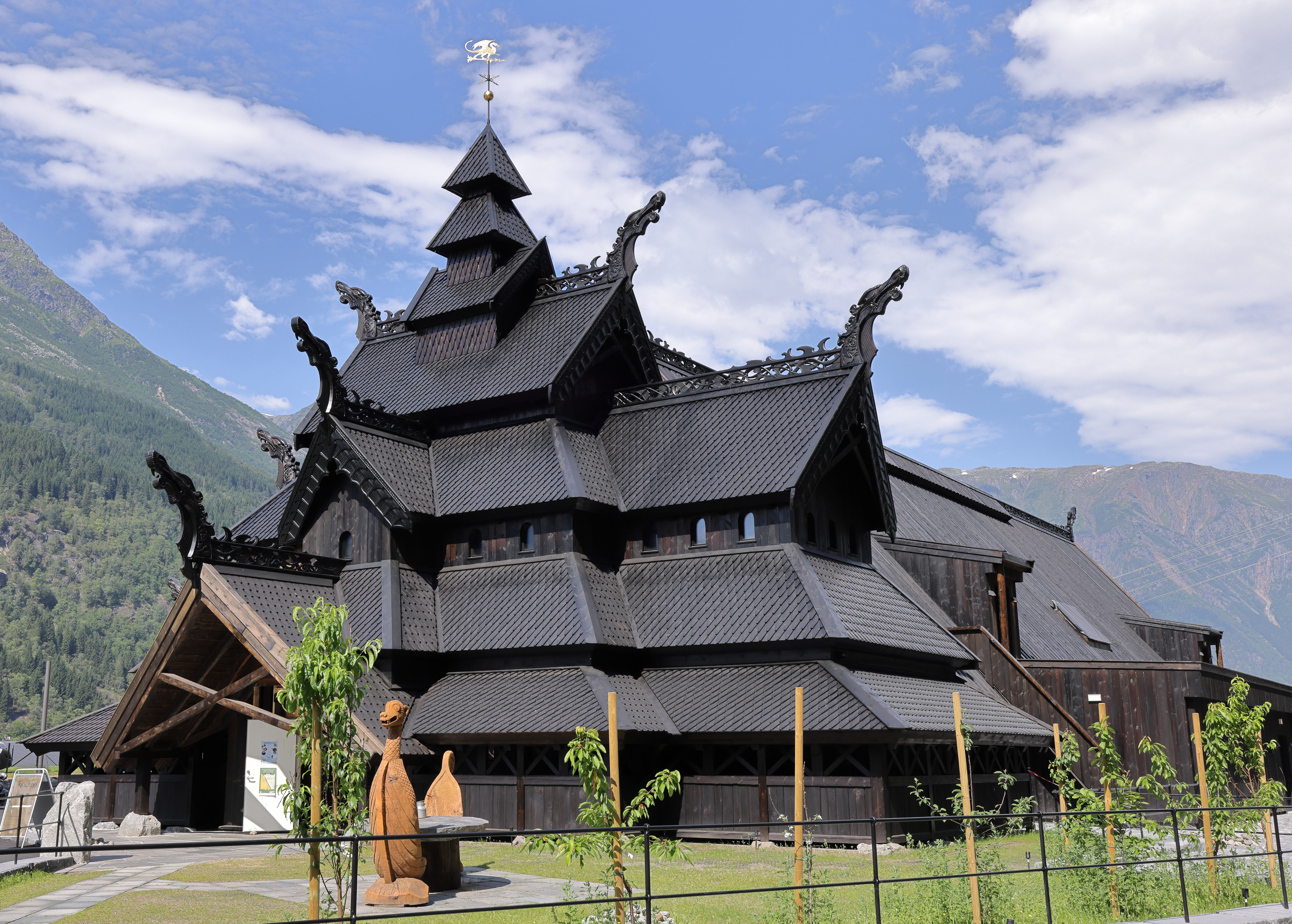
Imitation of a stave church in Odda

== See also ==
- List of towns and cities in Norway
