= Hardanger =

Traditional district in Norway

- District
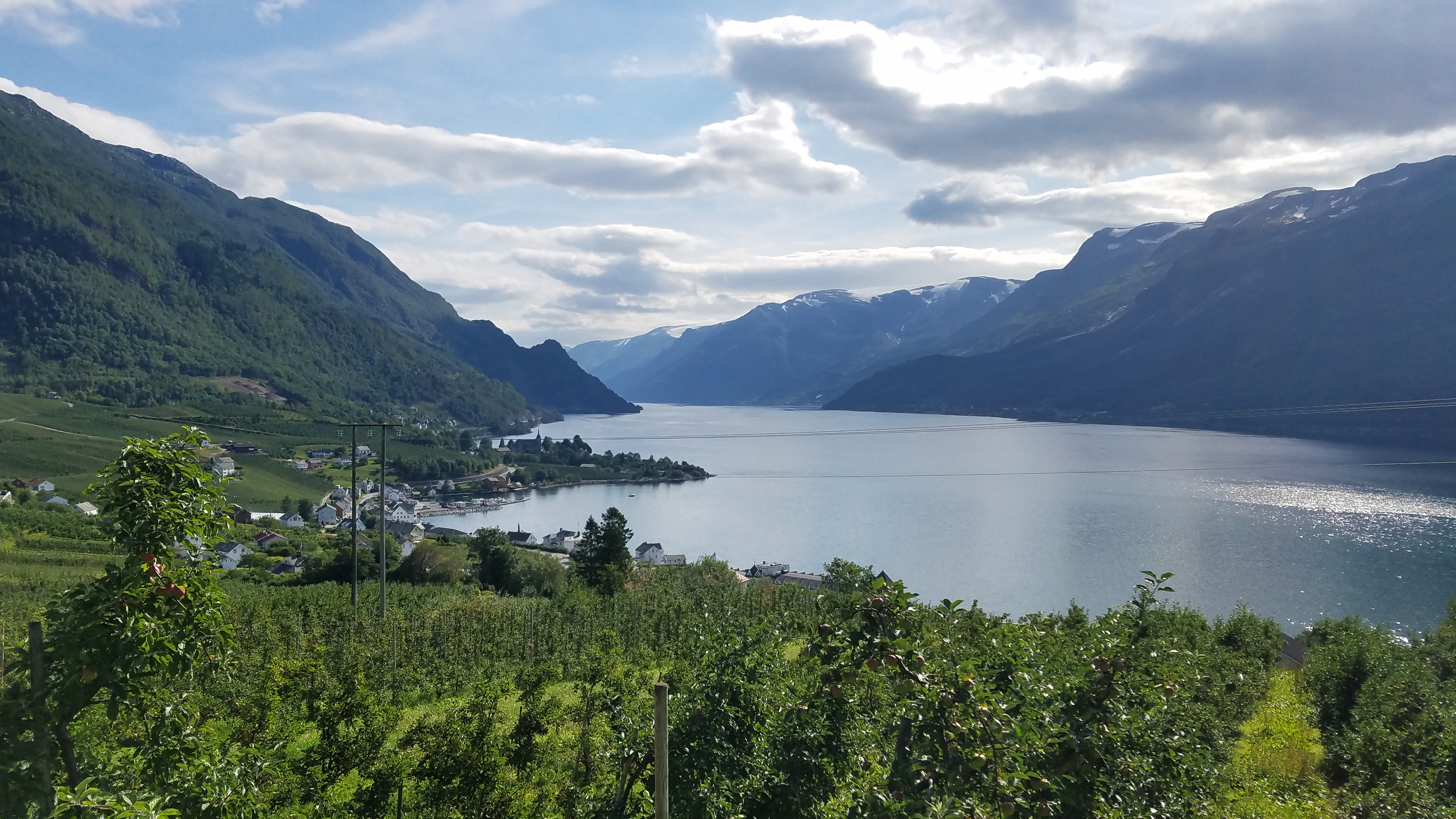
- View of Lofthus

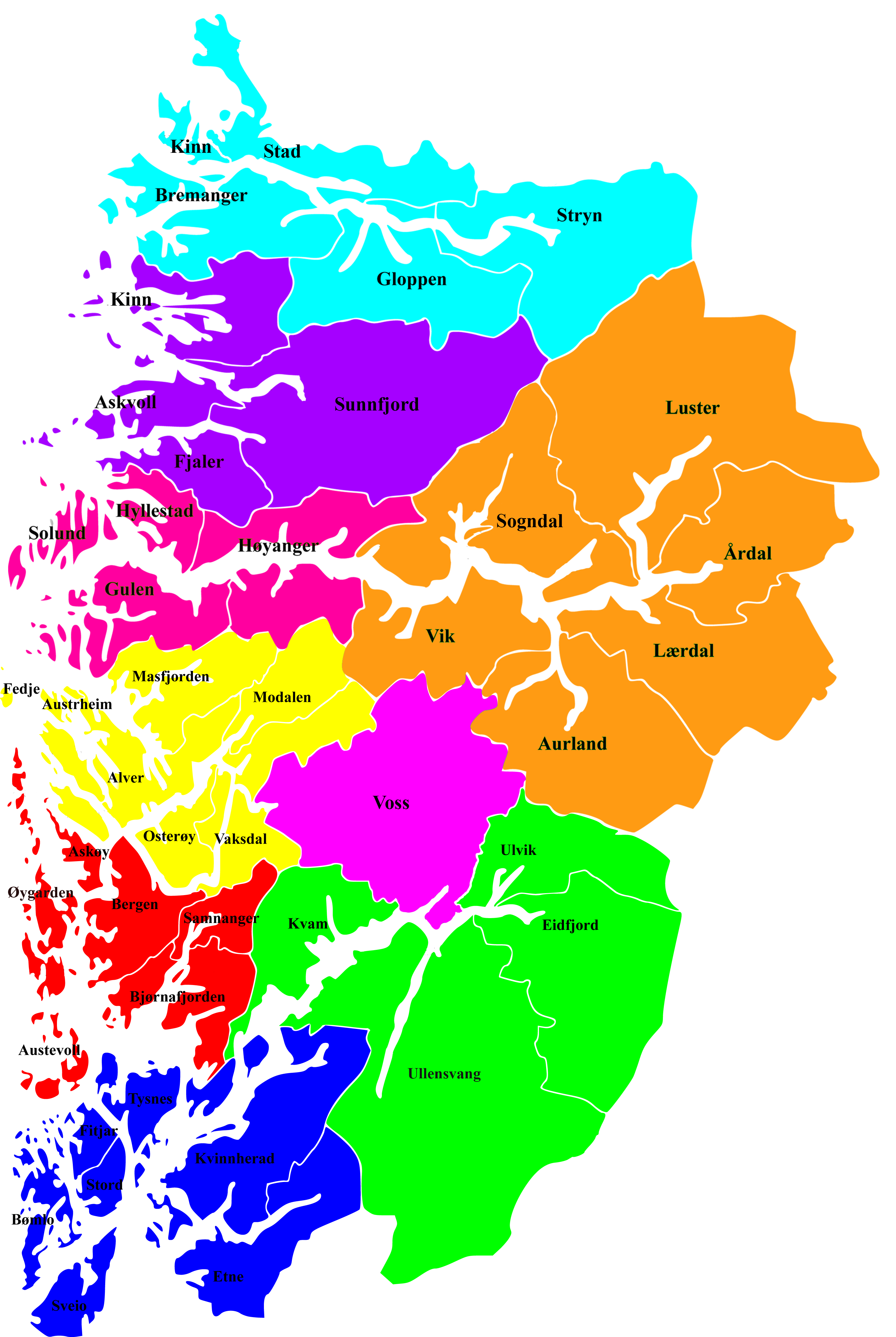
- Districts of Vestland: Nordfjord Sunnfjord Indre Sogn Ytre Sogn Nordhordland Midthordland Sunnhordland Hardanger Voss
- Coordinates: 60°20′N 6°30′E
- Country: Norway
- Region: Western Norway
- County: Vestland
- Largest settlement: Odda

Area
  - Total: 6,266 km^{2} (2,419 sq mi)

Population (2009)
  - Total: 22,810
  - Density: 3.640/km^{2} (9.428/sq mi)
- Demonym: Harding

Hardanger is a traditional district in Vestland county, Norway. The region is dominated by the Hardangerfjord and its inner branches of the Sørfjorden and the Eidfjorden. The district consists of Ullensvang Municipality, Eidfjord Municipality, Ulvik Municipality, and Kvam Municipality.

The area is dominated by the vast Hardangervidda plateau in the east and the large Folgefonna glacier on the central Folgefonna peninsula. The district was selected as the millennium site for the old Hordaland county.

In the early Viking Age, before Harald Fairhair, Hardanger was a petty kingdom with its capital at Kinsarvik.

== Etymology ==
The Old Norse form of the name was Harðangr. The first element is derived from the ethnonym hǫrðar, or from harðr meaning "hard" (referring to wind and weather). The last element is angr which means "tight fjord" (the name originally belonged to the fjord, now called Hardangerfjorden).

== Agriculture ==
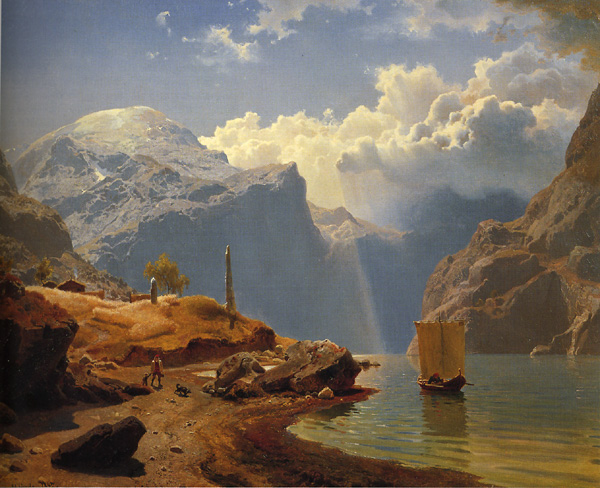
From Hardanger, a painting by Hans Gude, 1847

The region is one of Norway's most important sources of fruit and constitutes approximately 40% of the national fruit production, including apple, plum, pear, cherry and redcurrant. Apples have been cultivated in Hardanger since the 14th century, the agricultural experience brought by English monks who first arrived at Lyse Abbey in 1146. The climate, soil and seasonal conditions of the region are believed to be particularly beneficial to the growth of apples. In 2005, juice produced from Hardanger apples became Norway's third product to be granted protection of origin name, with applications pending for other regional produce.

In 2006, an Ulvik farmer and producer of sparkling cider, Nils Lekve of Hardanger Saft og Siderfabrikk, successfully navigated the narrow and complex directives of Norwegian alcohol laws, and completed a distribution agreement with monopoly alcoholic beverage outlet Vinmonopolet, making Hardanger Sider Sprudlande available for national sale by July 2006. Lekve's efforts earned him a top 3 finalist nomination for the Bygdeutviklingsprisen (English: Local community development award), awarded by Innovasjon Norge.

== Food and crafts ==
Hardanger embroidery is a type of whitework that takes its name from that region. It is made with geometric designs of kloster (blocks), "ships", diamonds, and other embroidery techniques. It is worked on Hardanger or linen fabric which has a "count" of 22 to 29 threads per inch. Traditionally it is worked on white fabric with white cotton thread but in recent years other colors and threads are popular. Norwegian bunads (Hardangerbunad, native costumes) from that region often feature this embroidery on the bottom of the white apron.

Hardanger also lends its name to the Hardanger fiddle which was originally produced there.

Krotekake is a type of lefse unique to the region.
