= List of Norwegian cheeses =

This is a list of cheeses from, or connected with, Norway.

== Brunost cheeses ==
Brunost or Mysost is a caramelized brown Norwegian whey cheese. Brunost (lit. 'brown cheese') is the commonly used name instead of the less-commonly used mysost (lit. 'whey cheese'). It is regarded as one of Norway's most iconic foodstuffs, and is considered an important part of Norwegian gastronomical and cultural identity and heritage. Brunost is made by boiling a mixture of milk, cream, and whey carefully for several hours so that the water evaporates. The heat turns the milk sugars into caramel, which gives the cheese its characteristic brown colour and sweetness. There are several varieties:

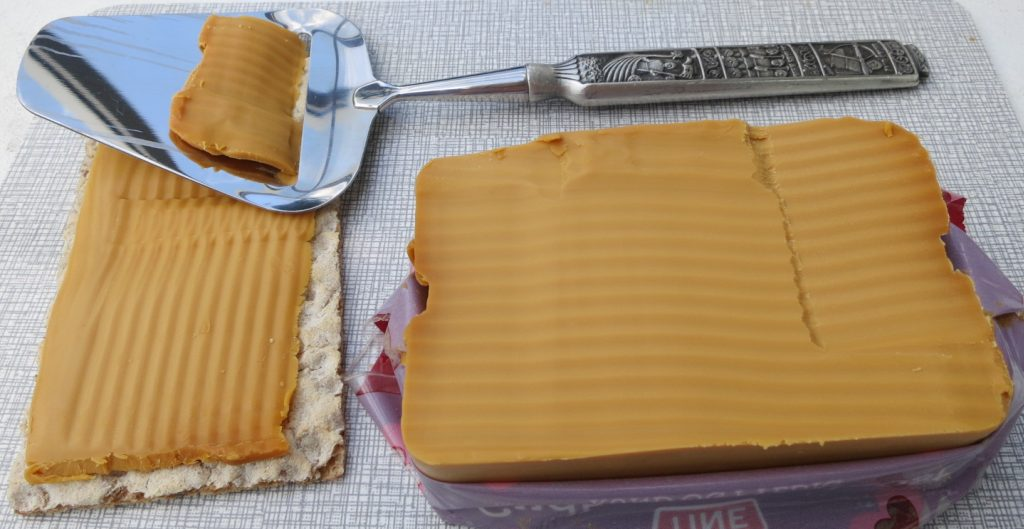
Brunost

- Fløtemysost, a type of brunost made from cow's milk
- Gudbrandsdalsost, a type of brunost made from goat milk and cow milk
- Geitost, a type of brunost made from whey, milk, and cream from goats
  - Ekte geitost (lit. 'true goat cheese'), a goat cheese containing only goat milk and whey
- Heidal cheese, a dark brown brunost from Heidal with a decorative pattern molded on the cheese block
- Misværost, a very light brunost goat cheese that is browned very little, giving it a light, almost yellow color, and a very mild taste
- Primost, a light brown cheese made from cow's milk which has a soft spreadable texture

== Norwegian cheeses ==
There are also many other cheeses (non-brunost) from Norway.

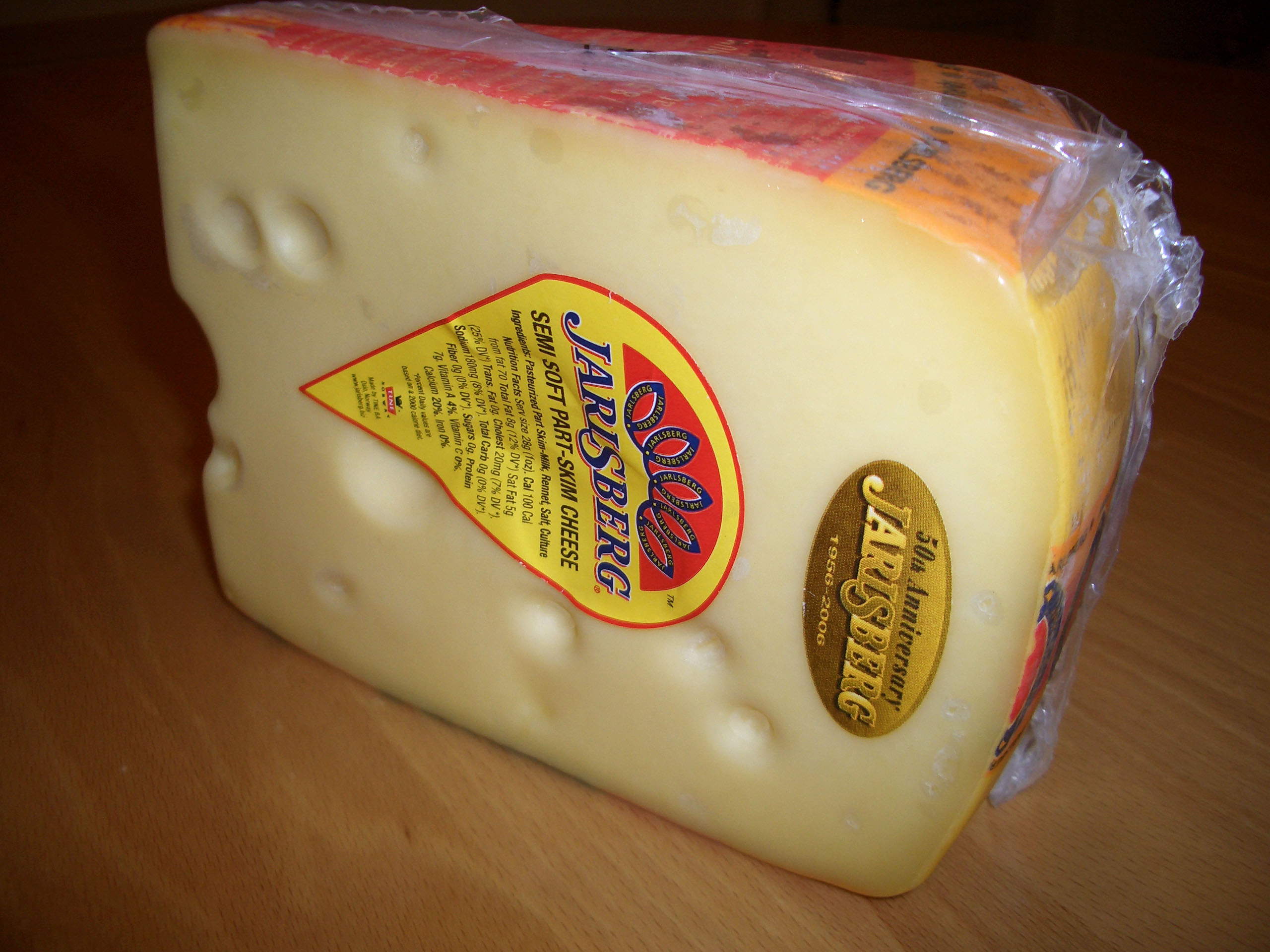
Jarlsberg cheese

- Gamalost (lit. 'old cheese'), a pungent traditional Norwegian cheese
- Jarlsberg cheese, a mild cheese made from cow's-milk, with large, regular eyes, originating from Jarlsberg, Norway
- Kraftkar, a blue cheese from Tingvoll Municipality in Nordmøre in Western Norway, made from unskimmed cow's milk and cream, with injected culture of the mold Penicillium roqueforti
- Kvarg, a type of fresh dairy product made by warming soured milk until the desired amount of curdling is achieved, and then straining it
- Normanna, a solid blue cheese with an aromatic and powerful taste. Normanna is sliceable when it is cold, and spreadable when it is temperate
- Norvegia, a cow's milk cheese similar to Gouda that has a mild taste and melts easily
- Norzola, a blue cheese with a supple, almost buttery consistency and aromatic and full-bodied taste
- Nøkkelost, a semi-hard, yellow, cow's milk cheese that is flavoured with cumin and cloves. It is made in wheels or blocks and has a maturation period of three months
- Pultost, a soft, mature sour milk cheese flavored with caraway seeds
- Ridderost, a smear-ripened cheese with soft and supple consistency
- Selbu blå, a versatile blue cheese, that goes well on bread or on its own
- Skjørost, a fresh curd of sour skim milk
- Snøfrisk, a soft, spreadable goat cheese that comes in several flavours, including original, juniper berry, dill, and forest mushrooms
- Søst, a semi-solid cheese that has a round, sweet, caramel-like taste and it is easily cuttable
