= Tinfos =

Norwegian holding company

- Type: Private
- Industry: Metal, Renewable energy industry
- Founded: 1894
- Headquarters: Notodden, Norway
- Key people: Kjetil Holta
- Products: Ferroalloys, Pig Iron and energy
- Revenue: ▲NOK 6000 million (in 2006)
- Number of employees: 500
- Website: http://www.tinfos. no/

Tinfos is a private Norwegian holding company. Its roots dates back to 1875, and has today the head office in Oslo, Norway. The firm is one of the oldest companies in its field of activity in Europe. Its main products are silicomanganese, High Purity Pig Iron and titanium dioxide. The company is structured in 4 different divisions. Tinfos AS was sold 15 April 2008 to the French-based manganese company Eramet. In 2009, Eramet sold the international unit of Tinfos to Holta Invest AS, a Norwegian investment company.

== Tinfos Jernverk ==
Tinfos Jernverk produces silicomanganese, an alloy used for all steel. The company is the world leader in the production of low carbon silicomanganese for primarily stainless steel. The plant is located in Kvinesdal Municipality, Norway.

== Tinfos Titan and Iron ==
Tinfos Titan and Iron (TTI) used to produce titanium dioxide slag for the pigment industry and high quality Pig Iron for the foundry industry at the plant in Tyssedal, Norway. The raw material used in the process is ilmenite. TTI was sold in 2008 to Eramet. In 2021 an acquisition attempt was abandoned by Tronox, in part due to the UK CMA investigating the sale. As Tronox intended to use the TTI materials internally, this created a potential monopoly for the remaining supplier of chloride-grade titanium slag in the UK and Europe.

== Energy ==
Tinfos is generating energy for its own consumption through hydropower plants in Tyssedal and in Notodden. It is also recovering energy through the thermal power plant in Kvinesdal. The division also promotes small scale turnkey power plants.

== Tinfos Nizi ==
Tinfos Nizi now Nizi International is responsible for the worldwide trading operations with head offices in Luxembourg.

== See also ==
- Eramet Titanium & Iron
