= Brelett =

Norwegian brand of margarine

- Product type: Margarine
- Current owner: Fjordland
- Country: Norway
- Markets: Norway
- Previous owners: 1987 - Tine; 1995 - Fjordland
- Website: https://web.archive.org/web/20080215094238/http://www.fjordland.no/fjordland/page?id=4

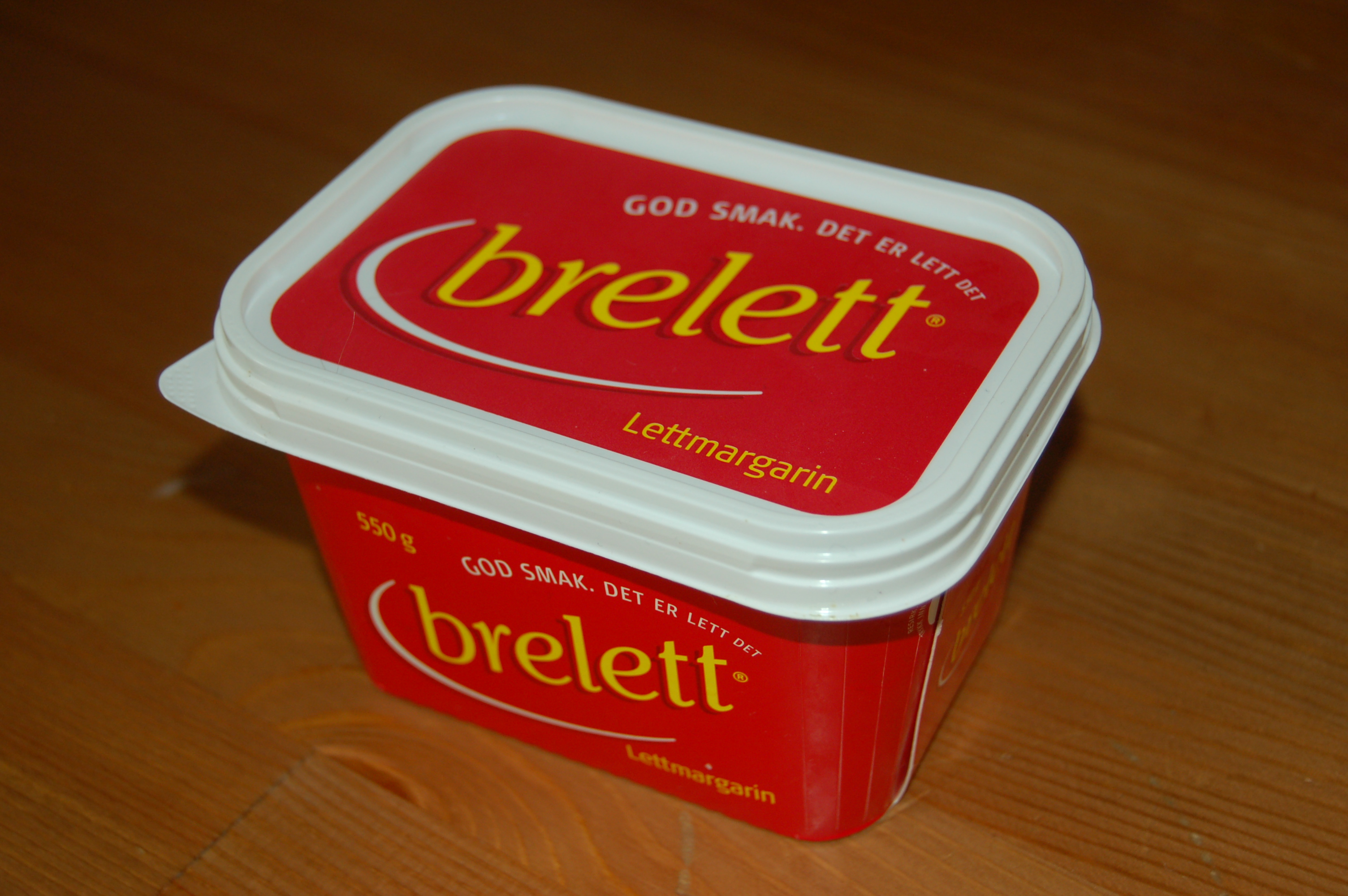
Brelett 550g package

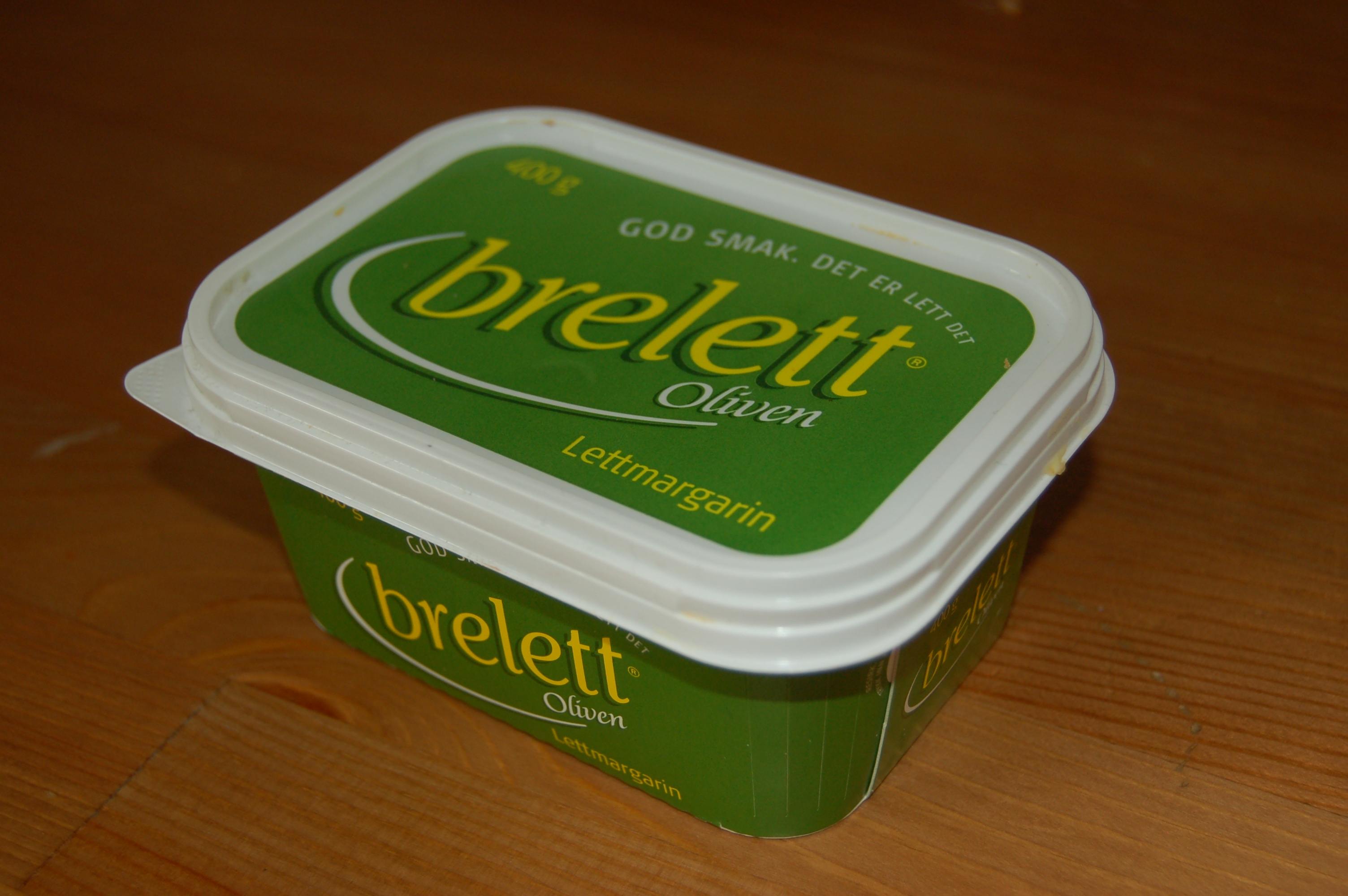
Brelett olive margarine

Brelett is a Norwegian brand of margarine produced by Fjordland. It has a market share of 72% in the domestic light margarine category. The margarine contains both milk and vegetable fats, giving it a more buttery taste than pure margarine. In 2006, 10,347,395 packages of Brelett were sold.

The product was launched by the cooperative dairy Tine in 1987, though it was transferred to Fjordland in 1995. Brelett is sold in three sizes: 250 g, 400 g and 550 g. In addition, 250 g packages are available with olive and yogurt based Brelett.
