= Fiordland (disambiguation) =

Fiordland is a geographic region of New Zealand.

Fiordland may also refer to:

== Places ==
- Fiordland National Park, in Fiordland region of New Zealand
- Fiordland College, a school in Te Anau, New Zealand
- Fiordland Conservancy, a provincial park in British Columbia, Canada

== Animal species ==
Animal species named after the Fiordland region of New Zealand:

- Fiordland brotula (Fiordichthys slartibartfasti)
- Fiordland penguin (Eudyptes pachyrhynchus)
- Fiordland skink (Oligosoma acrinasum)
- Fiordlandia, a genus in the family Hydractiniidae

== See also ==
- Fjordland, a Norwegian food manufacturer
- Fjord (disambiguation)
