= Sundnes Brenneri =

Norwegian potato processing plant and distillery

HOFF Sundnes Brenneri
- Type: Subsidiary
- Industry: Food manufacturing
- Founded: 1844
- Headquarters: Oslo, Norway
- Area served: Norway
- Products: Akvavit; Potato chips Potato flour
- Number of employees: 52 (2007)
- Parent: HOFF Norske Potetindustrier
- Website: www.hoff.no

Sundnes Brenneri is a Norwegian potato processing plant and distillery located in Inderøy Municipality. It produces akvavit, potato chips, potato starch flour and mashed potatoes. The plant was started in 1844, four years before private distillation was banned. It is part of the HOFF Norske Potetindustrier agricultural cooperative.

The akvavit production was covered by the import of caraway from Eastern Europe until 1989 when farmers in Inderøy started caraway production. Today half a square kilometer of caraway is produced in the municipality. The potato for the akvavit has always been locally produced.

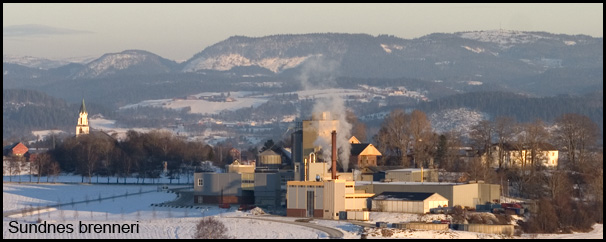
The plant
