= Drammens Is =

Norwegian ice cream company

Drammens Is AS
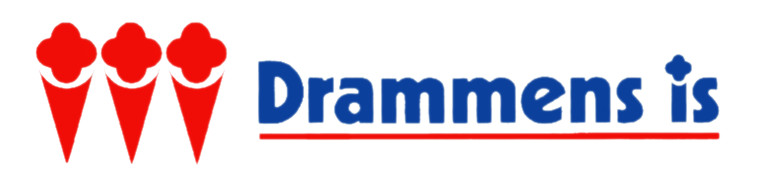

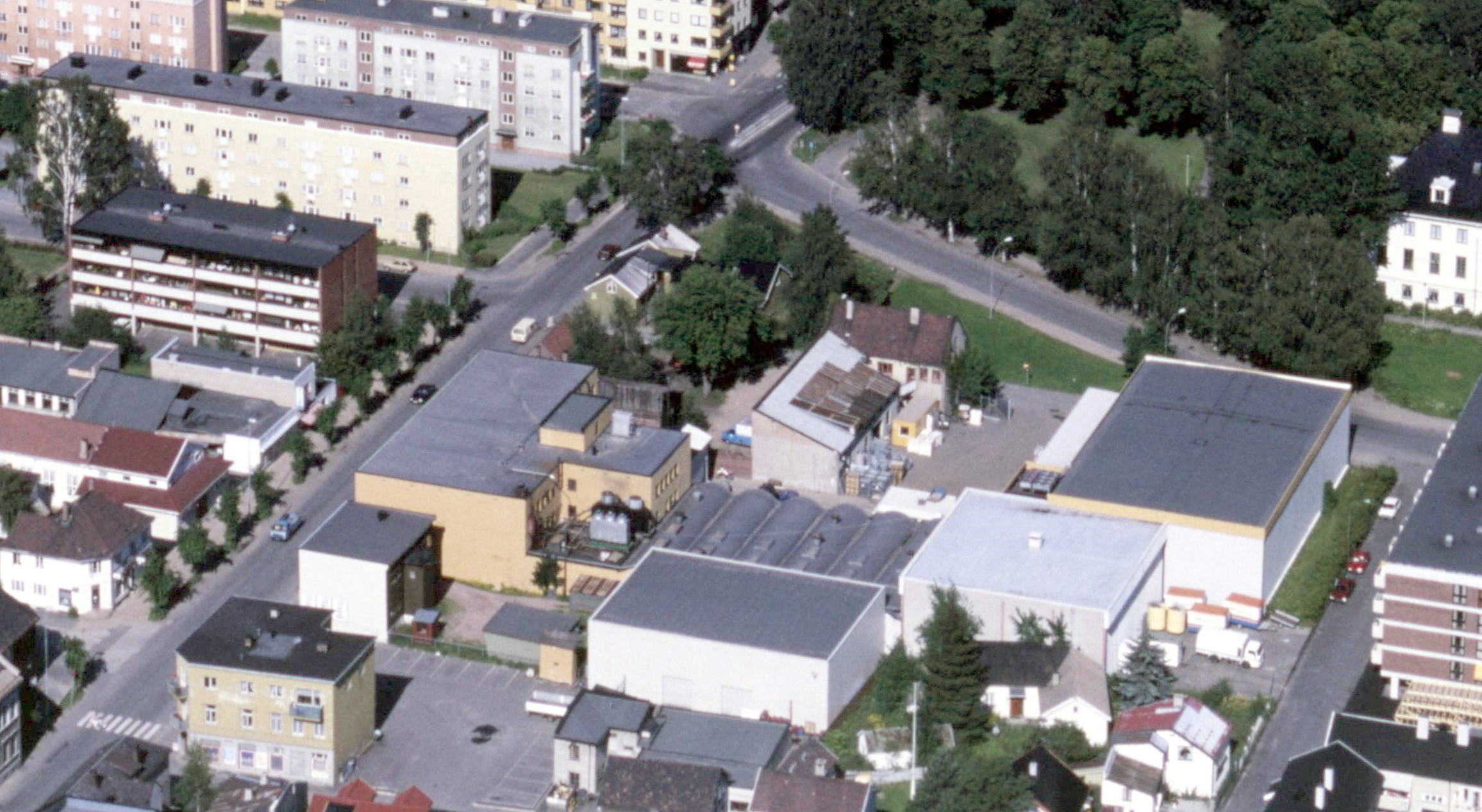
- Drammens Is (1985); Credit: Bjørn Østrem
- Industry: Food manufacturing
- Founded: 1937
- Defunct: 2005
- Fate: Purchase
- Successor: Nestlé
- Headquarters: Drammen, Norway
- Products: Ice cream

Drammens Is is a former ice cream manufacturer based in Drammen, Norway.

Drammens Is was founded in 1937. Among the brands made by Drammens Is were Gullkrone, Kjempe-Yes, Hip, Hawaii, Mr. Yankee, Break, Luksuspinne, Kjempe-Nuggi, Sjokoladepinne, Banansplit, Twin, Kokosboller and På Minuttet. Drammens purchased the company Joker Is in 1991.

On 4 June 1997, a car bomb exploded outside a Bandidos MC clubhouse in Drammen as a part of the Nordic Biker War. The Drammen factory was completely destroyed after a fire due to the bombing. Soon afterward the company was bought by Nestlé who took over the rights to the brands and made an agreement with Diplom-Is, a Norwegian ice cream manufacturer regarding production and distribution of Drammens Is products.

After large losses in the Norwegian ice cream market, Nestlé closed down its Norwegian ice cream division in 2005. At the same time, Diplom-Is AS took over the marketing and distribution of Nestlé's international ice cream brands in Norway while the former Drammens Is brands disappeared from the marketplace.
