= Frogner-Is =

Former Norwegian ice cream maker

- Formerly: Nora Is – Frogner Is
- Company type: Aksjeselskap
- Industry: Food
- Founded: 1928
- Founder: Richard Vatn
- Defunct: 1965
- Fate: Ice cream operation sold to Fellesmeieriene
- Headquarters: Oslo, Norway
- Products: Ice cream

Frogner-Is was a Norwegian ice cream maker in Oslo, founded in 1928 by Richard Vatn, a former dairy manager. The business started at Frogner and moved in 1936 to a new factory at Skøyen, and it was one of many ice cream brands of the period, marketing products such as the Polarpinne ice lolly under a twin-penguin logo.

Around 1950 Nora Fabrikker became an important partner, and from 1954 the factory was known as Nora Is – Frogner Is. Facing growing competition from the dairies' Diplom-Is, Nora ended ice cream production in 1965 and sold the operation to Fellesmeieriene, bringing Frogner-Is to an end.
