= Fjord (disambiguation) =

A fjord (or fiord) a long, narrow inlet with steep sides or cliffs, created by a glacier.

Fjord may also refer to:

== Places ==
- Fjord City, an urban renewal project for the waterfront of Oslo, Norway
- Fjord Municipality, a municipality in Møre og Romsdal county, Norway
- Fjord-lake, a lake in Russia named after fjords (aka Lake Fiordovoye)

== Other ==
- Fjord horse, a Norwegian horse breed
- Fjord Line, a Norwegian ferry operator
- Fjords (board game), a tile-based German-style board game
- Fjord (film), a 2026 film
- Fjord, a half-orc warlock / paladin in the D&D web series Critical Role

== See also ==
- Fiordland (disambiguation)
- Fjard, an inlet with a shallower profile than a fjord
- Fjord1, a Norwegian transport conglomerate
- Fjordgård, a village Troms county, Norway
- Fjordland, a Norwegian food manufacturer
