= Atlungstad Distillery =

Historical distillery in Norway

Coordinates: 60°45′33″N 11°04′47″E

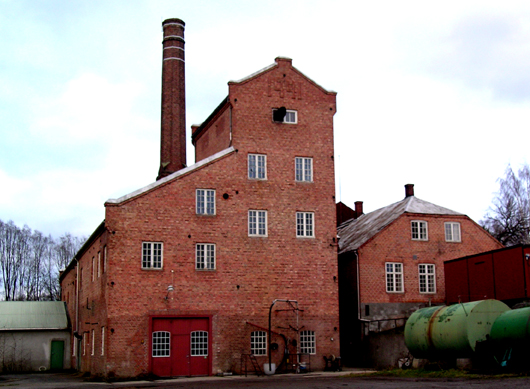
Atlungstad Distillery

The Atlungstad Distillery (Norwegian: Atlungstad Brenneri) is a distillery in Stange Municipality in Innlandet county, Norway. It was established in 1855 by a group of farmers. Regular distillation was discontinued in 2000, but trial runs were later carried out. In 2012, the distillery was added to the Norwegian Directorate for Cultural Heritage list of priority technical and industrial cultural heritage, after which NOK 7 million was allocated to restore the distillery to its former condition. An additional NOK 4.7 million was allocated for the distillery in 2017. It has been owned by the company Atlungstad Brenneri AS since 2011. In October 2013, the owners signed a cooperation agreement with the Arcus company that they would restart regular production of akvavit at the Atlungstad Distillery. The distillery is open for tours in the summer.

== History ==
The Atlungstad Distillery was established in 1855, when a number of farmers gathered together in a cooperative society, and it replaced several smaller distilleries in the area. Because water was important for many of the distillery processes, it was built at the mouth of Fjetre Creek (Fjetrebekken), where it empties into Mjøsa. The buildings were built of red brick, which is typical of the industrial architecture of the late 1800s, and it was also equipped with a smithy and a barn. Characteristic features of the structure are its 15-meter (49 ft) high column still and the 30-meter (98 ft) high factory chimney. The buildings contain potato bins, alcohol and distillation equipment, and akvavit storage. The distillery burned in 1864, but it was rebuilt two years later within the same walls. It was expanded in 1911, and in 1954 a new seed-cleaning facility was built.

In 1920, the company Atlungstad Finspritfabrik (Atlungstad Neutral Spirits) was dissolved, and the stocks of distillates were distributed to the shareholders. A new company, Stange Brandenderi (Stange Distilling), was established a few days later. In 1925, the retailer Vinmonopolet took over distillation of neutral spirits, and a year later the distilling company was given the name Stange Brænderi & Frøforretning (Stange Distilling & Seed Company). A year later it was merged with the distilleries in Tangen and Romedal to form Hedmark Frøforretning og Brenneri (Hedmark Seed Company and Distillery). In 1995 this company was purchased by HOFF Norske Potetindustrier.

Regular distillation at the Atlungstad Distillery was discontinued in 2000, and it was converted into a reserve distillery that operated on an as-needed basis. This activity was also discontinued in 2008. In 2011, the distillery was acquired by Atlungstad Brenneri AS, which started test distillation that fall. In 2013, the company signed an agreement with Arcus to once again produce akvavit on a regular basis.
