= Ole Martin Ystgaard =

- Born: 21 June 1910; Sparbu, Norway
- Died: 19 September 1970 (aged 60)
- Occupation: Dairy leader
- Employer: Norwegian College of Agriculture
- Known for: Jarlsberg cheese
- Father: Hans Ystgaard

Ole Martin Ystgaard (21 June 1910 – 19 September 1970) was a Norwegian dairy leader. He was born in Sparbu, a son of farmer and politician Hans Ystgaard and Kathrine Birgitte Steinfjord. He married nurse Elsa Johanne Skaalvik in 1946. He was appointed professor at the Norwegian College of Agriculture from 1951. Among his contributions is the development of the new cheese type called Jarlsberg cheese.
