= Norwegian Museum of Hydropower and Industry =

Museum in Odda, Norway

Coordinates: 60°07′09″N 006°33′23″E

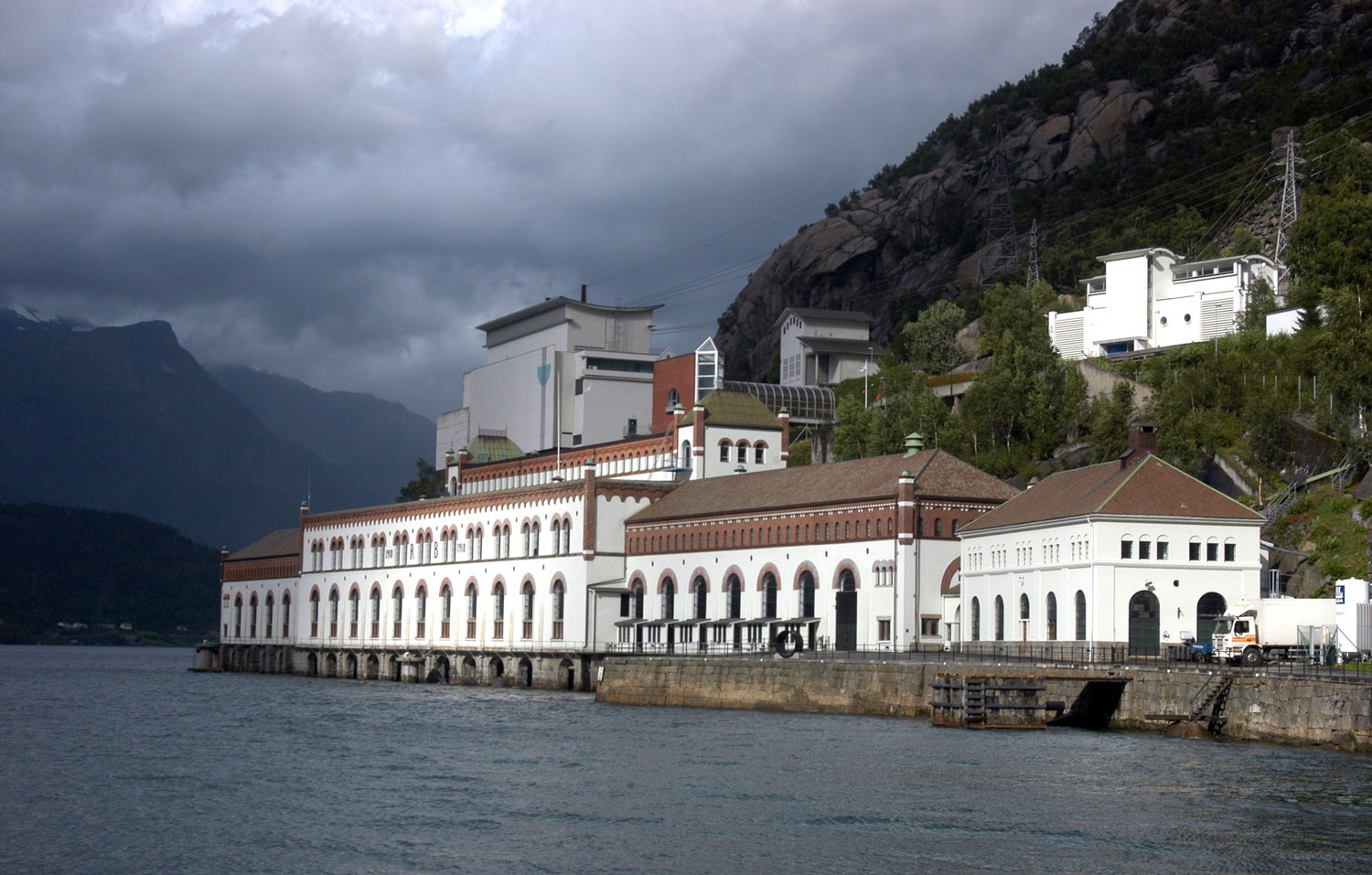
Tysseldal power station

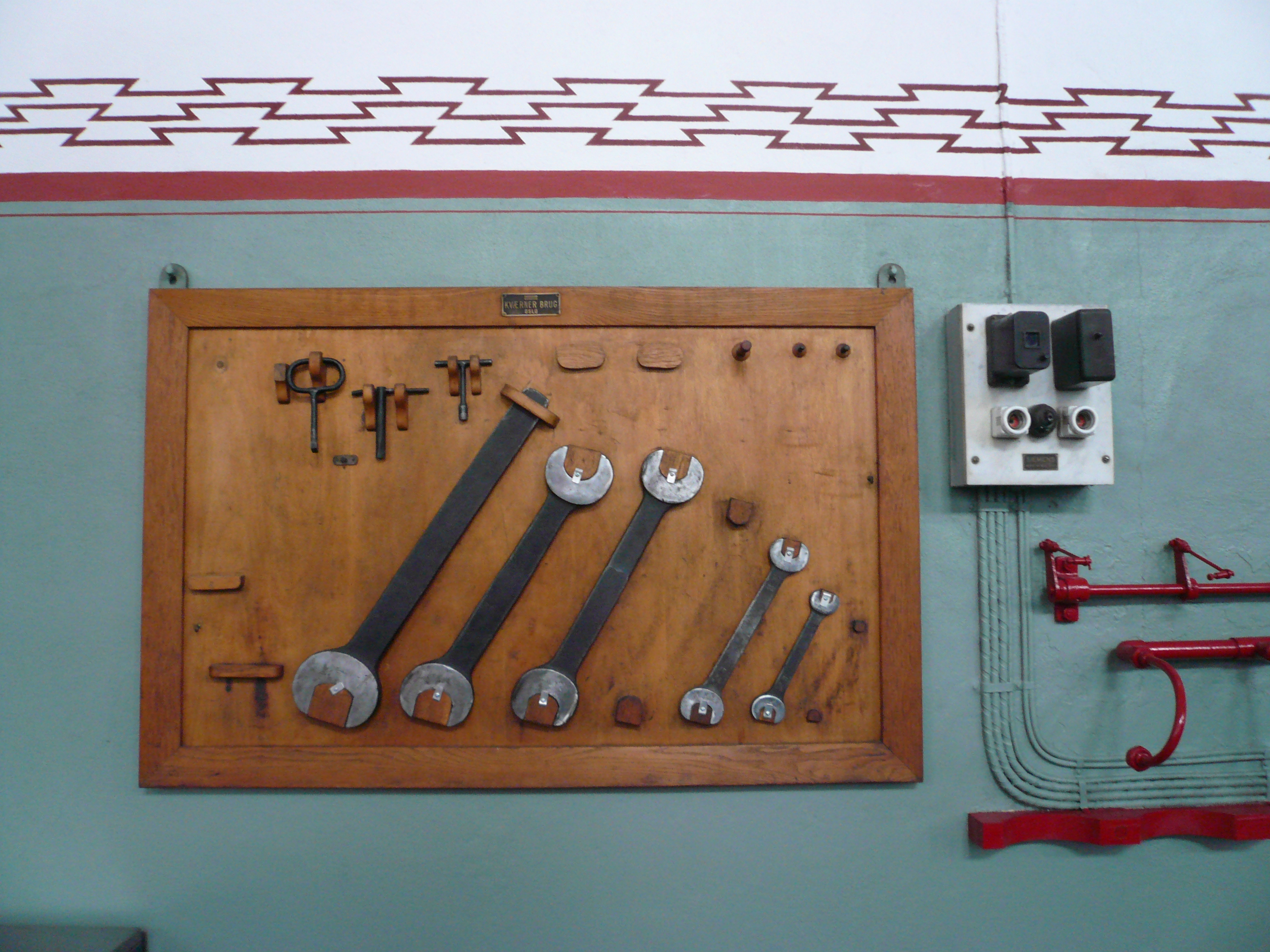
Display of tools in the turbine hall

The Norwegian Museum of Hydropower and Industry (Norwegian: Norsk Vasskraft- og Industristadmuseum) is a cultural history museum in the town of Odda in Vestland county, Norway. The museum is located in the village of Tyssedal. The museum is dedicated to the industrial history of Odda and Tyssedal, and more generally to history related to rivers and water, hydropower production, electricity, power intensive industry and its society.

A main attraction is the power station Tysso I, which was designed by architect Thorvald Astrup (1876–1940) and constructed between 1906 and 1918. The station contains machinery and control room equipment from the entire period of operation, 1908–1989. In 2000 Tyssedal power plant – including Tysso I, pipelines, distribution pool and watchman's house at Lilletopp, and intake pool and valve house at Vetlevann – was protected for posterity by the Norwegian Directorate for Cultural Heritage. During the following years the power plant went through extensive restoration.

Close to the power station is the former administration building for AS Tyssefaldene, the power generation company that owns and operates the hydropower plant. Today the building houses the museum's exhibitions, library, archives, photo and audio collections, as well as an auditorium. Further upstream it is possible to visit the installations at Lilletopp, Vetlevann and the Ringedals Dam. Three old workmen's houses in Odda and a small former hydrologic research station at the glacier Folgefonna are also part of the museum. A via ferrata has been built that allows safe climbing along the very steep pipeline.
