= Tyssedal Hydroelectric Power Station =

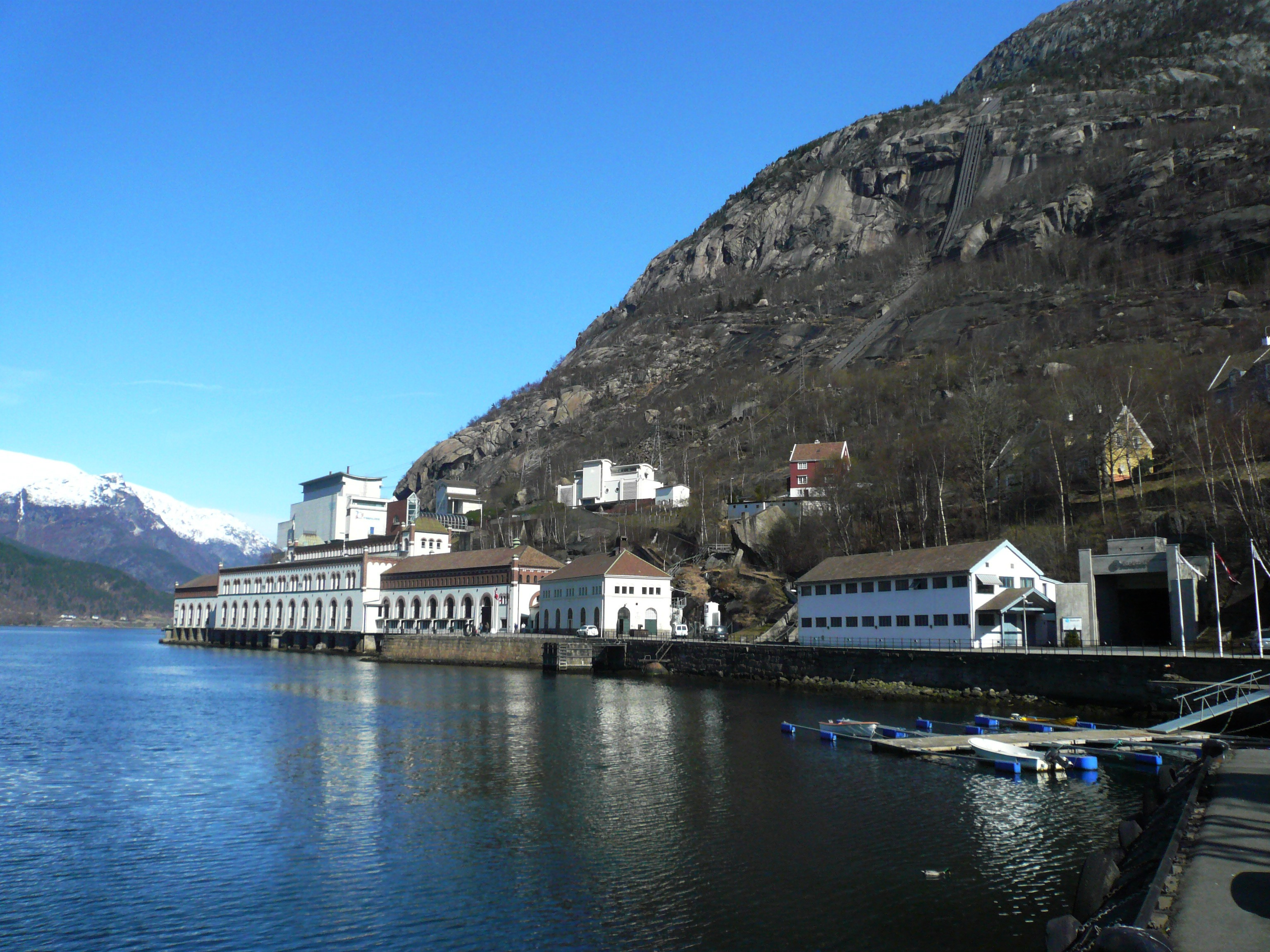
- Tyssedal kraftverk
- Interactive map of Tyssedal Hydroelectric Power Station
- Official name: Tyssedal kraftverk
- Country: Norway
- Location: Tyssedal
- Coordinates: 60°07′17″N 6°33′20″E
- Status: Museum
- Opening date: 1906
- Demolition date: 1989
- Owner: Tyssefaldene (-1989)

Reservoir
- Total capacity: 426×10^{6} m^{3} (0.426 km^{3})

Power Station
- Hydraulic head: 400 m
- Installed capacity: 100 MW
- Capacity factor: 80.0%
- Annual generation: 700 GW·h

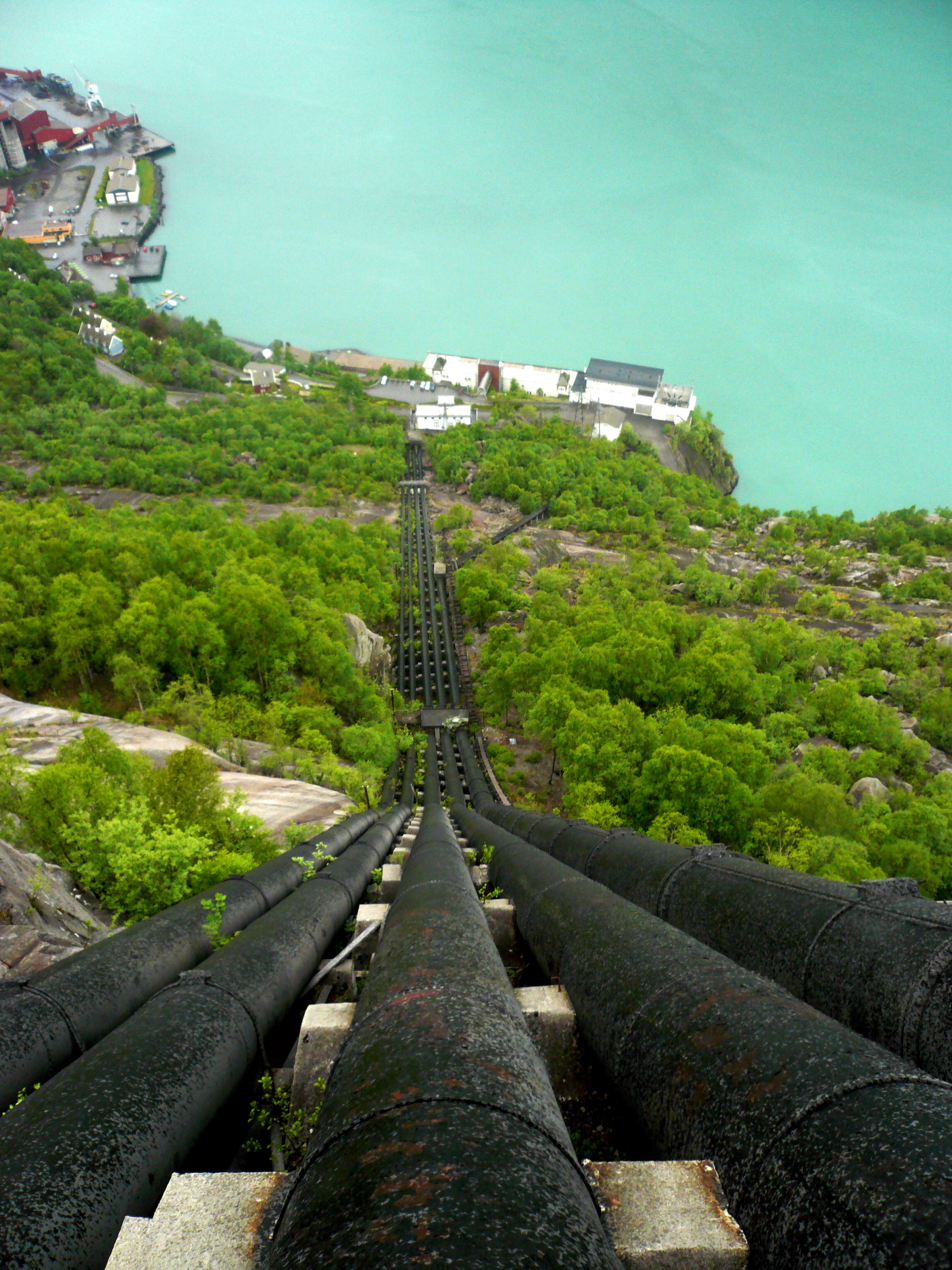
The five penstocks

The Tyssedal Power Station (Norwegian: Tyssedal kraftanlegg) is a hydroelectric power station and museum located in Tyssedal in Ullensvang Municipality in Vestland county, Norway. The station was designed by architect Thorvald Astrup. It started production in 1906 and operated at a combined installed capacity of 100 megawatts (130,000 hp) from 1918, with an average annual production of 700 gigawatt-hours (2,500 TJ). The plant was protected by the Norwegian Directorate for Cultural Heritage in 2000, and is part of the Norwegian Museum of Hydropower and Industry. The power station was added to the list of priority technical and industrial cultural heritage by the Norwegian Directorate for Cultural Heritage.

It is an anchor point of the European Route of Industrial Heritage (ERIH).
