= Technical and Industrial Cultural Heritage in Norway =

Conservation program in Norway

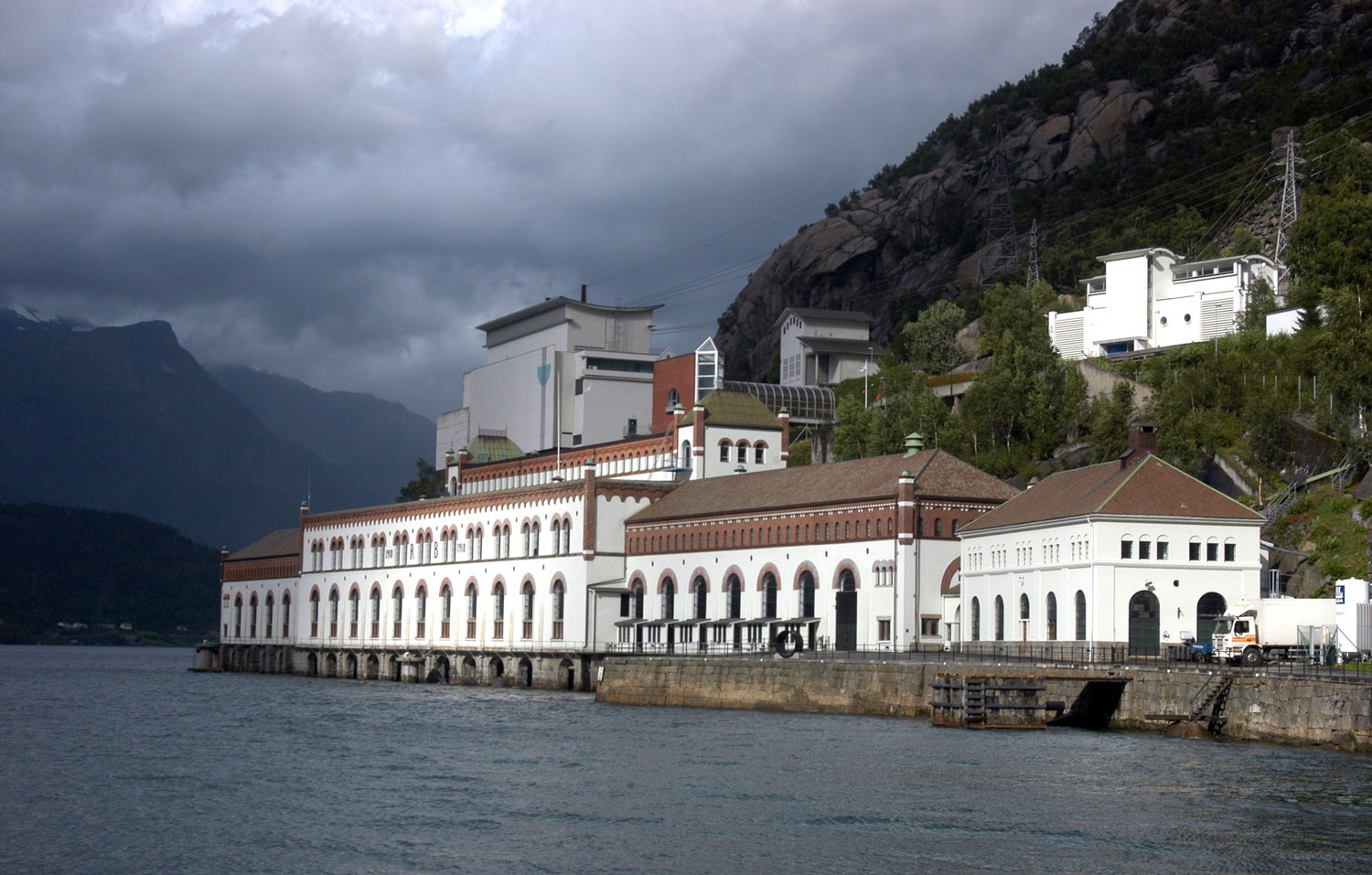
Tyssedal Hydroelectric Power Station

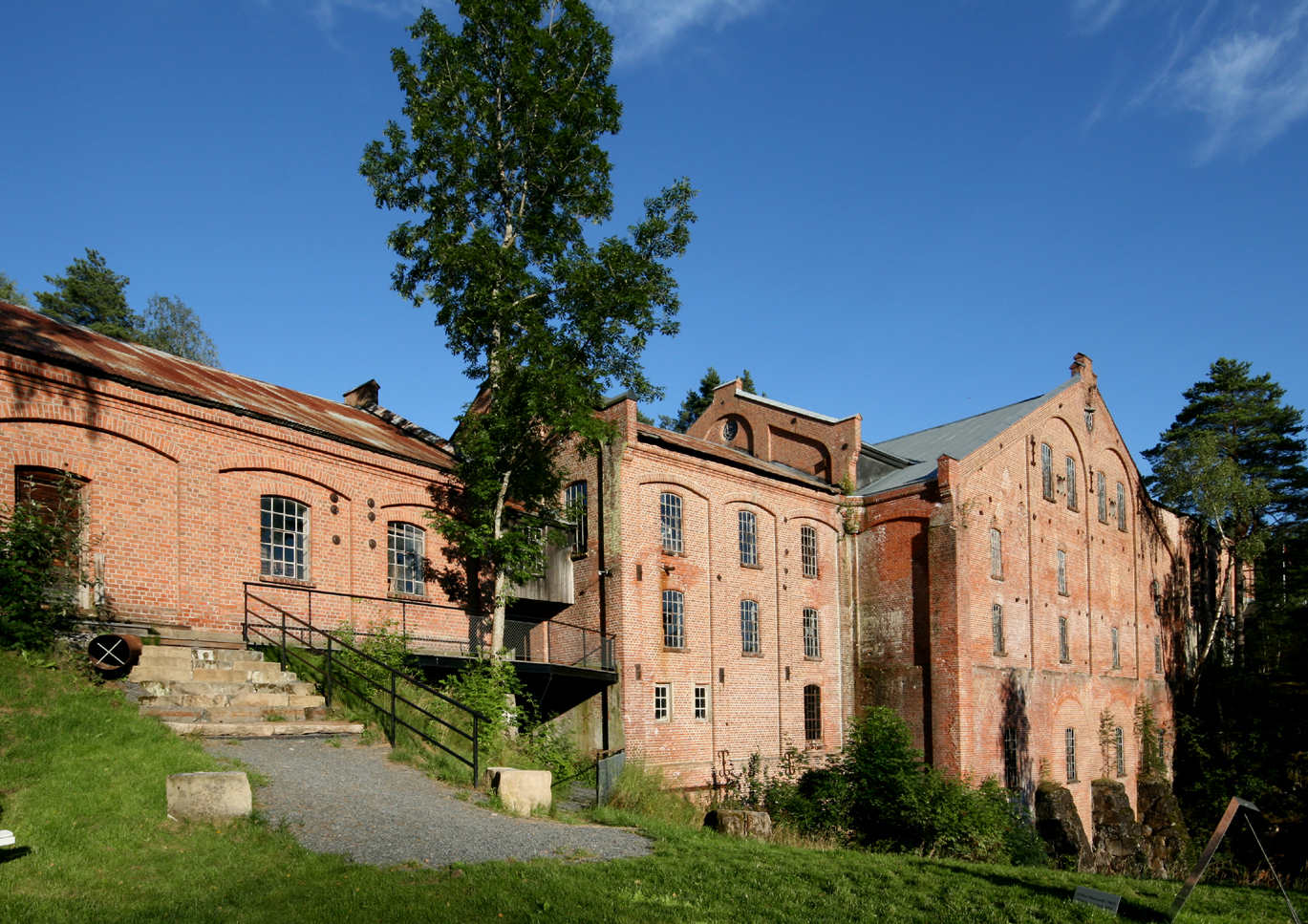
Kistefos Wood Pulp Mill

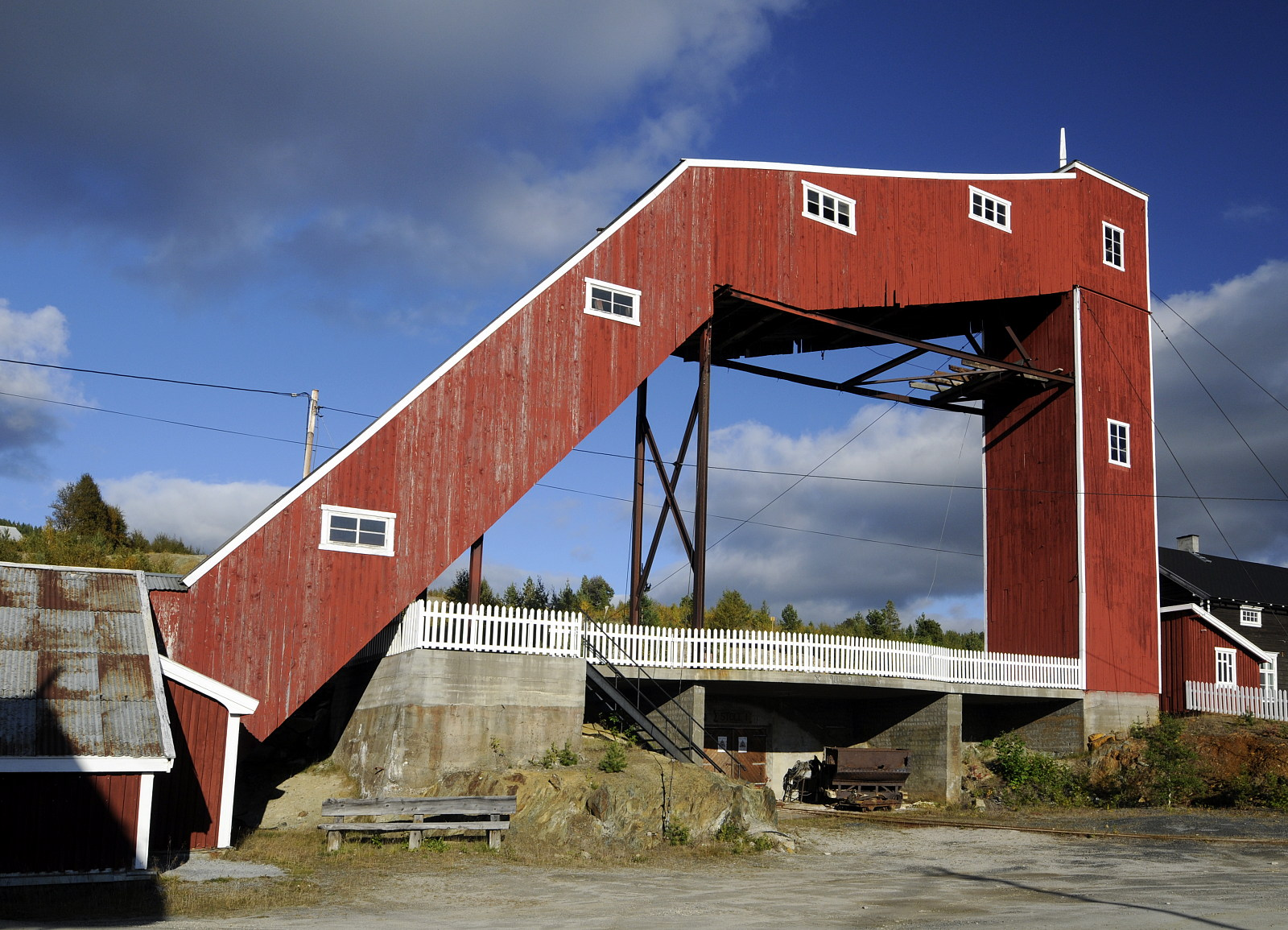
Folldal Mines

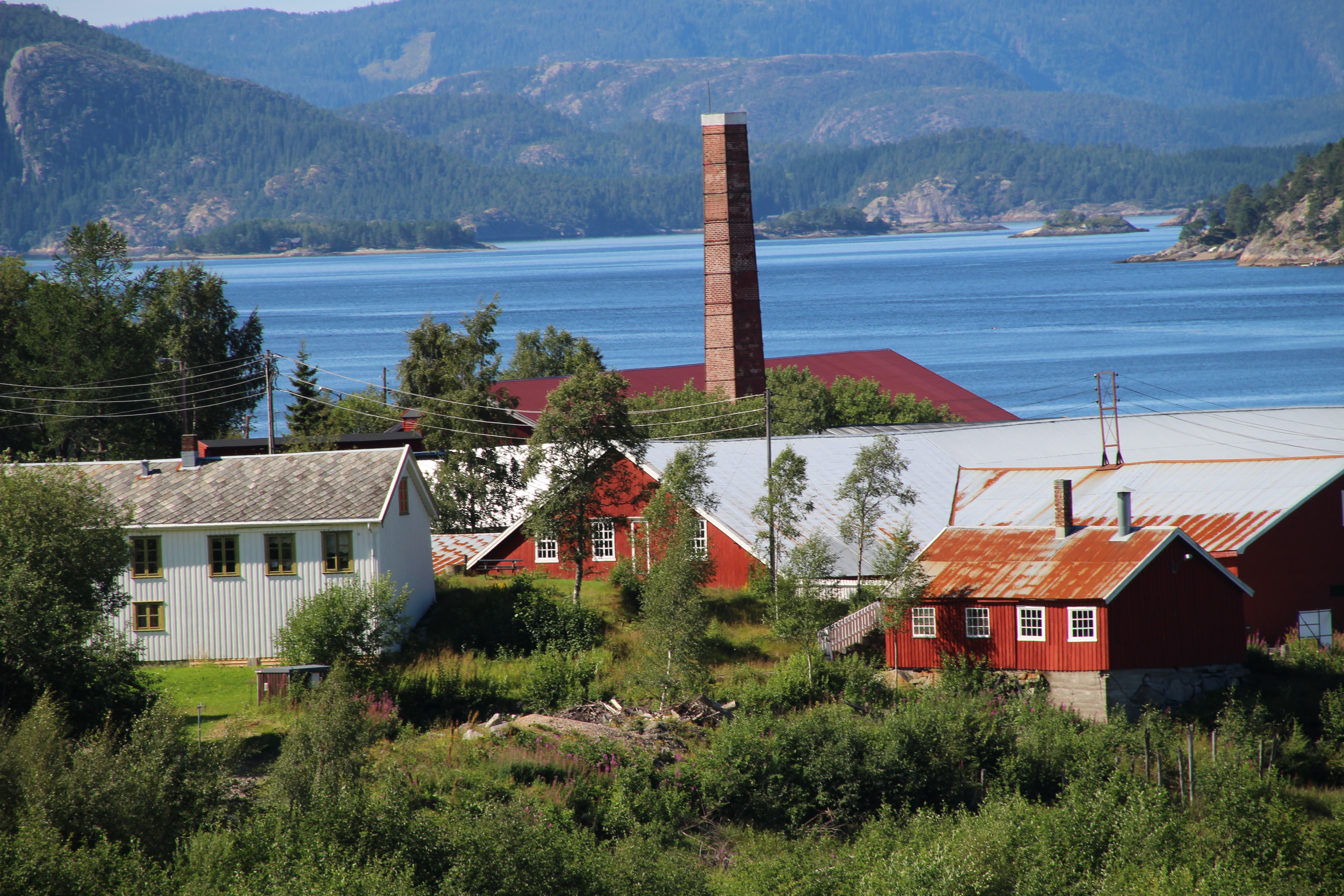
Spillum Sawmill and Planing, Norwegian Sawmill Museum

Technical and Industrial Cultural Heritage in Norway encompasses discontinued industrial and other facilities with great historical and architectural value. It is one of the ten conservation programs for the Norwegian Directorate for Cultural Heritage, which seeks to refurbish and preserve a representative range of facilities linked to Norway's most important industrial routes, which has had a significant impact on local business history.

== Directorate for Cultural Heritage priority list ==
The Norwegian Directorate for Cultural Heritage list of priority technical and industrial cultural heritage comprises 15 facilities:

- Atlungstad Distillery
- Bredalsholmen Shipyards
- Bratteklev Shipyard
- Fetsund Booms
- Folldal Mines
- Halden Canal
- Kistefos Wood Pulp Mill
- Klevfos Cellulose and Paper Factory
- Neptune Herring Oil Factory
- Næs Ironworks
- Odda Smelting Plant
- Rjukan Line
- Salhus Knitting Mill
- Sjølingstad Woolen Mill
- Spillum Sawmill and Planing
- Tyssedal Hydroelectric Power Station
