= Anne Hov =

Norwegian cheesemaker

- Born: c. 1846; Oppland, Norway
- Died: c. 1935; Oppland, Norway
- Spouse: Tor Olsen Hov
- Awards: King's Medal of Merit in silver

Anne Hov (c. 1846–c. 1935) was a Norwegian farm wife from Gudbrandsdalen. She has been credited with developing the modern version of the cheese brunost.

== Biography ==
Anne Olsdatter, the daughter of Ola Kvålen and Kari Olsdatter, was raised on the Solbrå (Solbråsetra) farm in the parish of Nord-Fron in the valley of Gudbrandsdalen in Christians amt (county).

Traditionally brunost was made on farms throughout Norway by boiling whey without the addition of milk or cream. This became a sugar rich, lean product. While working at a mountain farm near Gålå during 1863, Hov came up with the idea of adding cream to cow-milk whey and to boil it down in an iron pot until the fluid content was reduced, creating a firmer, fatty, more cheese-like product. She originally called it Feitost ("Fat Cheese"). The product immediately caught on, and was soon commonly produced and consumed in the area. The name was later changed into Fløtemysost ("Cream Whey Cheese") and this variety is currently a popular type of cheese.

In the latter half of the 1800s, Gudbrandsdalen was suffering economically due to falling profits from grain and butter sales.

When Anne Hov married Tor Olsen Hov and moved to Rusthage (Rusthågå) in Nord-Fron Municipality, she started larger-scale cheese production and invented a variety where she added goat's milk to the mix for a more pronounced taste. Hov’s neighbors admired what they called her “blend”, and the local trader Ole Kongsli liked it so much he thought there might be a market for the product in Oslo. Ole Kongsli started exporting it to his business contacts in Oslo under the name Gudbrandsdalsost ("Gudbrandsdal Cheese"), and it became so successful that it contributed significantly to the economy of the region, thus helping Gudbrandsdalen out of recession.

In 1933, aged 87, Hov received the King's Medal of Merit (Kongens fortjenstmedalje) in silver for her contributions to Norwegian cuisine and economy.
