= Tyssedal =

Village in Ullensvang Municipality, Norway

- Village
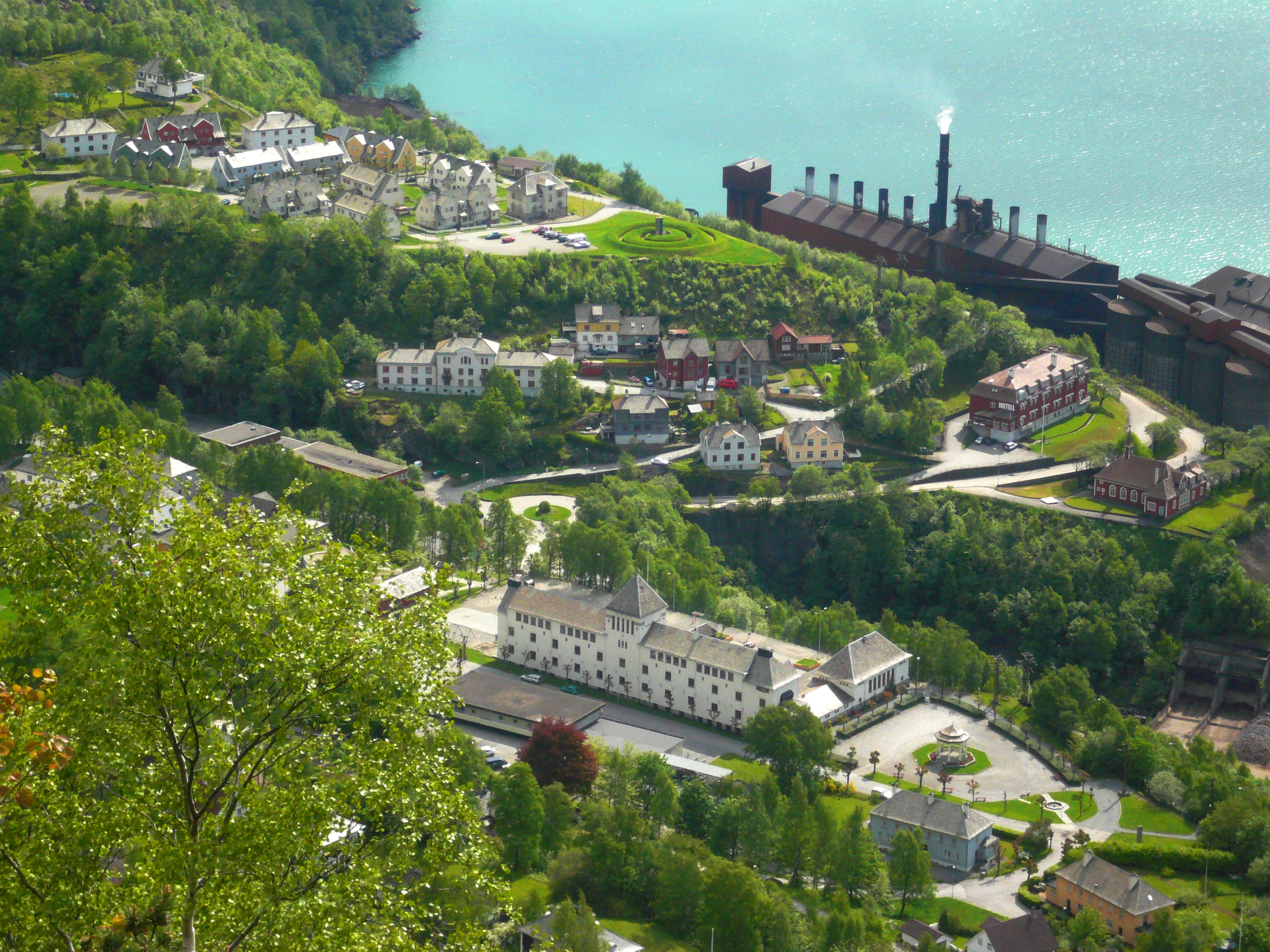
- View of the village
- Interactive map of Tyssedal
- Coordinates: 60.11631°N 6.55906°E
- Country: Norway
- Region: Western Norway
- County: Vestland
- District: Hardanger
- Municipality: Ullensvang Municipality

Area
  - Total: 0.6 km^{2} (0.23 sq mi)
- Elevation: 40 m (130 ft)

Population (2025)
  - Total: 596
  - Density: 993/km^{2} (2,570/sq mi)
- Time zone: UTC+01:00 (CET)
  - Summer (DST): UTC+02:00 (CEST)
- Post Code: 5770 Tyssedal

Tyssedal is a village in Ullensvang Municipality in Vestland county, Norway. The village is located on the shore of the Sørfjorden about 6 kilometres (3.7 mi) north of the town of Odda. Tyssedal is located in an environment in a valley between the fjord to the west and the mountains leading up to the Hardangervidda mountain plateau to the east.

Tyssedal Church is located in this village. The lake Ringedalsvatnet and the Trolltunga cliff are located just to the east, higher up in the valley.

The 0.6-square-kilometre (150-acre) village has a population (2025) of 596 and a population density of 993 inhabitants per square kilometre (2,570/sq mi).

== History ==
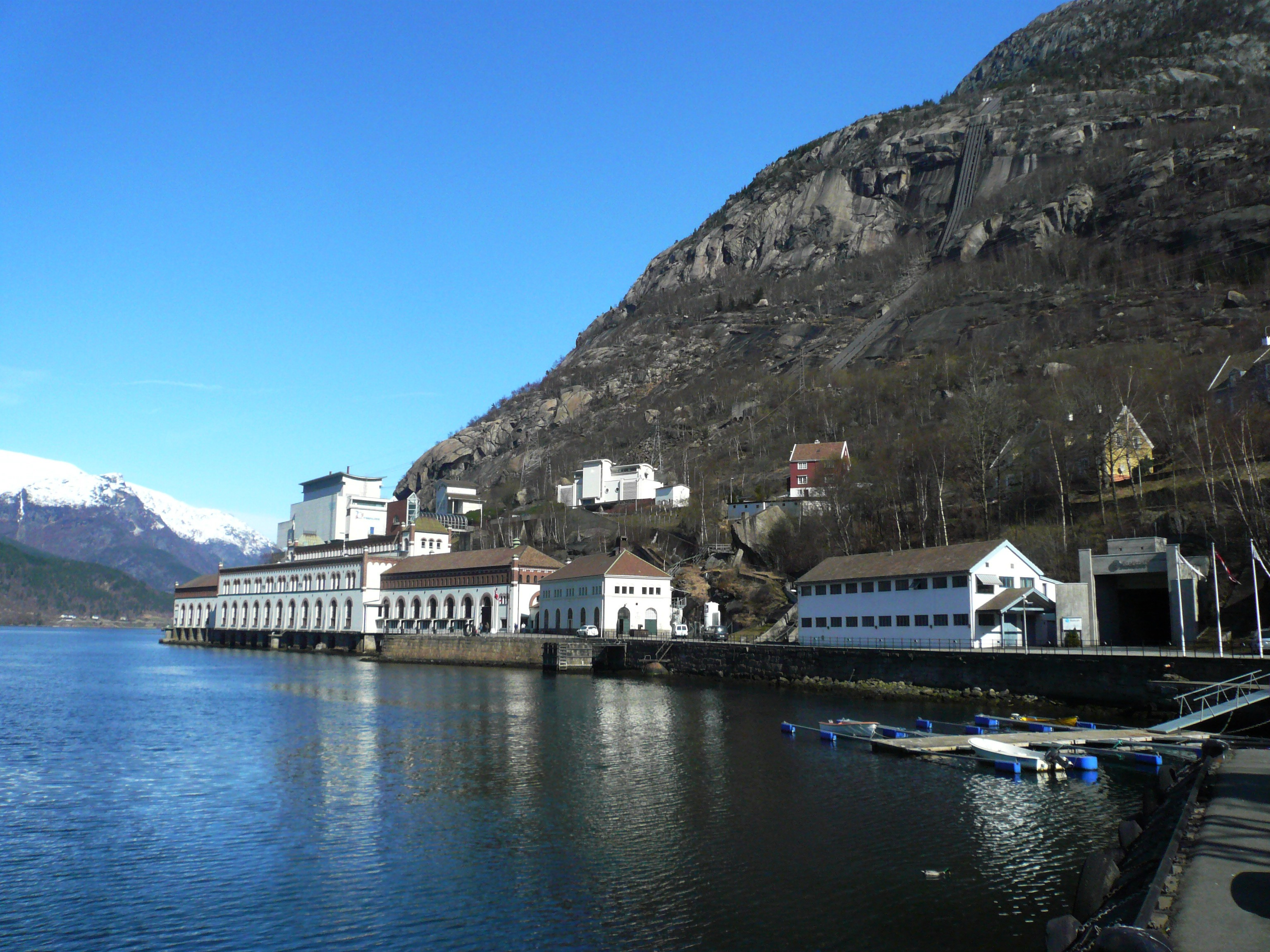
Tyssedal kraftverk

Tyssedal is a typical monotown, depending upon the energy received from the hydropower station. The first hydropower station in Tyssedal, Tysso I, is today part of the Norwegian Museum of Hydropower and Industry.

The ilmenite smelter "Tinfos Titan and Iron" (TTI) (once owned by Tinfos, known as the Eramet Titanium & Iron plant) is located here and is the largest employer in the village. The smelter was converted from making aluminium in the late 1980s. Tyssedal grew up around this smelter in the early-twentieth century.

In 2024 Eramet sold its plant to Ineos for $245 million.

== Language ==
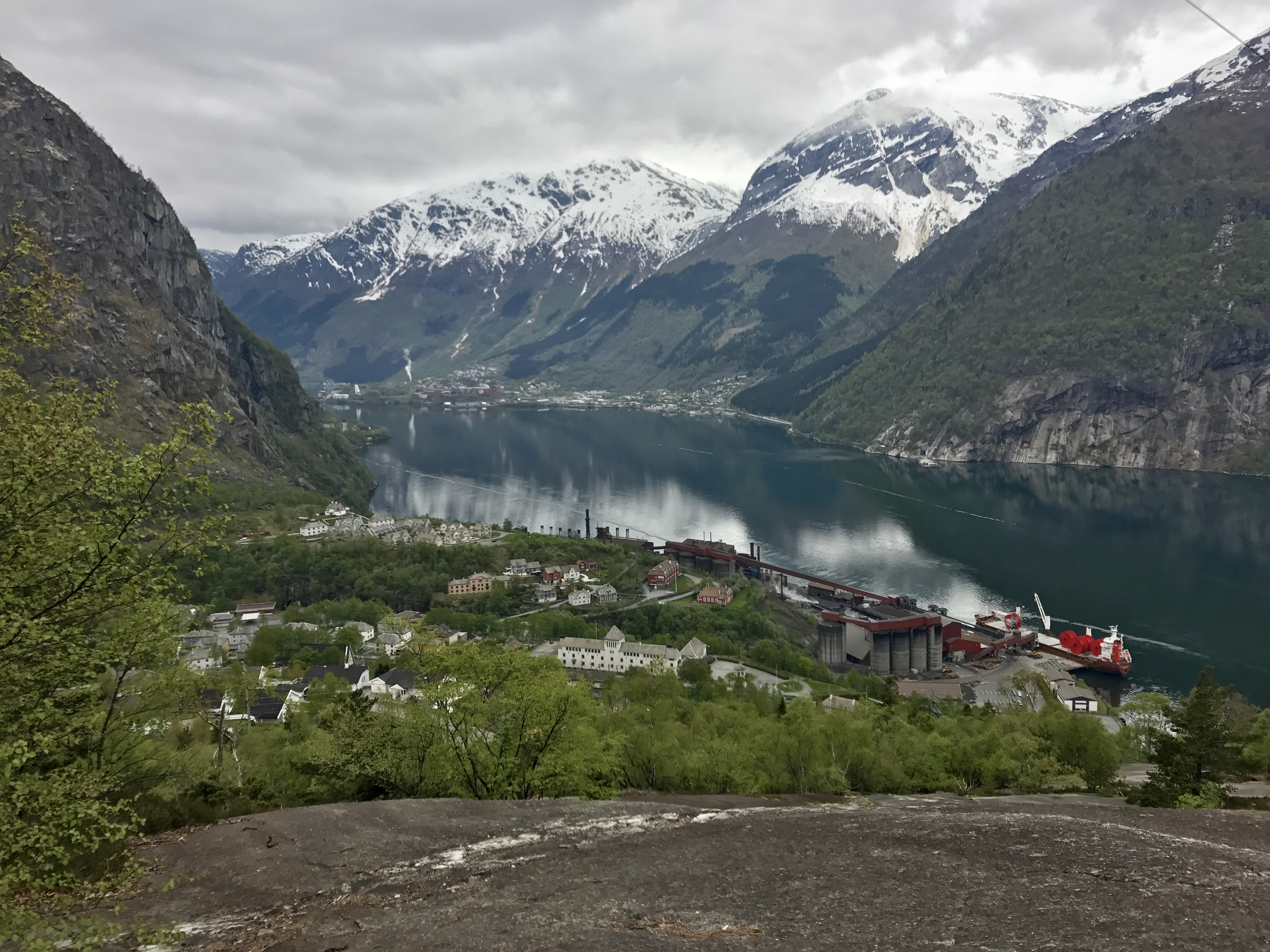
View of Tyssedal

Tyssedal drew migrants from different parts of Norway, who spoke different Norwegian dialects. From these there developed a compromise dialect, what linguists call a koiné language. Tyssedal and the nearby town of Odda—which arose in the same time and socio-economic circumstances but from a more homogeneous population—provided valuable insights to linguists studying this phenomenon.

Professor Paul Kerswill conducted an intensive study of the Norwegian spoken in the two communities, relating them to very different geographical origins: The workers in Odda came predominantly (86%) from western Norway. In Tyssedal only about one third came from western Norway; one third came from eastern Norway; and the rest from other parts of the country. The dialects that evolved in these two communities were radically different from each other, though spoken at a short geographical distance from each other.

== See also ==
- Tyssedal Hydroelectric Power Station

== Related reading ==
- Paul Kerswill (2003) "Koineization and Accommodation" The Handbook of Language Variation and Change (Wiley-Blackwell. Chapter 26) ISBN 9781405116923
