= Nøkkelost =

Norwegian cheese

Nøkkelost (lit. 'key cheese') is a Norwegian name for kuminost (lit. 'cumin cheese'), a cheese flavoured with cumin and cloves. It is semi-hard, yellow, and made from cow's milk, in the shape of wheels or blocks, with a maturation period of three months.

Nøkkelost cheese is similar to the Dutch cheese, Nagelkaas, which is itself an unprotected name variant of kanterkaas. There are differing theories on the origin of the Norwegian name. The most likely is that it is a false cognate in Norwegian of the Dutch Nagelkaas, which translates to "nail cheese", owing to the nail-like shape of the cloves. Another theory is that as a factory-made variation of the Dutch Leyden cheese, which has its origins in the 17th century, the Norwegian nøkkel (meaning "key") is a reference to Leiden's coat of arms.

There was a version of Nøkkelost manufactured and marketed in the US throughout the 1960s. Kraft Foods first called it "Caraway" then later used "Kuminost Spiced Cheese" on the label.

== See also ==
- List of cheeses
- List of Norwegian cheeses
