= Joker Is =

Defunct Norwegian ice cream company

Joker Is A/S
- Industry: Food manufacturing
- Defunct: 1991
- Fate: Purchase
- Successor: Drammens Is
- Headquarters: Trondheim, Norway
- Products: Ice cream
- Parent: Nidar Bergene

Joker Is is a defunct Norwegian manufacturer of ice cream that was bought by Drammens Is in 1991. For many years, the company was owned by the Nidar Group and eventually Nora Industrier, then from 1988 by the brothers Jan Erik Hokstad and Einar Hokstad. Drammens Is discarded the brand after they purchased the company. Joker Is had production and head offices in Trondheim.
