= Fløtemysost =

Type of brunost made from cow's milk

Fløtemysost or Fløytemysost is a type of brunost or brown cheese made from cow's milk.

Fløtemysost has a mild taste and bright color. The mild flavor has made fløtemysost very popular. Geitost, which is made from goat's milk, is the counterpart to fløtemysost. Goat cheese has a stronger taste than fløtemysost.

Traditionally brunost was made on farms throughout Norway by boiling whey without the addition of milk or cream. This became a sugar rich, lean product. Fløtemysost was first made when Anne Hov added cow cream to cow whey creating a firmer, fatty, more cheese-like product. Later, she added goat milk and Gudbrandsdalsost was created.

== See also ==
- List of cheeses
