= Norvegia =

Norwegian cheese brand

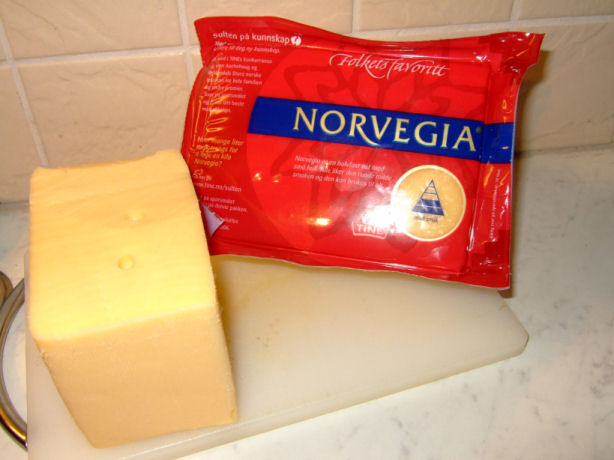
Norvegia

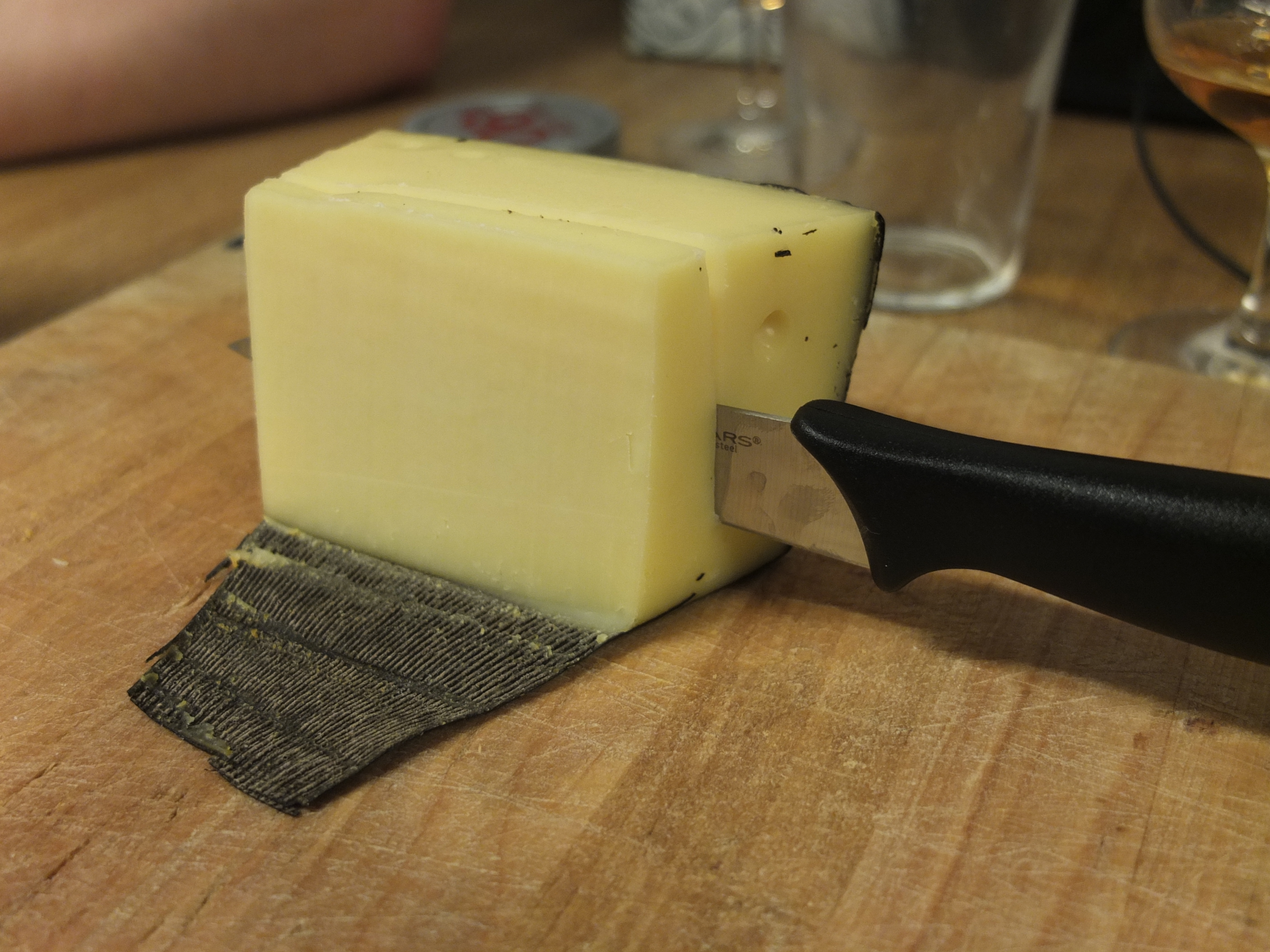
Norvegia Vellagret in use

Norvegia (Latin for 'Norway') is a Norwegian brand of cheese produced by the Norwegian dairy company Tine. It has a market share of about 60% of white cheeses in Norway. It is Norway's best-selling cheese. It is similar to Gouda, has a mild taste and melts easily. There are different types of it. It has been produced since the 1890s. Its recipe details remain a trade secret of Tine.

== Production ==
Pasteurized milk is filled into large cheese vats and is heated to approx. 30 °C. Then rennet and leavening culture are added. It is the culture of leavening that is decisive for the taste, consistency and perforation of the cheese. The sour culture for Norvegia is special and how this particular culture has been arrived at is a secret. The curd causes the milk to solidify, giving it a jelly-like consistency. The jelly is then cut into small cubes by longitudinal and transverse knives. Gradually the cubes contract into solid cheese grains, in this process the whey is separated. The cheese grains are then pressed together into large cakes which are placed in molds to be salted and left to mature. Normal Norvegia matures for 3 months, while a variety called well-aged Norvegia matures for 8 to 15 months.

== See also ==
- Jarlsberg cheese
- List of cheeses
