= Primost =

Norwegian cheese

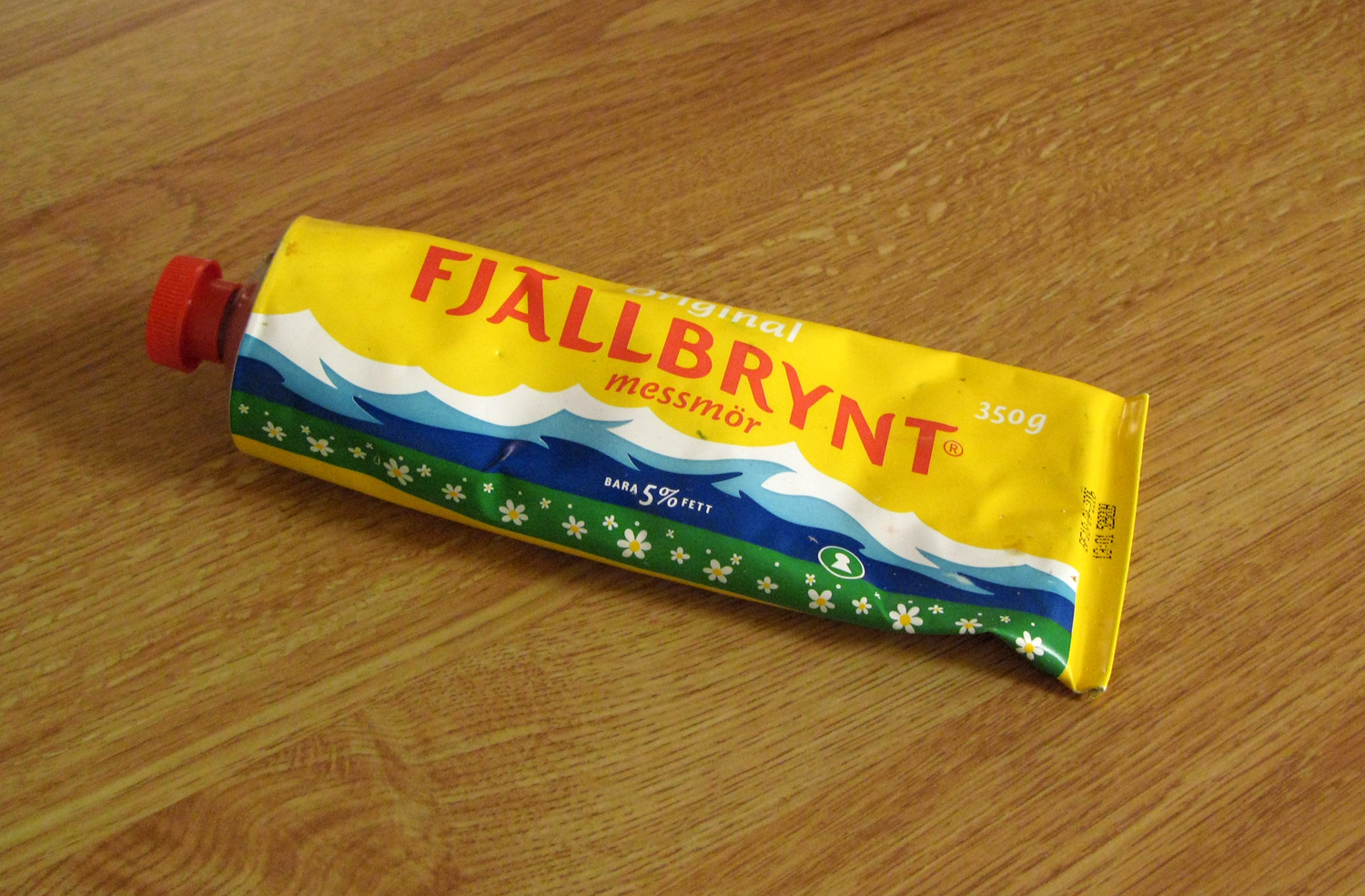
A tube of primost (messmör)

Primost or prime cheese is a Scandinavian cheese made from cow's milk. Most likely originated in the middle of Sweden It is slightly brown and has a soft spreadable texture. Cream is added towards the end of the process. The semi-sweet taste is derived from caramelizing the milk sugars of the whey as it is made.

Primost is made in the same way as brunost, but the whey mixture is not cooked as long. These caramelized cheeses are often served with dark bread or Norwegian flatbread, as a dessert cheese, or as a cheese melted into a variety of culinary dishes.

== See also ==
- List of cheeses
