= Nizi International =

Nizi International S.A.
- Company type: Private
- Industry: Metal
- Founded: 1898
- Headquarters: Capellen, Luxembourg
- Key people: Gerlando Cappadona
- Products: Ferro alloys and Pig Iron
- Revenue: ▲ undisclosed
- Number of employees: 25
- Website: http://www.nizi. com/

Nizi International S.A. is a metals trading company headquartered in Capellen, Luxembourg. Nizi is owned by the Norwegian company Holta Invest and part of the Nizi Group. It was founded by Nicolas Zimmer in 1898, making it one of the oldest companies in its field of activity in Europe. Its main products are ferro alloys, foundry products, base metals and concentrates. Being a former part of the Tinfos Group, Nizi International was fully acquired by Holta Invest in 2010 and subsequently changed its name from Tinfos Nizi to Nizi International S.A. Nizi International is closed 2022.

Nizi International owns fellow metal trading and manufacturing companies such as Chemalloy and Miller in the US, Keyvest in Belgium and, since 2018, MPT in Sweden.

== European trade and distribution ==
Nizi International mainly focuses on distribution into the metallurgical sectors like foundries and steelworks producers worldwide.

== Nizi International products ==
- Ferro alloys
- Alloys
- Pig Iron
- Foundry products

== Standards ==
Nizi International complies the ISO 9001:2000 standard, and it is certificated by the entity TüV.

== Nizi International Group ==
- Keyvest Belgium S.A. Grace-Hollogne - Belgium
- Nizi International (DE) GmbH, Moers - Germany
- Nizi International (PL) Sp.z.o.o., Warsaw - Poland
- Nizi International SP, S.L., Madrid - Spain
- Nizi Metallurgical Trading (Beijing) Company Limited, Beijing - China
- Miller & Company LLC, Rosemont - USA
- Chemalloy Company LLC, Washington - USA
- Miller-Nizi Mexico S.de R.L. de C.V, Mexico City - Mexico

== Sources ==
- Corporative website
