= Tine (company) =

Norwegian dairy product cooperative

TINE SA
- Formerly: Norske Meieriers Eksportlag (1928-1942); Norske Meieriers Salgssentral (1942-1984); Norske Meierier (1984-1992); Tine (1992-2010)
- Type: Cooperative
- Industry: Dairy
- Founded: 1928
- Headquarters: Oslo, Norway
- Area served: Norway; Global
- Key people: Ann-Beth Johannesen Freuchen (CEO); Kristin Muri Møller (CFO)
- Products: Tinemelk milk Jarlsberg cheese Snøfrisk; Diplom-Is; Norvegia cheese
- Revenue: ▲30.1 billion kr (2025)
- Operating income: ▲2.4 billion kr (2025)
- Net income: ▲2.1 billion kr (2025)
- Number of employees: 5,318 (2025)
- Subsidiaries: Diplom-Is AS; Fjordland AS; Ilchester Cheese Company Ltd. Norseland Inc. Wernersson Ost AB; TINE Ireland; Mimiro AS
- Website: www.tine.no

TINE SA (Norwegian pronunciation: [ˈtìːnə]) is the largest Norwegian dairy product cooperative consisting of (as of 2025) 7,572 farmers and 5,318 employees, with a revenue of 30.1 billion Norwegian kroner (NOK) (USD3.225bn, GBP2.405bn, EUR2.785bn as of date of the annual report). The parent company, TINE SA, is a cooperative society owned by its suppliers, the milk producers who deliver milk to the company. The corporation domestically offers the entire spectrum of dairy products, and in many dairy categories, Tine faces little or no domestic competition. This monopolistic position has led to criticism of Tine when shortages occur. Tine's internationally known products are Jarlsberg cheese, Snøfrisk goat cheese, Heidal cheese, Ridder cheese, and Ski-Queen (brunost). Tine is the most dominant of the thirteen agricultural cooperatives in Norway.

== History ==
Dairy cooperatives in Norway go back to 1856, with the first nationwide dairy co-op Den Norske Meieriforening (the Norwegian Dairy Association) being founded in 1881. The company dates back to 1928, when "Norske Meieriers Eksportlag" (Norwegian Dairies' Export Company) was started. It changed its name to "Norske Meieriers Salgssentral" (Norwegian Dairies' Sales) in 1942, and to "Norske Meierier" (Norwegian Dairies) in 1984. The Tine name has been used as an easily identifiable brand name since 1992 for the company's dairy products. In 2008, Tine was ranked the world's #1 cooperative by size by the International Cooperative Alliance. In 2010, the company was changed to a nationwide group adapted to the Cooperatives Act, which was introduced from 2008, and the name was changed to TINE SA. TINE SA is one of the 13 farmer-owned nationwide cooperatives that are members of the interest organization Norsk Landbrukssamvirke.

The "tine" is a traditional Norwegian wooden container, not unlike the Shaker-style pantry box, which could be used to keep butter and cheese fresh.

== Subsidiaries ==
Subsidiaries which are partly or fully owned by TINE SA:

- Diplom-Is AS, Scandinavia's largest ice-cream producer (100% owned by TINE SA)
- Fjordland AS, a ready-made food company (51% owned by TINE SA)
- Ilchester Cheese Company Ltd. (previously Norseland Ltd.), Ireland and the United Kingdom division (100% owned by TINE SA)
- Norseland Inc., distributes and markets Tine's cheeses in Canada and the United States (100% owned by TINE SA)
- Wernersson Ost AB, sells and markets domestic and international cheeses in Sweden, Denmark and Finland (100% owned by TINE SA)
- TINE Ireland, produces Jarlsberg for the international market (100% owned by TINE SA)
- Mimiro AS, supplies digital cloud and AI-driven data tools to cooperative owners to oversee their operations (~56.6% owned by TINE SA)
