= Snøfrisk =

Norwegian goat cheese

Snøfrisk (Norwegian pronunciation: [snøfrisk]) is a Norwegian goat cheese made by Tine.

Snøfrisk is white and creamy, without any yellow pigmentation. The name translates as snow fresh. The cheese was first introduced to the public in time for the 1994 Winter Olympics. Made from 80 percent goat cheese and 20 percent cow's milk cream, it is soft enough to be used as a spread. Snøfrisk is sold in triangular plastic packaging and comes in several flavours, including straight, juniper berry, dill and forest mushrooms. Snøfrisk contains 25 percent fat and is fresh and sour with a clear, but still round goat's milk taste. In addition to the natural version of Snøfrisk, the cheese is sold in varieties flavored with pepper & garlic, chanterelle, dill, and ramsons & garlic. The cheese is also exported, and since 2012 Russia has been the cheese's largest export market.

== See also ==
- List of cheeses
- List of goat milk cheeses
