= Eramet Titanium & Iron =

Iron plant in Tyssedal, Norway

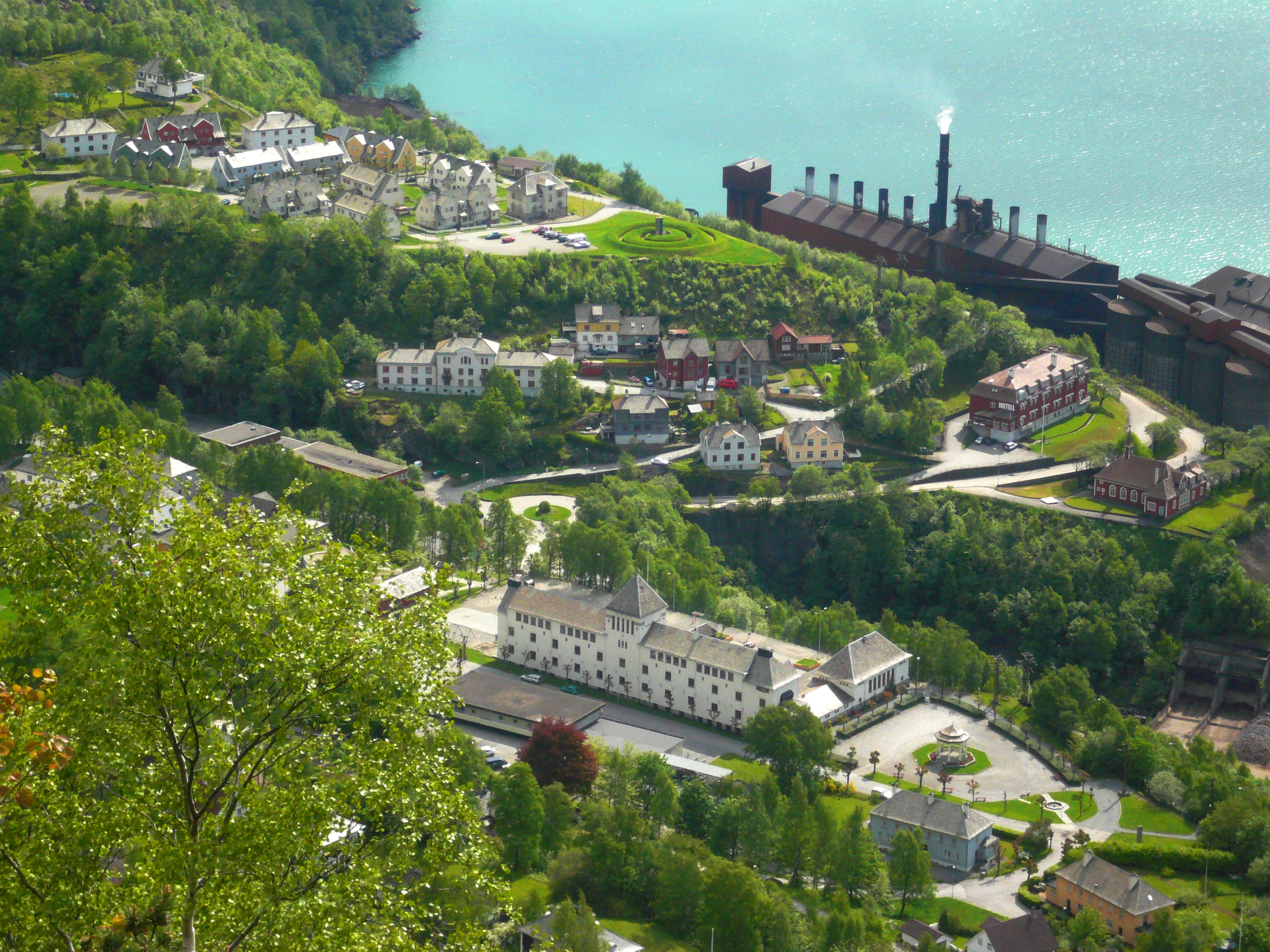
Tyssedal Norway - the smelter is visible at fjord side

Eramet Titanium & Iron is a pig iron and titanium dioxide clinker plant in Tyssedal, Norway. It benefits from ores local to Norway which have almost a 50% TiO_{2} fraction.

== History ==
The plant was established as Ilmenittsmelteverket on 21 December 1983 as a replacement after Det Norske Nitridaktieselskap closed its aluminum plant in Tyssedal. Production commenced in 1986. In 1988 it was bought by Tinfos Jernverk and renamed Tinfos Titan & Iron.

In 2008 Tinfos was bought by Eramet, giving the plant its current name.

In May 2020 Eramet announced the sale of the plant to Tronox. The sale was later abandoned (2021), in part due to an investigation by the UK CMA.

On 22 September 2023, Eramet sold the plant to Ineos for $245 million. The plant was renamed Ineos Tyssedal. The deal also included a long-term supply contract for ilmenite produced by Eramet's Senegalese Grande Côte Opérations.
