= Jarlsberg cheese =

Norwegian medium-hard Alpine-type cheese

Jarlsberg
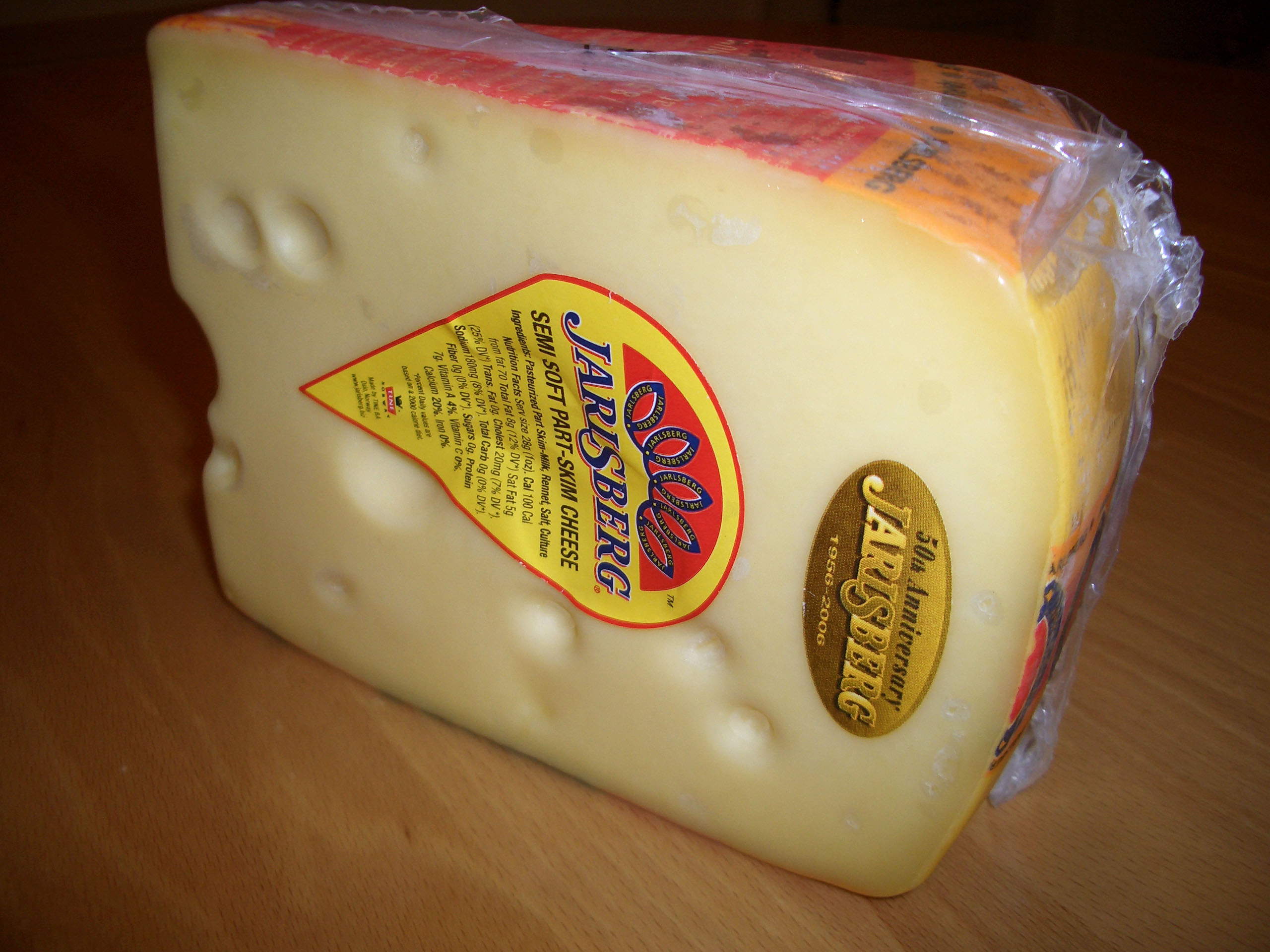
- Country of origin: Norway
- Region: Jarlsberg
- Source of milk: Cows
- Texture: Semi-soft
- Named after: Jarlsberg Manor

Jarlsberg (/ˈjɑːrlzbɜːrɡ/ YARLZ-burg, Norwegian: [ˈjɑ̀ːlsbærɡ]) is a brand of mild Swiss-type cheese made from cow's milk. The brand trademark is owned by Tine SA, the largest Norwegian agricultural cooperative. It is named after the former countship of Jarlsberg and its Jarlsberg Manor. The cheese's production method was developed in 1956 by Ole Martin Ystgaard at the Dairy Institute at the Agricultural University of Norway, based in part on recipes dating back to the 1850s (in turn based on Swiss recipes introduced to the area in the 1830s).

Besides Norway, the brand is also produced in Ireland by Dairygold under a licensing agreement and in the U.S. state of Ohio by Alpine Cheese Co. under contract from Tine's U.S. subsidiary, Norseland, Inc.

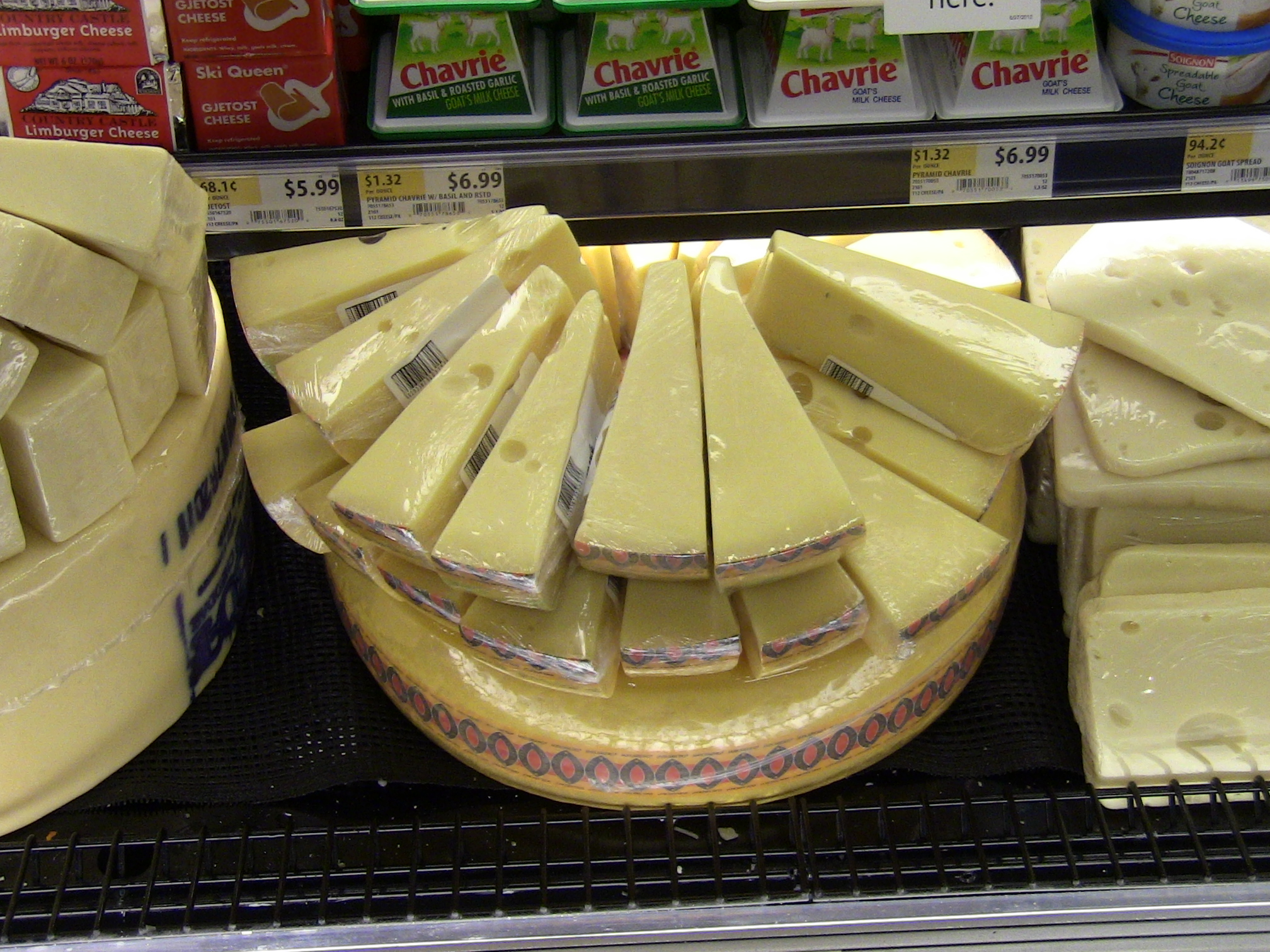
Jarlsberg cheese in a Whole Foods in Washington, D.C, United States

== Description ==
Jarlsberg cheese has a yellow wax rind (outer layer) and a semi-firm yellow interior. It is a mild, buttery cheese. The flavour has been described as "clean and rich, with a slightly sweet and nutty flavour". It is an all-purpose cheese, used for both cooking and eating as a snack. It has a characteristic smooth, shiny-yellow body and a creamy, supple texture. It is aged a minimum of three months and is distinguished by medium to large holes. Some variations are aged a minimum of 9, 12 or 15 months. It is usually produced in 10-kilogram (22 lb) wheels with an approximate diameter of 330 millimetres (13 in) and a height of 95 to 105 millimetres (3.7 to 4.1 in). The characteristic holes or "eyes" are the result of the action of the bacteria Propionibacterium freudenreichii which naturally occurs in milk and is added back into the cheese during production according to a closely guarded trade secret formula.

== History ==
The history of this cheese can be traced back to the middle 1850s. Anders Larsen Bakke (1815–1899), a farmer and pioneer in Norway's dairy industry, produced cheese in Våle Municipality in the old Jarlsberg and Larviks Amt (now called Vestfold conuty), 80 km (50 mi) south of Oslo. His cheese shared similarities with the Swiss cheese Emmental, introduced to Vestfold by Swiss cheese makers during the 1830s. The cheese was first noted in the annual county report of Jarlsberg and Larviks Amt in 1855. After several years of popularity marked by a large volume of production, this cheese disappeared from the market.

Modern Jarlsberg cheese was developed in 1956 by Ole Martin Ystgaard of the Dairy Institute at the Agricultural University of Norway. Ystgaard's interest was sparked by the thesis of a dairy sciences student, Per Sakshaug, on the cheese historically made in Vestfold. It was named for a Norwegian nobleman, Count Wedel Jarlsberg, who owned land near Oslo in an area where an earlier version of the cheese was produced in the early 1800s, or for the eponymous county. The recipe was developed from formulae originating with Swiss cheesemakers who moved to Norway at that time.

== Production and distribution ==
"Jarlsberg" is a trademark first registered by Tine SA in 1972, and the exact nature and formula for the process of making Jarlsberg cheese is a trade secret. Tine is the largest Norwegian dairy product cooperative. Jarlsberg cheese accounts for 80% of Tine's total exports from Norway. Tine's United States subsidiary, Norseland, had sold 150 million 22 lb (10 kg) wheels of Jarlsberg cheese in the U.S. as of 2004.

Jarlsberg cheese was introduced in the United States in 1964. Imports to the U.S. in 1965 were 25 million pounds (11,000,000 kg). Since 1979, imports to the U.S. have been limited to 15 million pounds (6,800,000 kg). As of 2004, Jarlsberg was the most popular cheese import to the U.S., even though 5–10 million pounds (2,300,000–4,500,000 kg) of Jarlsberg cheese was also being made annually within the U.S. state of Ohio. It is also produced in Ireland by Dairygold. The process used for the brand's production in Ohio is somewhat different from the original method developed for Norway, partly due to U.S. milk being somewhat different, although the production process uses bacteria cultures that are frozen and shipped from Norway.

Annual sales of Jarlsberg cheese in the United Kingdom were £6.9m as of 2013. Jarlsberg cheese is also popular in Australia. Jarlsberg is used as a topping for Pizza Grandiosa, the best-selling frozen pizza in Norway.

== See also ==
- List of cheeses
- Emmental cheese, a Swiss cheese style from which Jarlsberg was developed
- Leerdammer, a Dutch Emmental-style cheese brand more generically called Maasdam cheese
- Norvegia, another Norwegian cheese brand produced by Tine SA, similar to Gouda
