= Fjordland =

Norwegian food manufacturer

Fjordland AS
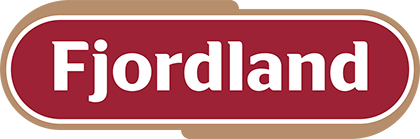
- Type: Private
- Industry: Food
- Founded: 1994
- Headquarters: Oslo, Norway
- Area served: Norway
- Products: Brelett; Bremykt; Fjordland dinner
- Revenue: ▲NOK 815 million (2006)
- Number of employees: 70 (2026)
- Parent: Tine (51%); Nortura (39%); Hoff (10%)
- Website: www.fjordland.no

Fjordland is a Norwegian food manufacturer that produces easy made dinners, margarine, yogurt and other dessert dairy products. It is owned by the three agricultural cooperatives Tine, Nortura and Hoff and uses raw products from the three owners as well as seafood. In addition to dinners branded as Fjordland, the company makes the product brands Brelett, Bremykt, Kos, Safari and Yoplait.

The company was founded in 1994 by Tine with the responsibility of producing Bremykt, Brelett and Tine Grøt. In 1996 Norsk Kjøttsamvirke, Norske Potetindustrier and Prior Norge bought part of the company. The dinner courses were launched in 1997.
