= Diplom-Is =

Norwegian ice cream manufacturer

Diplom-Is AS
- Type: Subsidiary
- Industry: Ice cream
- Founded: 1930
- Headquarters: Oslo, Norway
- Area served: Scandinavia
- Key people: Martin Kjekshus (CEO)
- Revenue: ▲1,154 billion kr
- Number of employees: 510 (2020)
- Parent: TINE SA
- Website: www.diplom-is.no

Diplom-Is AS is a Norwegian manufacturer of ice cream owned by the dairy group Tine. In 2005, the company produced 51,100,000 litres (11,200,000 imp gal; 13,500,000 US gal) of ice cream, and held a market share of 53% domestically.

Among the most notable own brands are Royal, Dream, Krone-Is, Pin-Up, Lollipop, Sandwich, Pia, Gullpinne, Gigant and Klin Kokos. It also produces the franchise Mövenpick, Mars and Nestlé in Scandinavia.

== History ==
The first ice cream factories in Norway were established in the 1920s, and towards the end of the decade the Norwegian Dairies established their own brand, Diplom Is in Oslo, with its first advertisement appearing in 1930. By 1931 the production went on continually through the year, and Oslo got its own ice cream truck. Production was low during World War II, and after the war there were numerous independent ice cream manufacturers. Many of these were owned by the regional dairy cooperatives. In 1951 these were all branded as Diplom-Is and the brand became national.

Though having a common brand, it was not until 1991 that all the production of ice cream by the dairies was collected in one company, Norsk Iskrem BA (lit. Norwegian Ice Cream). The following four years saw the "ice cream war" between Diplom-Is and the Swedish GB Is, but by 1995, GB had to withdraw from the Norwegian market. At the same time, Diplom-Is started to franchise produce the Swiss brand Mövenpick. In 1992, the company established itself in Denmark, and in 2004 in Sweden. In 2002, the legal name changed to Diplom-Is AS.

On 30 September 2010, Unilever signed an asset purchase agreement with the Norwegian dairy group TINE, to acquire the activities of Diplom-Is in Denmark.
