= Brunost =

Norwegian dairy product

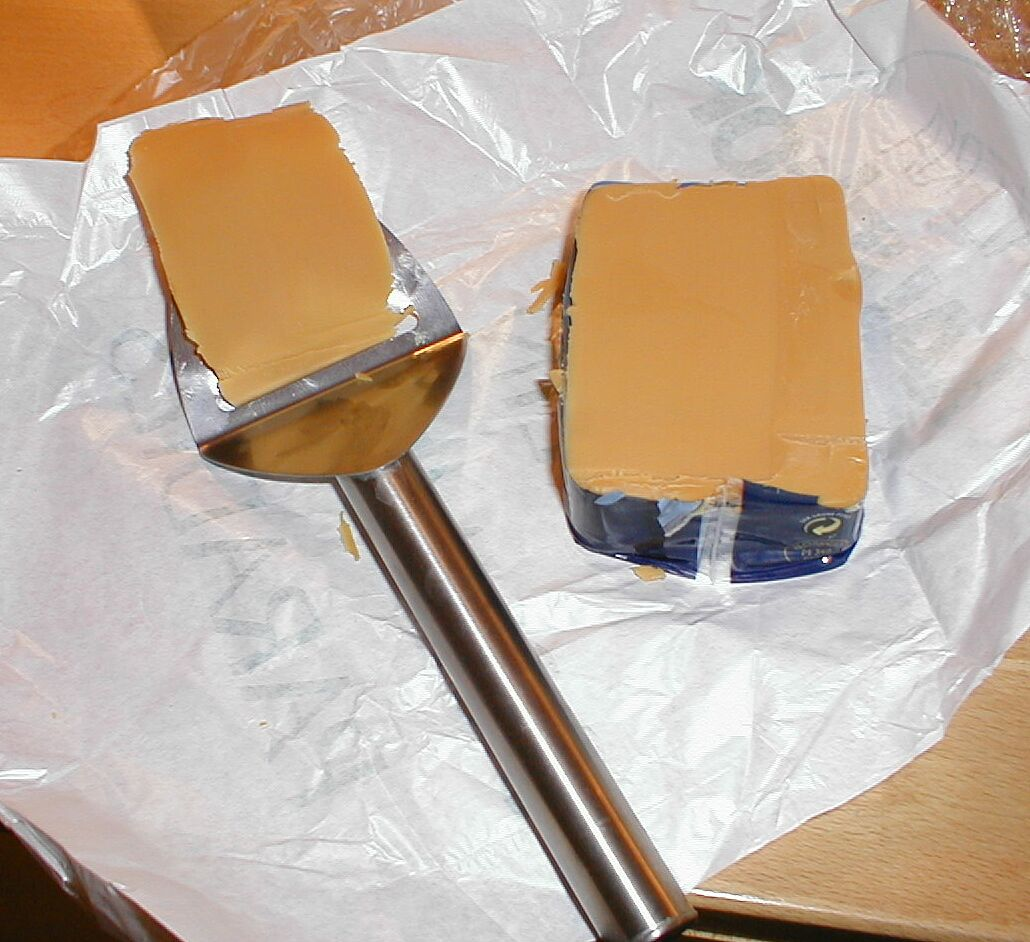
- Brunost is usually sliced very thinly.
- Alternative names: Mysost
- Type: Whey cheese
- Place of origin: Norway
- Main ingredients: Whey, milk, and/or cream
- Variations: geitost (=gjetost); fløtemysost (=Gudbrandsdalsost); prim
- Food energy (per serving): 66 kcal (280 kJ)
- Other information: Typically served as a sandwich, crispbread, or biscuit topping, or in sauces

Brunost (lit. 'brown cheese') is a common Norwegian name for mysost (lit. 'whey cheese'; Danish: myseost; Swedish: mesost; Finnish: mesjuusto; Icelandic: mysuostur), a family of soft cheese-related foods made with whey, milk, and/or cream. The characteristic brown color and sweet taste result from milk sugars being caramelized after boiling. The term brunost is often used to refer to fløtemysost or Gudbrandsdalsost ('Gudbrandsdal cheese'), which are the most popular varieties.

Brunost is primarily produced in Norway and is popular there, and has spread to South Korea. It is regarded as one of Norway's most iconic foodstuffs, and is considered an important part of the country's gastronomical and cultural identity and heritage.

== History ==
Boiling down whey 10:1 to create a brown, cheesy spread (such as the Norwegian prim and Swedish messmör) has been common in the Scandinavian countries for at least 2,500 years. An archeological find from September 2016 in central Jutland has determined that a cheese residue on pottery from circa 650 B.C.E. is a type of cheese possibly similar to brunost.

However, the creation of the modern, firm, fatty brunost is commonly attributed to the milkmaid Anne Hov from the rural valley of Gudbrandsdalen. In the second half of the 19th century, Gudbrandsdalen was suffering economically due to falling profits from grain and butter sales. While working at the Valseter mountain farm near Gålå in 1863, Anne Hov (sometimes spelled Anne Haav) came up with the idea of adding cream to the whey when boiling, and to boil it down in an iron pot until the fluid content was reduced to less than 80 percent, creating a firmer, fattier, more cheese-like product. She originally called it feitost ('fat cheese'). The name later changed into fløtemysost ('cream whey cheese'). The product immediately caught on, and was soon commonly produced and consumed in the area. This variety is currently the second most popular type in Norway.

When Hov married and moved to Rusthågå farm in Nord-Fron Municipality, she started larger-scale production and invented a variety where she added goat's milk to the mix for a more pronounced taste. The local trader Ole Kongsli liked it so much he thought there might be a market for the product in the capital, Christiania (former name of Oslo). He started exporting it to his business contacts in Christiania under the name Gudbrandsdalsost (lit. 'Gudbrandsdal cheese'), and it became so successful that it contributed significantly to the economy of the region, thus helping Gudbrandsdalen out of recession. In 1933, at age 87, Hov received the King's Medal of Merit (Kongens fortjenstmedalje) for her contributions to Norwegian cuisine and economy.

In modern times, the world's largest producer of brunost is the Norwegian dairy co-operative Tine, which markets a total of 13 varieties, as well as three types of prim. The second-largest is Norwegian dairy company Synnøve Finden, which markets two varieties of brunost, as well as two varieties of prim. There are also a number of smaller, artisanal producers, mainly in Norway and in the US.

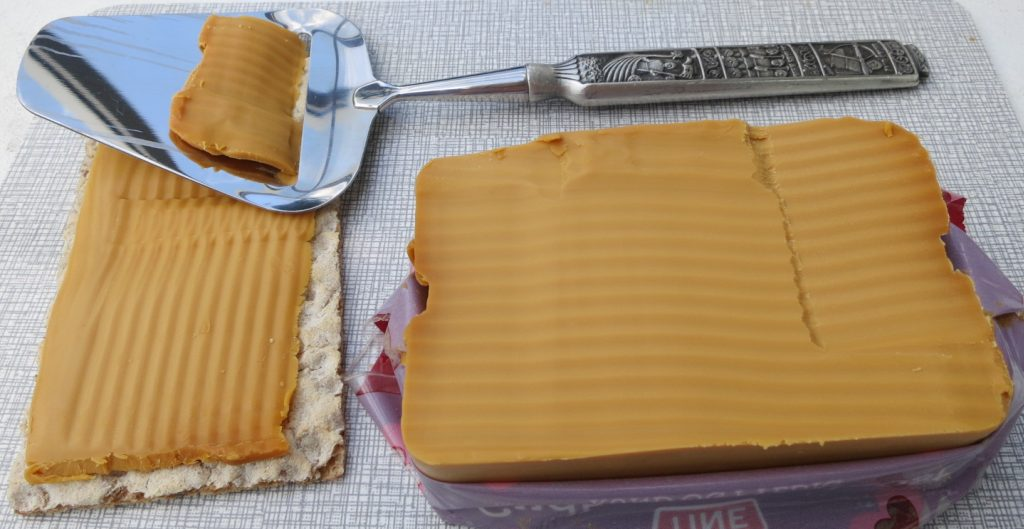
Brunost with crispbread and cheese slicer

== Description ==
Mysost is a family of cheese-related foods made with whey and milk and/or cream. The main ingredient, whey, is a byproduct of the cheese making process; it is what is left when the cheese is removed from the milk. Therefore, brunost is not technically cheese. However, it is produced by cheese makers, and is sold, handled and consumed in the same way as cheese. Therefore, it is generally regarded as a cheese. The texture is firm, but slightly softer than Gouda cheese, for example, and lends itself well to cutting and shaping. It does not crumble like hard cheeses. The taste is sweet, and best described as caramel-like, but with a tang that is more noticeable in the variants that contain goat's milk. The variant ekte geitost ('true goat's cheese') contains only whey and goat's milk, and has an intense, chèvre-like taste that cuts the sweetness.

== Production ==
Brunost is made by boiling a mixture of milk, cream, and whey carefully for several hours so that the water evaporates. The heat turns the milk sugars into caramel, which gives the cheese its characteristic brown colour and sweetness. It is ready for consumption as soon as it is packed and refrigerated. Low-fat varieties are made by increasing the proportion of whey to milk and cream.

== Varieties ==
In Norway, brunost is commonly divided into two types: those that contain only cow's cream and/or milk, and the ones that contain some proportion of goat's milk. The latter type is commonly called geitost or gjetost ('goat cheese'). Varieties that do not contain any cow's milk are called ekte geitost ('true goat cheese'). Technically, the name 'true goat cheese' is misleading, since goat cheese (such as the French chèvre) is relatively uncommon in Norway, and is commonly called hvit geitost ('white goat cheese') to avoid confusion.

By far the most popular variety is Gudbrandsdalsost, which contains a mixture of cow and goat milk, cream, and whey. Heidal cheese is a type of Gudbrandsdalsost. In Norway it is so common that it is simply referred to as brunost or geitost, assuming that unless otherwise specified, Gudbrandsdalsost will be provided. This variety is also the most popular internationally, and in the US it is commonly referred to just as gjetost. The second most popular variety is fløtemysost, which has a milder taste due to the lack of goat's milk. The third most popular type is ekte geitost.

Related to brunost are prim (in Norwegian) or messmör (in Swedish), which is a soft, sweet spread commonly sold in tubes all across the Nordic countries. This is the original, ancient product made by boiling whey for a shorter period of time than brunost, and not adding milk or cream. Also, in Norway, pultost is traditionally made from byproducts of the brunost-making process, and has a very distinctive flavour.

Very similar to full cow's milk brunost, but unrelated to it (probably developed independently) is requeijão moreno, from the state of Minas Gerais in Brazil. It is produced in a similar way, by boiling cow's milk until it caramelises and darkens to a brown colour, hence the name moreno 'tanned, brown'. Requeijão has three varieties: branco 'white', de raspa 'with scrapes' (because of the streaks of caramelised milk scraped from the pan), and moreno. The flavour and texture of the latter have a remarkable resemblance to brunost.

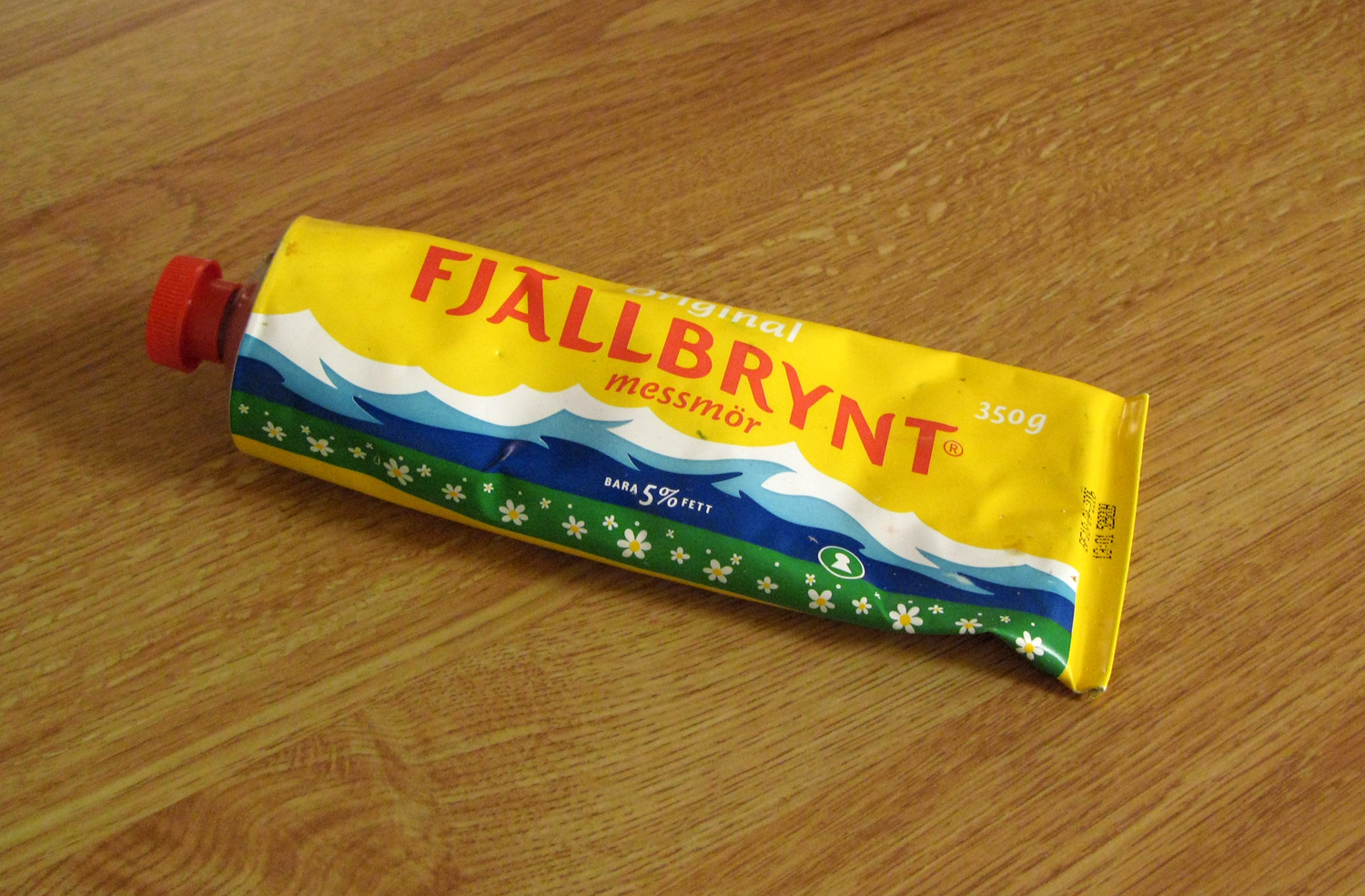
Messmör

== Use ==
Brunost is mostly used as a topping for sandwiches, crispbread, and biscuits. It is very common in the traditional Norwegian matpakke (lit. 'food pack'), which is a common Norwegian lunch—sandwiches are packed in a lunch box in the morning, and carried to work for consumption in the 30-minute lunch break commonly afforded to Norwegian workers. One advantage of brunost for this purpose is that although its texture changes if not refrigerated, its taste does not. Brunost is also popular on Norwegian waffles, and as an ingredient in cooking, particularly in gravy for game meat.

== Nutrition ==
To what extent brunost is healthy has been the subject of some controversy in Norway. On the one hand, brunost contains high amounts of calcium, proteins and vitamin B, as well as iodine, which is beneficial. It also does not, as other cheeses do, contain salt. It used to contain significant amounts of iron because it was traditionally made in iron pots. In fact, when modern production methods with aluminium pans were introduced by the Norwegian dairy co-operative, the government was worried that it would significantly reduce iron intake in the general population, and ordered iron to be added to the cheese. On 1 September 2001, however, a ban on the addition of iron to brunost was introduced. A few years later, exceptions to the ban were introduced after health authorities identified an increasing incidence of iron deficiency in younger age groups. Modern brunost does not contain significant amounts of iron.

On the other hand, the (natural) sugar content of brunost is quite high, and also the fat content is significant, causing some to warn against it, and even likening it to milk chocolate. Some tests have shown major nutritional differences between different varieties of brunost. Also, it has been pointed out by nutrition experts that the fat content of most brunost is significantly lower than that of numerous other cheeses, such as soft cheeses.

Where many sorts of cheese are naturally lactose free, brunost is high in lactose.

== Brattli tunnel fire ==
In January 2013, a lorry caught fire in the 3.5 km (2.2 mi) long Brattli tunnel in Tysfjord Municipality. The temperature of the burning lorry rose so high that the 27 tonnes (27 long tons; 30 short tons) of brunost it was carrying caught fire also. Its fats and sugars fueled the blaze and prevented firefighters from approaching it until four days later when most of it had burned out. The tunnel was severely damaged, and was closed for repair for several months afterward. The accident was widely publicized in international media, and was dubbed "the goat cheese fire". It was likened to the 1999 Mont Blanc tunnel fire, when a truck carrying margarine and flour caught fire.
