= HOFF =

Norwegian potato-processing cooperative

HOFF SA
- Formerly: Norske Potetindustrier (NOPO)
- Type: Cooperative
- Industry: Food processing
- Founded: 1982
- Headquarters: Gjøvik, Norway
- Area served: Norway
- Key people: Ken Are Østlid (CEO); Hanne Refsholt (chair)
- Products: Frozen, fresh, and processed potato products; potato starch; glucose; spirits
- Number of employees: Over 200
- Website: www.hoff.no

HOFF (Norwegian for the company's potato brand; formally HOFF SA) is a Norwegian brand and potato-industry company that was created as Norske Potetindustrier (NOPO) in 1982. Hoff was NOPO's own trademark and became the company name from 2010.

Hoff works in the processing and marketing of potatoes, including french fries, mashed potato, potato starch, glucose, and spirits. The products are marketed to the grocery, industrial, and professional markets under the HOFF trademark, with brands such as Opphøgde Potteter and Liv Laga. The company has production plants in Gjøvik, Brumunddal, Jæren, and Inderøy.

== History ==
The potato has been a central foodstuff in Norway since the 18th century. In addition to daily household consumption of this easily grown tuber, it was also used early as a raw material in spirit production. Potato starch became an important industrial product that furthered industrialization, and the development after 1960 has moved toward ever more industrially made potato products. The development of industrial products with the potato as raw material has been decisive over a long period in which daily household consumption of potatoes has fallen in favor of rice and pasta, among other things; the production of dried mashed potato began in the early 1960s, while french-fries production started around 1970.

=== The potato producers come together ===
Potetmelfabrikkenes Salgskontor was constituted in 1941. In 1982 this organization merged with Brennerienes Forening to form Norske Potetindustrier (NOPO). In 1994 the members of the local distilleries and potato-starch factories joined with their common organization NOPO and 4,000 potato producers to form a single industrial cooperative, still under the name Norske Potetindustrier SA. The HOFF trademark was taken into the company name from 2001, and in 2010 this was simplified to HOFF SA.

In total the business now has around 100 products and variants in its portfolio. The four factories employ over 200 people, and the company is the country's largest potato-processing business. More than a third of the country's potato production is delivered to Hoff, and the company had a turnover of 450 million kroner in 2020.

=== Holmen Brænderi ===
Holmen Brænderi at Gjøvik is a core part of what is today Hoff. The distillery started in 1854 when farmers from Vardal, Østre and Vestre Toten, Nes, and Ringsaker came together to form a cooperative and place a potato distillery at Holmen, a holding under the large Hunn farm. Operation began in 1857, four years before Gjøvik received its town charter. Holmen was at first a pure potato distillery, but the business was soon expanded with an ox barn, at most holding 300 animals, which were fed on the nutritious distiller's wash from the distillery. A new mill was also built, which burned in 1882; after the fire a new brick mill with six grindstones was built, which still stands but has been given new functions.

New shareholders formed AS Holmen Brænderi in 1902, and the business was expanded with Gjøvik Mineralvandsfabrik, a potato-starch factory, and somewhat later a potato-drying plant, with production and sale of beer also starting in 1928. When the wine monopoly came in 1922, Holmen continued to produce raw spirits while the Vinmonopolet processed them further. In 1963 production of mashed potato moved to Mjøsstranda, and spirit production and other activity followed in 1967. Norske Potetindustrier took over the firm in 1982. The old premises stood empty for many years, but in the 1990s a new Gjøvik Glassverk began operating there, and the site later housed the Vitensenteret Innlandet science center, opened at Holmen in 2007, and the administration of the Mjøsmuseet.

=== Brumunddal Potetmel- og Sagofabrikk ===
Brumunddal was a small settlement that saw industrial growth after the railway reached the village in 1894. Helmer Huseby was an entrepreneur who first started a dairy in 1898, had a railway siding built, and sent milk to Oslo; he also took the initiative to build Brumunddal Potetmelfabrikk, completed in 1907. The starch factory was incorporated into Norske Potetindustrier in 1994 and was one of the cooperative's four factory plants.

=== Sundnes Brenneri ===
Sundnes Brenneri at Inderøy is one of the oldest spirit-production plants in Trøndelag. It was started in 1844 under the Sundnes farm, and in 1912 the distillery was bought by a consortium of local farmers. During the prohibition period in 1922, spirit production was replaced by potato-starch production, and the production of raw spirits for further processing at the Vinmonopolet was later resumed, along with other industrial processing of potatoes. The plant was kept as one of the production plants in the nationwide Norske Potetindustrier when it was established through mergers in 1994.

=== Hoff Norske Potetindustrier at Jæren ===
Jæren, as a center of the country's potato production, is also a natural place for the industrial processing of potatoes. The starch factory at Klepp was established in 1898 by the Stavanger entrepreneur Svend Mauritzen as Jærens Andels Potetmelfabrik at Klepp station, which had become a hub in the modern communication between Stavanger and Jæren with the railway's opening in 1878. In 1915 the starch factory was sold to the farmers who supplied the raw material and organized as a cooperative.

Potato starch was the main product at Klepp until the peak year of 1978, when 2,900 tonnes were produced from local raw materials. After 1980 the packing of table potatoes also began, and after 1990 washing, peeling, and blanching as well. When Hoff Norske Potetindustrier was established as a nationwide cooperative in 1994, the Klepp factory was included and kept as a production plant. The Klepp plant was nonetheless threatened with closure in 2004 when Hoff struggled with profitability, as its small operation of 30 employees, focused on washing and heat-treating potatoes for further processing in industry and large-scale kitchens, could easily be moved to Gjøvik. The tradition-rich factory at Jæren held its ground as one of four Hoff production plants, however, with potato starch and ready-prepared potatoes as its main products.
